= Hilda Spong =

English actress (1875–1955)

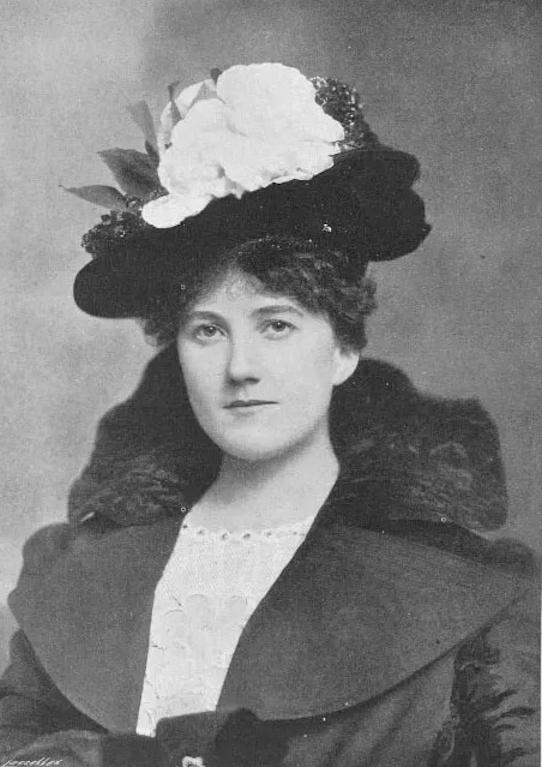
- Hilda Spong 1901
- Born: Frances Hilda Spong; 14 May 1875; London, England
- Died: 16 May 1955 (aged 80); Ridgefield, Connecticut, U.S.
- Other name: Frances H. Spong
- Occupations: Stage, film actress
- Years active: 1889-1944

Signature
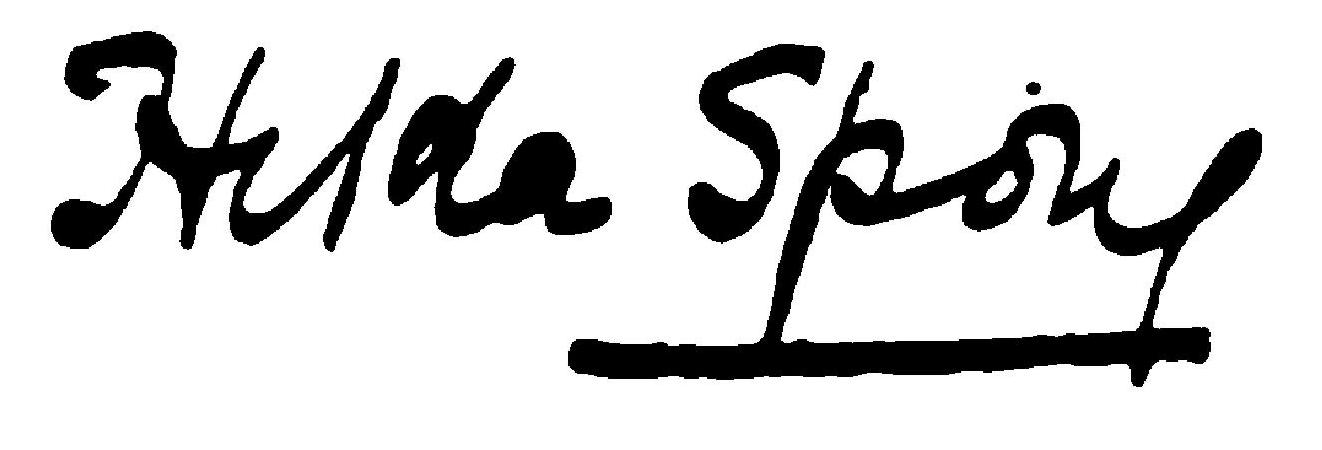

Hilda Spong (14 May 1875 – 16 May 1955), was an English-born actress of stage and screen, whose half-century long career was almost entirely in Australia and North America.

== Early life ==
Frances Hilda Spong was born on 14 May 1875, in St. Pancras, London to Walter Spong, a scene painter, and his wife Elizabeth Tweddell. Her father was born in London, and her mother in Northumberland; she was the second of their five children, and the only girl. During 1886, her father received a job offer from Robert Brough to be the chief scene painter for his theatre company, so the family moved to Melbourne, Australia.

== Australian and New Zealand stage ==
=== Early career ===
Spong first went on the stage at age fourteen, with the Brough-Boucicault Comedy Company for which her father worked. She appeared in Joseph's Sweetheart, produced by Robert Brough and Dion Boucicault Jr. at the Criterion Theatre in Sydney during July 1889. Adapted by Robert Buchanen from Henry Fielding's Joseph Andrews, the production with Spong in tow returned in June 1890 to the company's home venue, the Bijou Theatre in Melbourne.

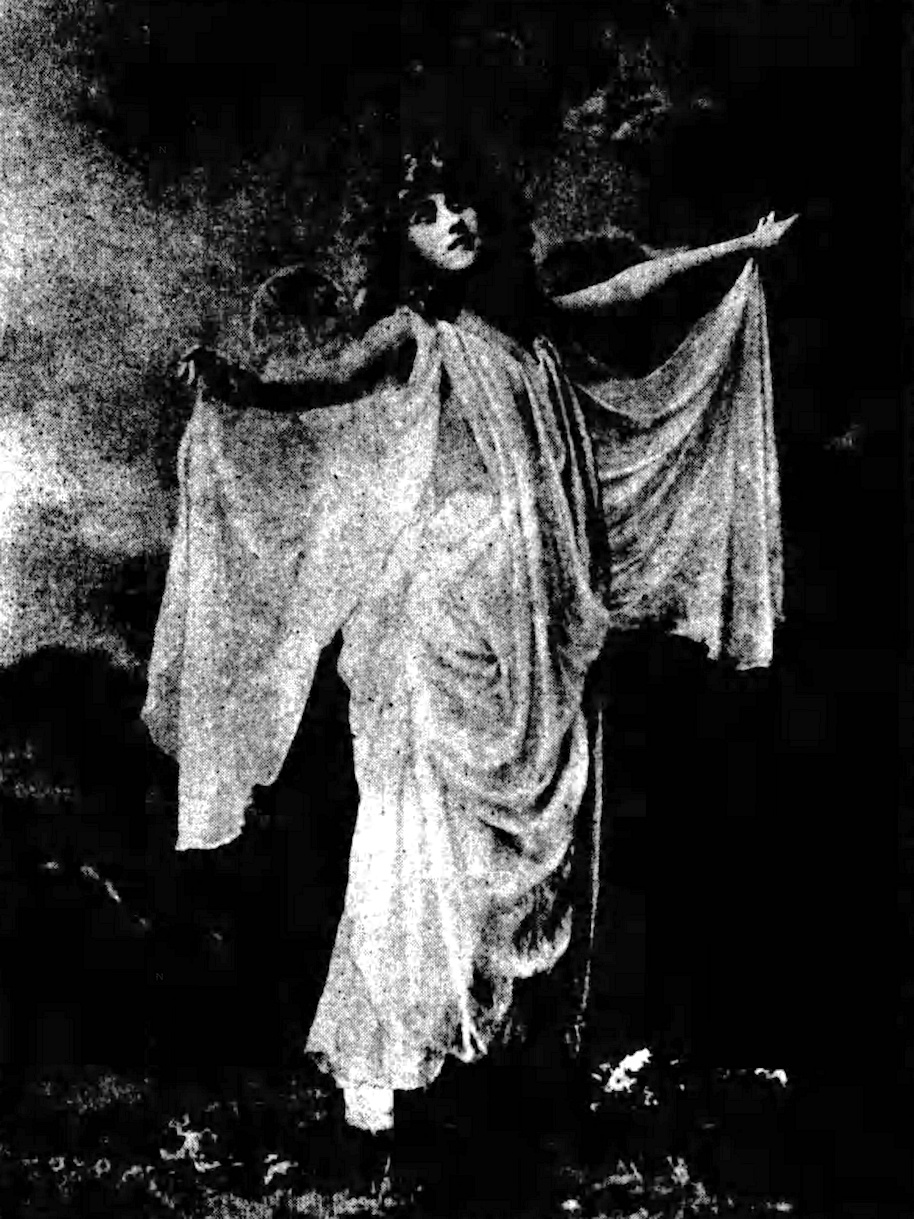
As Titania

By September 1890, Spong was performing in her second and third plays, The Parvenu and School. For a revival of Sophia in July 1891, she received her first accolade: "...Miss Hilda Spong, who is the prettiest, the most graceful, and the most promising of debutantes. She has everything to learn, but nothing to unlearn, and she made poor Molly quite a hit." Spong, now 16, took over a role in Led Astray when the regular actress was absent in December 1891. Later that same month, she had her first Shakespearean role, as Ursula in Much Ado About Nothing.

Spong had her first large dramatic part in May 1892, at the Princess Theatre production of Jo, adapted by J. P. Burnett from Charles Dickens Bleak House. Spong played Esther, the book's heroine but a featured role in this play, which starred Burnett's wife Jennie Lee as the title character. In June she moved with her mother to the South Yarra neighborhood of Melbourne, and a month later signed with George Rignold's troupe. She was cast as Titania in A Midsummer Night's Dream, wearing tights designed by her father. This was followed by a part in the Australian premiere of Ludwig Fulda's The Lost Paradise during September 1892.

=== Leading player ===
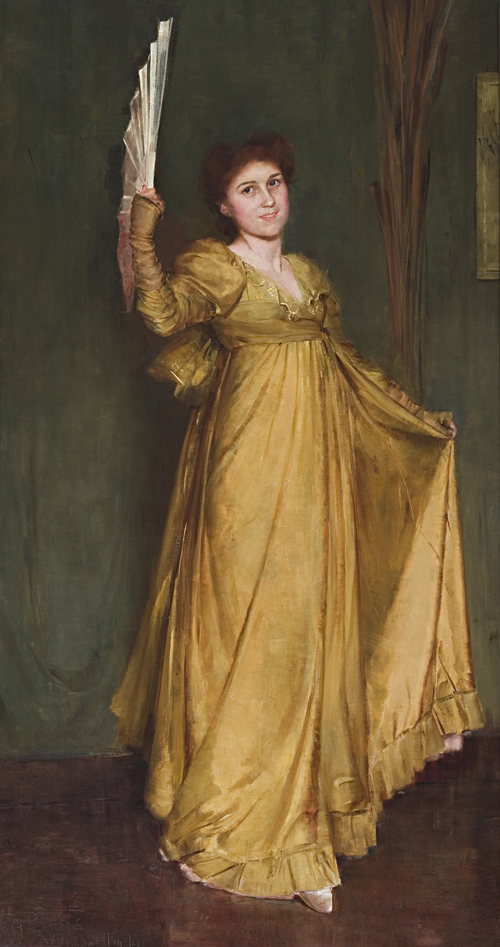
1893

The English Rose at Her Majesty's Theatre, Sydney, in November 1892, saw Spong playing the title role. The Sydney Morning Herald reviewer said she played the love scenes well but lacked a strong stage presence in the more dramatic moments. However, they were impressed with her improvement as the female lead in London Day by Day during late January 1893. Spong, called "a rising young star", received a new lead contract from George Rignold in February 1893. She was next cast in East Lynne, followed by It Is Never Too Late to Mend, both during May 1893.

Starting in July 1893, Spong was engaged by J. C. Williamson and George Musgrove to play "juveniles" for Edward O'Connor Terry's season in Australia. The first play up was Sweet Lavender, where Spong "proved an engaging and ingenuous Lavender, and acted with simplicity and tender directness". Artist Tom Roberts did a life-sized oil painting of Spong that was exhibited by the Art Society of New South Wales in August 1893. By October 1893, Spong had returned to George Rignold's company in Sydney with In the Ranks.

=== New Zealand tour ===
Spong continued performing with Rignold's Sydney company until January 1894, when her father and actor-manager Walter Howe formed a company for a tour of New Zealand. Her father went as scenic designer for the Howe and Spong Dramatic Company, while Hilda Spong was the leading lady. Their first production was Harbour Lights, at the Princess's Theatre in Dunedin, on 17 February 1894. The local reviewer said Spong "proved herself to be a capable and intelligent actress". Spong was accorded special billing in advertisements; her name was the only one in all caps for cast lists. The culmination of her Dunedin stay was a one-night performance as Rosalind for As You Like It, performed under the sponsorship of the Dunedin Shakespeare Society and University of Otago.

Following Dunedin, the tour went to Oamaru for two days, then played Timaru, and Christchurch. The tour left for the North Island, opening in Wellington on 2 April 1894. Throughout its New Zealand tour, the Howe-Spong company played the same seven works it had presented in Dunedin. After three weeks, the tour continued to Wanganui, Napier, and Auckland.

=== Return to Australia ===
The Howe-Spong Company carried its same repertoire to Newcastle, New South Wales upon its return to Australia in late May 1894. However, Spong and her father then moved to Sydney, where W. B. Spong leased the shuttered Criterion Theatre for the season. Hilda Spong headlined the opening as Rosalind in As You Like It, on 23 June 1894. This was a more complete version than that performed on tour, with new scenery by Spong's father and original incidental music by Consterdine. A local reviewer pronounced it "a triumphant success" for Hilda Spong. This was followed by productions of An Unequal Match by Tom Taylor, Pygmalion and Galatea and Pinero's The Money Spinner.

Spong joined the Bland Holt Company for her first tour to Queensland, starting with Brisbane. She performed there as an unscrupulous adventuress in A Million of Money beginning 6 October 1894, followed by a woman wronged in Henry Pettitt's A Woman's Revenge. Spong had just finished the Brisbane engagement with Round the Ring, when a four-wheeled cart she was riding in overturned on an banked road in Bowen Hills, Queensland, injuring her ankle and delaying her return to Sydney. When the Bland Holt Company visited Newcastle, a local paper said: "Miss Spong is not yet 20 years of age, but is tall and of an imposing appearance. She has a handsome, classical face, and a rich sympathetic voice...", and added "Naturally she is anxious to try her fortune in London".

== UK stage ==
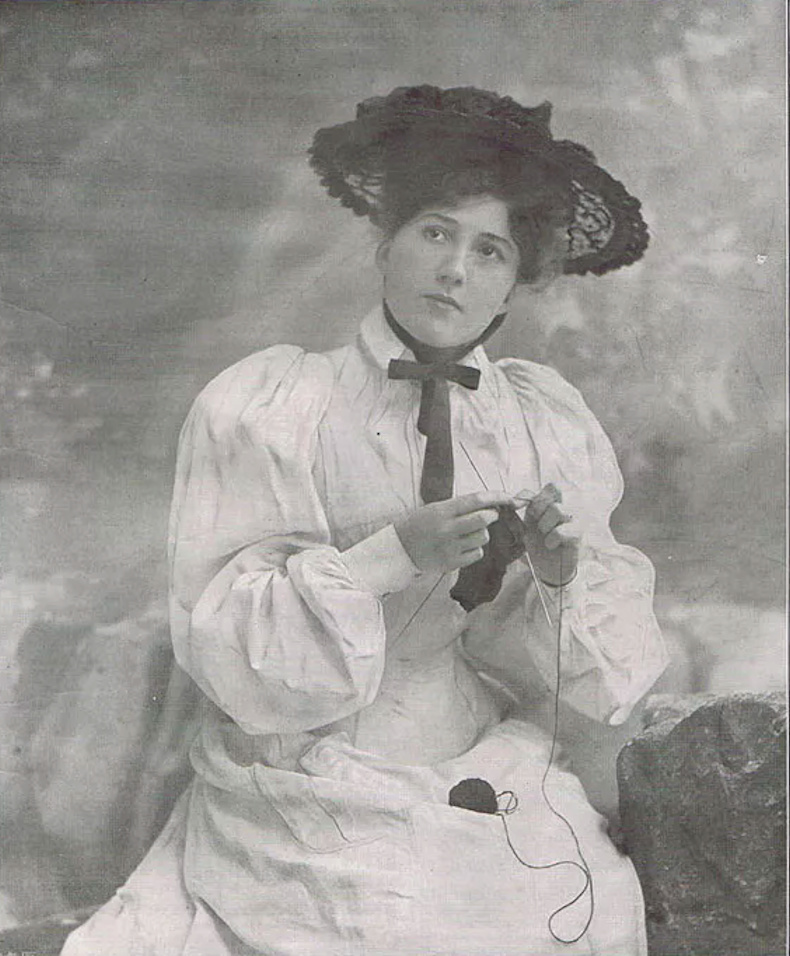

Spong travelled with her mother to England in August 1896 for a part in The Duchess of Coolgardie. This melodrama was produced by John Coleman, who The Times implied may also have written it. It ran for two months, after which Spong went into a short-lived flop called The Kiss of Delilah, where the reviewer pronounced her performance "curiously uneven". She then replaced another actress in an ongoing production of Two Little Vagabonds to a much better review. This production ran through the end of May 1897, after which The Era reported she had rented a houseboat on the Thames for a vacation.

By September 1897, The People remarked that she had not been on stage since Two Little Vagabonds ended. Later that month she signed with Arthur Chudleigh and Dion Boucicault for a series of comedies to be played at the Royal Court Theatre. The first was a modern German fairy-tale called The Children of the King, which had incidental music by Engelbert Humperdinck. The Standard said the music "is interwoven with the text" in a unique way, and Spong "acquitted herself of a trying part with distinction". Her next performance would be a breakthrough role for her, as Imogen Parrott in Trelawny of the 'Wells'. This A. W. Pinero play was a pointed satire of the English stage scene of the 1860s, the decline of stock companies. It was as celebrated for its costumes as its characters. Among the performers was a first-time actor, billed as James Erskine, who was the notorious Earl of Rosslyn.

== North American stage ==
=== The Frohman brothers ===
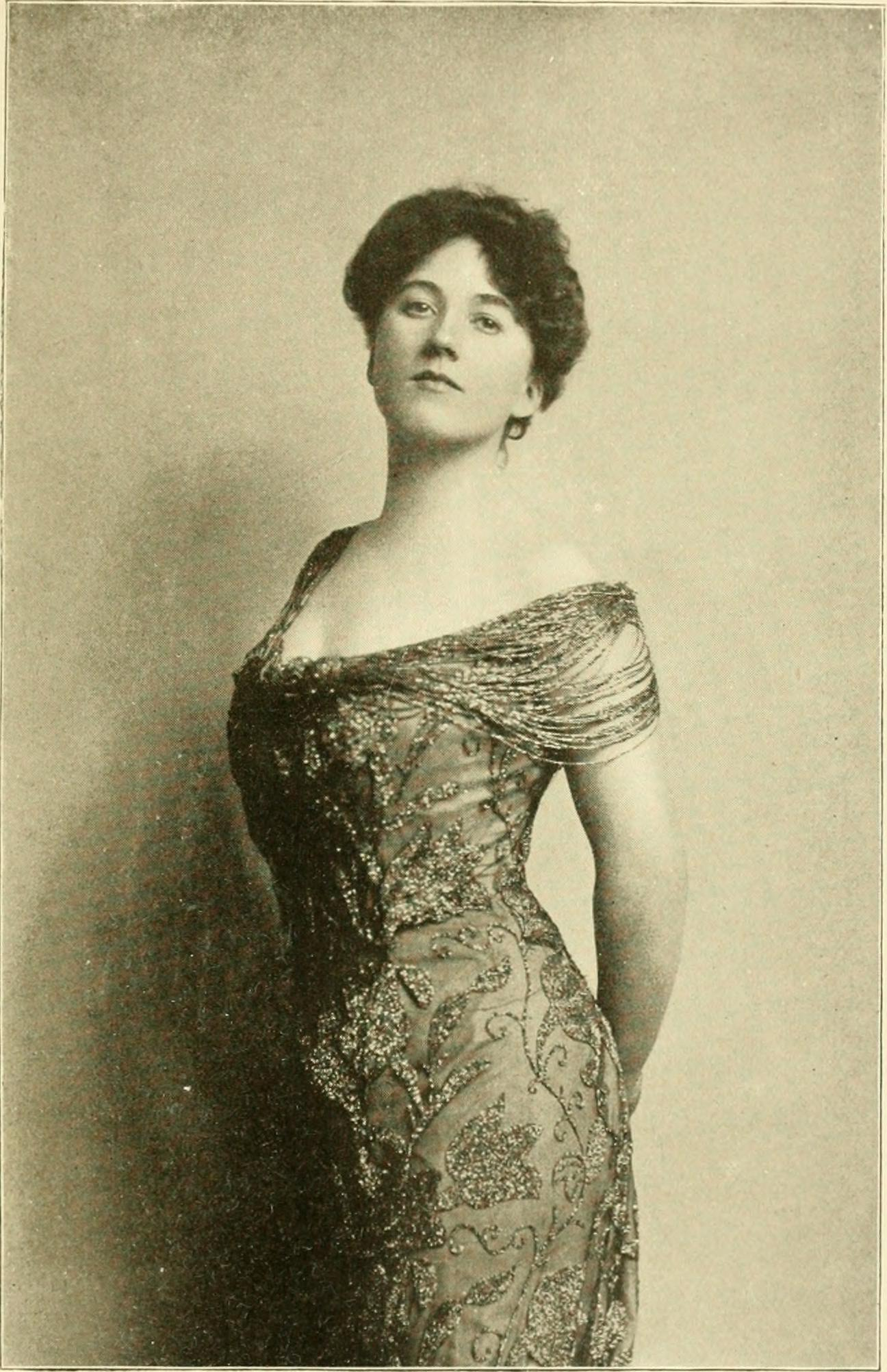
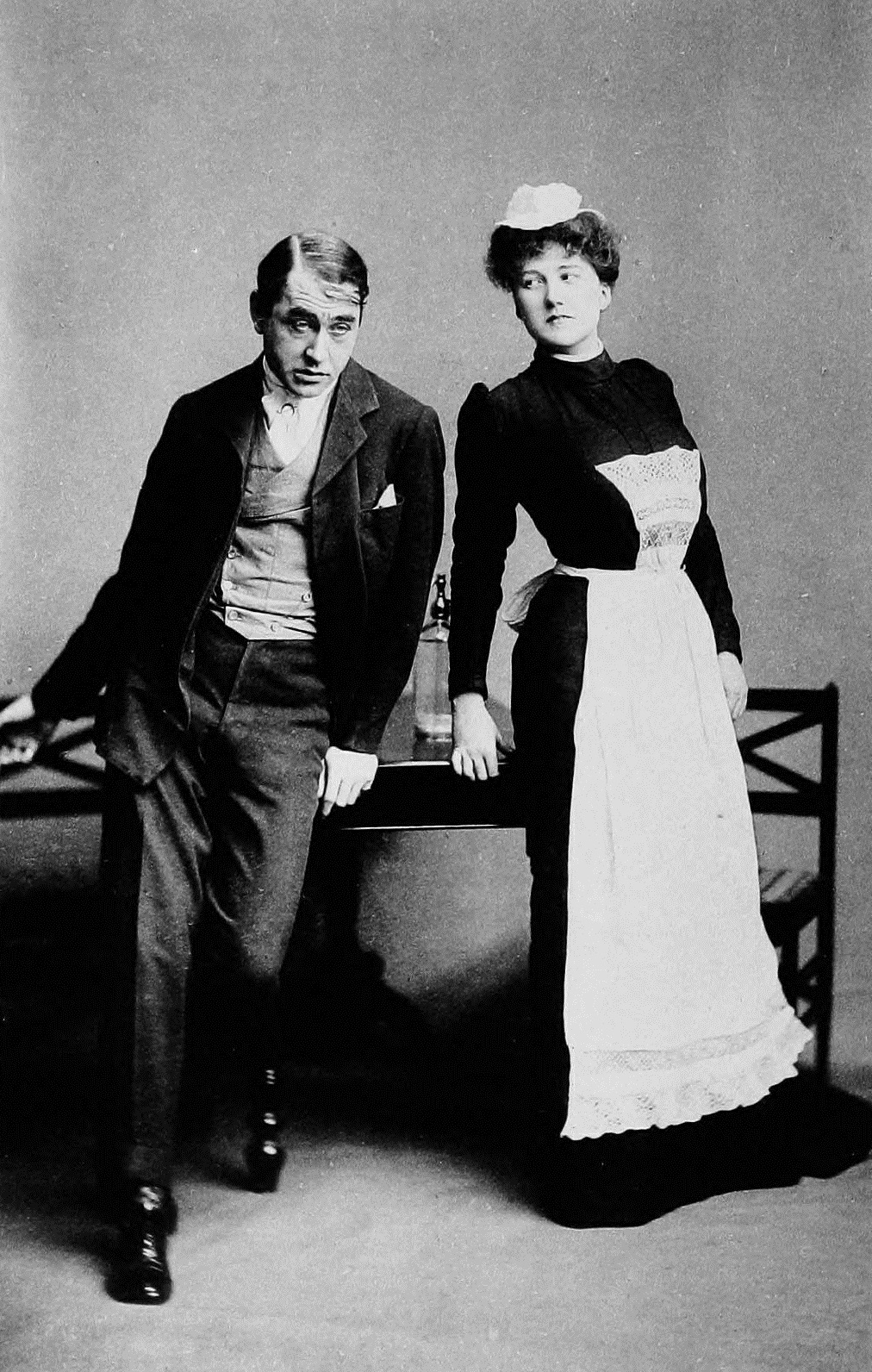

The Frohman brothers made annual trips to Europe, picking up the North American rights to plays, and looking for talent to perform them. During one such trip to England in September 1898, Daniel Frohman acquired rights to Trelawny of the 'Wells', then decided to recruit Hilda Spong to reprise her role. He asked her parents, who were managing her career, how much money it would take to bring her to America. Not wishing to leave England again so soon, they named an impossible figure, but were astonished when Frohman agreed. He signed Spong to a managerial contract and brought her to America in November 1898.

The American premiere of Trelawny of the 'Wells' starred another English actress, Mary Mannering, in the title role, but Spong drew the audience's attention with her outlandish retro fashions and charming mannerisms. The play carried no satirical overtones in America, where the audience was oblivious to the disguised references to real plays and actors. Spong now joined Mannering as the leading women for Daniel Frohman's Comedy Company, which specialized in playing adaptations of English and French comedies. (Note: The preference for European over American works was not unique to this company. The American Dramatists' Club grew so frustated with this bias that it suggested the US Congress should impose a 10% tax on gross receipts of foreign plays produced in the United States.) Given the repertoire involved, having English-born actresses to play leads was an advantage to the company. Their home venue was at first the old Lyceum Theatre, and later Daly's Theatre.

The first sequin dress worn on the stage was designed by Mrs. Robert Osborne for Hilda Spong's character in Wheels Within Wheels during December 1899. The gown was so unprecedented, one reviewer could only describe it as "steel embroidery". Spong would stay with Daniel Frohman after Mannering left, during which perhaps her most successful play was the American adaptation of Lady Huntworth's Experiment. This comedy by R. C. Carton had Spong play an aristocratic divorcee, who decides to secretly resume her maiden name to become a chef in a vicarage.

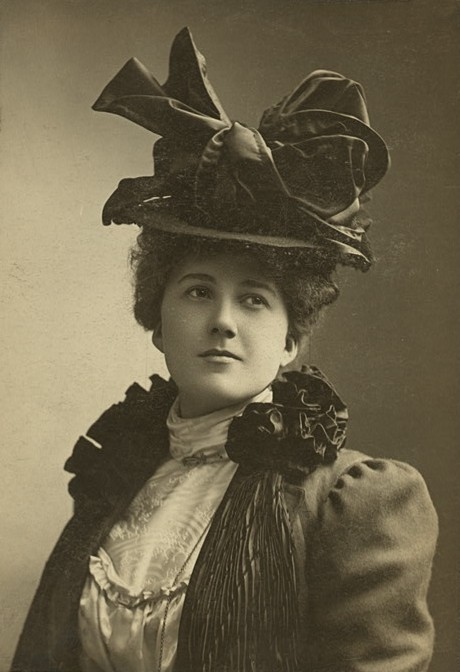

In June 1902 newspapers reported Charles Frohman had engaged Spong to support Virginia Harned in Iris for the Fall, and shortly after that it was definite she was not returning to Daniel Frohman's Comedy Company. Bertha Galland replaced her as Esmeralda in the road company of Notre Dame. The reason for this switch in managers, according to one drama critic, was the delay in building the new Lyceum Theatre, leaving Daniel Frohman's company without a Broadway venue. The new Pinero play Iris had its American premiere on Broadway during September 1902, with Spong in an inconsequential role.

Her next two plays under Charles Frohman were leading parts but in weak efforts: the melodrama Imprudence where she played an adulteress, and the ill-fated Miss Elizabeth's Prisoner. (Note: The reviewer said the play was "incompetant, inconsequential, and puerile rubbish" and the lead characters "inspired contempt". They accused Hilda Spong of overacting, remarked "Of the supporting company the less said the better", and sneered at star William Faversham, saying "the role was within his abilities".) Not until the revival Lord and Lady Algy and Joseph Entangled in 1904 did she start getting good roles from Charles Frohman. Other strong parts under his management were The Firm of Cunningham in 1905, where a critic said "Miss Spong plays with familiar ease, dash, and spirit" in this Willis Steell play, and The American Lord in 1906, a four-act comedy by Charles Dazey and George Broadhurst which had Spong as an Irish widow.

=== Independent player ===
During May 1906, Spong switched management again, to independent actor-manager Walter N. Lawrence. Although a leading player with the Frohmans, she was not a star. Now it was reported that she would become one with Lawrence. Unfortunately, the vehicle Spong and Lawrence jointly chose for her first star turn was Lady Jim, a flawed work by neophyte playwright Harold R. Heaton. It lasted three weeks, then was withdrawn in favor of John Hudson's Wife. It also ran its course by the end of November 1906, when Spong was said to have ended her season.

Spong was then idle until April 1907, when she joined the Columbia Stock Company in Washington, D.C., and sued her former manager Lawrence for $4000 back pay. A newspaper report gave her weekly salary as $200 under Lawrence, and said she sought to recover pay for 20 weeks idle time. Her first performance with the Columbia Stock Company was a revival of her 1905 hit The Firm of Cunningham. This was followed by other one-week revivals, finishing up in July 1907.

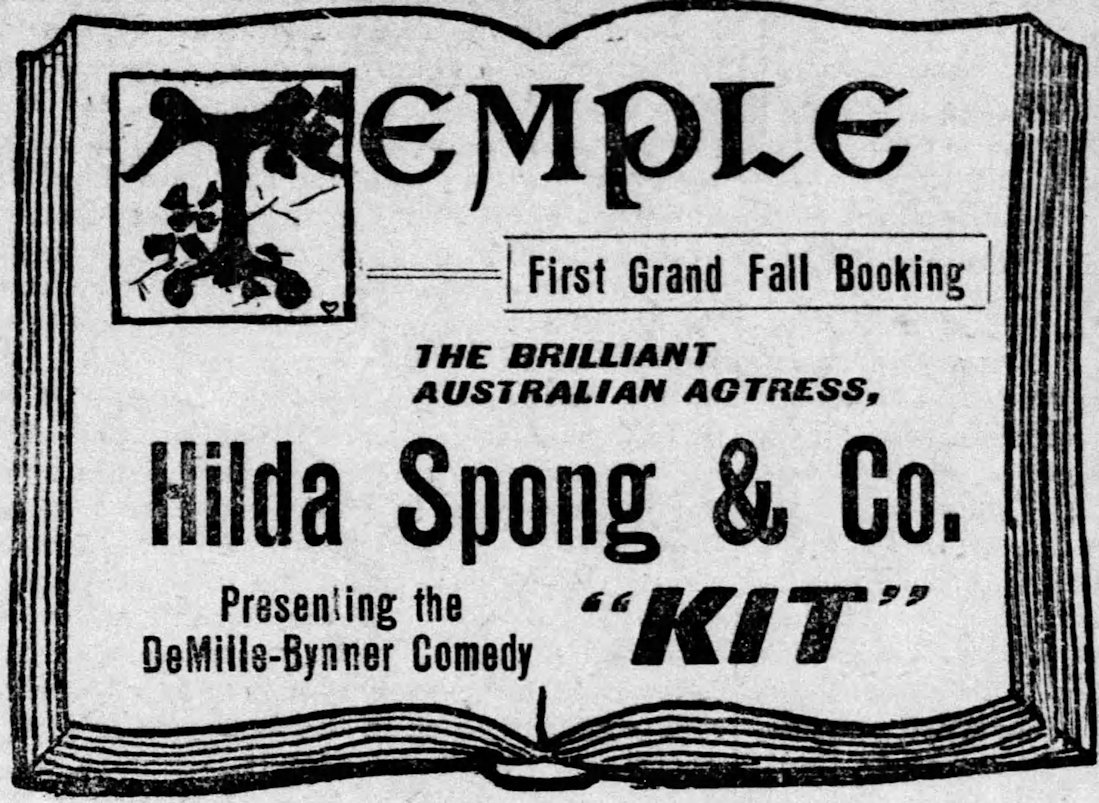

That same month she agreed to a forty-week tour at the United Booking Office for performing in vaudeville, with a one-act play called Kit, written for her by Cecil B. DeMille. This was a western melodrama, in which Spong played Kit, a breezy big-hearted woman involved with a sheriff (Arthur Behrens) and a disguised thief (Walter Howe) who is actually her father, a justice of the peace. Her tour opened at Detroit's Temple Theatre on 2 September 1907. The tour ran thru February 1908.

She is next heard of in November 1908, rehearsing at the Lyceum Theatre in Manhattan for A Man and His Mate. The play opened in South Norwalk, Connecticut on 23 November 1908. Spong portrayed a doctor in this controversial play (Note: The play, set in a small New Mexico mining town, featured a self-sacrificing college-educated Chinese man, who displayed virtues not evident in the play's white male characters. This went well in the Eastern US, but not in the Midwest.) she co-wrote with H. R. Durant. Spong was upset at the reception the play received in Minnesota and other locales, particularly one scene when her character first meets "the man" and they are instantly bonded in love. Audiences snickered, provoking Spong's public ire.

=== Overseas interlude ===
The disappointment with A Man and His Mate and a certain amount of nostalgia, led Spong to accept an offer from J. C. Williamson to go on tour to Australia during 1911–1912. She starred in Everywoman, which had premiered on Broadway during February 1911 with Laura Nelson Hall. The tour was very successful, and later included William Desmond supporting Spong, in plays such as Alias Jimmy Valentine, Passers-By, and Camille. Spong also found time to play a small role in the Australian premiere of The Woman during September 1912. After one year in Australia, Spong went to England in December 1912 on board the RMS Orama.

The Daily Telegraph listed her London mailing address with the notation "Disengaged" during March 1913. It was in September 1913 that Spong reappeared on a London stage after a fifteen-year absence, in the first performance of George R. Sims' melodrama, The Ever Open Door. Spong starred in this "kind of Oliver Twist" play, as Lady Dereham who becomes Sister Miriam at a foundling's home in London. A success, it was still going so strong after three months that an extra matinee was added.

=== Broadway 1915-1930 ===
Spong returned to the United States in late April 1915, sailing on the RMS Lusitania on its last full journey. The ship's sinking on its return voyage affected her personally, for the purser was a friend she had known since childhood, while Charles Frohman was a longtime colleague. She had not planned to work on this trip to America, but was persuaded to take on the lead in a revival of Candida when Dorothy Donnelly dropped out of the production just before the opening.

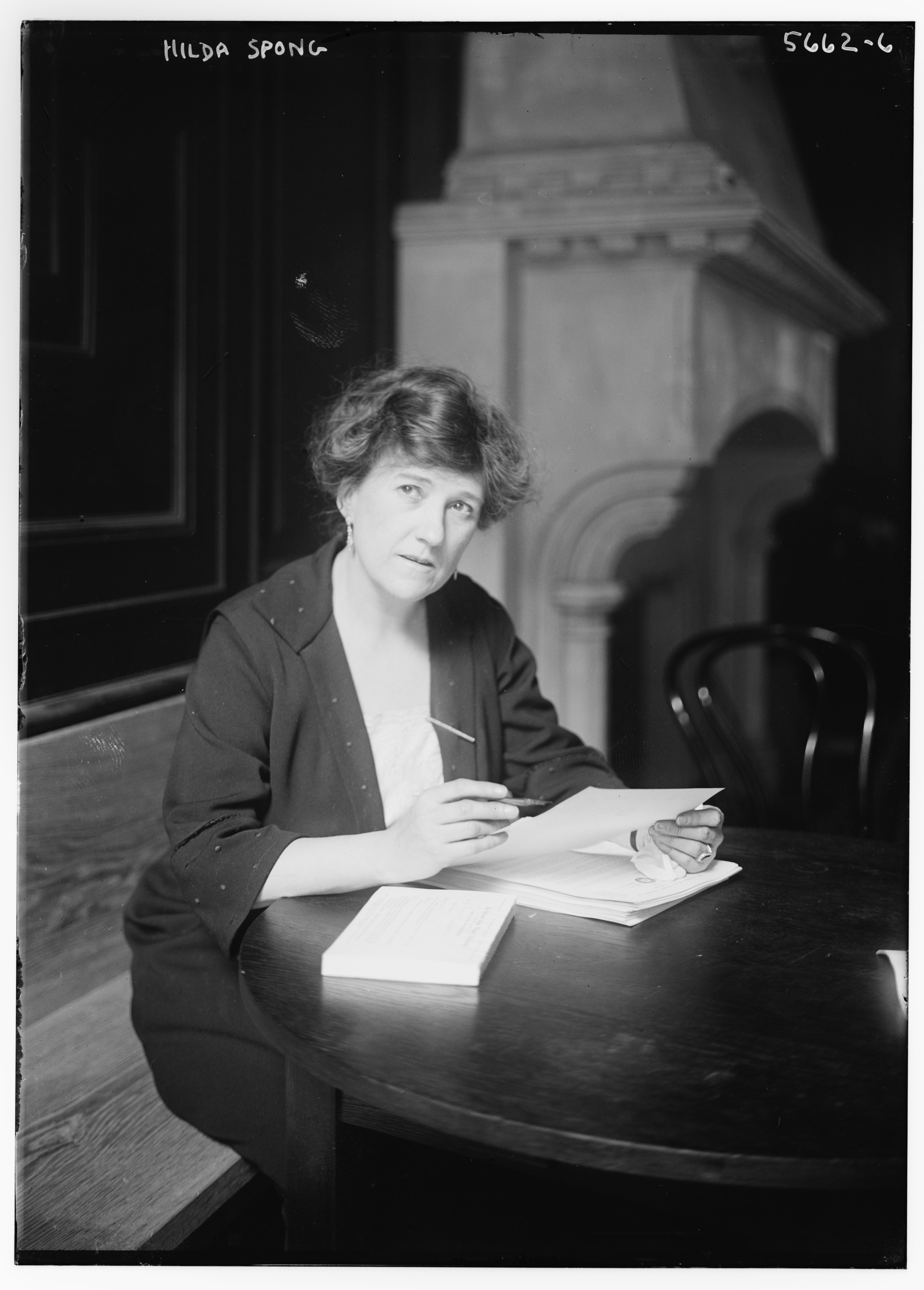

Her next Broadway role was another unfortunate work, The Angel in the House, which a reviewer termed "Incoherent", "pathetic", "boring" and said some "first nighters" left before the end. Spong was an Irish widow and 17-year-old Eva Le Gallienne a Cockney servant during 1847 for Bunny, which had a much better reception. For Caesar's Wife in 1919, the reviewer noted Spong was "restored to an earlier slimness". She really came into her prime as a comedy character during 1922, with her "flirtatious Countess" in Fédora, while for Manhattan, according to Lawrence Reamer, "her skill adds distinction to any part in which she appears".

The pinnacle of her later career came with playing Princess Beatrice in The Swan, a comedy by Ferenc Molnár which starred Eva Le Gallienne and Basil Rathbone. It was a major success on Broadway during 1923–1924, with Spong as a pushy noble mother trying to foist her unethusiastic daughter off on a seemingly oblivious crown prince. She had another personal success with The Right Age to Marry, where a critic said Spong "steals the show" as a "designing woman of uncertain years". After some forgettable flops, Burns Mantle said "Hilda Spong does nicely playing a disagreeable dowager" in The High Road. A popular if mildly sensational 1929-1930 hit was Young Sinners, where Burns Mantle said Spong's part was "authoritatively played" in this work reminiscent of Strictly Dishonorable.

=== Last performances ===
Spong maintained her position as a principal actress in her last years on the stage. After a miserable 1934, where she appeared in two successive flops, her final performances were in successful productions. She played "a ribald doctor" in One Good Year, but withdrew from that long-running production in early January 1936, after seven weeks. For The Lady Has a Heart in 1937, she played a countess, while for her final Broadway production she played a speaking role in the musical Higher and Higher. In September 1944, she was in the episode "Her Master's Voice", on the Arthur Hopkins Presents radio program, broadcast over WEAF-FM.

=== Drama school ===
The Hilda Spong Theatre School (Note: From 1937 on it was listed in newspapers as the Hilda Spong School of the Theatre.) was located at 9 East 59th Street in Manhattan during October 1936. The earliest public mention of it comes from November 1935. Spong was director of the school, which was associated with the Little Theatre Movement. She spoke on the subject, alongside Daniel Frohman and Rollo Peters, at an annual dinner for the Westchester Drama Association. An advertisement for the school from December 1936 listed classes in fencing (led by Giorgio Santelli), dancing, singing, and diction, the last of which Spong taught. Among the performers known to have attended her dramatic school were Malcolm Atterbury and Gary Merrill.

== Personal life and character ==
In her Declaration of Intention for naturalization as a US citizen, Spong gave her birth date and birthplace, said she was a British national, had no spouse and no children, and had emigrated to the US in November 1898. At age 57, she gave her physical description as brown hair, hazel eyes, height 5 ft 7 in (170 cm) and weight 150 pounds (68 kg).

“Domesticity!– oh, that's all very well, and I simply adore children, but deliver me from a husband, for a good while to come. Of course, a man is tremendously useful, sometimes: in fact, you cawn't (Note: An attempt by the interviewer to reproduce Spong's "English" accent.) get along without one to manage your affairs for you, so someday I suppose–– but, oh heaven's! I've got to go on, and there I go shivering like a leaf again. Please do not roast me in the paper, will you– that's a dear.” —From a 1907 Hilda Spong backstage interview

Spong was exceptionally close to her parents, who lived with her until their deaths. Her mother travelled on tours with her, even to Australia in 1911. Spong had a small poultry farm on her rural Long Island property. She named the chickens after her famous contemporaries in the theatrical world. When her father once asked what was for dinner, Spong replied "Maude Adams". While on tour in Sydney during March 1912, a masked man put a ladder up to her boarding room window at 2 am and started to climb it. Spong was awake, and heard the noise. She always slept with a small revolver under her pillow, having been taught to shoot by her father and older brother. Spong fired two shots at him from the open window, causing the intruder to jump off the ladder. She fired three more shots as he ran for the front gate of the yard. Plain clothes detectives in the area, due to a rash of burglaries committed by a masked man, pursued but were unable to catch him. While in Adelaide, Spong gave an interview in 1912 which expressed her reservations about female suffrage and prohibition, both of which she had seen on tour in New Zealand.

Her younger brother Charles H. Spong, who had followed their father into scenic design, also emigrated to the United States. He worked in theatres in Philadelphia, and named his daughter Hilda. Her other three brothers had remained in Australia; she met with them on her 1911-1912 tour.

Actress Minnie Dupree left a legacy to Spong in her will when she died in 1947. Dupree, who had declared bankruptcy in 1933, left her entire estate to friends who had stood by her in adversity. Spong, who was already living in Ridgefield, Connecticut, was the only stage figure mentioned.

== Death and legacy ==
Hilda Spong died two days after her 80th birthday, on 16 May 1955, at Ridgefield, Connecticut, where she had lived many years. The New York Times said in her obituary: "Because she was professional in her attitude toward acting, she continued to study singing and rarely spent a day without reading Shakespeare. As Miss Spong grew older, she turned to the parts of older women without the fuss often shown by actresses at this stage of their careers". Her obituaries had several errors. Some said she was born in Melbourne, others that she was on the stage for 65 years, ignoring her absence from acting since 1944. Many cited her last stage performance as The Lady Has a Heart in 1937, rather than Higher and Higher in 1940.

== Stage credits ==
=== Australia and New Zealand ===
Australian and New Zealand stage performances by year of Spong's first involvement.
Year	Play	Role	Venue	Notes/Sources
1889	Joseph's Sweetheart	Masquerade Lady	Criterion Theatre; Bijou Theatre	Spong's stage debut came in Sydney, Australia just two months after her 14th birthday.
1890	The Parvenu		Bijou Theatre	
1890	School	Kitty	Bijou Theatre	Four-act comedy by T. W. Robertson.
1891	Sophia	Molly Seagum	Bijou Theatre	
1891	Devotion	Genevieve	Criterion Theatre	An 1884 costume drama by Dion Boucicault Jr. was not well received.
1891	Led Astray	Mathilde	Bijou Theatre	
1891	Much Ado About Nothing	Ursula	Bijou Theatre	
1892	Trial by Jury	Third Bridesmaid	Bijou Theatre	Her first Gilbert and Sullivan comic opera role was a chorus bit.
1892	The Hobby Horse	Bertha	Bijou Theatre	Spong had an ingenue role in this Pinero comedy.
1892	Jo	Esther Summerson	Princess Theatre	This three-act melodrama was Spong's first time away from the Brough company.
1892	A Midsummer Night's Dream	Titania	Princess Theatre	
1892	The Lost Paradise	Nell	Princess Theatre	Spong had a small part as a factory girl fired after being crippled in a workplace accident.
1892	The English Rose	Ethel Kingston	Her Majesty's Theatre	Spong had the title role in this four-act drama by George Sims and Robert Buchanan.
1893	London Day by Day	Violet Chester	Her Majesty's Theatre	Four-act melodrama by George Sims and Henry Pettitt.
1893	East Lynne	Barbara Hare	Her Majesty's Theatre	
1893	It Is Never Too Late to Mend	Susan Merton	Her Majesty's Theatre	Stage adaptation of Charles Reade's 1856 novel.
1893	Sweet Lavender	Lavender Rolt	Lyceum Theatre	This marked the start of Spong with Williamson and Musgrove.
1893	In Chancery	Mrs. Joliffe	Princess Theatre	Farce of amnesia and mistaken identity by A. W. Pinero.
1893	Liberty Hall	Amy Chilworth	Princess Theatre	.
1893	The Rocket	Florence	Princess Theatre	Weak farce by A. W. Pinero.
1893	In the Ranks	Ruth Herrick	Her Majesty's Theatre	Military-themed drama by Henry Pettitt and George R. Sims.
1893	The Mystery of a Hansom Cab	Madge Frettleby	Her Majesty's Theatre	Dramatic adaptation of Fergus Hume's novel.
1893	The Romany Rye	Gertie Hackett	Her Majesty's Theatre	
1893	Man to Man	Ethel Maythorne	Her Majesty's Theatre	Drama by William Bourne about an escaped prisoner.
1894	Harbour Lights	Dora Vane	Princess's Theatre (Note: This was in Dunedin.)	First on her New Zealand tour was five-act nautical melodrama by George R. Sims.
1894	The Grip of Iron	Marie Guerin	Princess's Theatre	Arthur Shirley's adaptation of Les Étrangleurs de Paris by Adolphe Belot.
1894	Romeo and Juliet	Juliet	Princess's Theatre	Spong and A. E. Greenaway in the balcony scene only, before Stolen Kisses.
1894	Stolen Kisses	Cherry Spirit	Princess's Theatre	An 1876 three-act comedy-drama by Paul Meritt.
1894	As You Like It	Rosalind	Princess's Theatre	
1894	Hazel	Hazel Kirke	Princess's Theatre	New adaptation by Johnson Cleveland of American play Hazel Kirke.
1894	True as Steel	May Inglesant; Lillian Lesant (Note: This drama has a prologue with a different set of characters from the main body of the play, which takes place 15 years later. Spong and some others in the small company "doubled up" parts.)	Princess's Theatre	Anti-labor drama by Muskerry and Callender set in the north of England.
1894	As You Like It	Rosalind	Criterion Theatre	A new production of this play opened The Spong Company season.
1894	An Unequal Match	Hester Grazebrook	Criterion Theatre	
1894	Pygmalion and Galatea	Galatea	Criterion Theatre	
1894	The Money Spinner	Millicent Croodle	Criterion Theatre	Comedy by A. W. Pinero marked the end of the Spong Company season.
1894	A Million of Money	Stella St. Clair	Opera House (Note: This was with the Bland Holt Company in Brisbane.)	Comedy in four acts by Henry Pettitt and Augustus Harris.
1894	A Woman's Revenge	Mary Lonsdale	Opera House	Comedy by Henry Pettitt.
1894	The Prodigal Daughter	Rose Woodmere	Opera House	Comedy in five acts by Henry Pettitt and Augustus Harris.
1894	Round the Ring	Merey Thornton	Opera House	Circus comedy by Paul Merrit.
1911	Everywoman	Everywoman	Theatre Royal; Theatre Royal	Spong returned to Australia in this modern morality play by Walter Browne.
1912	Passers-by	Margaret Summers	Theatre Royal	Four-act drama by C. Haddon Chambers alternated with Everywoman on Spong's tour.
1912	Alias Jimmy Valentine	Rose Lane	Touring company	
1912	Camille	Marguerite Gautier	Touring company	
1912	The Woman	Grace	Theatre Royal (Sydney)	Political drama by William C. deMille, set in Washington, D.C.

=== United Kingdom ===
UK stage performances by year of Spong's first involvement.
Year	Play	Role	Venue	Notes/Sources
1896	The Duchess of Coolgardie	Sybil Grey	Drury Lane Theatre	Spong's UK stage debut at age 21 was a five-act melodrama set in Western Australia.
1896	The Kiss of Delilah	Herminie Vanhove	Drury Lane Theatre	Absurd melodrama on the Reign of Terror lasted 2 performances.
1896	Two Little Vagabonds	Marion Thornton	Princess's Theatre	Spong replaced another actress in this on-going production.
1897	The Children of the King	Innkeeper's Daughter	Royal Court Theatre	From Königskinder by Ernst Rosmer, adapted to English by John Davidson.
1898	Trelawny of the 'Wells'	Imogen Parrott	Royal Court Theatre	Spong was in the London premiere for this Arthur Pinero satire of 1860s theatre.
1913	The Ever Open Door	Miriam, Lady Dereham	Aldwych Theatre	Spong starred in George R. Sims play about the London slums.

=== North America ===
Selected US and Canadian stage performances by year of Spong's first involvement.
Year	Play	Role	Venue	Notes/Sources
1898	Trelawny of the 'Wells'	Imogen Parrott	Lyceum Theatre	Spong's Broadway and American debut was considered "clever acting".
1899	Americans at Home	Loraine Grandin	Lyceum Theatre	Spong is a society woman returning from Europe with a wealthy fiancé.
1899	Wheels Within Wheels	Mrs. Onslow Bulmer	Hoyt's Theatre	American premiere of R. C. Carton comedy has Spong as outrageously immoral.
1900	The Ambassador	Lady Beauvedere	Daly's Theatre	American premiere of comedy by John Oliver Hobbes has Spong a young widow.
1900	The Interrupted Honeymoon	Mrs. Daniel Gordon	Daly's Theatre	American premiere of comedy by Kinsey Peile has Spong as imprudent wife.
1900	The Man of Forty	Mrs. Egerton	Daly's Theatre	A wronged woman who thinks herself a widower is Spong's role.
1900	Lady Huntworth's Experiment	Caroline Rayward	Daly's Theatre	Spong is an aristocratic divorcee who goes under her maiden name as a cook in a vicarage.
1902	Frocks and Frills	Olive Devereux	Daly's Theatre	Spong stars as a poor girl who makes good as a milliner; adapted from Les Doigts de fée.
1902	Notre Dame	Esmeralda	Daly's Theatre	Five act melodrama by Paul M. Potter from Victor Hugo's 1831 novel.
1902	Iris	Fanny Sylvain	Criterion Theatre	Five-act tragedy by Arthur Wing Pinero, with only a small part for Spong.
1902	Imprudence	Lady Duncan	Empire Theatre	Three-act melodrama by Henry V. Esmond had Spong as an adultress.
1903	Miss Elizabeth's Prisoner	Elizabeth Philipse	Criterion Theatre	Comedy by E. Lyall Swete and Robert Neilson Stephens drew a blistering review.
1903	Lord and Lady Algy	Lady Algeron Chetland	Criterion Theatre	Revival by William Faversham of his 1899 American adaptation of an 1898 London hit.
1904	Joseph Entangled	Lady Verona Mayne	Garrick Theatre	The reviewer said Spong "was at her best" in this Henry Arthur Jones marital comedy.
1905	Sherlock Holmes	Madge Larrabee	Empire Theatre	Revival of William Gillette's trademark stage role.
1905	The Firm of Cunningham	Dora Calvert	Madison Square Theatre	
1906	The American Lord	Mrs. Westbrooke	Hudson Theatre	
1906	Lady Jim	Lady Jim	Weber's Theatre	Comedy by Harold R. Heaton produced by Walter N. Lawrence as a vehicle for Spong.
1906	John Hudson's Wife	Honor Beauchamp Hudson	Weber's Theatre	Spong had the title lead in play by Alicia Ramsey and Rudolph de Cordova.
1907	The Firm of Cunningham	Dora Calvert	Columbia Theatre	Revival of Willis Steell play.
1907	Diplomacy	Countess Zika	Columbia Theatre	Revival also starred Wilton Lackaye and Charlotte Walker.
1907	Featherbrain	Mrs. Samuel Coney	Columbia Theatre	Revival of French play Tête de Linotte adapted by James Alberry.
1907	Bruvver Jim's Baby	Miss Doc	Columbia Theatre	Debut melodrama by Philip Verrill Mighels based on his novel of same title.
1907	Trilby	Trilby O'Ferrall	Columbia Theatre	Reviewer felt Spong's Trilby was too worldly at first.
1907	Aristocracy	Mrs. Stockton	Columbia Theatre	Revival of 1892 Bronson Howard work.
1907	The Maneuvers of Jane	Jane Nangle	Columbia Theatre	Revival of four-act 1898 Henry Arthur Jones comedy.
1907	The Stubbornness of Geraldine	Geraldine Lang	Columbia Theatre	Revival of Clyde Fitch four-act comedy from 1902.
1907	Moths	Vera	Columbia Theatre	Revival of Henry Hamilton's 1882 adaptation of Ouida novel.
1907	The Amazons	Lady Noel	Columbia Theatre	Revival of A. W. Pinero 1893 comedy.
1907	Kit	Kit	Vaudeville circuit	Three-character one-act play written for Spong by Cecil B. DeMille and Walter Bynner.
1909	A Man and His Mate	Dr. Elizabeth Breckinridge	Touring company	This melodrama also featured Herbert Percy, Mortimer Snow, Loudon McCormick, and Fred A. Sullivan. (Note: The playwright Harold R. Durant was an eclectic writer, who was also an attorney and the owner of a minor league baseball team. This was his first play, and surprisingly, was made into a 1915 silent film of the same title.)
1909	A Bird and a Cold Bottle		Vaudeville circuit	One-act play starred Spong and Arthur Forrest.
1909	A Little Brother of the Rich	Muriel Evers	Touring company	Spong plays a "husband-snatcher" in this play by Joseph Medill Patterson.
1915	Candida	Candida	Park Theatre	Spong replaced Dorothy Donnelly, whose withdrawal delayed the revival's opening.
1915	The Angel in the House	Lady Sarrel	Fulton Theatre	
1916	Bunny	Kate Cavanaugh	Hudson Theatre	
1916	Getting Married	Lesbia Grantham	Booth Theatre	American premiere of Shaw's 1908 satire on marriage.
1917	The Love Drive	Mrs. Jepson	Criterion Theatre	Spong "gave dash" to an "unconvincing part".
1918	The Fountain of Youth	Mrs. Lupin	Henry Miller's Theater	
1918	The Good Men Do	Suzanna	Fulton Theatre	Double bill with Her Honor, the Mayor, produced by Actors' and Authors' Theatre, Inc.
1919	Caesar's Wife	Mrs. Pritchard	Liberty Theatre	
1921	The Fan	Giselle Vaudrey	Punch & Judy Theatre	Adapted by Pitts Duffield from L'éventail by Robert de Flers and G. A. De Caillavet.
1922	Fédora	Countess Olga Soukareva	Hudson Theatre	
1922	Manhattan	Mrs. Van Norman	Playhouse Theatre	
1923	The Humming Bird	Henriette Fish	Ritz Theatre	
1923	Pride	Duchess de Valmont	Morosco Theatre	Spong was the lead in this "parlor melodrama", a duchess by marriage.
1923	The Swan	Princess Beatrice	Cort Theatre	
1925	Harvest	Miss Knight	Belmont Theatre	"Hilda Spong plays a tiresome woman tiresomely".
1925	Lucky Sam McCarver	Princess Stra	Playhouse Theatre	
1926	The Right Age to Marry	Mrs. Carlisle	49th Street Theatre	
1926	What Never Dies	Dorothea	Lyceum Theatre	"A cumbersome, artificial and rather tiresome comedy", saved by Haidee Wright's performance.
1927	Caste	La Duchess De Bercy	Mansfield Theatre	Abie's Irish Rose set among high society, lasted little more than a week.
1928	Veils	Mother Superior	Forrest Theatre	"Twins in a convent" story lasted four performances.
1928	He Understood Women	Baroness LeLong	Belmont Theatre	"It was all so stupid and boring..." according to the reviewer.
1928	The High Road	Lady Trench	Fulton Theatre	
1929	Young Sinners	Mrs. Sinclair	Morosco Theatre	
1932	Only the Young	Squirrel	Sutton Show Shop (Note: An experimental theatre in the East 50's of Manhattan.)	Spong played a "broad-minded mother" in this Cecil Lewis flop.
1933	Evensong	Nurse Phillips	Selwyn Theatre	A small part for Spong in this play that didn't appeal to American audiences.
1933	Young Sinners	Mrs. Sinclair	Ambassador Theatre	Revival again starred Dorothy Appleby as Spong's stage daughter.
1933	Thoroughbred	Clarissa Van Horne	Vanderbilt Theatre	Mediocre comedy by Doty Hobart kept going only by efforts of star Florence Reed.
1934	These Two	Miss Butterworth	Henry Miller's Theatre	Judged "futile" and "pathetic", a drama by Lionel Hale showed the peril for critics who write plays.
1934	Birthday (Note: This play was also known by the alternate title Sixteen.)	Mrs. McNeil	49th Street Theatre	Critically panned drama by Aimée and Philip Stuart flopped after two weeks.
1935	One Good Year	Dr. Emelia Hansen	Lyceum Theatre; Fulton Theatre	Spong and Gertrude Flynn "give better performances than the play deserved".
1937	The Lady Has a Heart	The Countess Marjassy	Longacre Theatre	She starred with Vincent Price, Lumsden Hare, and Elissa Landi in this work by Ladislaus Bus-Fekete.
1940	Higher and Higher	Miss Whiffen	Shubert Theatre	Spong's last stage performance was a principal role in this musical.

== Filmography ==
- Divorced (1915) - A five-reel silent film from Equitable Motion Picture Corporation. Spong had the starring role.
- A Star Over Night (1919) - A two-reel short, made by the Stage Women's War Relief Fund, starred David Belasco, with Spong in a supporting role.
- Supper at Six (1933) - A Mentone musical short, starring Maude Odell, with Spong featured. (Note: The restored film is available on YouTube.)
