= Young Sinners =

Young Sinners may refer to:

- Young Sinners (play), a 1929 play by Elmer Harris
- Young Sinners (1931 film), an American drama film, based on the play
- Young Sinners (1958 film), a French-Italian film
