= The Greeks Had a Word for It =

1930 play by Zoe Akins

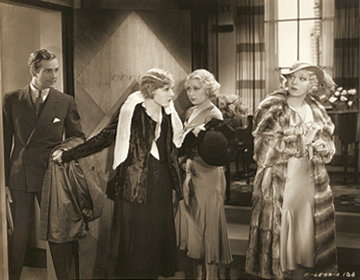
- Still from the film adaptation
- Original language: English
- Written by: Zoe Akins
- Subject: Episodes in the lives of three women
- Genre: Comedy

Premiere
- Date: September 25, 1930
- Place: Sam H. Harris Theatre
- Directed by: William Harris Jr.

The Greeks Had a Word for It (also known as The Greeks Had a Name for It) is a 1930 play written by Zoe Akins. It is a three-act comedy that becomes farce only at the end. It has a medium-sized cast, multiple settings, and pacing that reviewers said showed "indecision" and "sluggishness". It is so episodic in nature that one critic called it three one-act plays joined together by leading characters. It depicts the relationships of three ex-chorus girls with one another and with would-be paramours. The author never reveals what word she had in mind.

Produced and staged by William Harris Jr., with settings by Livingstone Platt, it starred Muriel Kirkland, Verree Teasdale, and Dorothy Hall. It ran on Broadway from September 1930 through May 1931. One reviewer criticized its moral quality even as he praised its writing and performance, while another put it on his end of season "Best Plays" list. The play was never published nor revived on Broadway, but was adapted for the film The Greeks Had a Word for Them in 1932. It was presented in the West End from November 1934 to May 1935 at the Duke of York's Theatre and then at the Cambridge Theatre starring Hermione Baddeley, Angela Baddeley, Margaret Rawlings and Robert Newton.

== Characters ==
Lead

- Schatze is a woman of German-American heritage, practical and even-tempered, if a little slow.
- Jean is a blonde of Italian-American heritage, the most glamorous and aggressive of the trio.
- Polaire is 19, a red-haired woman from the American South, the most intelligent of the trio.

Supporting

- Louis Small is a Wall Street broker whom Schatze is playing house with.
- Dey Emery is a sincere but callow youth in love with Polaire, the only man Jean can't get.
- Boris Feldman is a Russian concert pianist, whom Polaire and Jean scrap over.
- Justin Emery is Dey's middle-aged father, a very wealthy banker.

Featured

- Waiter in Night Club
- Russian Woman
- Jones
- Stanton
- Waiter
- Bellows

There are also three French aviators, who are either walk-on or completely off-stage characters in the final scene.

== Synopsis ==
Because the play was never published, this synopsis was compiled from contemporary newspaper reviews and articles.

Act I (Scene 1: A private backroom in a New York City nightclub) Schatze, Polaire, and Jean meet up after the latter's return from Paris. Polaire suggests Jean take up with Dey Emery, who has been plaguing her with his attentions. Louis Small and Dey Emery join the trio, introducing Boris Feldman who is with them.

(Scene 2: Boris Feldman's Apartment) Polaire, Jean, and Dey join Boris at his apartment. Boris is interested in Jean, who at first isn't. He bets her $5000 that she will be in love with him by the next morning. Meanwhile, an ignored Polaire has gone over to Boris' piano and begins playing. At once Boris forgets Jean and goes straight to Polaire. He likes her music and brags he can make her a concert sensation, but Polaire demurs. Now Jean wants Boris seeing Polaire's interest. Jean sneaks into Boris' bedroom and removes most of her clothes, letting the others think she had departed. Seeing Boris and Polaire are now clicking, Dey volunteers to leave. However, Polaire decides to leave too. Outside the apartment she stops to think things over, then turns back. But Boris, having decided to go to bed, doesn't answer the door, being now quite busy.

Act II The storyline here involved a stolen necklace.

Act III After proposing to Polaire, Dey Emery seeks his father Justin's approval. Justin gives it, but then steals Polaire away with his own proposal. Jean swoops in to capture the banker's attention. Jean and Justin become engaged and are at the Ambassador Hotel for the ceremony, when Polaire and Schatze sweep in to ply Jean with some drinks and their new-found friends, three French aviators. Soon Jean pulls off her wedding dress, throws a coat on, and abandons her groom to go to Paris with Polaire, Schatze and the fly-boys. (Curtain)

== Original production ==
=== Background ===
The play was still incomplete in May 1930 when William Harris Jr. flew to Hollywood from New York to discuss casting with Zoe Akins. She was busy with screenplays at Paramount Pictures but was able to finish the play by summer 1930.

The play was originally titled The Greeks Had a Name for It. Just before rehearsals started in August 1930, the title was changed to The Greeks Had a Word for It. Akins had made the decision back in July, before departing Hollywood for New York to begin casting, according to The Los Angeles Times.

The production was first announced as starring Muriel Kirkland, Martha Lorber, and Dorothy Hall. Lorber, a musical star, had a predilection for self-promotion not unlike the character of Jean she was slated to play. However, a week before the tryout it was reported that Verree Teasdale was joining the cast, and nothing further is heard of Martha Lorber in connection with this play.

=== Cast ===
Principal cast for the tryout in Newark and during the original Broadway run.
Role	Actor	Dates	Notes and sources
Schatze	Dorothy Hall	Sep 15, 1930 - May 2, 1931	
Jean	Verree Teasdale	Sep 15, 1930 - May 2, 1931	
Polaire	Muriel Kirkland	Sep 15, 1930 - May 2, 1931	She was signed for this play after quitting Strictly Dishonorable over long-standing sexual harassment.
Louis Small	Don Beddoe	Sep 15, 1930 - May 2, 1931	
Dey Emery	Hardie Albright	Sep 15, 1930 - Jan 17, 1931	Albright left when signed to a film contract with Fox Pictures for Young Sinners.
Dey Emery	TBD	Jan 19, 1931 - May 2, 1931	
Boris Feldman	Ernest Glendinning	Sep 15, 1930 - Dec ??, 1930	Often credited as "Glendenning", he left for a principal role in She Means Business.
Boris Feldman	TBD	Dec ??, 1930 - May 2, 1931	
Justin Emery	Frederick Worlock	Sep 15, 1930 - Mar ??, 1931	He left this play to replace the male lead Warren William in The Vinegar Tree.
Justin Emery	TBD	Mar ??, 1931 - May 2, 1931	
Waiter in the Night Club	Jack Bennett	Sep 15, 1930 - May 2, 1931	
The Russian Woman	Helen Kingstead	Sep 15, 1930 - May 2, 1931	
Jones	Harold Heaton	Sep 15, 1930 - May 2, 1931	
Stanton	Gordon Stout	Sep 15, 1930 - May 2, 1931	
Waiter	John Walpole	Sep 15, 1930 - May 2, 1931	
Bellows	Ethel Hamilton	Sep 15, 1930 - May 2, 1931	

=== Tryout ===
The play had a one-week tryout at the Broad Street Theatre in Newark, New Jersey starting September 15, 1930.

=== Premiere and reception ===
The Broadway premiere for The Greeks Had a Word for It occurred on September 25, 1930 at the Sam H. Harris Theatre. The Brooklyn Times Union reported the first night audience included Edward G. Robinson, Ina Claire, Frank Conroy, George Cukor, Mary Nash, Lee Shubert, John Van Druten, Robert Benchley, Texas Guinan, Mrs. Henry B. Harris, Edgar Selwyn and Ruth Selwyn.

Critical reaction was mixed, the most common complaints being with the episodic structure. Brooks Atkinson in The New York Times summed up his reaction: "One act interests you, though not without misgivings; the second alarms you by its daze and sluggishness, and then the third, which at last begins to give some heed to finding a conclusion, amuses you with some of the neatest dialogue Miss Atkins has written". He felt that the best part of the play was how the trio of Schatze, Jean, and Polaire interacted: "...[they] hurl short and ugly words at each other, pass cutting insults, steal, scratch and insinuate, and yet remain loyal as a group...". Atkinson said of the acting that "good performances are the rule throughout".

Arthur Pollock in the Brooklyn Daily Eagle admired Zoe Akins' writing but thought the play's mood uneven: "It is heavily ironic for two acts and then in the third turns into irony as light as farce... Part of that imperfect harmony may be due to the direction, as may perhaps the play's occasional sluggishness." Pollock's review was slightly compromised by his consistently referring to the play by its former title, The Greeks Had a Name for It. Like Atkinson, Rowland Field from the Brooklyn Times Union thought the play worked well only in the first and third acts, and its strongest point the intrarelations of the fortune-hunting trio. But as the theater season went on, he grew more enthusiastic about The Greeks Had a Word for It, and placed it in the second ten of his "Best Plays" list for 1930-1931.

Burns Mantle of the New York Daily News was positive about the play, at least for the sophisticated: "They will find it a perfectly played, smartly written, and boldly spoken story of three ex-Follies girls on the make". But he balanced this praise with a negative assessment of its content: "But that the play is essentially shallow, unblushingly bold and utterly without moral justification... is equally true". Robert Garland of the New York Telegram wrote in a breezy and irreverent style about the salacious language of the play, but also made a serious observation on its structure, that it was really a trio of one-act plays, with only the leading characters in common.

Columnist Gilbert W. Gabriel of the Universal Service was the only critic who claimed to know the "Word" of the title: "It turned out to be the word for ladies of professional ease, the hetira [sic]. It also, in spite of that nice title, turned out to be a pretty slack and tiring play". An article in the Brooklyn Daily Eagle reproduced a fragment from the Courtesan Dialogues (Note: Better known as the Dialogues of the Courtesans.) of Lucian of Samosata to illustrate the universality of discourse for Akins' modern hetairai.

A month after the premiere another columnist reported the play as gaining in popularity despite critical disapproval.

=== Closing ===
The Greeks Had a Word for It closed on May 2, 1931 at the Sam H. Harris Theatre, after 263 performances. (Note: The count includes a matinee and evening performance for the final day.) A planned road company was cancelled due to concerns about transportation costs.
