= Lord and Lady Algy =

Lord and Lady Algy may refer to:

- Lord and Lady Algy (play), an 1898 play by the British writer R.C. Carton
- Lord and Lady Algy (film), a 1919 American silent film adaptation
