= The Swan (play) =

1920 play by Ferenc Molnár

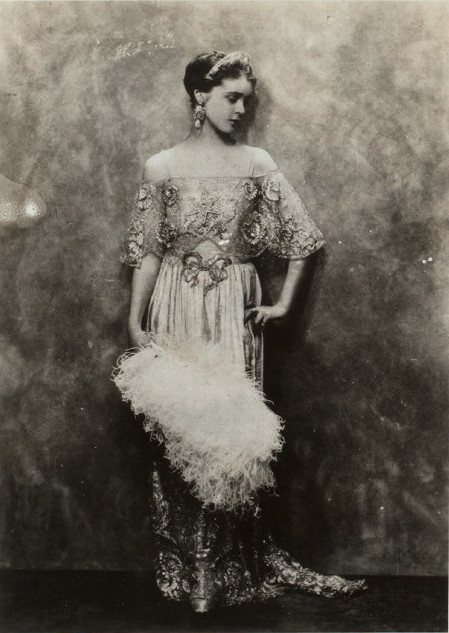
- Eva Le Gallienne in The Swan
- Original title: A hattyú
- Original language: Hungarian
- Written by: Ferenc Molnár
- Subject: Human cost of dynastic marriage
- Genre: Comedy
- Setting: The castle of Princess Beatrice circa 1905

Premiere
- Date: October 23, 1923
- Place: Cort Theatre
- Directed by: David Burton
- Original run: 243 performances

The Swan is a 1920 play by Ferenc Molnár, adapted from the Hungarian language A hattyú by Melville Baker. It is a three-act comedy with three settings and fifteen characters. The action of the play takes place within 24 hours. The story concerns a dethroned family of minor Germanic royalty, whose head hopes to marry her daughter (the Swan) to a crown prince, but runs into trouble by ill-using her sons' tutor. Though a comedy, the story contains tragic undercurrents, in the emotional suffering of the tutor and the futile dynastic scheming in the face of the coming Great War.

The play was produced by Gilbert Miller of The Charles Frohman Company. It was staged by David Burton, and starred Eva Le Gallienne with Basil Rathbone, Philip Merivale, Hilda Spong, and Halliwell Hobbes. It had tryouts in Detroit and Montreal before it premiered on Broadway during October 1923. Critics at the time likened the storyline to The Prisoner of Zenda without the melodrama. It ran to the end of May 1924 for 243 performances, but was then shut down by a labor dispute that affected other Broadway shows as well. It resumed in August 1924, running for another month.

The Swan was adapted for a silent film of the same name in 1925.

== Characters ==
Characters are listed in order of appearance within their scope.

Lead

- Dr. Nicholas Agi is 29, a doctor of philosophy, tutor to the princes, and fencing instructor to all, an amateur astronomer. (Note: The published play has his first name as Hans.)
- Princess Alexandra is single, aloof, proud, but dutiful, whose mother describes her age as "and twenty". (Note: The joke is more obvious in German, where numbers higher than 20 are expressed with the conjunction "and", e.g. one-and-twenty. Molnár's original audience would have understood the reference even though Hungarian doesn't form numbers this way.)

Supporting

- Princess Beatrice is the widowed mother of Alexandra, George, and Arsene. She is ambitious for her family.
- Father Hyacinth is Princess Beatrice's older brother Karl, who took holy orders in middle-age.
- Prince Albert is the crown prince of an unspecified country, a bachelor, not at all the fool he seems to be. (Note: Though the country is not named, the costume instructions for Prince Albert and Colonel Wunderlich specify Austrian uniforms.)

Featured

- Prince George is 17, outspoken but obedient elder son of Princess Beatrice.
- Prince Arsene is 16, quieter but more questioning younger son of Princess Beatrice.
- Symphorosa is Princess Beatrice's younger sister, who dances attendance on her.
- Colonel Wunderlich is an Uhlan officer and Prince Albert's military attendant.
- Count Luzen is Prince Albert's diplomatic attendant.
- Alfred is Caesar's assistant, and like him, a polyglot. (Note: During Act II of the published play, Caesar gives a long set of instructions to Alfred in French, to which Alfred replies in German, while Caesar then responds in Italian.)
- Caesar is the majordomo to Princess Beatrice, much put-upon by his mistress.
- Maid is a domestic in Princess Beatrice's service.
- Princess Maria Dominica is Prince Albert's domineering mother.
- Countess Erdely is Princess Maria's principal attendant.

Bit players

- Ladies in Waiting (2)
- Hussars (2)
- Lackeys (2)

== Synopsis ==
The source for this synopsis is a translation of The Swan made by Benjamin Glazer and published in 1922, while the translation used for the Broadway production was by Melville Baker. One scholar has pointed out while both men adapted multiple Hungarian plays into English, that Baker had been known to work from a French translation, and that such French adaptations were often made from Molnár's own translations of the original Hungarian into German.

Act I (Pavilion by the rose garden of Princess Beatrice's Castle. Afternoon.) Dr. Agi has finished a lesson on Napoleon for Princes George and Arsene, who remind their tutor of their mother's antipathy for the Usurper. (Note: Princess Beatrice blames Napoleon for her family's dethronement in 1806, when the Kingdom of Württemberg was created. She refuses to utter his name, as if it were a recent personal injury rather than a century old event.) Princess Beatrice and the boy's uncle, Father Hyacinth, speak with the tutor. Hyacinth is impressed with the tutor's knowledge and athleticism, as he also instructs the boys in rowing and fencing. Princess Alexandra comes in from her daily ride, and Father Hyancinth perceives Agi's suppressed feelings for her. Symphorosa continually updates Princess Beatrice about the castle's guest, Prince Albert, who is still sleeping. Beatrice tells Father Hyancinth about her plans for Alexandra and Albert, and how the Prince so far has seemed indifferent to her. Albert now appears, trailed by his attendants. He too is impressed with Dr. Agi, especially his knowledge of astronomy. While Agi leads the boys away to don their fencing gear, Beatrice suggests Albert may wish to inspect Alexandra's rose garden. But Albert is distracted by Col Wunderlich's talk of a modern dairy farm, and sets off with him and Count Luzen to inspect it. Beatrice is now anguished, for the Prince is scheduled to leave tomorrow. She determines to precipitate his jealousy by having Alexandra invite the tutor to attend that night's ball. Father Hyacinth is alarmed, thinking the scheme unwise and unfair to the tutor. Beatrice is adamant; nothing is more important than the family regaining influence. Alexandra is frozen-faced as she grasps what her mother is asking her to do. But she obeys, and the startled Agi is suffused with unexpected emotion as he realizes the Princess Alexandra is asking him personally to attend the ball. (Curtain)

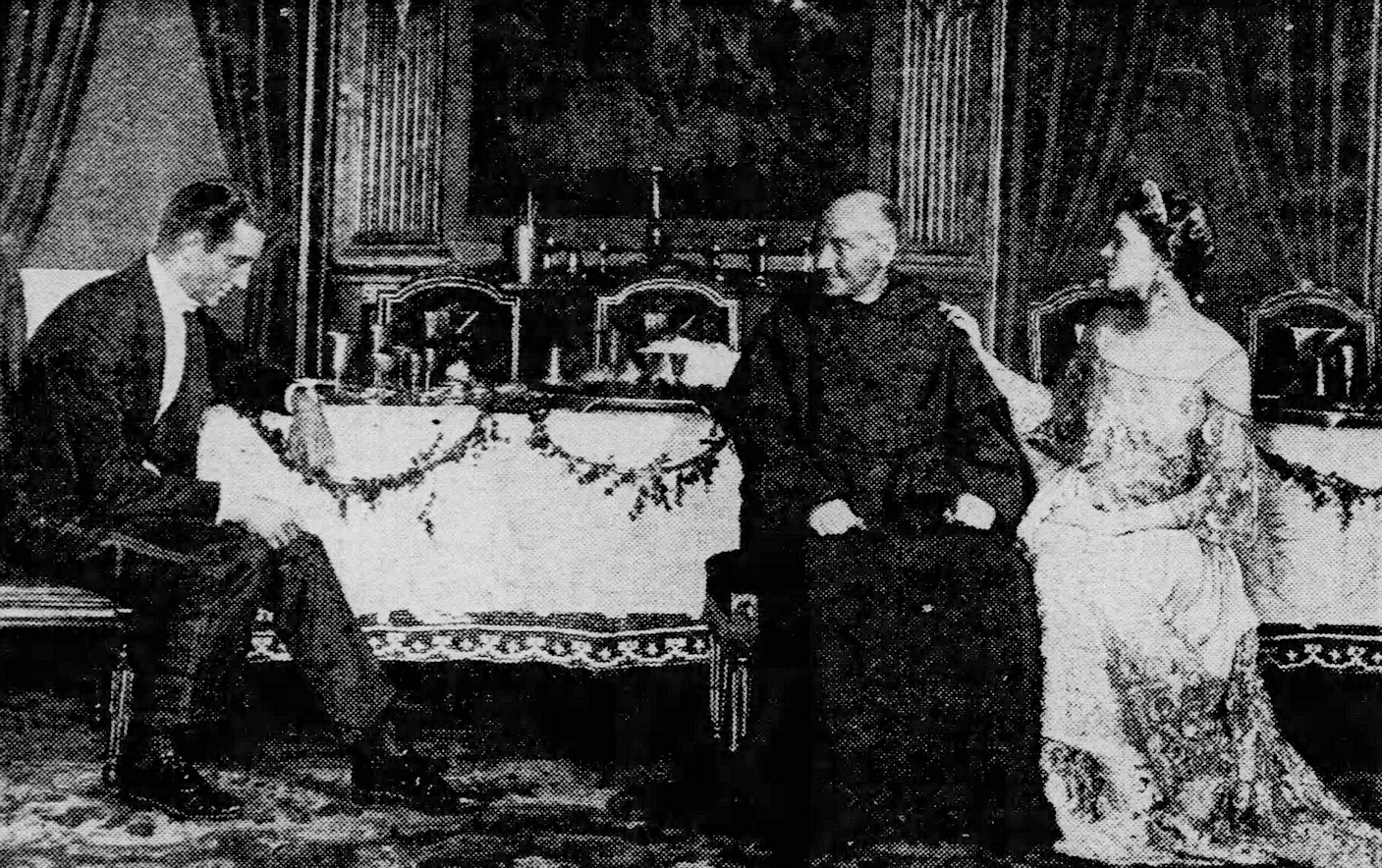

Act II (Reception room of the castle, that evening.) Caesar instructs Alfred on how to serve the private dinner following the public ball. Beatrice hears from Caesar that all courses will be cold, as Prince Albert prefers. Beatrice asks she be served hot tea instead of the cold consommé the others will get. Her nerves are stretched taut, both over the uncertainty of the scheme and the local notables seeing Alexandra associate with the tutor in the ballroom. Princess Alexandra enters, followed closely by Dr. Agi, talking to her of astronomy. She gently chides him for his constant attention, confusing him. Prince Albert and the others come in for the dinner party. Albert tells Beatrice that he has telegraphed his mother, Princess Maria Dominica, to come at once to the castle. Beatrice is overjoyed, for it means the Prince will propose to Alexandra through his formidable mother. It is clear Albert is now aware of Alexandra as a woman, for he begins to patronize the tutor in conversation. Agi, who has never tasted wine nor dined with aristocracy, empties his glass of Tokay in one gulp. To cover up the faux pas, Alexandra does the same. The effects of the heady vintage hit Agi hard, and he soon rises to the bait of Albert's patronizing tone, responding with words that verge on insult. Albert admires Agi's frankness, but his temper is clearly slipping. Beatrice, seeing victory vanishing, becomes overwrought and falls ill. Albert takes her to her room, followed by many others. Agi and Alexandra are left behind with Father Hyancinth, who tries to advise them. Agi knows his position has been lost, but felt intolerably put upon. Albert returns with his attendants; no longer in a mood for tolerance, he berates Agi. Alexandra, in sympathy with Agi's hopeless position, suddenly kisses him. At once, everyone's mood changes; Albert apologises to Agi and withdraws. (Curtain)

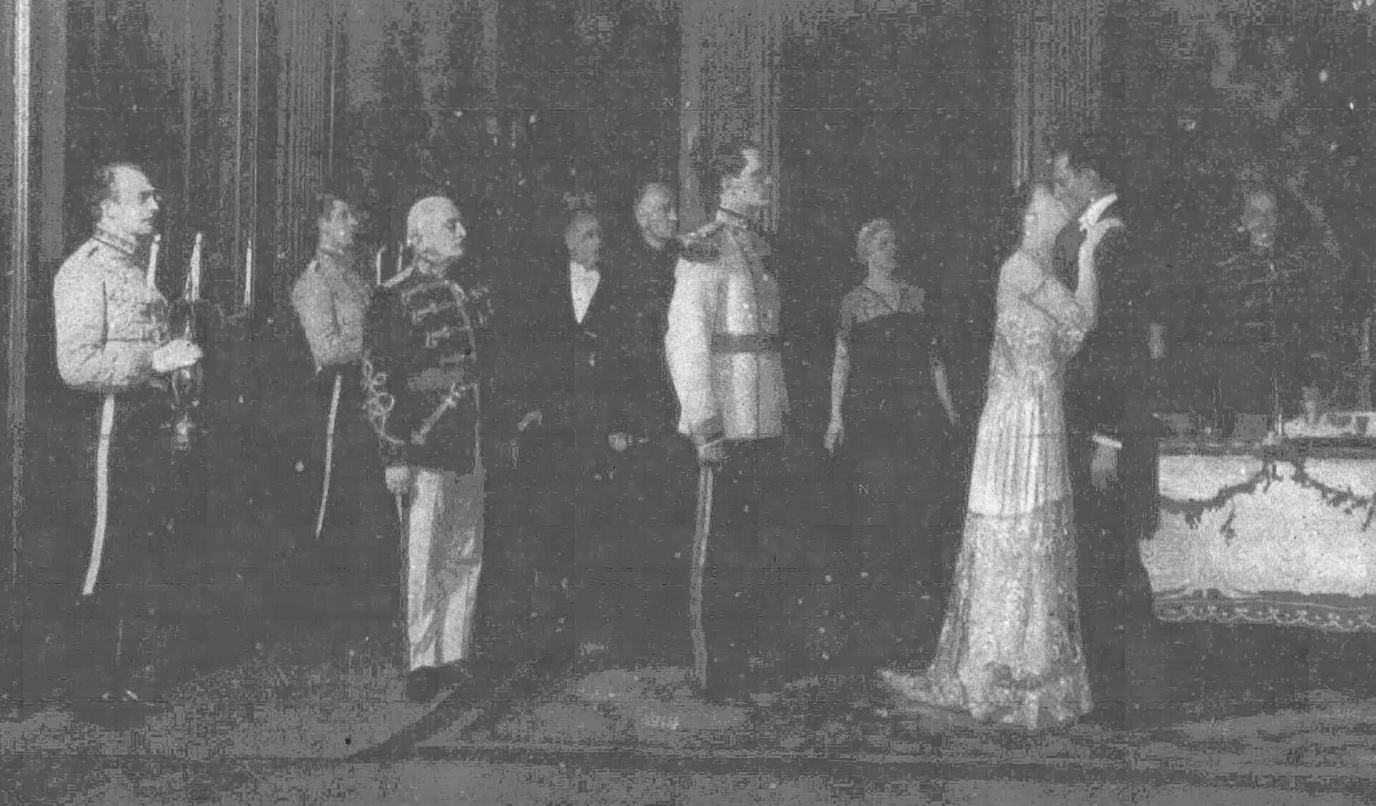

Act III (Drawing room of the castle, the next morning.) Beatrice encounters Father Hyacinth. She is agitated, both by Alexandra's late night confession to her, and the imminent arrival of Albert's mother by motorcar. Hyacinth reminds her of his warning about trifling with the tutor's emotions. She sends for the tutor but learns he is already packing to go. She goes to greet Princess Maria, as Alexandra enters. When Agi arrives she confesses the scheme to him, but he has already guessed. He will still leave despite her plea to stay, for what was intolerable to him was her kiss, which was plainly from sympathy not affection. Her brothers now come to say good-bye to their tutor. He departs the room with them, as Maria and Beatrice enter. Maria has not yet spoken with her son, so Father Hyacinth informs her of the previous night's doing, in such a way as to secure her sympathy for Alexandra. But it proves unnecessary, for Albert too has interpreted the kiss as did Agi, and still wants to marry Alexandra. He assures Alexandra that their marriage will be one in which love will come in time. (Curtain)

== Original production ==
=== Background ===
Molnár's play Launzi had been launched on Broadway under Arthur Hopkins two weeks before The Swan, with an adaptation by Edna St. Vincent Millay, (Note: Millay worked from verbatim German and English translations of the play.) scenic design by Robert Edmond Jones, and starring Pauline Lord. Critics were severe with Hopkins' staging, but Molnár's subject matter, madness due to unrequited love, was also thought morbid and unpopular. Tagged as a "Hungarian Ophelia", Launzi closed after thirteen days.

His earlier play Liliom had enjoyed a long run on Broadway under the auspices of the Theatre Guild, in which Eva Le Gallienne had played a poor servant girl. A proponent of contrasts, Ferenc Molnár asked for her to play the aloof Princess in The Swan. Gilbert Miller, recently put in charge of the Charles Frohman Company, obliged. Just as important, Miller engaged a rising young director, David Burton to stage it. Rehearsals began in mid-September 1923.

=== Cast ===
Principal cast during the Detroit and Montreal tryouts and the original Broadway run.
Role	Actor	Dates	Notes and sources
Nicholas Agi	Basil Rathbone	Oct 08, 1923 - May 31, 1924	
Princess Alexandra	Eva Le Gallienne	Oct 08, 1923 - May 31, 1924	
Princess Beatrice	Hilda Spong	Oct 08, 1923 - May 31, 1924	
Father Hyacinth	Halliwell Hobbes	Oct 08, 1923 - May 31, 1924	
Prince Albert	Philip Merivale	Oct 08, 1923 - May 31, 1924	
Prince George	George Walcott	Oct 08, 1923 - May 31, 1924	
Prince Arsene	Alan Willey	Oct 08, 1923 - May 31, 1924	
Symphorosa	Alice John	Oct 08, 1923 - May 31, 1924	
Colonel Wunderlich	Henry Warwick	Oct 08, 1923 - May 31, 1924	
Count Luzen	Carl Hartberg	Oct 08, 1923 - May 31, 1924	
Alfred	Stanley Kalkhurst	Oct 08, 1923 - May 31, 1924	Kalkhurst and George Walcott were the only American-born actors in the cast.
Caesar	Richie Ling	Oct 08, 1923 - May 31, 1924	
Maid	Nancie B. Marsland	Oct 08, 1923 - May 31, 1924	Marsland was an English-born actress married to Halliwell Hobbes at the time of this production.
Princess Maria Dominica	Alison Skipworth	Oct 08, 1923 - May 31, 1924	
Countess Erdely	Geraldine Beckwith	Oct 08, 1923 - May 31, 1924	

=== Tryouts ===
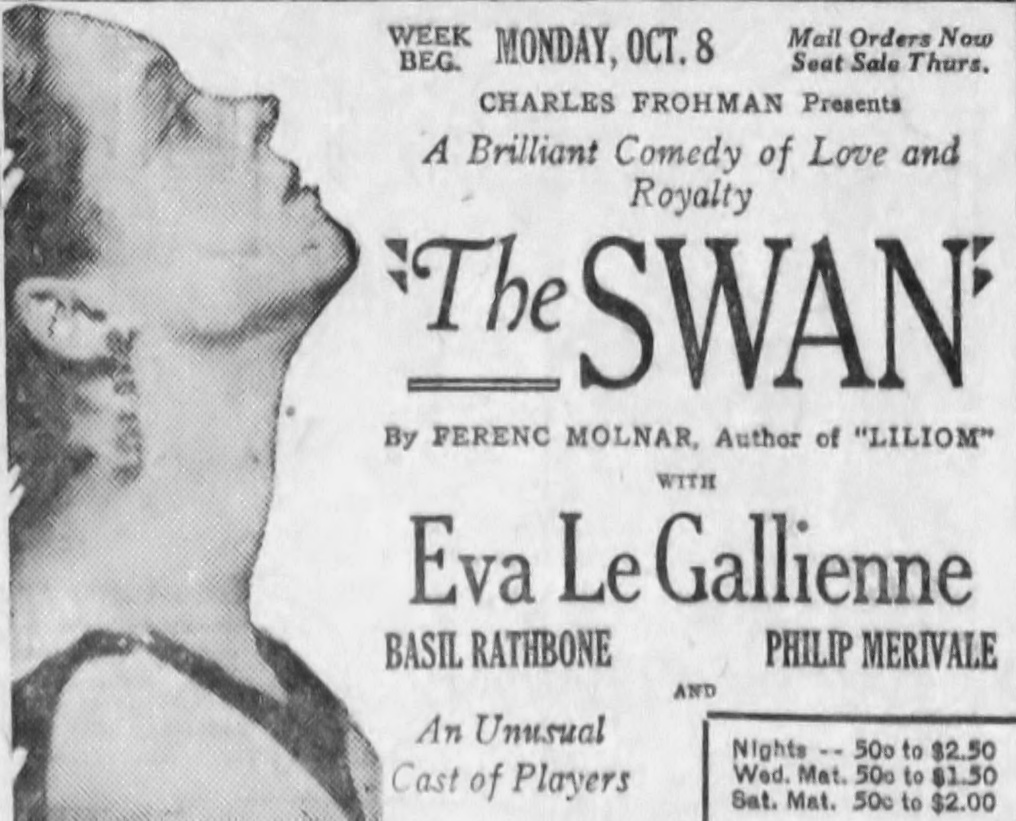

The first American performance of The Swan came with a one-week tryout at the New Detroit Theatre on October 8, 1923. The principal cast was the same as later on Broadway.

The production then went to Canada for a week, where it opened at His Majesty's Theatre, Montreal, beginning October 15, 1924. The local reviewer assumed that the setting was the Dual monarchy, and highlighted Molnar's contrasting "the rigid etiquette of such a household" as that of Princess Beatrice with the "human foibles, motives, affectations and antipathies by which his characters are swayed". The reviewer saluted the cast assembled by Gilbert Miller, with each of the principals coming in by name for individual praise.

=== Broadway premiere and reception ===
The Swan made its Broadway premiere at the Cort Theatre on October 23, 1923. Critic Arthur Pollock was wholly positive about the production: "It is a golden play, pure, clear, graceful, witty, wise... beautifully staged and superbly acted". The reviewer for The Brooklyn Daily Times was more perceptive of the work: "Molnar has written an ironic comedy... In it he has made the mask of tragedy transform its visage into laughter". Burns Mantle was playful about the author of what he called a royal family romance: "Catching Ferenc Molnar in a sane moment, with all his complexes tethered, someone must have induced him to write a play for the theatre rather than for his own satisfaction".

John Corbin in The New York Times said Molnar had "triumphed in romantic high comedy last night, as he has in so many and varied genres". Corbin said the first act moved slowly, while the last act was anticlimatic, but at the end of the second act "the audience rose to play and players with a spontaneity and intensity of enthusiasm which seldom have been surpassed in our theatre." The reviewer for The Brooklyn Citizen honored Molnar, saying The Swan was "by far the best thing he has written". They also complimented Gilbert Miller on restoring luster to the Charles Frohman Company. Metcalfe in The Wall Street Journal remarked: "It is hard to believe that The Swan and the late lamented Launzi are from the pen of the same Molnar. Such inequalities of product in our own time may help to establish the belief that Shakespeare wrote all of Shakespeare's plays".

In his syndicated column, Alexander Woollcott said The Swan was among the half-dozen best comedies he had seen in ten years of drama reporting, a credit to the author, cast, producer Gilbert Miller, and director David Burton. Arthur Pollock agreed about the staging, going so far as to blame Arthur Hopkins, who staged Launzi with its failure, and to contrast his directing unfavorably with that of David Burton for The Swan.

By early January 1924 the producers announced The Swan had twice broken box office records for gross receipts at the Cort Theatre. On February 15 and February 19, 1924, special matinees of The Assumption of Hannele, were given at the Cort Theatre. The production starred Eva Le Gallienne, with Basil Rathbone, Alice John, and Henry Warwick from the cast of The Swan among the players. John D. Williams, who was to direct, became ill and was replaced by Eva Le Gallienne. A third matinee was offered on February 26, 1924.

=== Broadway closing ===
The show was still doing good business in May 1924, but the five-year contract between Actors' Equity Association (Equity) and the Producing Managers Association would expire on June 1, 1924. A new contract, known as the 80-20 compromise, had been negotiated between Equity and the new Managers Protective Association, but The Swan and six other ongoing productions were still operating under the old contract. Accordingly, all cast members of The Swan had given in their quit notices to producer Gilbert Miller. The sole exception was Basil Rathbone; he was a member of Equity, but "held a peculiar contract that the Equity felt it could not interfere with." Miller decided the show could not continue, so it closed down after the Saturday night performance on May 31, 1924, at which point it had been performed 243 times on Broadway. (Note: According to "The Golden Dozen" feature of the New York Daily News for May 31, 1924, the play had 241 performances, not counting the matinee and evening shows for that Saturday.)

== Adaptations ==
=== Radio ===
- WEAF - Eva Le Gallienne performed a scene from The Swan in the WEAF studio, which was broadcast on November 27, 1923, at 6:30pm.
- WOR - Eva Le Gallienne from The Swan appeared in the WOR studio, broadcast on March 31, 1924, at 3:00pm.

=== Film ===
- The Swan (1925) - Silent film based on the play, which in turn became the source for later film adaptations. The cast included George Walcott who had played Prince George in the Broadway production.
- One Romantic Night (1930) - sound film directed by Paul L. Stein, with Lillian Gish in her talkie debut, Rod La Rocque, Conrad Nagel and Marie Dressler.
- The Swan (unmade film) - In 1940, William Hawks bought the stage and screen property of The Swan from David O. Selznick as first film for the United Producers Corp., to be released by RKO-Radio. It was going to star Ronald Colman and Joan Fontaine, Lewis Milestone was to direct, and the screenplay was being written by Charles S. Belden. However, the film was never made.
- The Swan (1956) - remake of the 1925 silent film, starring Grace Kelly and Alec Guinness. It was directed by Charles Vidor.

== Bibliography ==
- Franz Molnar. Fashions for Men and The Swan. Boni and Liveright, 1922.
- Emro Joseph Gergely. Hungarian Drama in New York: American Adaptations, 1908-1940. University of Pennsylvania Press, 1947.
