= Harold R. Heaton =

American cartoonist and actor

Harold Robertson Heaton
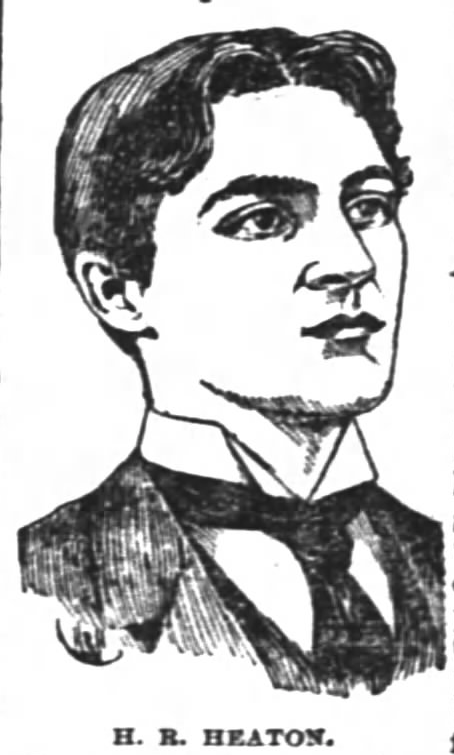
- Self portrait 1892
- Born: January 19, 1861; Salem, Illinois, U.S.
- Died: Circa 1939-1940
- Education: St. Louis School of Fine Arts
- Occupations: Cartoonist, actor
- Years active: Cartoonist 1887-1914; Actor 1899-1932

Harold Robertson Heaton (born January 19, 1861) was an American newspaper artist whose work focused on cartoons. His prodigious body of work contributed to the development of political cartoons. He also illustrated books and produced sketches and paintings. He left newspaper work in 1899 to begin acting on the stage, and later wrote plays as well. He returned to cartooning for six years beginning in 1908, but continued acting while doing so. He appeared in many Broadway productions through 1932. A brief retrospective on his employment with the Chicago Tribune, from October 1942, mentioned his obituary had been printed "a few years ago".

== Early years ==
Born in Salem, Illinois, he was the son of Charles Heaton, a civil engineer from England, and Amy Robertson from Missouri. Although born in Illinois, he spent much of his childhood in New York, before moving to St. Louis. As a boy and young man he went by "Harry Heaton".

He attended the St. Louis School of Fine Arts then worked on the Missouri Republican in St. Louis. In 1887 he was the first artist hired by the Chicago Daily Tribune, where he later headed the illustration department.

== Newspaper artist ==
=== Chicago Tribune ===
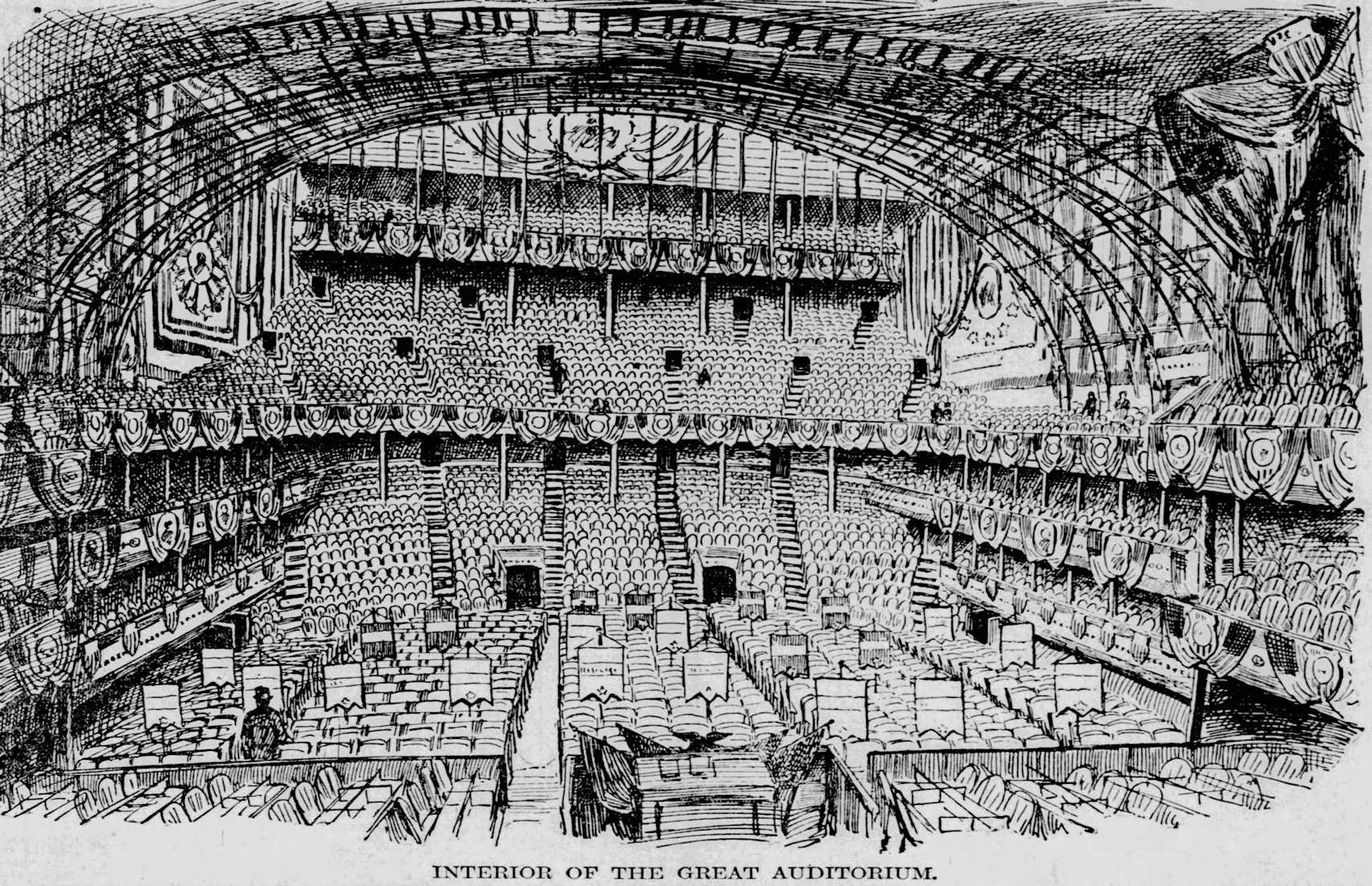
June 1888

The first drawings Heaton prepared for the Tribune were done using the "chalk plate" method (Note: A base plate of metal the height of type was coated with a plaster of paris compound about an eighth of an inch thick. The drawing was done upon the dried compound, then etched into the base plate using a steel needle.) at his own home. This gave way to the zinc etching method by the end of 1887. One drawing of the still incomplete but newly opened Auditorium Building for the 1888 Republican National Convention was reprinted fifty years later by the Tribune as an example of Heaton's skill.

Heaton's illustrations became some of the newspaper's most popular features, and his work was presented on the front page soon after he began working for the Tribune. During the 1890s he signed his newspaper artwork as "HRH", which led to the nickname "His Royal Highness". In 1893, he produced illustrated weekly commentaries on the World's Columbian Exposition. The newspaper had him continue the Events of the Week drawings long after the exposition closed, and later published annual compilations in book form.

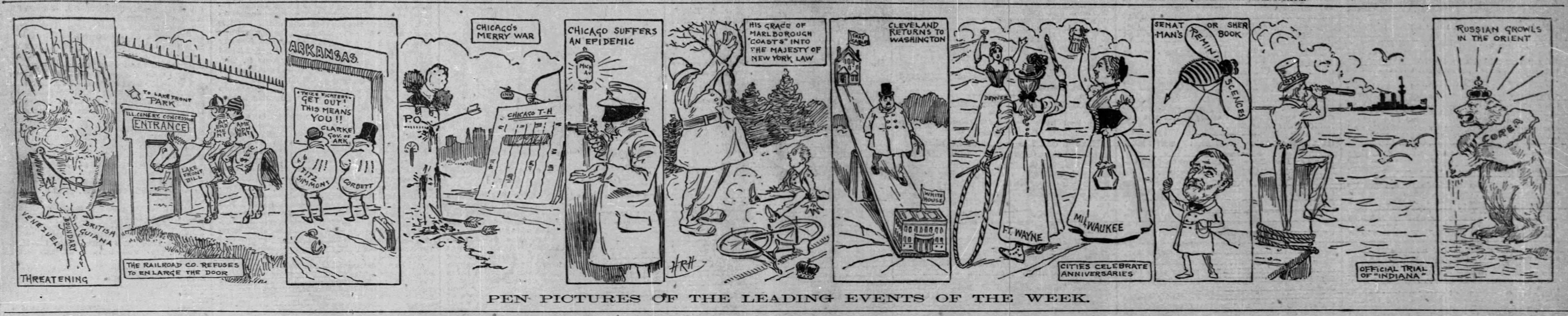
Oct 20, 1895

These "pen pictures" as the Tribune labelled them were a series of contiguous panels, a bit like a comic strip, though without a continuous storyline. Only the central panel bore the "HRH" signature. Besides drawing, Heaton also delivered lectures on newspaper illustrating to professional societies and social groups. During the later years of the 1890s he also started taking part in amateur theatricals. Heaton left the newspaper in the Fall of 1899 to pursue a stage career.

=== The Inter Ocean ===
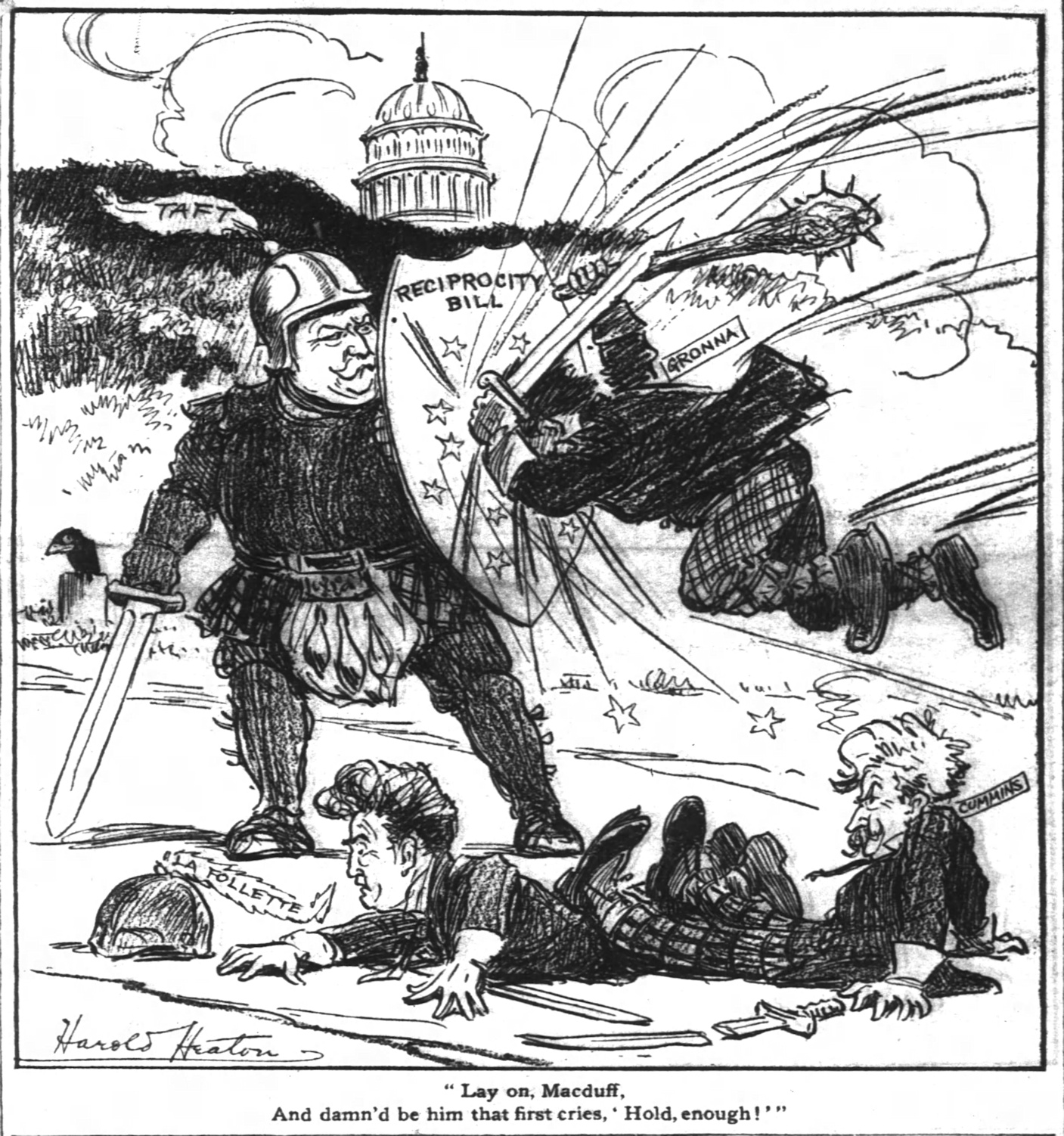
July 1911

In the fall of 1908 Heaton re-entered journalism by joining The Inter Ocean as an editorial cartoonist. Although his cartoons with The Inter Ocean began as wide-ranging commentaries on current events, he found his niche within the world of Chicago politics. His cartoons developed a particular focus on Chicago Mayor Fred Busse and State's Attorney John E. Wayman. For this time period, he signed his work as "Harold Heaton" and often inserted a small crow into drawings as a trademark. He gave a lecture on newspaper illustration to the Illinois Woman's Press Association in 1910, and with other newspaper cartoonists contributed drawings to the Actors' Fund Day special program, distributed in Chicago theaters on April 17, 1914.

At first appearing on the front page, his daily cartoon was moved to the editorial page 3 in later years. One cartoon, called "Merely a Passenger", won acclaim from a national group of bankers meeting in Washington, D.C. to lobby Congress for financial reform. However, a retrospective by a Chicago Tribune writer many years later claimed that though Heaton had good ideas, his style while at The Inter Ocean was out of date. His last drawing for the newspaper appeared on April 25, 1914, when the paper was already in receivership.

== Other artwork ==
Although best known for his cartoons and drawings for newspapers, Heaton was also an accomplished artist in both black-and-white sketches and water-color landscapes. He traveled a great deal for the latter, with pictures from Maine, Florida, and Tangier being noted at a Chicago exhibition in 1900. Heaton also traveled to Spain and Morocco for a book illustrating assignment in the early 1890s, and had several illustrations for magazine stories published during 1893–1895. His black-and-white pictures were favorably received at the Chicago Society of Artists annual exhibitions at the Athenæum. His artwork of all types was annually on exhibition at Anderson's Art Gallery and O'Brien's Art Gallery.

== Acting career ==
With the death of his mother in January 1899, Heaton decided to give up newspaper work for acting. An interviewer, visiting him in August 1899, was told if he'd come "a month hence, you wouldn't have found me here". Heaton expressed frustration with his inability to break into magazine illustration, saying a newspaper artist was typecast by publishers. According to Heaton, he'd wanted to quit newspaper work four years previously, but had his mother living with him.

=== Early stage work ===
William Gillette cast Heaton in Sherlock Holmes as Sir Edward Leighton, a role he would play from the play's first tryout in Buffalo, New York during October 1899 through its Broadway run up to its final tour in Boston during March 1901. When Gillette went to London with Sherlock Holmes, Heaton was again part of the cast, but he stayed on in England after the play closed. He spent a year in the United Kingdom with the James Welch company, playing at the Comedy Theatre in the West End of London and on tour in England and Wales with The New Clown.

Heaton's next stage work was for the American version of J. M. Barrie's The Admirable Crichton, which opened in November 1903. After it closed in March 1904, he formed a three-person troupe, (Note: The other two members were Lily Lorrell (ingenue) and Ada Boshell (character/comedian).) Harold Heaton & Company, which played a one-act farce of his own writing called The Rat on a vaudeville circuit. Heaton then joined the touring company for The Admirable Crichton starting in October 1904.

Heaton was again cast by William Gillette for a revival of Sherlock Holmes in March 1905. Heaton also wrote another one-act play, In the Artist's Studio, for Jessie Busley to use in vaudeville. He then joined Lawrence D'Orsay's troupe for the tryouts and Broadway run of The Embassy Ball in early 1906.

=== Lady Jim ===
The first full-length play Heaton wrote was this three-act comedy. Lady Jim had been purchased by Walter N. Lawrence in March 1906 as a vehicle for Hilda Spong, with rehearsals starting in August. Heaton and George Forster Platt staged the play, which featured Antoinette Perry. The play premiered on August 28, 1906, at Weber's Theatre.

The reception was severe; writing, staging, and acting all came in for criticism, with only the set design escaping censure. The New York Times was harsh and personal, asserting that "Harold Heaton" must be a nom de plume for a naive young girl, and disparaging Hilda Spong's acting. Despite some rewriting by Heaton and the producer, the show closed on September 19, 1906. Heaton spent the remainder of 1906 and part of 1907 on tour with The Embassy Ball. In early 1908 he played a role in a Julia Marlowe revival of When Knighthood Was in Flower.

=== Intermission ===
During the second half of 1908, Heaton took a position with The Inter Ocean as cartoonist. His acting slowed for several years, but he still took part in Chicago-based performances. Some were for benefits, another was a work called The Stolen Story, where the cast consisted of real newspapermen from Chicago papers. In 1911 he performed in a musical comedy called The Heart Breakers by Frank R. Adams and Will M. Hough, with songs by Harold Orlob and Melville Gideon, that ran for seven weeks. His cartoons, meanwhile, continued to appear in The Inter Ocean. By late April 1914, however, the newspaper was failing financially and Heaton's cartoons for it stopped.

=== Later stage work ===
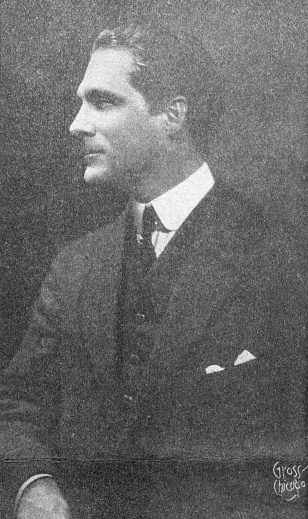
1916

For the next year Heaton continued to live in Chicago, appearing in and staging amateur productions for a variety of clubs, social groups, and Chautauqua assemblies. Sometime in 1915 he moved to Cincinnati, Ohio where he became active in the Little Theater movement there. He gave lectures at the Schuster-Martin School of Drama and staged plays at the attached Little Playhouse Company. In April 1916 he joined the touring Redpath Chautauqua, for which he wrote a new one-act play, Account Overdue (1916).

After several years with professional touring companies, Heaton returned to Broadway in 1920 with The Guest of Honor. William Hodge wrote and starred in it, and caught the full brunt of Heywood Broun's merciless review. Despite the savaging, the play lasted two months on Broadway then went on tour. At Chicago, critic Percy Hammond commiserated with Heaton's character losing the girl to the star, saying it was "no reward for a pleasant actor and a reformed cartoonist". Heaton's next Broadway role was in The Fan, which starred Helen Spong, who had evidently forgiven him for Lady Jim. He spent three years playing revivals with touring companies, before landing a character role in the Broadway version of Mozart in November 1926.

Heaton was then cast in two more Broadway plays, both involving Zoe Akins. For The Crown Prince in 1927, Akins adapted a play by Ernest Vajda from the Hungarian. The popular success, The Greeks Had a Word for It, was written by Akins in 1930. By this time Heaton was sixty-nine years-old, and relegated to a feature role, as he would be in Three Times the Hour in 1931.

=== Final performances ===
Heaton was a featured player in two Broadway productions during the first half of 1932, Happy Landing and The Boy Friend, (Note: This was not related to the later musical of the same name.) both of which lasted less than a month.

His last known acting work was for a play called Cain's Sister. It had a three-day tryout starting September 29, 1932 at the Shubert Theatre in New Haven, Connecticut, followed by a one-week tryout at the Broad Street Theatre in Newark, New Jersey. The producer then retired the play "for revision".

== Personal life ==
When he applied for a passport in April 1891, he was recorded as being 5 ft 11.5 in (181.6 cm) tall, with grayish-blue eyes and dark brown hair. The art critic James William Pattison said Heaton was tall and a clever "joke-maker". Besides drawing, painting, and acting, Heaton also played the piano, and wrote poetry. He had an active social life in 1890's Chicago, attending parties, balls, and the opera with such notables as Mrs. Fiske and Marshall Field. He was described by a reporter as "one of the pleasantest men I ever met, and surely one of the most versatile artists who ever worked on a metropolitan newspaper". He was a member of The Savage Club, a Chicago-based professional men's social club, and as late as 1932 was elected president of the Cartoonists' Club of Chicago.

== Works ==
=== Books ===
- Events of the Week: A Pictorial Record, (1894) - First series of HRH drawings, published by the Chicago Tribune.
- Events of the Week: A Pictorial Record, (1895) - Second series of HRH drawings, published by the Chicago Tribune.
- Events of the Week: A Pictorial Record, (1896) - Third series of HRH drawings, covering from December 1, 1894, through December 1, 1895, published by the Chicago Tribune.

=== Plays ===
- The Rat, (1904) - One-act domestic farce, played on vaudeville circuit by Harold Heaton & Company.
- In the Artist's Studio (1905) - One-act farce, first performed May 8, 1905 at Boston's Empire Theater.
- Dressing for Dinner, (1905) - One act play, originally written for and performed by Clara Bloodgood.
- A Friend in Need, (1905) - One-act farce presented on a matinee program by the American Academy of Dramatic Arts at the Empire Theatre, January 11, 1906.
- Lady Jim, (1906) - Heaton's first three-act play was not a success on Broadway.
- Where There Is Smoke, (1914) - One-act play, first performed by Hull House Players at the Hull House Theater.
- Account Overdue, (1916) - Written for the Redpath Chautaqua, and played on tour in 1916 and 1917.
- Alan Intrudes, (1917) - Three-act comedy, first performed in Cincinnati at Memorial Hall on March 19, 1918.
- The Third Generation, (1919) - Never produced.
- A Woman Had a Friend, (1920) - Society melodrama, never produced.

== Stage performances ==
By year of first performance, excluding amateur productions.
Year	Play	Role	Venue	Notes/Sources
1899	Sherlock Holmes	Sir Edward Leighton	Garrick Theatre; Touring company	His first professional acting job ran from 1899 to 1901 with William Gillette's company.
1901	Brother Officers	Captain Hutchinson	Lyceum Theatre	Heaton had joined the Lyceum Theatre stock company in Rochester, New York.
1901	Lord Chumley	Winterbottom	Lyceum Theatre	Heaton received mild praise for this and his previous work at the Lyceum.
1901	Uncle Tom's Cabin	Tom Loker	Lyceum Theatre	
1902	The New Clown	Capt. Jack Trent	Touring company Comedy Theatre	Heaton was with the James Welch company, which included Estelle Winwood, for a year.
1903	The Admirable Crichton	Rev. John Treherne	Wieting Opera House; Lyceum Theatre	After a tryout in Syracuse, J. M. Barrie's play came to Broadway in November 1903.
1904	The Rat	Jack Martin	Vaudeville circuit	Heaton's first known play, a one-act farce, performed by his own company.
1904	The Admirable Crichton	Rev. John Treherne	Touring company	William Gillette and the Broadway cast started the tour in Buffalo.
1905	Sherlock Holmes	Lightfoot McTeague	Empire Theatre	Revival by William Gillette.
1906	The Embassy Ball	Eugene Lewis	Daly's Theatre; Touring company	Heaton was in the Broadway run and touring company for this three-act play by Augustus Thomas.
1907	The Music Lesson		Vaudeville circuit	Heaton starred in this one-act play, which he performed well into 1908.
1908	When Knighthood Was in Flower	Sir Edwin Caskoden		This was at least the third revival by Julia Marlowe of the Paul Kester play.
1909	The Stolen Story	Himself		
1909	The Greatest Gift		People's Theater	Written by Charles W. Collins, drama critic for The Inter Ocean.
1911	The Heart Breakers	Soldier	Princess Theater	Musical comedy starred Sallie Fisher and George Damerel.
1913	Dressing for Dinner		Wilson Avenue Theater	Heaton starred in a revival of his own one-act play, with Ella Malinrose.
1918	Alan Intrudes		Memorial Hall	Three-act comedy by Heaton; he also staged and performed in it.
1918	Passers-By	Peter Waverton	Montauk Theatre	Heaton played the lead in this revival of a four-act comedy by C. Haddon Chambers.
1918	Eyes of Youth	Robert Goring	Touring Company	
1919	The Mood of the Moon		Touring company	Written by Cleave Kinkead.
1920	The Guest of Honor	Robert Thisby	Broadhurst Theatre; Touring company	
1921	The Fan	Jacques de Landeve	Punch & Judy Theatre	Adapted by Pitts Duffield from L'éventail by Robert de Flers and G. A. De Caillavet.
1922	Enter Madame	Gerald FitzGerald	Corinthian Theatre	Heaton was the male lead, playing the husband of an Italian diva.
1923	The Bat	Reginald Berenford	Touring company	
1926	Mozart	Grimbaud	Music Box Theatre	
1927	The Crown Prince	Adjutant Von Stucken	Forrest Theatre	
1930	The Greeks Had a Word for It	Jones	Sam H. Harris Theatre	A popular success that ran for 263 performances, from September 1930 through to May 1931.
1931	Three Times the Hour	John	Avon Theatre	
1932	Happy Landing	Robert Willis Granville	Forty-Sixth Street Theatre	Comedy about an amateur aviator, by John B. Hymer and William E. Barry, featured Margaret Sullavan.
1932	The Boy Friend	Butler	Morosco Theatre	Melodramtic nightclub farce about chorus girls, gangsters, and reporters, by John Montague.
1932	Cain's Sister		Shubert Theatre; Broad Street Theatre	Written by Leila Wells and staged by Jacob Ben-Ami, it starred Gale Sondergaard and Walter Armitage.
