= Lady Huntworth's Experiment =

Katherine Compton as Caroline Rayward/Lady Huntworth, 1907 London revival

Lady Huntworth's Experiment is a three-act comedy by R. C. Carton, first presented in London in 1900. It depicts an aristocrat working under an assumed name as a cook, and finding happiness with a retired military man. After its West End run, it was played by touring companies around Britain, and was staged on Broadway and in Australia and New Zealand.

== Production ==
The play was presented at the Criterion Theatre, London, by the actor-manager Charles Wyndham. It ran for 163 performances, from 26 April to 13 October 1900.

=== Original cast ===
- Captain Dorvaston (late Bengal Cavalry) – Arthur Bourchier
- Rev Audley Pillenger – Eric Lewis
- Rev Henry Thoresby (his curate) – A. E. Matthews
- Gandy (manservant at vicarage) – Ernest Hendrie
- Newspaper boy – Reginald Denny
- Mr Crayll – Dion Boucicault Jr.
- Hannah Pillenger (Audley's sister) – Fanny Coleman
- Lucy Pillenger (their niece) – Gertrude Elliott
- Keziah (housemaid at vicarage) – Pollie Emery
- Caroline Rayward (cook at vicarage) – Katherine Compton

Source: The London Stage, 1900–1909.

=== Production history ===
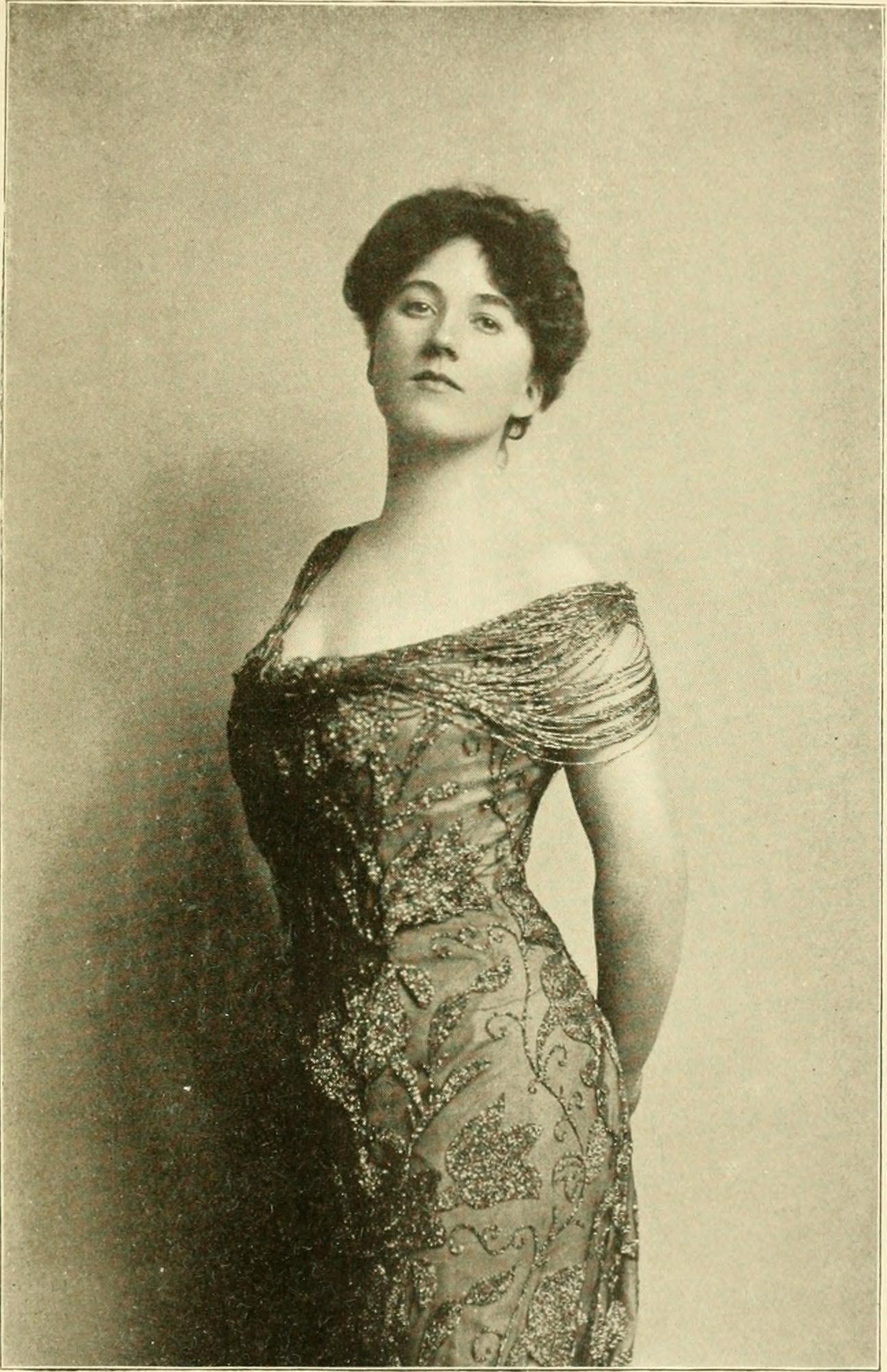
Hilda Spong as Lady Huntworth, Broadway, 1900

Later in 1900 two touring companies presented the play in the British provinces. A Broadway production, starring Hilda Spong, ran from December 1900 to March 1901, for 86 performances. Robert Brough presented the play in Australia and New Zealand in 1901.

The piece was revived in London in 1907; Compton reprised her role of Caroline, and was joined by Charles Hawtrey as Captain Dorvaston and Weedon Grossmith as Lord Huntworth. The play was given by a specially assembled company to entertain the troops during the First World War, and was revived in the provinces in 1918.

== Plot ==
Caroline Rayward, cook to the Rev Audley Pillenger, vicar of Stillford, is in fact Lady Huntworth. She was married to a drunken and abusive husband and endured eleven years of matrimonial misery before Lord Huntworth divorced her on a spurious charge of adultery so that he could pursue a rich widow. Thrown on her own resources, she has assumed a new identity and made use of her chief talent, which is for cooking. Also in the vicarage are Pillenger's sister, Hannah, and their niece, Lucy. The latter is betrothed, at her family's behest, to Captain Dorvaston, a genial, honest and not overbright officer retired from the Indian Army. He is not in love with Lucy, nor she with him. She loves the Rev Henry Thoresby, her father's mild young curate, and is resolved to marry him despite her family's wishes. The vicar, Gandy (his manservant), and the captain are all much taken with Caroline, and each plans to meet her in her kitchen on an evening when her fellow-servants are absent and the other inmates of the house have gone to a penny reading.

After Caroline has discouraged Gandy's hopes, and before the vicar and Dorvaston arrive, a "Mr Crayll" intrudes. He is in fact Lord Huntworth, in his usual drunken state; he has come to ask his former wife to return to him. The reason for his pretended repentance is that he knows – as she does not, until now – that Caroline has come into a fortune. She scornfully rejects his offer and leaves him to sleep off his drunkenness in the scullery. The vicar enters, proposes marriage and is refused. On hearing someone approaching, he takes refuge in the larder. The new arrival is the captain, whose honest admiration touches Caroline. A third arrival – the vicar's sister – sends Dorvaston into hiding in a broom cupboard, where she discovers him and will hear no explanations. The act ends with the Captain, at Caroline's request, carrying out the sleeping Lord Huntworth to put him in a dry ditch at the bottom of the garden.

In the last act Caroline appears in fashionable walking-dress, declares her true identity to the vicar and his sister, and takes leave of them. Before she goes, she gives Dorvaston the address "Poste restante, Brussels", where a letter will find her. Lucy and Thoresby return, having been made man and wife; Dorvaston, now free from his engagement to Lucy, joyfully prepares to follow Caroline to the continent.

== Critical reception ==
The Graphic judged the play to be the work of "a dramatist with a master hand". The Times thought the plot predictable towards the denouement, but praised the dialogue "liberally sprinkled with very passable witticisms", "little touches of genuine observation" in the characterisation, and the general air of "frankness, freshness and good humour". The Era said, "The humour of the dialogue is delightful, the drollery of the situations is irresistible, but what we like even more are the touches of true sentiment and the evidences of observation which are striking and frequent". When the play opened on Broadway, The New York Times found it "new and exceptionally bright and entertaining", and commented that it contained "passages of pure farce" and others of "dignity and feeling".

== References and sources ==
=== Sources ===
- Wearing, J. P. (1981). The London Stage, 1900–1909: A Calendar of Plays and Players. Metuchen: Scarecrow Press. OCLC 1245534136.
