= George Walcott =

American actor (1911–1967)

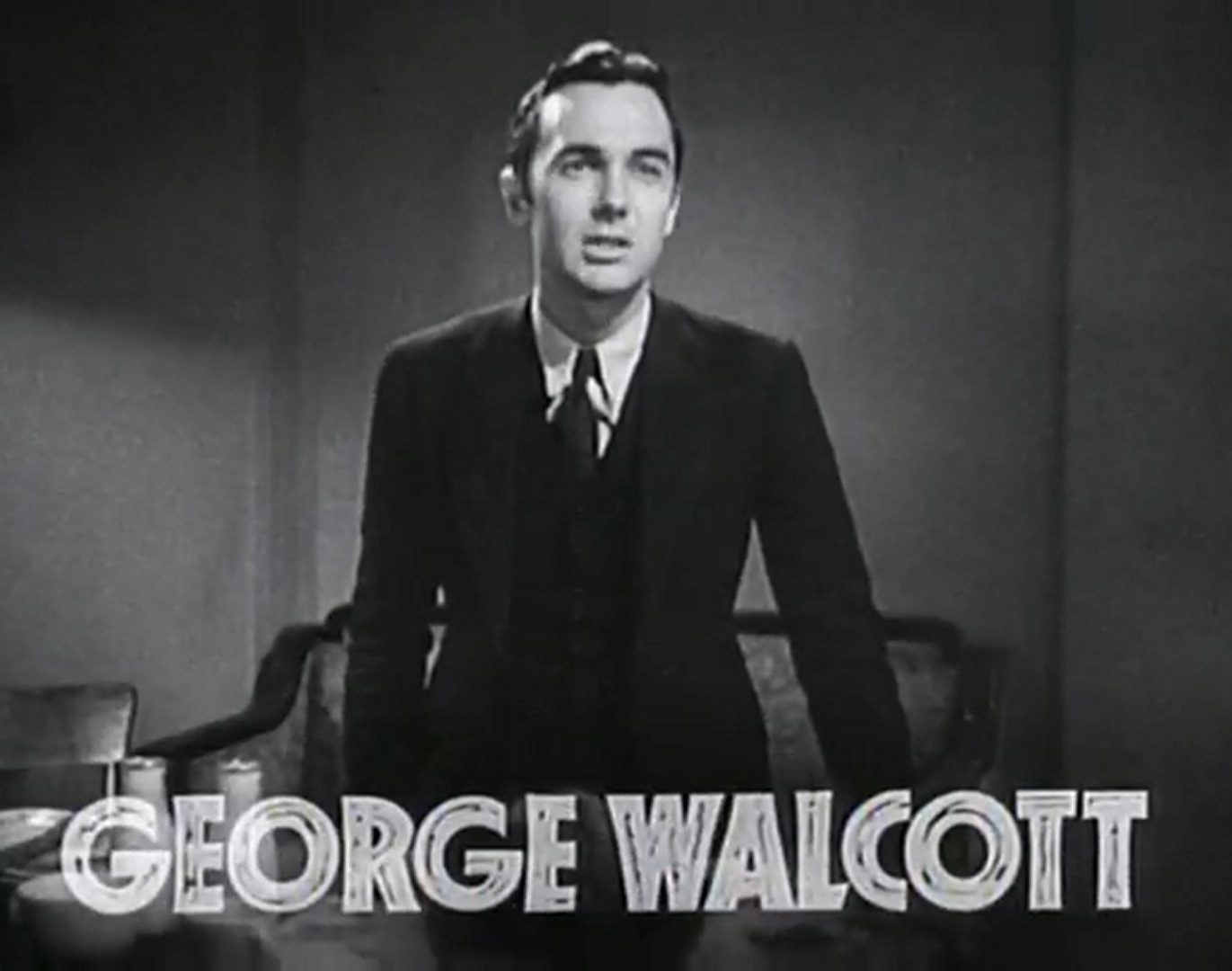
- Walcott in Fury (1936)
- Born: William George Walcott; August 22, 1911; Chicago, Illinois, U.S.
- Died: June 14, 1967 (aged 55); Los Angeles, California, U.S.
- Other name: George Wolcott
- Occupation: Actor
- Years active: 1920–1942

William George Walcott (August 22, 1911 – June 14, 1967) was an American actor. He was best known for playing Tom in the 1936 film Fury.

== Early life ==
William George Walcott was born August 22, 1911, in Chicago, Illinois, the son of William Walcott and Florence Stevens. His family moved to New York City by 1920, where he began his acting career as a child, appearing on stage in The Betrothal by Maurice Maeterlinck and on film with Billie Burke in Away Goes Prudence. An elevator accident in July 1920, injured his leg and temporarily derailed his acting, for which his father sued and received a large settlement. Walcott recovered well enough to perform in long runs for Broadway stage productions such as The Swan (1923), and Young Woodley (1925).

Walcott continued his screen career in 1935, appearing in the short film Hit-and-Run Driver in the role of George Lambert. In 1936, Walcott learned to fly an airplane and earned a pilot's license. In the same year, he co-starred as Tom in the film Fury.

== Career ==
Walcott co-starred and made appearances in films such as Honeymoon in Bali, The Great Hospital Mystery, The Storm, Borrowing Trouble, Western Jamboree, The Great Victor Herbert, The Mandarin Mystery and The Forgotten Woman. In the film Born Reckless, he was credited as George Wolcott. He played the role of Barbara Stanwyck's character brother Charlie Martin in the 1937 film Stella Dallas. He also starred as Tony Wonder in the 1938 film Cocoanut Grove, starring along with Fred MacMurray and Harriet Nelson. He appeared in the films Sailor's Lady, Submarine Raider, The Man Who Wouldn't Talk, Rhythm on the River and Buck Benny Rides Again.

Walcott retired from acting after World War II, when he lost one of his legs. He last appeared in the 1942 film Quiet Please, Murder, playing the uncredited role of Benson. After retiring from acting, he worked as a manager of United Artists theatres.

== Death ==
Walcott died on June 14, 1967, in Los Angeles, California, at the age of 55.
