= Katherine Compton =

English actress

Compton, c. 1890

Katherine Julia Mackenzie (10 November 1849 – 16 May 1928) was an English actress, professionally known as Katherine Compton, or, more usually, Miss Compton. She was best known for her appearances in the comedies written by her husband R. C. Carton, between 1885 and 1922.

== Life and career ==
=== Early years ===
Compton was born on 10 November 1849 in London, the youngest of the seven children of the actor Henry Compton – whose real name was Charles Mackenzie – and his wife Emmeline Catherine, née Montague (1823–1911). The Times said of her theatrical family:

Miss Compton's grandfather and father were comedians of note in the early Victorian and mid-Victorian theatre. Henry Compton, her father, who died in 1877, was among the first eccentric comedians of his time, scarcely less popular than his renowned contemporaries, Buckstone and Keeley. The humorous imperturbability, which was a marked characteristic of Miss Compton's art, was inherited from her father, whose stolid self-complacency in many of his parts ... delighted Victorian playgoers. Henry Compton's five sons and two daughters were all actors and actresses. The best known of his sons, the late Edward Compton, founder of the Compton Comedy Company, was the father of two actor-sons and three actress-daughters, the youngest of whom is Miss Fay Compton.

Compton was originally destined for a musical career, but abandoned it and made her first appearance on the stage at the Theatre Royal, Bristol in October 1874 in Mary Scott-Siddons's company, playing Maria in The School for Scandal. The Bristol Times thought she played the part "very naturally". She remained with the Bristol and other provincial companies for three years. In 1876 she married a fellow-actor from the Bristol company, R. C. Carton; they had one daughter.

Compton's London debut was in another Sheridan play, The Rivals, as Julia at the Gaiety Theatre in May 1877. In 1878 she was engaged at the St James's Theatre under Mrs John Wood's management, appearing as Lucy in Such is the Law, Princess Lydia in The Danischeffs and in other plays. In 1881 she appeared at Toole's Theatre, as Mrs Parminter Blake in Pinero's Imprudence, and in 1884 was at the Globe in the same author's comedy, Low Water. She played classical roles including Portia in The Merchant of Venice and Kate Hardcastle in She Stoops to Conquer and Celia in As You Like It.

=== In Carton's plays ===
"A Typical Miss Compton Part", 1922

A turning point in Compton's career came in 1885, with the production of her husband's first play (written in collaboration with Cecil Raleigh), The Great Pink Pearl. According to The Times, "That play was so successful that Mr Carton, hitherto an actor, was encouraged to devote himself entirely to playwriting. In the part of a Russian Princess Miss Compton gave a foretaste of the great lady, dignified, drily humorous and imperturbable, which was to be her characteristic part in later years". Thereafter she appeared mainly in plays written by her husband, who wrote leading female roles in his works with her in mind. In the 1880s there was Juno Johnstone in The Treasure, Strand Theatre, 1888. In the 1890s there were Mrs Bute Curzon in Robin Goodfellow, Garrick Theatre, 1893; Lady Gwendoline in A White Elephant, Comedy Theatre, 1896; and Lady Algy in Lord and Lady Algy, Comedy, 1898. In the last of these her co-star was Charles Hawtrey, and Henry Kemble, Eric Lewis, A. E. Matthews, Frederick Volpe and Arthur Williams were in the cast. Her last play of the decade was Carton's Wheels Within Wheels at the Criterion Theatre in 1899.

In the 1900s she played seven roles in plays by her husband: Lady Huntworth in Lady Huntworth's Experiment, Criterion, 1900; Countess Zechyadi in The Undercurrent, Criterion, 1901; Mrs Auberton in A Clean Slate, Criterion, 1903; Mrs Repton in The Rich Mrs Repton, Duke of York's Theatre, 1904; the Duchess of Braceborough in Mrs Hopkinson, Avenue Theatre, 1905; Lady Diana Caldershaw in Public Opinion, Wyndham's Theatre, 1905; and Joanna, Countess of Rushmere in Mr Preedy and the Countess, Criterion, 1909. Later appearances in his works included the Marchioness of Glenmoray in Eccentric Lord Comberdene, St James's, 1910; Mrs Stanhope Molyneux in The Bear Leaders, Comedy, 1912; Mrs Cosmo Carrington in A Busy Day, Apollo Theatre, 1915; Lady Cardonnell in The Off-Chance, Queen's, 1917; Lady Jemima Ballardaile in The Choice, Wyndham's, 1919; Lady Hammergallow in The Wonderful Visit, St Martin's Theatre, 1921; and Lady Conroy in Other People's Worries, Comedy, 1922.

The Times recalled:

None of these great, shrewd, kindly, and exasperating ladies was a mere double of another; but Carton had learned precisely how to bring out the funniest effects of Miss Compton's deep-toned drawl, her deceptively vacant smile, her stately deliberation (which usually enraged some character in the play, and always set the audlience laughing), and her consummate knowledge of how to make the points. It all seemed very easv, like the art of Charles Hawtrey and of Henry Kemble – until one saw and heard someone else trying to do it.

Compton died at the age of 77 at her house in Acton, London, on 16 May 1928, a little over a month after her husband's death.

== References and sources ==
=== Sources ===
- Parker, John, ed. (1922). Who's Who in the Theatre (fourth ed.). London: Sir Isaac Pitman and Sons. OCLC 473894893.
