= R. C. Carton =

English actor and playwright (1853–1928)

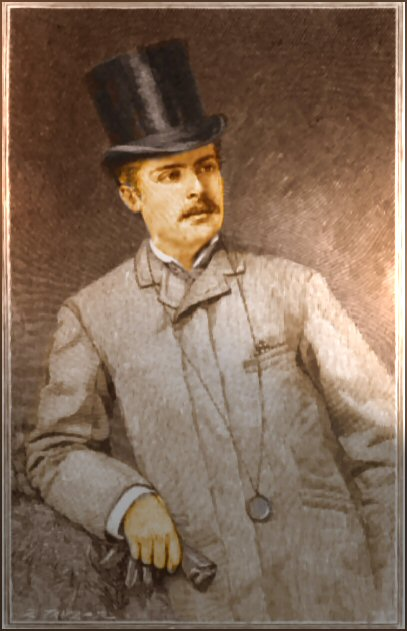
- R. C. Carton, 1879
- Born: Richard Claude Critchett; 10 May 1853; London, UK
- Died: 1 April 1928 (aged 74); London, UK
- Occupations: Playwright, actor
- Spouse: Katherine Julia Mackenzie Compton (m. 1876)

R. C. Carton (born Richard Claude Critchett, 10 May 1853 – 1 April 1928) was an English actor and playwright.

== Life and career ==
Carton was born in London on 10 May 1853, a son of the oculist George Critchett and his wife Martha née Brooker. A brother, Anderson Critchett, later became the royal oculist. Carton trained as an architect, but turned to the theatre and began his career as an actor at the New Theatre Royal, Bristol in March 1875, in The Sea of Ice, and made his first appearance in London, at the Lyceum Theatre on 19 June 1875, as Osric in Henry Irving's production of Hamlet.

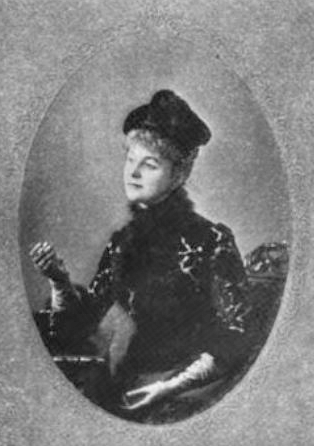
Katherine Compton

In 1876 he married Katherine Julia Mackenzie – the eldest daughter of the actor Edward Compton – who acted under the stage name Katherine Compton. Carton played in Queen Mary, 1876, New Men and Old Acres, 1878, Truth, 1879, The Rivals, 1880, Low Water, 1884, The Private Secretary, 1884 and Bad Boys, 1885, after which he retired from acting.

As a playwright his first plays were written in collaboration with Cecil Raleigh, and included The Great Pink Pearl, 1885; The Pointsman, 1887, and The Treasure, 1888.

His first play written alone was Sunlight and Shadow, produced at the Avenue Theatre in 1890, by George Alexander. His other plays of the 1890s were Liberty Hall, St James's Theatre, 1892; Robin Goodfellow, Garrick Theatre, 1893; The Fall of the Leaf, 1893; The Home Secretary, Criterion Theatre, 1895; The Squire of Dames, Criterion, 1895; A White Elephant, Comedy Theatre, 1896; The Tree of Knowledge, St James's, 1896; Lord and Lady Algy, Avenue, 1898; and Wheels Within Wheels, Court Theatre, 1899.

Carton's plays from 1900 onwards were Lady Huntworth's Experiment, Criterion, 1900; The Ninth Waltz, Garrick, 1900; The Undercurrent, Criterion, 1901; A Clean Slate, Criterion, 1902; The Rich Mrs Repton, Duke of York's Theatre, 1904; Mr Hopkinson, Avenue, 1905; Public Opinion, Wyndham's Theatre, 1905; Lady Barbarity, Comedy, 1908; Mr Preedy and the Countess, Criterion, 1909; Lorrimer Sabiston, Dramatist, St James's, 1909; Eccentric Lord Comberdene, St James's, 1910; An Eye-Opener, London Coliseum, 1911; The Bear Leaders, Comedy, 1912; A Busy Day, Apollo Theatre, 1915; The Off-Chance, Queen's Theatre, 1917, Nurse Benson (with Justin Huntley McCarthy), Globe Theatre, The Wonderful Visit, St Martin's Theatre, 1921; and Other People's Worries, Comedy, 1922.

Carton died in London on 1 April 1928, aged 74. His widow outlived him by a few weeks, dying at their London home on 18 May 1928.

== Sources ==
- Parker, John, ed. (1922). Who's Who in the Theatre (fourth ed.). London: Sir Isaac Pitman and Sons. OCLC 473894893.
