= Young Sinners (play) =

1929 play by Elmer Harris

Young Sinners is a comedic play by Elmer Harris that first premiered at the Morosco Theatre in New York on November 28, 1929. The three act play was first revived at the New Yorker Theatre on April 20, 1931. It was then revived again at the Ambassador Theatre in New York on March 6, 1933. The cast changed during each revival, but Dorothy Appleby played Constance Sinclair in the original and the two revivals. The 1931 film Young Sinners is based on the play.

== 1933 cast ==
- Maida Carrell as Madge Trowbridge
- Paul Clare as Bud Springer
- Virginia Lloyd as Betty Biddle
- David Morris as Jimmy Stephens
- John Bramhall as Butler
- Dorothy Appleby as Constance Sinclair
- Hilda Spong as Mrs. Sinclair
- Alfred Hesse as Baron von Konitz
- Jackson Halliday as Gene Gibson
- Percy Moore as John Gibson
- Arthur Bower as Trent
- Ralph Sumpter as Manager of Apartment House
- Dorothy Dianne as Alice Lewis
- Frank Shannon as Tom Maguire
- Paddy Reynolds as Maggie Maguire
- Freddie Stange as Tim
