= Young Sinners (1931 film) =

1931 film

- Directed by: John G. Blystone
- Written by: Maurine Watkins; William Conselman
- Based on: Young Sinners by Elmer Harris
- Starring: Thomas Meighan; Hardie Albright; Dorothy Jordan
- Cinematography: John F. Seitz
- Edited by: Ralph Dixon
- Distributed by: Fox Film Corporation
- Release date: May 17, 1931 (US)
- Running time: 79 minutes
- Country: United States
- Language: English

Young Sinners is an American Pre-Code drama film released on May 17, 1931, directed by John G. Blystone. The screenplay was initially written by Maurine Watkins though the script filmed was William Conselman's, not Watkins'. (Watkins' script is in the archives of 20th Century Fox's produced scripts). Conselman scrapped her screenplay in favor of his own (adaptation, continuity and dialog, according to American Film Institute) based on the play Young Sinners by Elmer Harris (New York, November 28, 1929).

== Cast ==
- Thomas Meighan as Tom McGuire
- Hardie Albright as Gene Gibson
- Dorothy Jordan as Constance Sinclair
- Cecilia Loftus as Mrs. Sinclair
- James Kirkwood as John Gibson
- Edmund Breese as Trent
- Lucien Prival as Baron von Konitz
- Arnold Lucy as Butler
- Nora Lane as Maggie McGuire
- Joan Castle as Sue
- John Arledge as Jimmy
- Edward Nugent as Bud
- Yvonne Pelletier as Madge
- Steve Pendleton as Reggie
- Billy Butts as Tim
