= Lord and Lady Algy (play) =

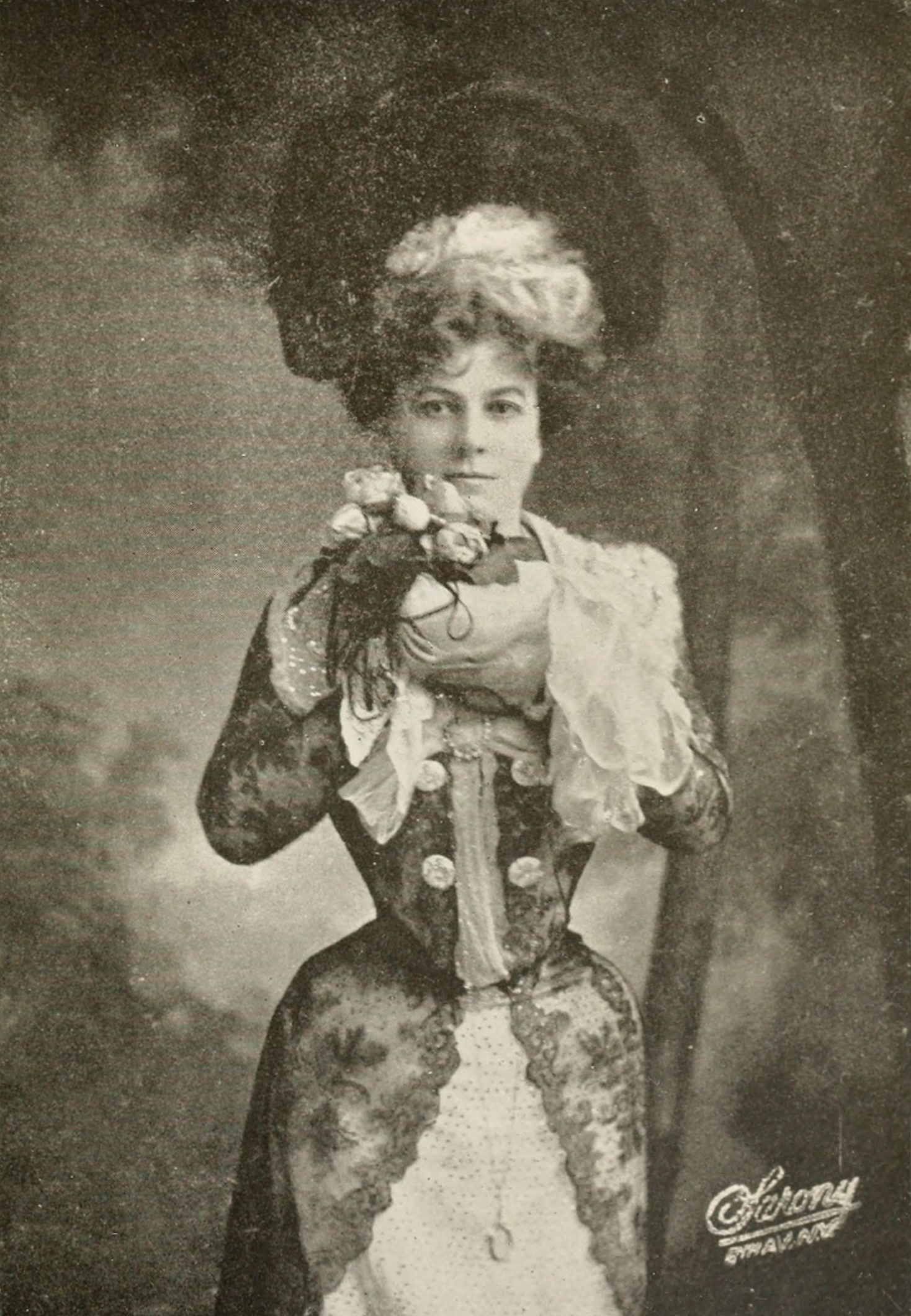
Jessie Millward as Lady Algy

Lord and Lady Algy is a comedy play by the British writer R. C. Carton which premiered in London in 1898, starring his wife, Katherine Compton, and Charles Hawtrey.

Lord and Lady Algy was first staged on Broadway at the Empire Theatre where it opened on February 14, 1899. The cast included William Faversham as Lord Algernon Chetland, Jessie Millward as Lady Algernon Chetland, J. Harry Benrimo as the Honorable Crosby Jethro, W. H. Crompton as the Duke of Droneborough, Marian Gardiner as Lady Pamela Mallison, Lillian Thurgate as Ottiline Mallison, Guy Standing as the Marquis of Quarmby, George W. Howard as Captain Standige, Ebenezer Y. Backus as Brabason Tudway, Blanche Burton as Mrs. Brabason Tudway, Louise Maltman as Emily Cardew, John R. Sumner as Richard Annesley, George C. Pearce as Montague Denton, Joseph Wheelock, Jr. as Mawley Jemmett, May Robson as Mrs. Vokins, W. H. Workman as Mr. Jeal, Frank Brownlee as Wyke, John Armstrong as Kinch, and George Osborne, Jr. as Swepson. It closed the following May after running for 111 performances.

It was revived on Broadway later in 1899, 1903 and 1917.

== Film adaptation ==
In 1919 the play was turned into an American silent film of the same title directed by Harry Beaumont.

== Sources ==
- Goble, Alan. The Complete Index to Literary Sources in Film. Walter de Gruyter, 1999. ISBN 9783110951943
