= The Enchanted Cottage =

The Enchanted Cottage may refer to:

- The Enchanted Cottage (play), a 1923 play by Arthur Wing Pinero
  - The Enchanted Cottage (1924 film), an adaptation starring Richard Barthelmess and May McAvoy
  - The Enchanted Cottage (1945 film), another adaptation, featuring Dorothy McGuire and Robert Young
