= The Amazons (1917 film) =

American silent comedy film

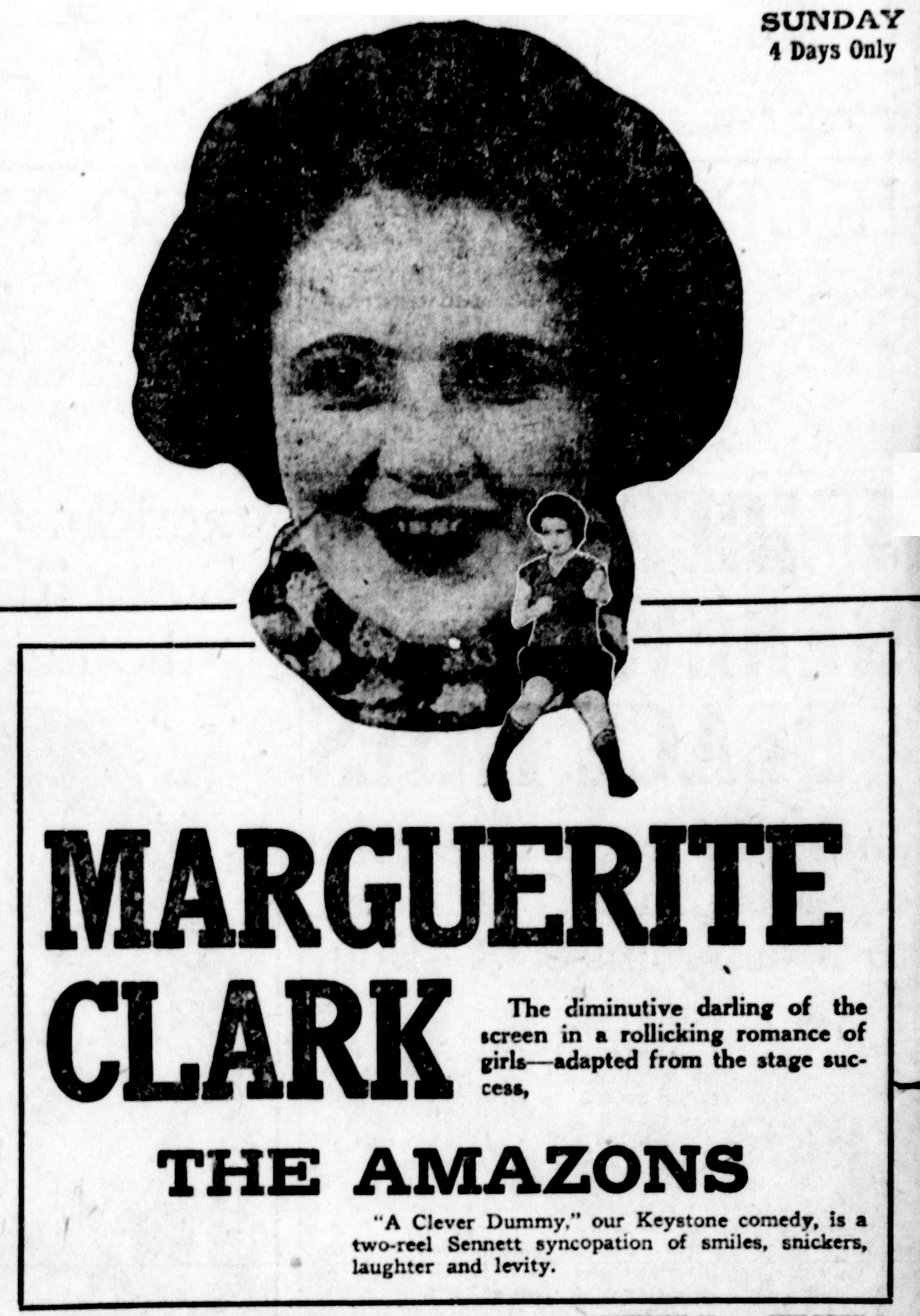
- Newspaper advertisement
- Directed by: Joseph Kaufman
- Written by: Frances Marion
- Based on: The Amazons by Sir Arthur Wing Pinero
- Produced by: Famous Players Film Company
- Starring: Marguerite Clark; Eleanor Lawson; Helen Greene
- Cinematography: William Marshall
- Production company: Famous Players–Lasky
- Distributed by: Paramount Pictures
- Release date: August 5, 1917
- Running time: 5 reels
- Country: United States
- Language: Silent (English intertitles)

The Amazons is a 1917 American silent comedy film directed by Joseph Kaufman and starred Marguerite Clark, Elsie Lawson, and Helen Greene. The film was based on the 1883 play of the same name by Sir Arthur Wing Pinero, and adapted for the screen by Frances Marion. It was produced and distributed by Famous Players–Lasky and distributed by Paramount Pictures under the Famous Players–Lasky name. The film is now presumed lost.

== Plot ==
As described in a film magazine review, because the parents are disappointed that their three children are girls instead of boys, they are brought up as boys by the Marchioness of Castlejordan, and no men are allowed within the walls of the estate. The antics of the three upset the villagers and cause gossip. Tommy, the youngest, is sent to London to visit relatives. She slips away from the house dressed in a gentleman's evening clothes and visits a dance hall. Encountering a bully, in self-defense she knocks him down. Escaping from the hall, she jumps into the cab of Lord Litterly, who takes her home, and a warm friendship springs up between them. Later, the lord is instrumental in saving her from a fall from a runaway horse. Her two sisters arrange a meeting with two men in the gymnasium one evening. Tommy climbs through a skylight and "drops in" on Litterly, who happened to be bringing a message with a maid. The Marchioness discovers the trio, and seeing that her girls will be girls, gives them her blessing, and a triple wedding follows.

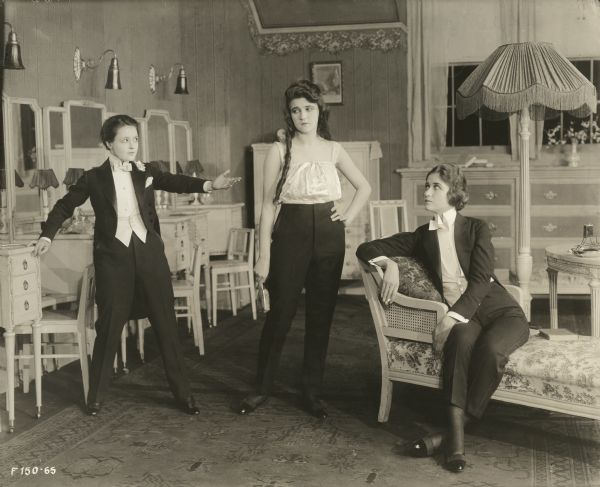
From left: Tommy (Marguerite Clark), Willie (Eleanor Lawson), and Noel (Helen Greene) in a publicity still

== Cast ==
- Marguerite Clark as Lord Tommy
- Elsie Lawson as Willie (*aka Eleanor Lawson)
- Helen Greene as Noel
- William Hinckley as Lord Litterly
- Helen Robinson as Marchioness of Castlejordan
- Edgar Norton as Lord Tweenways
- Andre Bellon as Count de Grival
- Roxanne Lancing as Sgt. Shuter
- Jack Standing as unconfirmed role
