= The Second Mrs Tanqueray =

1893 stage play by Arthur Wing Pinero

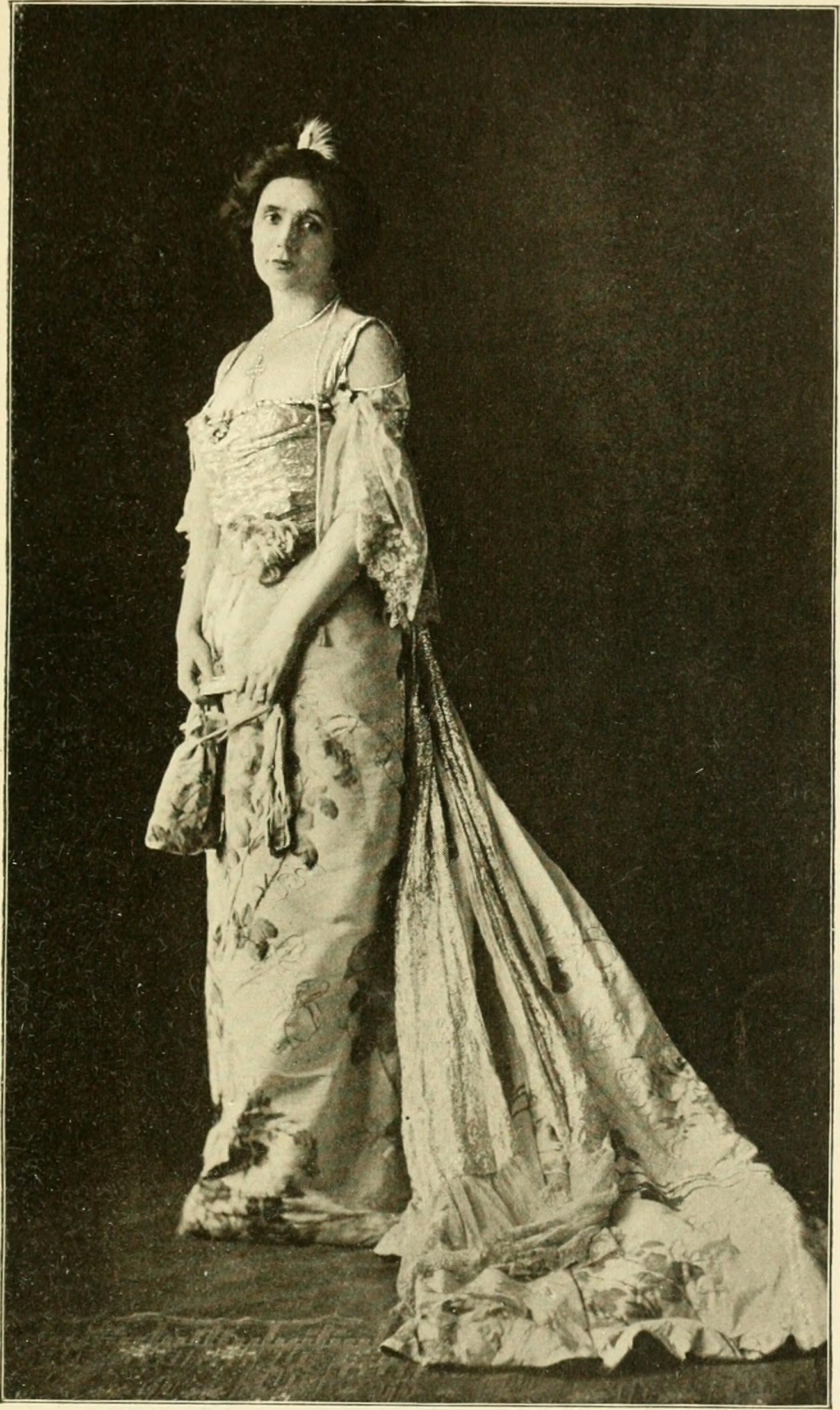
Mrs. Patrick Campbell as Paula Tanqueray in the 1902 Broadway revival

The Second Mrs. Tanqueray is a problem play by Arthur Wing Pinero. It utilises the "Woman with a past" plot, popular in nineteenth century melodrama. The play was first produced in 1893 by the actor-manager George Alexander and despite causing some shock to his audiences by its scandalous subject it was a box-office success, and was revived in London and New York in many productions during the 20th century.

== Background and first performance ==
The English dramatist Arthur Wing Pinero had won fame as a writer of farces and other comedies, including The Magistrate (1885), Dandy Dick (1887) and The Cabinet Minister (1890). Wishing to write about serious subjects, he wrote The Profligate (1889), in which past misdeeds come to haunt a seemingly respectable man. Pinero intended the central character to kill himself at the climax of the play, but the actor-manager John Hare persuaded him to tone down the ending to avoid alienating his respectable society audience.

When his next such drama – The Second Mrs Tanqueray – came to be produced, Pinero remained firm: the play would, and did, end in tragedy. While he was planning it, several plays of Henrik Ibsen were presented in London for the first time, regarded by much of polite society as avant garde, blunt and shocking. (Note: Ibsen's Ghosts, Rosmersholm, The Lady from the Sea and Hedda Gabler were all given in London for the first time during 1891 and 1892, mostly at special matinées.) Seeing Ghosts led Pinero to reconsider his approach to playwriting, which now seemed old-fashioned by comparison. He was far from uncritical of Ibsen's plays, but recognised that if he was to be a serious dramatist he must treat social problems and human misconduct frankly.

The Second Mrs Tanqueray centred on "a woman with a past". Hare thought it too shocking for his audience and declined to present it. George Alexander, the actor-manager running the St James's Theatre, to whom Pinero then offered the play, said, "Sorry, I daren't do it". He had second thoughts, and accepted it. It was presented at the St James's on 27 May 1893. The cast was:

Punch cartoon showing Pinero's relief as the second Mrs Tanqueray (Mrs Patrick Campbell) successfully leaps over a hurdle marked "Convention", followed by George Alexander as Tanqueray

- Aubrey Tanqueray – George Alexander
- Sir George Orreyed, Bart – Adolphus Vane-Tempest
- Captain Hugh Ardale – Ben Webster
- Cayley Drummle – Cyril Maude (later Henry V. Esmond)
- Frank Misquith, QC, MP – Nutcombe Gould (later H. H. Vincent)
- Gordon Jayne, MD – Murray Hathorn
- Morse – Alfred Holles
- Lady Orreyed – Edith Chester
- Mrs Cortelyon – Amy Roselle (later Charlotte Granville)
- Paula – Mrs Patrick Campbell (later Charlotte Granville)
- Ellean – Maude Millett

Source: The Era.

The piece was a box-office success and was still playing to full houses when Alexander, who disliked acting in long runs, closed the production in April 1894.

The play is referenced in Hilaire Belloc's poem, Matilda, in Cautionary Tales for Children.

It happened that a few Weeks later
Her Aunt was off to the Theatre
To see that Interesting Play
The Second Mrs. Tanqueray.
She had refused to take her Niece
To hear this Entertaining Piece:
A Deprivation Just and Wise
To Punish her for Telling Lies.

== Plot ==
The play opens with a late night dinner between the widower Mr Tanqueray and some of his longtime professional friends. All are upper class members of British society, and the friends are disturbed when they learn of the forthcoming second marriage of Tanqueray to a Mrs Paula Jarman, a woman with a "bad reputation".

As the play progresses we see the misery of the mismatched couple and their shared efforts to foster a bond between Tanqueray's young and impeccably proper daughter Ellean and her young unhappy stepmother. This is compromised when Mrs Tanqueray learns the identity of her stepdaughter's fiancé; he is the man who ruined her, years ago. She reveals her knowledge to her husband, who prevents the marriage and alienates his daughter. This spreads and husband and wife, father and daughter, step-parent and child are all angered and alienated. When the daughter learns the reasons behind her disappointment she is struck with pity and makes a speech about trying again with her stepmother, only to go to her and find her dead, evidently by suicide.

== Revivals and adaptations ==
Madge Kendal and her husband W. H. Kendal took the play on tour in Britain, and then to Broadway where self-appointed guardians of morality condemned it, and audiences flocked to see it. There were London revivals in 1895 at the St James's, 1901 at the Royalty Theatre, 1903 at the New Theatre, 1913 at the St James's and 1922 at the Playhouse Theatre. Eleonora Duse appeared in an Italian adaptation in 1905, and the play was given in English in Paris in 1907 at the Théâtre Sarah-Bernhardt. The Internet Broadway Database records New York revivals in 1900, 1902, 1907, 1908, 1913 and 1924. More recently, the play has been revived in the West End with Eileen Herlie in the title role in 1950, and at the National Theatre in 1981, starring Felicity Kendal.

The play was adapted for the cinema in 1916, with Alexander in his original role. A later film version was released in 1952, with Pamela Brown as Paula and Hugh Sinclair as Tanqueray. The BBC has broadcast several radio adaptations of the play, starring Margaret Rawlings and Nicholas Hannen (1940), Coral Browne, Malcolm Keen and Jack Buchanan (1944), Joyce Redman and André Morell (1951), Gladys Cooper and André Morell (1954), Margaret Robertson and Tony Britton (1967) and Michelle Newell and Gary Bond (1992). A BBC television adaptation was broadcast in 1962, starring Elizabeth Sellars and Peter Williams.

== Notes, references and sources ==
=== Sources ===
- Dawick, John (1993). Pinero: A Theatrical Life. Niwot: University of Colorado Press. ISBN 978-0-87081-302-3.
- Gaye, Freda, ed. (1967). Who's Who in the Theatre (fourteenth ed.). London: Sir Isaac Pitman and Sons. OCLC 5997224.
- Morley, Sheridan (1986). The Great Stage Stars. London: Angus & Robertson. ISBN 978-0-8160-1401-9.
- Rowell, George, ed. (1986). Plays by A. W. Pinero: The Schoolmistress, The Second Mrs Tanqueray, Trelawny of the 'Wells', The Thunderbolt. Cambridge University Press.
