= A Slave of Vanity =

1920 film by Henry Otto

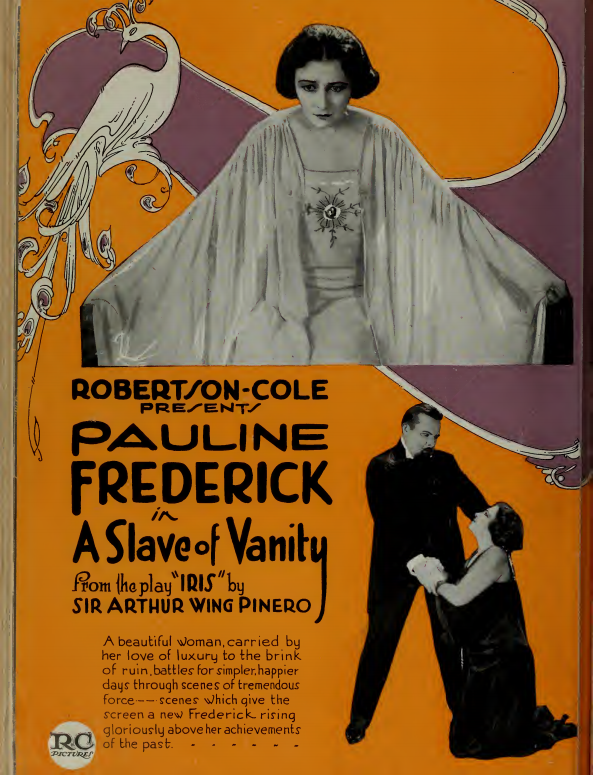
- Advertisement
- Directed by: Henry Otto
- Written by: Henry Otto (scenario)
- Based on: Iris by Arthur Wing Pinero
- Starring: Pauline Frederick; Arthur Hoyt
- Production company: Robertson-Cole Pictures Corporation
- Distributed by: Robertson-Cole Pictures Corporation
- Release date: November 28, 1920
- Running time: 60 minutes
- Country: United States
- Language: Silent (English intertitles)

A Slave of Vanity is a 1920 American silent drama film starring Pauline Frederick, and directed and written by Henry Otto. The film, which was adapted from Arthur Wing Pinero's 1901 play Iris, was produced and distributed by the Robertson-Cole Pictures Corporation that eventually became part of Film Booking Office of America. The film is now considered lost.

== Plot ==
Iris, a British aristocrat, must choose between the poor Laurence and the rich Frederick. She decides to marry the wealthier Frederick, but at the last minute she changes her mind and runs off to Italy with Laurence. However, things do not work out quite the way she planned.

== Cast ==
- Pauline Frederick as Iris Bellamy
- Arthur Hoyt as Croker Harrington
- Nigel Barrie as Laurence Trenwith
- Willard Louis as Frederick Maldonado
- Maude Louis as Fanny Sullivan
- Daisy Jefferson as Aurea Vyse
- Ruth Handforth as Miss Pinsent
- Howard Gaye as Arthur Kane

== See also ==
- List of lost films
