= Edith Chester =

British actress

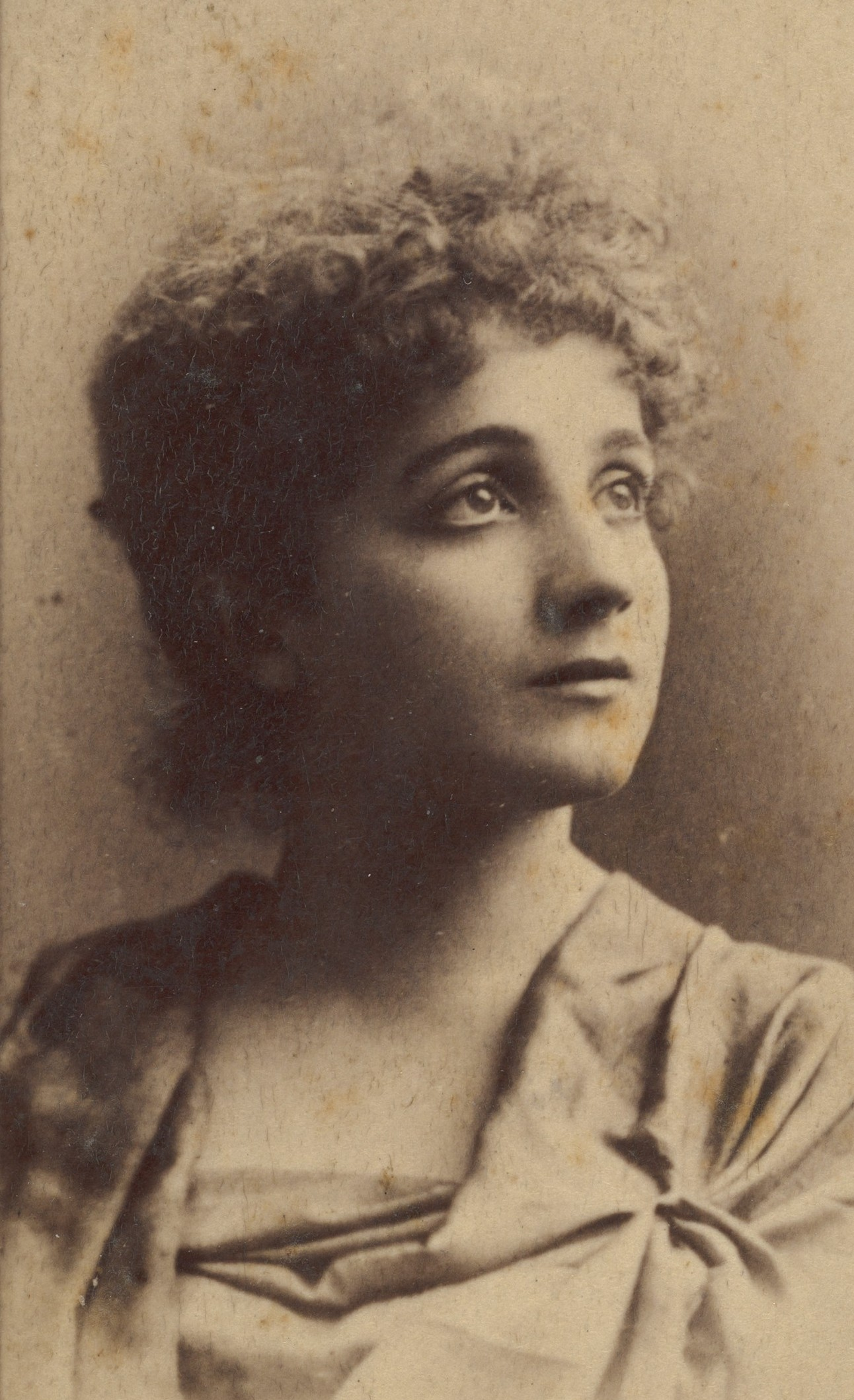
- Portrait (cropped) from an 1880s cigarette card, for the stage name Leslie Chester
- Born: Edith Morgan Gellibrand; 1864
- Died: 1894 (aged 29–30)
- Occupation: actor
- Father: Thomas Samuel Gellibrand

Edith Chester (1864–1894; born Edith Morgan Gellibrand), known also as Leslie Chester, was a British actress.

== Early life ==
Chester was born in Arkhangelsk in March 1864; she was the second daughter of Thomas Samuel Gellibrand (1820/1–1897, born in Madras), a British timber merchant resident in Russia from 1847 to 1865. She came from a family who opposed her wish to go on the stage. Her paternal grandfather was Sheriff of Madras, Thomas Gellibrand (died 1824).

She has been identified as a model for The Golden Stairs, an 1880 painting by Edward Burne-Jones; but some research suggests the face in question is that of Dorothy Dene. Walter Crane in his memoir An Artist's Reminiscences (1907) described a sea pleasure trip of the early 1880s, from Brightlingsea to Torquay, in a party where Chester and Calliope Sechiari, daughter of Aglaia Coronio, were the female guests. Performances in amateur productions in 1883, under her real name with her sister Lina, gained Chester positive press coverage. At the Londesborough Theatre in Scarborough, North Yorkshire, she played Helen Gaythorne in Weak Woman by Henry James Byron, and Lisette in the after-piece The Swiss Cottage by Thomas Haynes Bayly. Appearing in a charity performance at St. George's Hall, London, in Tom Taylor's The Serf, she was pronounced "charming" as Acoulina.

== Actress ==
Chester made her professional stage debut in the USA, in October 1885. She crossed the Atlantic from Liverpool in the SS Adriatic, chaperoned by her mother and accompanied by Agnes Miller, another aspiring actress, in a party with Weedon Grossmith and Brandon Thomas. She again took part in an amateur production at St. George's Hall, in December 1885. A reviewer found her "most bewitching" as Eliza Ravenshaw in Time Will Tell by Herbert Gardner.

In early 1886, she was in New York playing in the professional company of Rosina Vokes as Leslie Chester, with Weedon Grossmith. A review by Alan Dale of A Christmas Pantomime Rehearsal commented that "Miss Leslie Chester is so pretty that her dramatic sins can be magnanimously pardoned." She portrayed Lettice Vane in Henry Hamilton's Harvest at the Princess's Theatre, London in September that year. She created that role, as well as Nan in William Leonard Courtney's Kit Marlowe. In 1887 she played Lydia Hawthorne during the original long run of Dorothy at the Prince of Wales's Theatre.

Chester created the part of Lady Orreyed in The Second Mrs Tanqueray by Arthur Pinero, first performed in 1893.

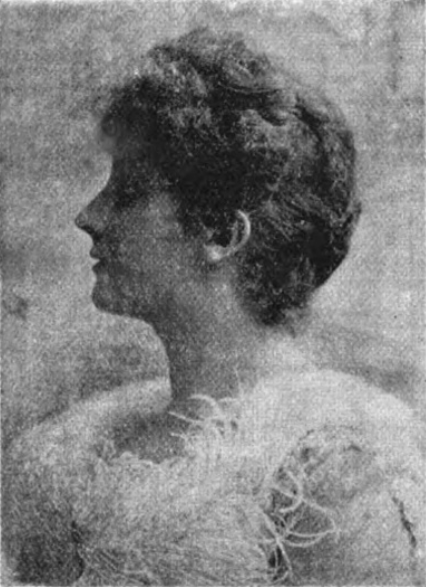
Edith Chester, 1889 photograph

== Death ==
Chester (her married name by that time was Edith Earl) died of typhoid fever in Brighton, on 10 November 1894. She had recently appeared as Mrs Pattleton, in Hot Water by Henry Brougham Farnie, an adaptation of La Boule by Henri Meilhac and Ludovic Halévy, at the Criterion Theatre.

== Family ==
Chester was twice married.

- Firstly, in 1887, to Frank Hallowell Carew, son of Benjamin Hallowell Carew of Beddington. Chester was granted a decree absolute ending this marriage on 30 November 1893.
- Secondly, on 12 January 1894, to Loftus Earl.
