= The Amazons (play) =

Play written by Arthur Wing Pinero

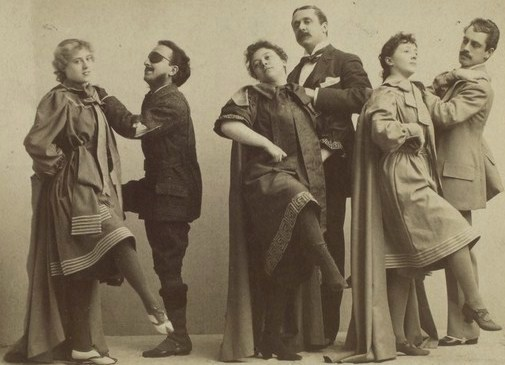
A publicity photo featuring (left to right) Katherine Florence, Ferdinand Gottschalk, Georgia Cayvan, Herbert Kelcey, Bessie Tyree, and Fritz Williams, around 1894

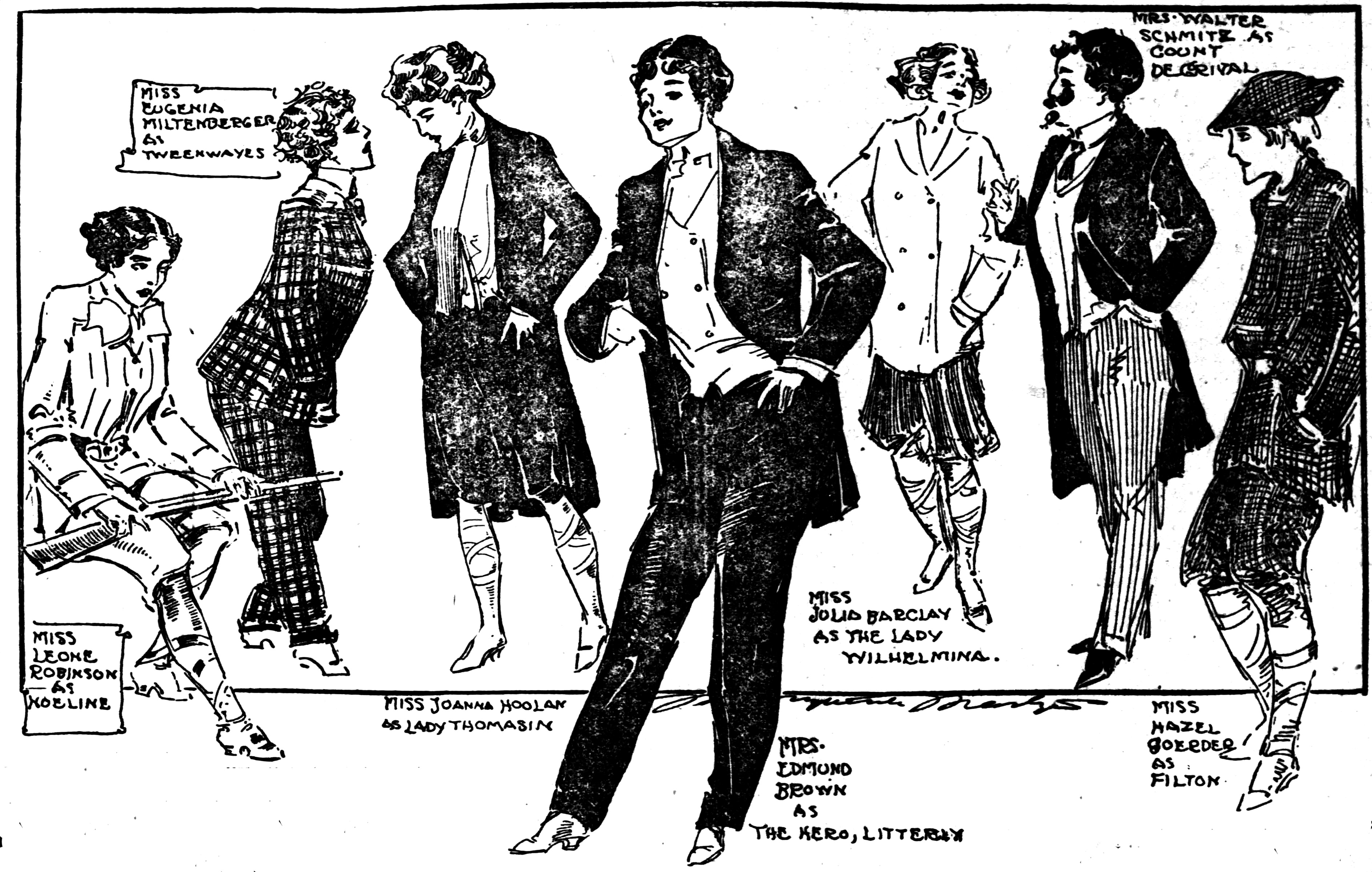
In this sketch by Marguerite Martyn, the College Club of St. Louis was in rehearsal for “The Amazons,” a play by Arthur Wing Pinero, in which all the parts were played by women, April 1910.

The Amazons: A Farcical Romance is an 1893 play by Arthur Wing Pinero.

The play subsequently opened the Royal Court Theatre on 7 March 1893 and ran for 111 performances until 8 July 1893. It subsequently opened at the Lyceum Theatre on 19 February 1894.

The plot involves three sisters (Noeline/Noel, Wilhelmina/Willis, and Thomasin/Tommie) raised by their aristocratic father as his male heirs. They have trouble adjusting to society.

The play was revived (again with Billie Burke) and opened at the Empire Theatre on 28 April 1913. The revival included the song "My Otaheitee lady" with music by Jerome Kern, using lyrics by the deceased Charles H. Taylor.

In 1917 it was adapted as a film of the same name.

== Broadway cast ==
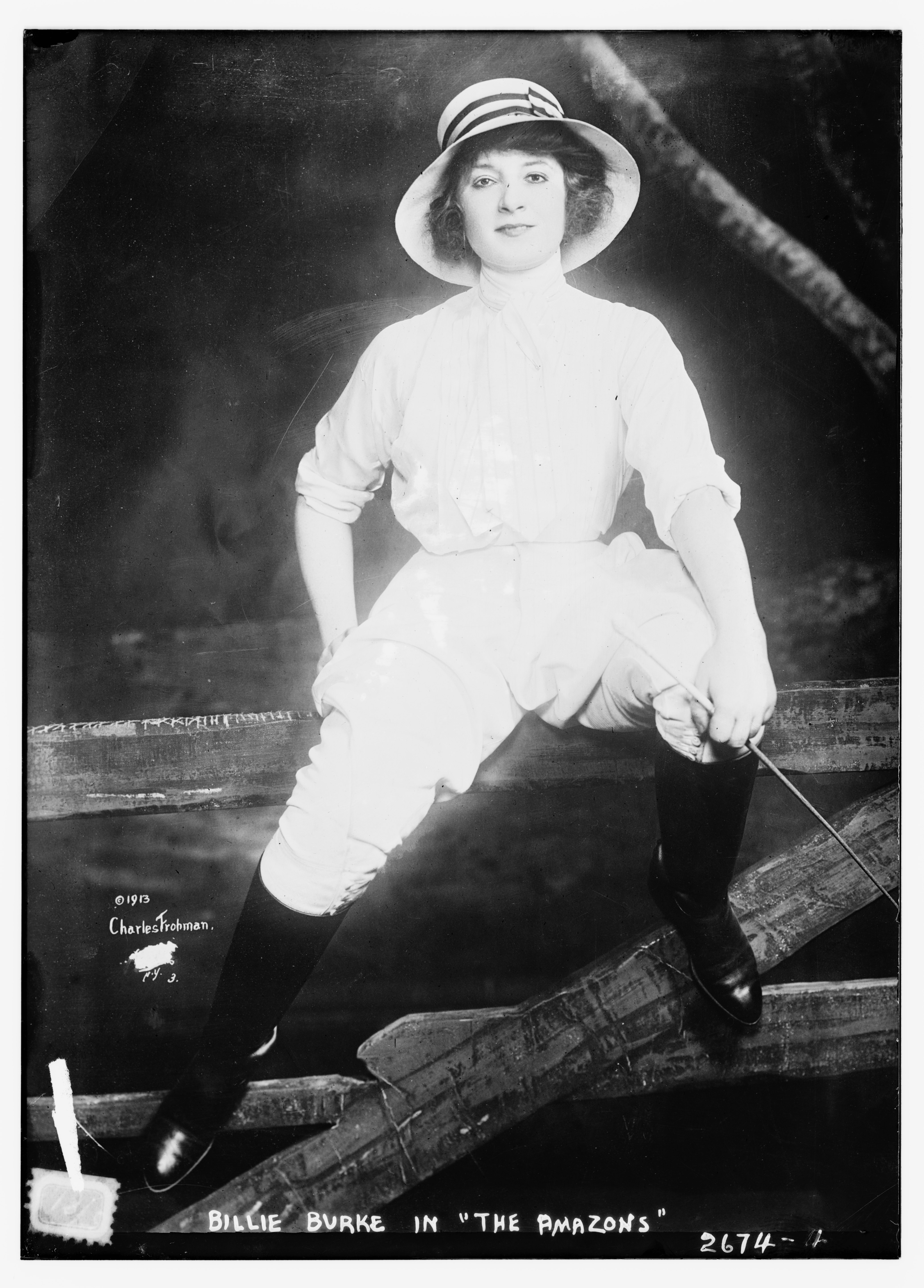
Billie Burke in The Amazons (1913)

- Lorena Atwood as "Sergeant" Shutter
- Barrett Barker as Orts
- Billie Burke as Lady Thomasin
- Miriam Clements as Lady Noeline
- Annie Esmond as Miriam
- Arthur Fitzgerald as Youatt
- Ferdinand Gottschalk as Galfred
- Shelly Hull as Barrington
- Dorothy Lane as Lady Wilhelmina
- Thomas Reynolds as Fitton
- Morton Selten as Rev. Minchin
- Fritz Williams as Andre
