= Laura Lyttelton =

English Pre-Raphaelite model (1862–1886)

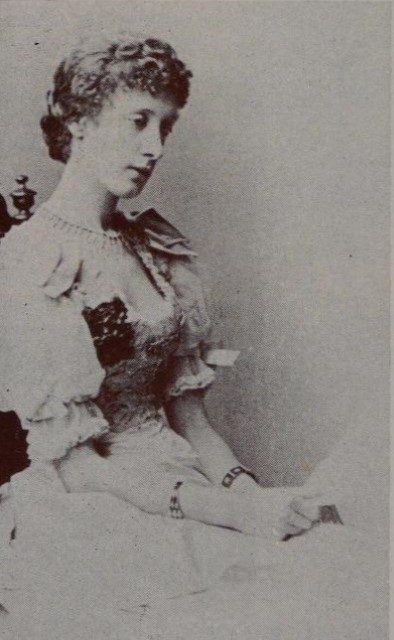
- Born: Octavia Laura Tennant; 1862
- Died: 24 April 1886 (aged 23–24)
- Spouse: Alfred Lyttelton (m. May 1885)
- Parent(s): Charles Tennant; Emma Winsloe

Laura Lyttelton (née Tennant, 1862–1886) was a British society figure who appeared in two paintings by Pre-Raphaelite painter Edward Burne-Jones and fascinated London society, marrying politician Alfred Lyttelton, before her early death in childbirth at the age of 24. After her death, her connections formed the social and intellectual group The Souls.

== Life ==
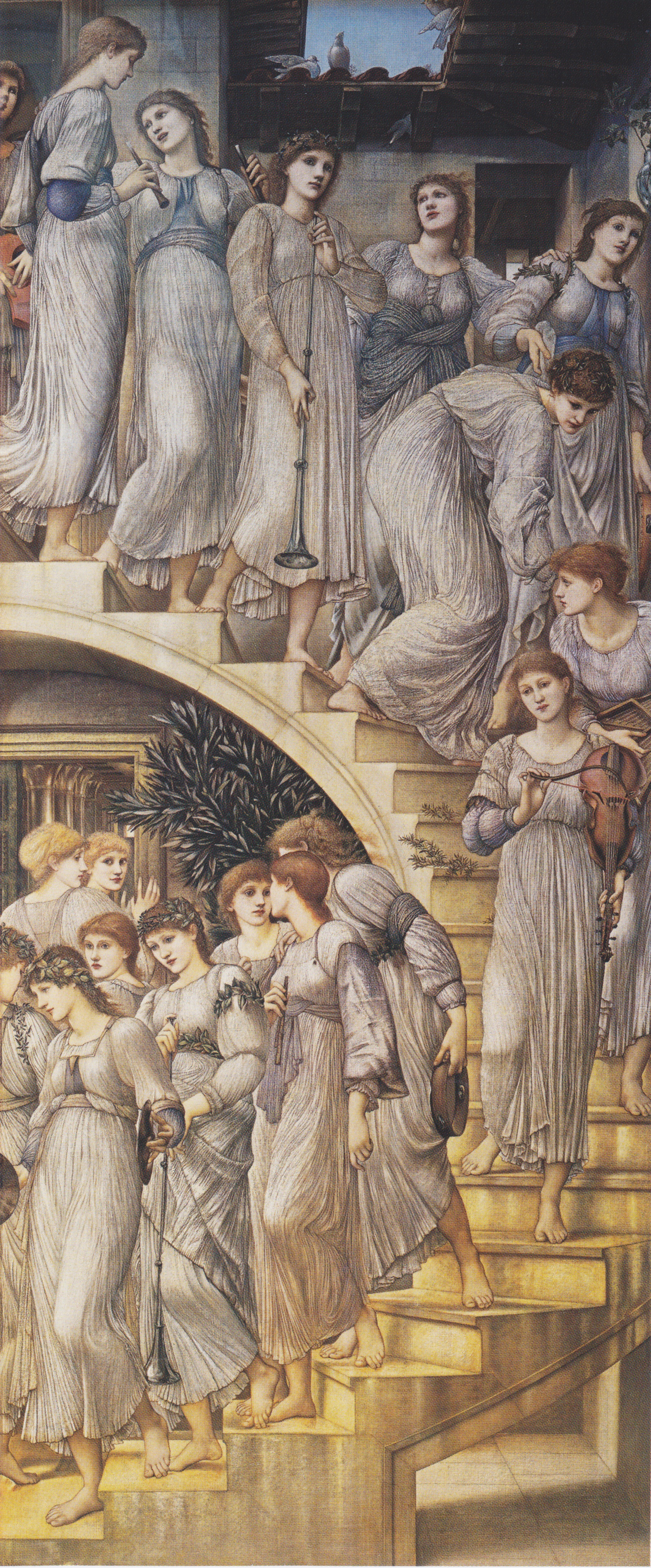
Laura Lyttelton is thought to be one of the models for The Golden Stairs by Edward Burne-Jones.

She was born Octavia Laura Tennant in 1862, the sixth of eight children of industrialist Charles Tennant and his wife Emma, née Winsloe. She grew up at their family estate, The Glen, Peeblesshire, where she and her sisters entertained her father’s many guests in what Mary Gladstone called 'the maddest, merriest whirl from morn til night,' discussing literature with their guests until the early hours of the morning.

In 1881, her father took on a London house in Grosvenor Square, where Laura and her sister Margot were encouraged to surround themselves with guests. Lady Frances Balfour said of them, 'It was unnatural if every man did not propose to them after a few hours’ acquaintance.' Lawyer Adolphus G. C. Liddell and Gerald Balfour were among those who hoped to marry Laura.

Laura made an impression in London with her witty and irreverent personality. Alfred, Lord Tennyson, whom she met on a cruise, called her 'little witch'. Liddell described her as 'indescribable...half-child, half-kelpie... she combined the gaiety of a child with the tact and aplomb of a grown woman.' Mary Gladstone said of her:

'She had the naughtiness, the grace and quickness and mischievousness of a kitten...Nothing was safe in heaven or earth or under the earth from the sallies of her wit. One trembles to think what she would have been had it not been for the restraining influence of her spiritual side.'

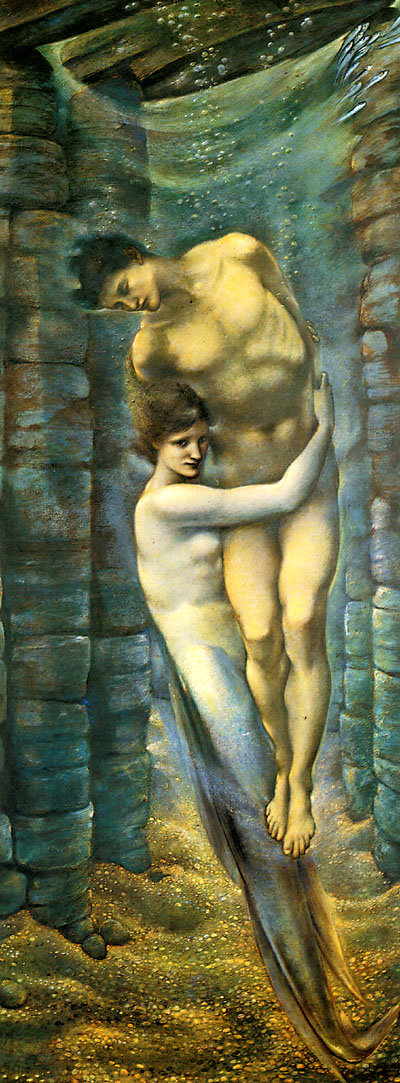
Burne-Jones' mermaid in The Depths of the Sea (1886) captured Laura's 'strange charm of expression' (Burne-Jones (1906), p. 166)

Edward Burne-Jones, whose household called Laura 'the Siren,' made several sketches of her and is thought to have used her as a model in his Golden Stairs. When he began working on The Depths of the Sea in 1886, he said that he was 'painting a scene in Laura's previous existence.'

Alfred Lyttelton, a frequent visitor to the Glen, proposed to her and was accepted during a New Year party at the Glen on 3 January 1885, and they were married in May 1885.

== Death and legacy ==
During her first pregnancy, Laura became increasingly convinced that she would not survive the childbirth, and wrote an affectionate informal will to be read out at her death. She died eight days after the childbirth on 24 April 1886, possibly already suffering from tuberculosis; the baby died in 1888.

Burne-Jones painted a memorial plaque to her.

After her death, her friends coalesced into a group centred around her husband and sisters which became known as ‘the Gang’ by 1887, changing its name to ‘the Souls’ by 1889. Margot, Alfred Lyttelton, and his second wife Edith, née Balfour, were among its members.

== In popular culture ==
Laura Lyttelton was portrayed by Kate Phillips in the 2020 Netflix mini-series The English Game.
