= Iris (1916 film) =

- Directed by: Cecil M. Hepworth
- Written by: Arthur Wing Pinero (play)
- Produced by: Cecil M. Hepworth
- Starring: Henry Ainley; Alma Taylor; Stewart Rome
- Production company: Hepworth Pictures
- Distributed by: Ideal Film Company
- Release date: November 1915
- Running time: 6 reels
- Country: United Kingdom
- Languages: Silent; English intertitles

Iris is a 1916 British silent romance film directed by Cecil M. Hepworth and starring Henry Ainley, Alma Taylor and Stewart Rome. It is based on the 1901 play Iris by Arthur Wing Pinero.

== Cast ==
- Henry Ainley as Maldonado
- Alma Taylor as Iris
- Stewart Rome as Lawrence Trenwith
- Violet Hopson

== Reception ==
Similar to American films of the time, Iris was submitted for review and was subject to cuts by American city and state film censorship boards. The Chicago Board of Censors issued an Adults Only permit for the British film.

== Bibliography ==
- Goble, Alan. The Complete Index to Literary Sources in Film. Walter de Gruyter, 1999.
