= The Golden Stairs =

Painting by Edward Burne-Jones

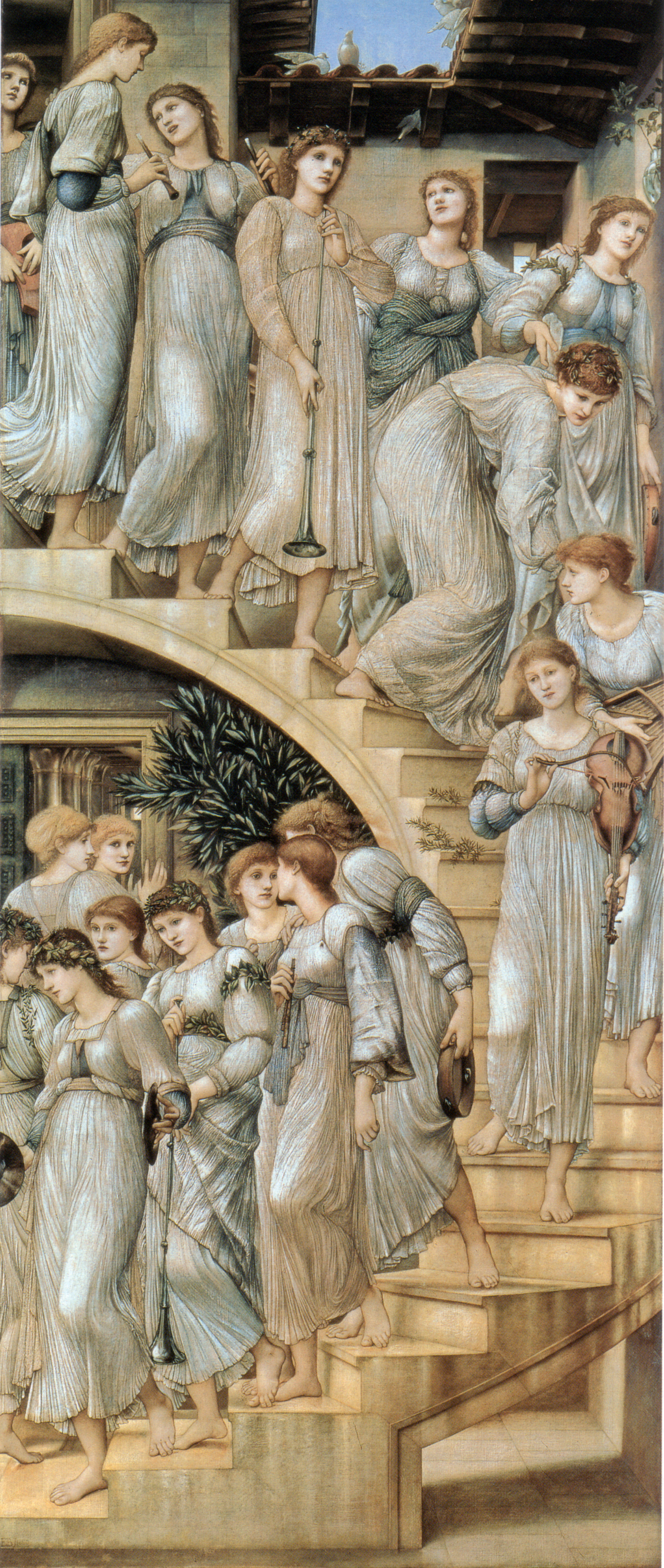
- Artist: Edward Burne-Jones
- Year: 1880
- Medium: Oil on panel
- Dimensions: 269.2 cm × 116.8 cm (106.0 in × 46.0 in)
- Location: Tate Britain, London

The Golden Stairs is one of the best-known paintings by the Pre-Raphaelite artist Edward Burne-Jones. It was begun in 1876 and was exhibited at the Grosvenor Gallery in 1880.

Unlike many of Burne-Jones's works, The Golden Stairs is not based on a literary source. It has been called Symbolist, as it has no recognisable narrative, but rather sets a mood. It is a harmony of color in the tradition of the Aesthetic works of the 1860s and 1870s, as a group of young women carrying musical instruments descend a spiraling staircase, dressed in classically inspired robes in tones of white, shading to gold and silver. Critic F. G. Stephens wrote in The Athenaeum that the musicians "troop past like spirits in an enchanted dream ... whither they go, who they are, there is nothing to tell".

The Golden Stairs was one of many paintings Burne-Jones sketched out in 1872 following a trip to Italy. He began work on the canvas in 1876 and finished it in great haste in April 1880, just days before the Grosvenor Gallery exhibition was to open. Stephens found in the painting, echoes of the work of Piero della Francesca, whose frescoes Burne-Jones had seen and copied in 1871. The figures of the musicians were drawn from professional models, but the heads are young women of Burne-Jones's circle. Some identifications have been made as follows.

His daughter Margaret is fourth from top, holding a trumpet. Edith Gellibrand, known also by the stage name Edith Chester, has been considered as the model for seventh from top, seen stooping. May Morris, daughter of William Morris, is ninth from top, holding a violin. Frances Graham, later known as Lady Horner, daughter of William Graham, is bottom left, holding cymbals. Standing behind her on the stairs is Mary Gladstone, daughter of William Gladstone. Others include Laura Tennant, later known as Laura Lyttelton, and Mary Stuart-Wortley, later Lady Lovelace.

The central portion of the staircase is an error in foreshortening inasmuch as three of the "steps" appear to be vertical drops without anywhere to place one's feet.

The painting was purchased by Cyril Flower (1843–1907), later Lord Battersea, a politician and art patron, and was bequeathed by him to the Tate Gallery, where it remains.

== Studies ==
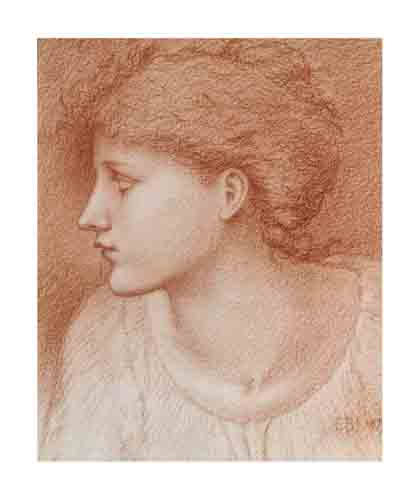
Study of the head of a girl, 1879

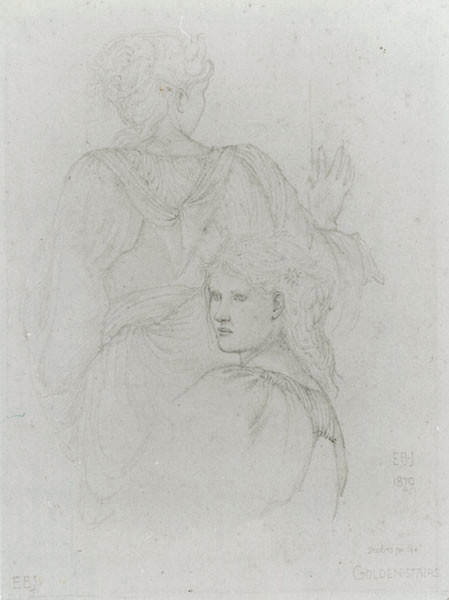
Study of two girls

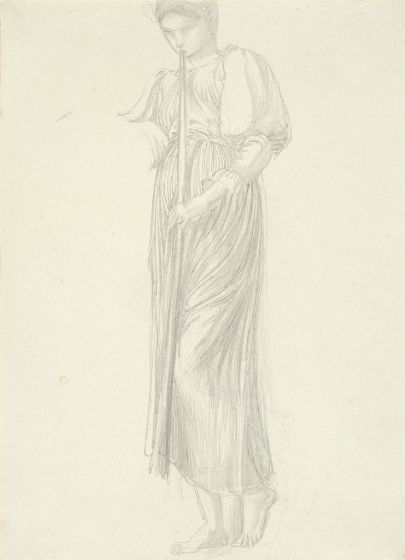
Study of a musician

== See also ==
- List of paintings by Edward Burne-Jones
- Tate Britain's listing
