= The Enchanted Cottage (1945 film) =

1945 film by John Cromwell

- Theatrical poster
- Directed by: John Cromwell
- Screenplay by: DeWitt Bodeen; Herman J. Mankiewicz
- Based on: The Enchanted Cottage; 1923 play by Arthur Wing Pinero
- Produced by: Harriet Parsons
- Starring: Robert Young; Dorothy McGuire
- Narrated by: Herbert Marshall
- Cinematography: Ted Tetzlaff
- Edited by: Joseph Noriega
- Music by: Roy Webb
- Distributed by: RKO Radio Pictures
- Release date: April 28, 1945
- Running time: 91 minutes
- Country: United States
- Language: English

The Enchanted Cottage is a 1945 American supernatural romance film starring Dorothy McGuire, Robert Young, and Herbert Marshall, with Mildred Natwick.

It was based on the 1923 play by Arthur Wing Pinero. The Enchanted Cottage was first adapted for the silent screen in 1924, with Richard Barthelmess and May McAvoy as the newlyweds. A third adaptation appeared in 2016.

== Plot ==
At a party, guests are waiting for the married couple Laura and Oliver Bradford to arrive. John Hillgrove, a blind pianist, proceeds to perform his tone poem titled "The Enchanted Cottage," which he wrote in their honor.

Laura Pennington cycles to a seaside New England cottage where she meets Hillgrove and his young nephew Danny. Laura had heard fantastical stories about the cottage from her mother before her death. Feeling ostracized for her homely appearance, Laura is hired as a caretaker by Mrs. Abigail Minnett, a widowed tenant owner. Mrs. Minnett feels a mutual connection with Laura after losing her husband during World War I.

Oliver Bradford, a soon to be called up Army Air Forces pilot, arrives, having rented the cottage with his new fiancée, Beatrice Alexander. Beatrice, however, is displeased with the cottage decor. Laura reassures Beatrice that the cottage is magical, showing her the window where couples have written their names.

Later that night, a honeymoon party is planned for the engaged couple, but Oliver sends a letter stating he will be unable to arrive. He has been called back into military service before his wedding. Beatrice subsequently cancels their leasing agreement. One year later, a telegram arrives stating Oliver's intention to rent the cottage indefinitely. Oliver arrives, hiding his face inside his trench coat, and locks himself in his room. During a stormy night, Laura enters his room where Oliver reveals his disfigurement from the war. His face is scarred, and his right arm and hand are disabled from his plane being shot down in the Battle of Java.

The next morning, Laura develops a connection with Oliver in the garden. Hillgrove arrives and converses with Oliver, stating that when he became blind, he developed a new lease on life by appreciating music. By nighttime, Oliver receives a letter from his mother, Mrs. Price, but he refuses to see her and his stepfather because of how he looks with his war injuries. Laura finds Oliver by the seashore. In an attempt to keep distance from his mother, Oliver proposes to Laura, and she accepts.

After their honeymoon, Laura and Oliver return to the cottage, both feeling transformed. A flashback to before their wedding dinner is shown in which the couple initially reflect on their sham marriage. Laura tries to declare her love for Oliver but is unable to do so. She runs to her bedroom in tears, but Oliver comforts her. He realizes his genuine love for Laura, seeing her as a beautiful, glamorous woman. Laura in return sees Oliver as handsome and unscarred.

At the cottage, Oliver's mother and stepfather arrive, and Hillgrove unsuccessfully attempts to explain to them Oliver and Laura's "transformations". However, Mrs. Price mentions to Laura that she is grateful her son married her because Laura has more to offer him than a pretty girl would. That comment breaks the spell of Laura and Oliver's mutual illusion, and the two of them are "transformed" back to their former selves. They now see each other the way that others do, dowdy and disfigured. The couple turns to Mrs. Minnett, who gives them her validation of their love, telling them that her beloved late husband made her feel beautiful, because that's how people who are truly in love see each other—and that's the real enchantment of the cottage. Mrs. Minnett then leaves the room. Oliver and Laura hold hands, then proceed to write their names on the window. Back to the present, the couple arrives at the front door, where they happily embrace and kiss each other as their idealized selves before entering the house.

== Cast ==
- Dorothy McGuire as Laura Pennington
- Robert Young as Oliver Bradford
- Herbert Marshall as Major John Hillgrove
- Mildred Natwick as Mrs. Abigail Minnett
- Spring Byington as Violet Price, Oliver's mother
- Hillary Brooke as Beatrice Alexander
- Richard Gaines as Frederick 'Freddy' Price, Oliver's stepfather
- Alec Englander as Danny 'Taxi' Stanton, Hillgrove's nephew
- Robert Clarke as Marine Corporal
- Eden Nicholas as Soldier
- Mary Worth as Mrs. Harriet Stanton, Hillgrove's sister (uncredited)
- Josephine Whittell as the Canteen hostess (uncredited)

== The Play ==
Arthur Wing Pinero's play, written in 1921 and first performed in 1922, was filmed in 1924 as a timely story involving physical and emotional disabilities following the First World War. In the stage directions, Oliver is described as an emaciated wreck of a man, broken by the war. The dialogue reveals that he was wounded in the neck and that it is painful to straighten his left leg, but he says his “head,” meaning his mind, is the worst. In the 1924 film, his body is contorted, he walks with a cane, and he cannot put his right foot to the ground. In the 1945 film, most of Oliver's face is scarred, and he has completely lost the use of his right arm and hand. He can walk without aids and there is no visible impairment of his lower body.

The original play and film were set in England, and the history of the “honeymoon” couples extended back into the Tudor period. The “shadows” of three of the historical couples appeared onstage. Elaborate fantasy sequences, representing Laura's dreams and fears, played key roles in the story. They were eliminated from the 1945 version.

In the play, Mrs. Minnett's uncanny gifts are made more explicit: She comes from a long line of witches (witches can be good, Laura hastens to say). She is more damaged by her grief. The cast of the play is larger, including the local rector and his wife, and the couple's blind friend, Major Hillgrove, believes in the transformation, unlike the character portrayed by Herbert Marshall.

== Production ==
=== The Producer ===
RKO Producer Harriet Parsons acquired the rights for her studio for an updated World War II version set in New England. When RKO management took the film away from her and gave it to producer-writer Dudley Nichols, Hollywood columnist Hedda Hopper wrote a strongly worded newspaper editorial criticizing RKO for gender bias. The outcry from the column led RKO to change its plan and give the property back to Harriet Parsons.

Parsons wrote an outline of the updated story about a World War II veteran. She engaged DeWitt Bodeen for the screenplay, and the two became lifelong friends. Parsons also selected John Cromwell as director. David O. Selznick lent RKO Dorothy McGuire for the film, and MGM lent Robert Young, who re-teamed with McGuire after her debut in Claudia.

Parsons contributed to the screenplay along with Herman J. Mankiewicz, who was hired by Cromwell to touch up Bodeen's screenplay.

=== Cast ===
According to Jeremy Arnold of TCM, Robert Young told Leonard Maltin in a 1986 interview that he considered The Enchanted Cottage to be "the best love story that's ever been written. [It] was one of those films I hated to see end. I wanted it to go on and on and on. It was such a joy to do." Young later named a home he built in California “The Enchanted Cottage.”

Dorothy McGuire insisted for her character to show her plainness with no makeup, ill-fitting clothes and a drab hairstyle. When McGuire was filmed looking appealing to Robert Young, her character had similar costumes that were well tailored.

Herbert Marshall, who had lost a leg in World War I, played his role as a blind man with the help of special contact lenses.

=== Soundtrack ===
Composer Roy Webb wrote a piano concerto for the film that a blinded World War I veteran (Herbert Marshall) uses as a tone poem to describe the story of the two protagonists to a gathering of their friends. Webb was nominated for an Academy Award for Best Original Score in 1945 and performed the concerto at the Hollywood Bowl later that year.

== Reception ==
The film was released in April 1945. Not all the critics were enthusiastic. Writing for The New York Times, critic Bosley Crowther observed

[The play and first film] concerned the illusion of beauty and the moral courage which was mutually found by a homely girl and a maimed war veteran when they viewed each other through the eyes of love. It is a theme which is quite as appealing today as it was back then and one which can bear repeating in modern and practical detail. However, the current film version of the wistful drama... contemporizes the subject in peculiarly obsolete terms. Despite all the marvelous advances in plastic surgery, it assumes that a shattered Air Force pilot would be returned to society with a face very badly disfigured and frightening to behold. It forgets that a casualty quite as bitter as the American hero in this case would be studiously rehabilitated through modern treatment before being dismissed. And it violates an obvious tenet of feminine beauty culture today—which is that a girl of moderate features (and fair intelligence) can make herself look very sweet. [T]he deep and studied poignance of this elaborately heart-torturing film appears not only unreasonable but very plainly contrived. It is hard to believe that a depressed veteran's entire recuperation would be allowed to devolve upon a fustrated [sic] girl, an intuitive blind man and a honeymoon cottage possessing charm. And it is fair to insist that no young lady with a face and figure such as that of Dorothy McGuire would permit herself to look so dingy and woebegone as she does in this film.

A review in Variety on December 31, 1944 stated: “Sensitive love story of a returned war veteran with ugly facial disfigurements, and the homely slavey—both self-conscious of their handicaps—is sincerely told both in the script [based on the play by Arthur Wing Pinero] and outstanding direction of John Cromwell.” In The Nation in 1945, critic James Agee stated, "I can recommend the new Robert Young-Dorothy McGuire version to susceptible adolescents of any age, but I doubt that I can give it ... a fair review, for everything about it embarrasses me too painfully for clear thought: its solemnly whimsical good intentions, its slushy philosophy and still slushier dramaturgy, the little kernels of truth which it turns into so much molasses-dipped popcorn ... "

In 2018, Jeremy Arnold wrote for Turner Classic Movies that

The Enchanted Cottage is a movie with its heart in the right place. Anyone who has ever been in love can relate to the sensation that one's partner becomes more beautiful as one's love deepens. The Enchanted Cottage illustrates this phenomenon to full and lovely effect, with its allegorical yet delicate story of the power of love to physically transform a couple.

On Rotten Tomatoes the film holds a rating of 86% among critics and 83% among viewers.

=== Box office ===
The film made a profit of $881,000.

== Adaptations to other media ==
The Enchanted Cottage was adapted as a radio play on the September 3, 1945 broadcast of Lux Radio Theater with Robert Young and Dorothy McGuire reprising their movie roles, and on the December 11, 1946 broadcast of Academy Award Theater, starring Peter Lawford and Joan Lorring.

On May 19, 1949, the play was presented on the Hallmark Playhouse, starring Richard Widmark.

It was broadcast live on the General Electric Theater radio program on September 24, 1953. Joan Fontaine had the starring role.

The film forms the basis of one of the films that Manuel Puig used to compose his novel Kiss of the Spider Woman. The movie is the basis of chapter 5 in which Molina tells a film to himself, one in which he imagines the advantages of lovers' bodies being adapted to the "true love" of their souls, a reality that would make possible supposedly impossible romantic possibilities for himself and his married love interest, Gabriel.

On her variety show, Carol Burnett performed a parody of the film titled "The Enchanted Hovel," with herself in Dorothy McGuire's role and Dick Van Dyke in Robert Young's role.

== See also ==
- Gothic romance film
