= The Enchanted Cottage (1924 film) =

1924 film by John S. Robertson

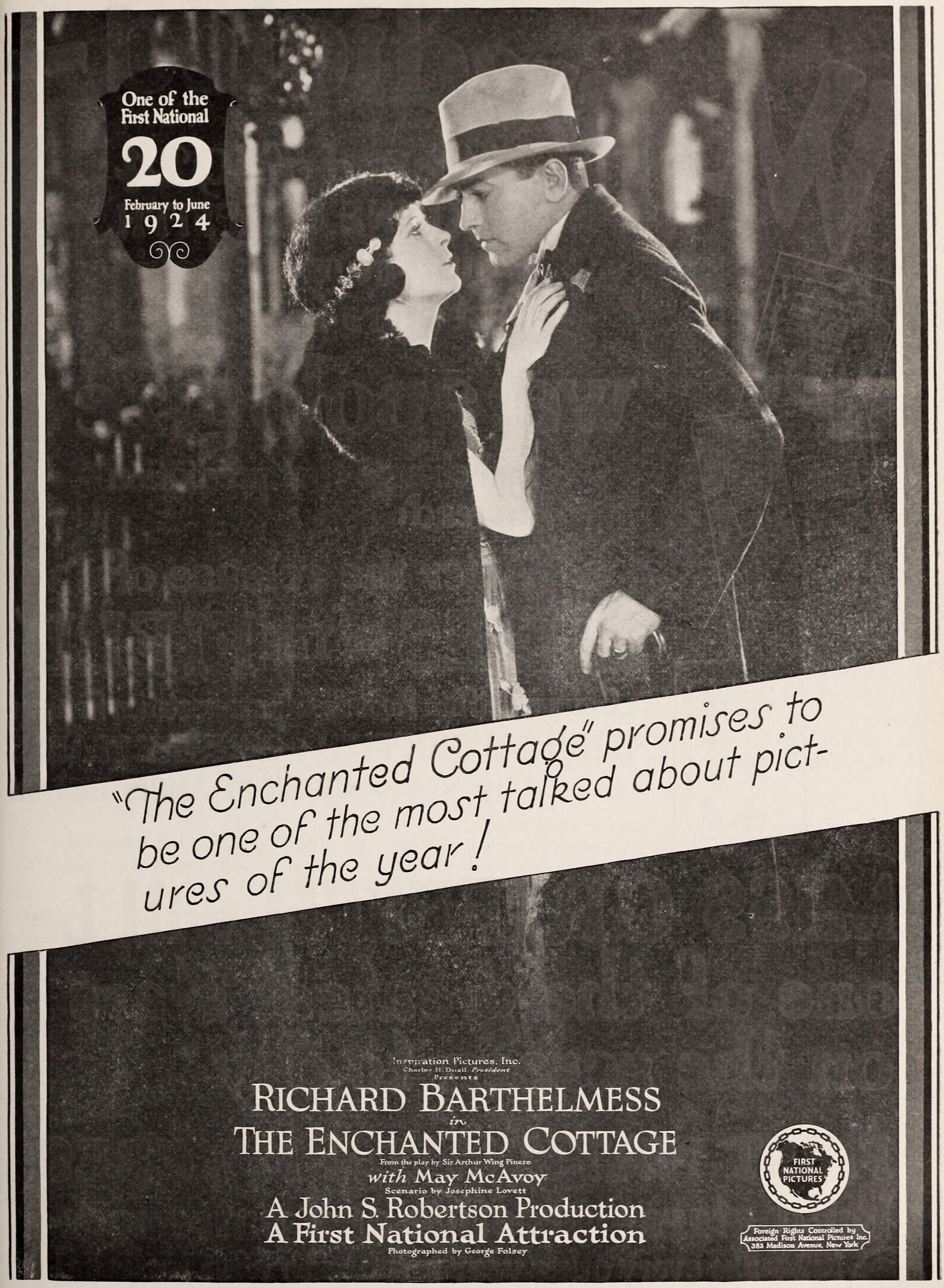
- Contemporary advertisement
- Directed by: John S. Robertson
- Written by: Josephine Lovett (scenario); Gertrude Chase (intertitles)
- Based on: The Enchanted Cottage; 1923 play by Arthur Wing Pinero
- Produced by: John S. Robertson
- Starring: Richard Barthelmess; May McAvoy
- Cinematography: George J. Folsey
- Edited by: William Hamilton
- Production company: Inspiration Pictures Inc.
- Distributed by: Associated First National
- Release date: March 24, 1924
- Running time: 71 minutes
- Country: United States
- Language: Silent (English intertitles)

The Enchanted Cottage is a 1924 American silent drama film directed by John S. Robertson based upon a 1923 play by Arthur Wing Pinero. The film was produced by Richard Barthelmess, through his company Inspiration, and released through Associated First National. Barthelmess and May McAvoy star in the drama, which shows how two lonely people—a young man mutilated in war and a plain young woman—experience the transforming power of love.

Robert Young and Dorothy McGuire starred in a 1945 version, also based on the 1923 play.

== Plot ==
Oliver Bashforth, a war pilot, returns home after serving in World War I. His body is distorted, his face gaunt in pain, and he uses a cane to support the right side. He remains isolated from his mother, stepfather and his sister Ethel, preferring to stay inside darkened rooms. His fiancée Beatrice loves another man but feels obliged to marry Oliver. Oliver finds out and wishes them well. He soon confronts his reflection and decides to leave. He travels alone until he finds a cottage operated by Mrs. Minnett, the housekeeper, that was once part of the Dower house. Laura Pennington, a plain, dependable governess who accompanies herself with children, and Major Hillgrove, another war veteran, hang out in the garden.

While Oliver suffers from a headache, Laura enters into the honeymoon suite. Laura apologizes to him not knowing it was being occupied. She also explains the cottage has been lent to newlyweds for centuries, and offers to introduce him to the other residents. Oliver refuses and then apologizes, while Laura leaves to find a remedy for his headache. Ethel arrives at the cottage having been searching for him. She and Oliver have an argument, but she promises to return.

Shortly after, Laura returns from the pharmacy and hands Oliver the medicine. Laura converses with him about loneliness, in which Oliver relates. Moved by her compassion, Oliver proposes for Laura to marry him, for the companionship. Days later, Oliver mails a letter to his parents announcing his marriage to Laura, causing an uproar. On their wedding night, Oliver and Laura have dinner near a window where newlywed couples have carved their names. Meanwhile, the spirits of newlywed couples become visible as they relive their time in the cottage.

After sitting near a fireplace, Laura goes upstairs, weeping. She then sees the spirits of newlywed brides who sit beside her. Oliver goes upstairs, in which the couple are miraculously transformed. Oliver stands upright while Laura becomes beautiful. The couple conceals themselves from everyone except Major Hillgrove. Oliver sends for his family and asks Hillgrove to greet them, explain their transformation, and then sound the gong. Mrs. Minnett is worried, but she lets the family in and introduces the Major. Ethel rings the gong, and the newlywed couple descend the stairs—unchanged. Ethel declares they are mad, and the family leaves.

Hillgrove delicately feels Laura's face, confirming the truth. Laura weepingly flees to the bedroom, prays for enough beauty to keep Oliver's love, and falls asleep on the fourposter. Oliver then sits on the chaise longue at its foot. The bedroom becomes enchanted with a bower of flowers and silk. In the morning, they awaken into their beautiful appearances, and contemplate their children will be beautiful and blessed.

== Cast ==
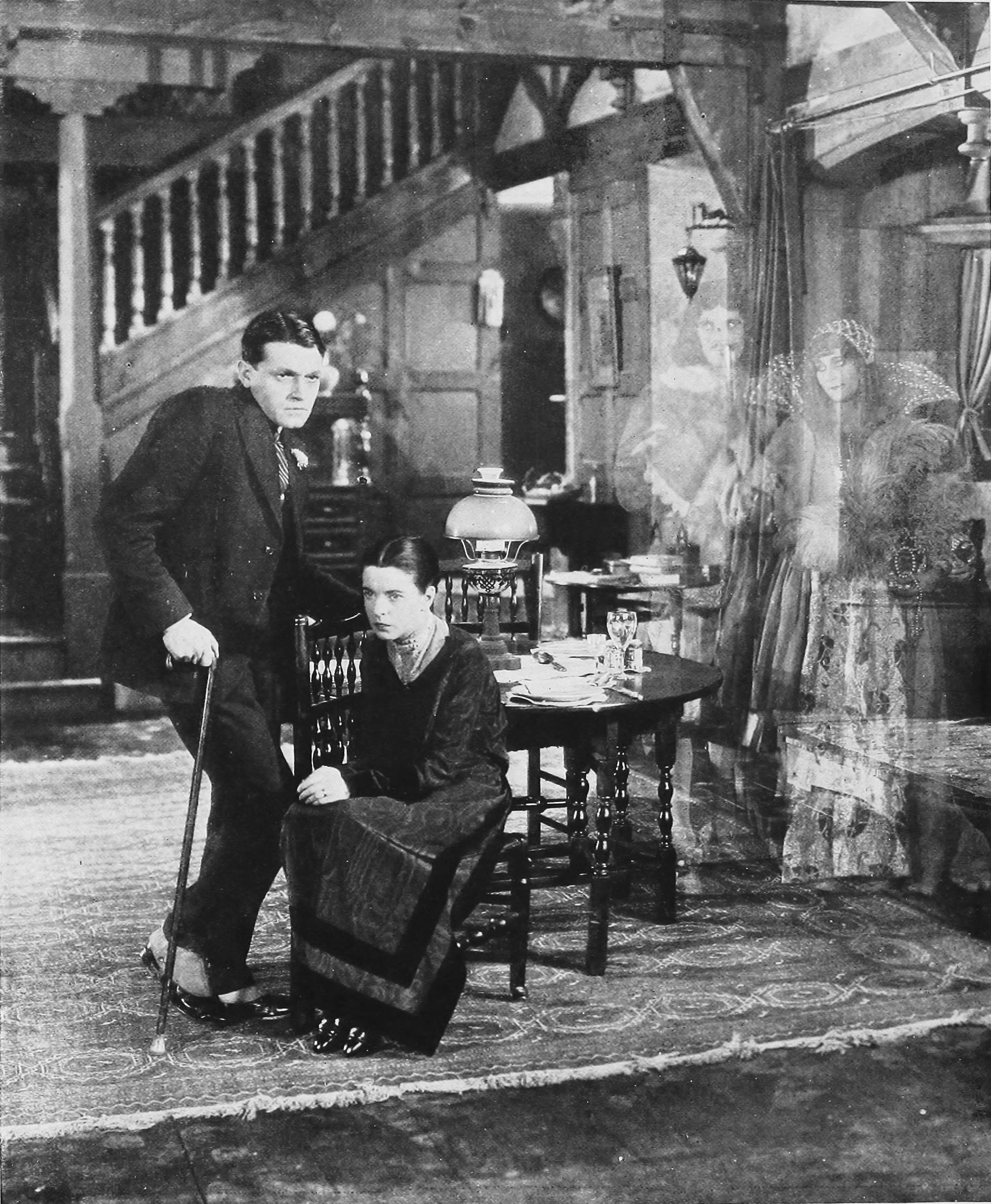
Richard Barthelmess and May McAvoy in The Enchanted Cottage

- Richard Barthelmess as Oliver Bashforth
- May McAvoy as Laura Pennington
- Ida Waterman as Mrs. Smallwood
- Alfred Hickman as Rupert Smallwood
- Florence Short as Ethel Bashforth
- Marion Coakley as Beatrice Vaughn
- Holmes Herbert as Major Hillgrove
- Ethel Wright as Mrs. Minnett
- Harry Allen as Riggs, the major's servant

== Reception ==
A reviewer for Photoplay wrote, "To anyone with a poetic soul, this picture will be a rare treat. But the too literal person will be sadly disappointed. A picture for folk who dare to dream. As such we cannot recommend it too highly." Michael L. Simmons, in his review for Exhibitor's Trade Review, praised Barthelmess's performance, writing he delivered "a powerful characterization, or, one might rather say, a character study, as stirring in its essence as any story which depend on lightning-bolt action for effect."

Fred Schader of Variety stated, "It is a picture that interests to a certain extent, but in its handling the general idea of the fantasy isn't driven home sufficiently early in the story to make it possible for the average film fan to grasp it." Marguerite Orndorff for The Educational Screen wrote: "There is a charm about the spoken or written word that is frequently too elusive to be caught by the camera, and in its efforts to make things clear, too often the screen makes them merely clumsy ... There was a danger of such a result in filming this whimsy of Pinero's, but the direction of John S. Robertson, and the understanding portrayals of May McAvoy and Richard Barthelmess have in a large measure preserved its delicacy."

== Preservation ==
A print of The Enchanted Cottage is preserved at the Library of Congress in Washington DC.

In 2024, Edward Lorusso restored the film from a 35mm print held by the Library of Congress. The restoration included a new score by the Mont Alto Motion Picture Orchestra.
