= The Enchanted Cottage (play) =

1920 play by Arthur Wing Pinero

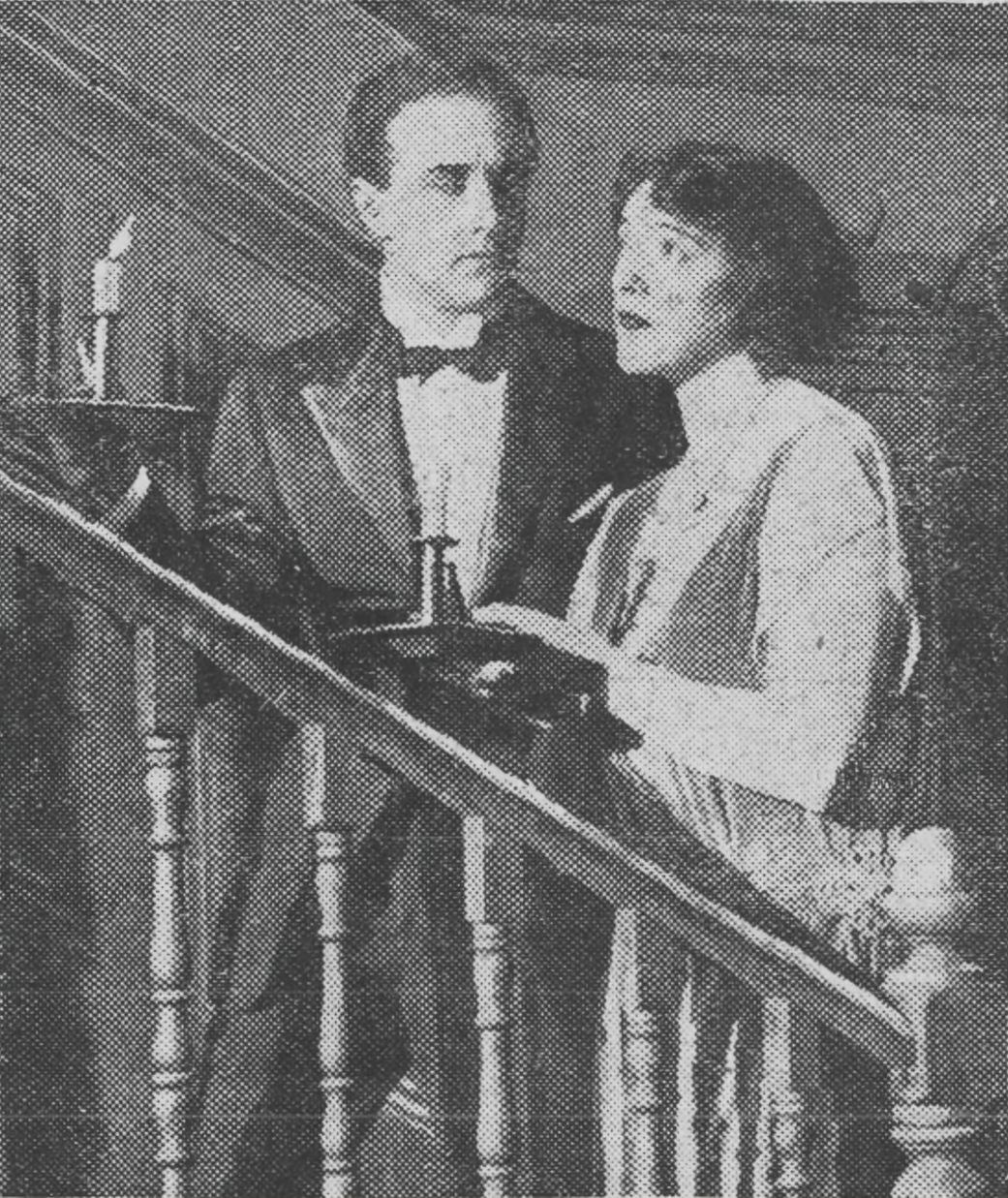
- Owen Nares and Laura Cowie (1922)
- Original language: English
- Written by: Arthur Wing Pinero
- Music by: Sir Frederic Cowen
- Subject: Love's special sight
- Genre: Comedy
- Setting: A cottage near an estate park in Sussex, Spring 1919.

Premiere
- Date: 1 March 1922 (UK); 31 March 1923 (US)
- Place: Duke of York's Theatre (UK); Ritz Theatre (US)
- Directed by: Arthur Pinero (UK); Jessie Bonstelle (US)

The Enchanted Cottage is a 1920 play by the British writer Arthur Wing Pinero, who called it a fable in three acts. It has a single setting, with nine speaking characters. The story concerns a maimed young officer and a dowdy village girl, who marry and find love in spite of their afflictions, after undergoing a disillusionment. The action of the play spans one month in Spring 1919. Hitherto known for realism, Pinero's mysticism in this play was compared unfavorably by critics to the works of J. M. Barrie.

The play was first produced in London's West End by Owen Nares and B. A. Myer, in association with Philip Michael Faraday, during March 1922. The author himself staged the production. It had original incidental music composed by Sir Frederic Cowen. Owen Nares and Laura Cowie starred, with Nicholas Hannen and Jean Cadell in support. It ran through April 1922, when Faraday had to give up tenancy of the theatre in which it played.

In North America the play was produced by William A. Brady in association with the Shuberts. Brady's son William A. Brady Jr helped Jessie Bonstelle stage it. The Enchanted Cottage had two brief tryouts, in Providence, Rhode Island, and Detroit, during late September and early October 1922. These tryouts starred Jessie Bonstelle and her company. The Broadway premiere occurred in late March 1923, starring Katharine Cornell and Noel Tearle, with Gilbert Emery and Clara Blandick in support. It ran through May of that year for 65 performances.

The Enchanted Cottage was adapted for films of the same title in 1924, 1945, and 2016.

== Characters ==
For clarity, only "real" characters are listed, in order of appearance within their scope. Dream characters, whom Pinero refers to as "shadows", are present only in Laura's vision during the final part of Act II and have no lines.

Lead

- Laura Pennington is starkly plain and awkward; a poor young woman of the local village, but gentle and generous.
- Lt. Oliver Bashforth is a well-off young man, maimed in body and spirit during the Great War, who seeks solitude.

Supporting

- Mrs. Minnett is 35, Oliver's housekeeper, prematurely aged and grown eccentric since her husband died in the war.
- Maj. Murray Hillgrove, DSO, MC, is a veteran, blinded at Vimy Ridge in April 1917, who befriends Oliver and Laura.

Featured

- Rev. Charles Corsellis is rector of the local parish, an elderly cleric, poor as a church mouse.
- Mrs. Corsellis is small and frail, clad in worn clothes; she is mother to seven children.
- Mrs. Smallwood is Oliver's mother, a loud insensitive woman who cannot bear to see him isolated.
- Rupert Smallwood is Oliver's pompous step-father.
- Rigg is a former soldier, who lost his right arm in the war; he is now the Major's servant and guide. (Note: Their relationship is more mutually beneficial than it might appear. With the end of wartime production and so many recently demobilized soldiers, there are few employment opportunities for a one-armed man.)
- Ethel is Oliver's older step-sister with an enormous nose; though "real", she appears only in the dream sequence.

Bit players

- Two Witches, Three Married Couples, Three Bridesmaids, Cherubs, Imps, Children

== Synopsis ==
All action occurs within a cottage on the edge of an estate park in Sussex. The cottage is very old, and gives the impression of once having been part of a grander building. The time is Spring 1919. The former soldiers wear civilian clothes except during the dream sequence of Act II.

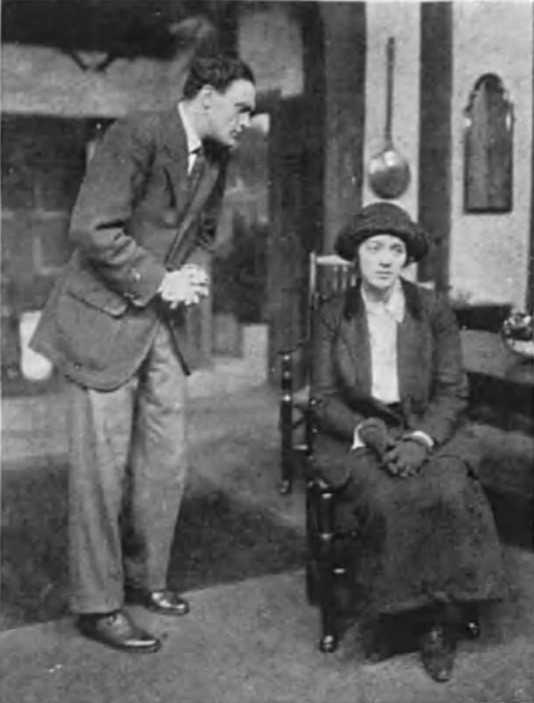

Act I: Relics of War (A Spring morning.) Oliver has taken a cottage away from his family, friends and past life. He loathes his injuries and especially the loss of his good humor to anger and neurosis. Rigg being away on an errand, Laura guides Major Hillgrove to the cottage, where Mrs. Minnett fetches Oliver to meet them. The Major has regaled Laura with village gossip about Mrs. Minnett being a bit eerie since her bereavement. Despite Oliver's neurotic state and perpetually aching wounds, he realizes Hillgrove is worse off, and for a little while at least comes out of his self-absorption. But after Hillgrove leaves, Oliver is beset by his mother and stepfather. Mrs. Smallwood wants Oliver to accept the Rev. Corsellis as his guardian. When Oliver rejects that idea, she insists Oliver's older sister Ethel, whom he loathes for her large nose and shrewish ways, come live with him and Mrs. Minnett. After they leave, Oliver is desperate to forestall having Ethel pushed onto him. He proposes to Laura, suggesting she would be a fitting wife for a maimed man. Laura demurs, rebuking him for his rudeness; ugly girls have dreams too, she scolds. Oliver persists, following her out of the cottage. Mrs. Minnett suddenly raises her hands and cackles alarmingly. (Curtain)

Act II: Strange Happenings, and a Dream (A month later, 9:30 pm.) Rigg guides the Major, who has been away for two weeks, into Oliver's cottage. Mrs. Minnett informs them the Bashforths, married a week now, will soon return from a walk. Hillgrove queries Mrs. Minnett about the mysterious change Oliver has hinted about in a letter. After Mrs. Minnett takes Rigg into the kitchen, the couple return. Removing their outer wraps, they are revealed as transformed people to the audience. Oliver is handsome, straight and moves energetically, while Laura, now pretty and graceful, has shed her awkwardness and dowdy clothes. The Major cannot see this, but he hears the joy in their voices as they explain what has happened. Their earnestness half-convinces him of the transformation. Laura suggests Mrs. Minnett is a witch who enchanted them, but Hillgrove says it is a heaven-sent miracle. Oliver and Laura grow subdued, as the Major confesses he too is hoping for one. Rain and thunder are heard outside; Laura grows a bit hysterical, but Mrs. Minnett tells her the worst is past. Oliver invites the Major to come back tomorrow; the Smallwoods, the Rector, and Mrs. Corsellis will also be coming. Rigg takes the Major home, and Oliver and Laura take candlesticks up the stairs, followed shortly by Mrs. Minnett.

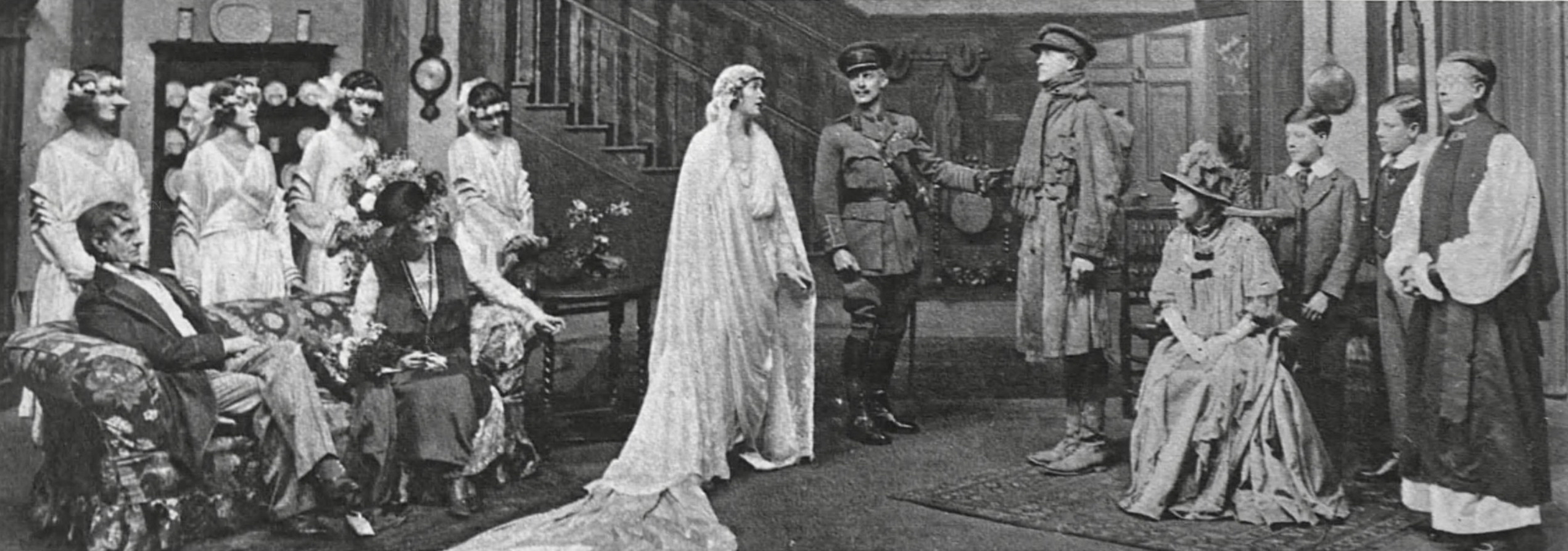

What follows is a dream scene, representing Laura's vision of what their marriage should have been like, mixed up with the thunderstorm and tales of witches. Honeymoon couples of the past, imps, cherubs, children and two witches pass in and out of the cottage, with Mrs. Minnett leading the latter. Amidst their capers, three bridesmaids enter, followed by Ethel, who exchanges greetings and a little banter with Laura, now dressed in bridal costume. The Smallwoods, the Rector, and Mrs. Corsellis also enter to greet Laura and sit for the coming ceremony. Major Hillgrove appears in khaki dress uniform with all his decorations, his sight restored, to greet the bride as best man. Last comes Oliver, in khaki field uniform with web belts and equipment, muddy and disheveled; he has come from the trenches, wearing a scarf Laura knitted for him. Amidst thunder the humans leave the cottage as fog covers the stage, Mrs. Minnett and the witches and imps scamper about and disappear into the fog, which parts to reveal Oliver and Laura in a white bed, asleep. (Curtain)

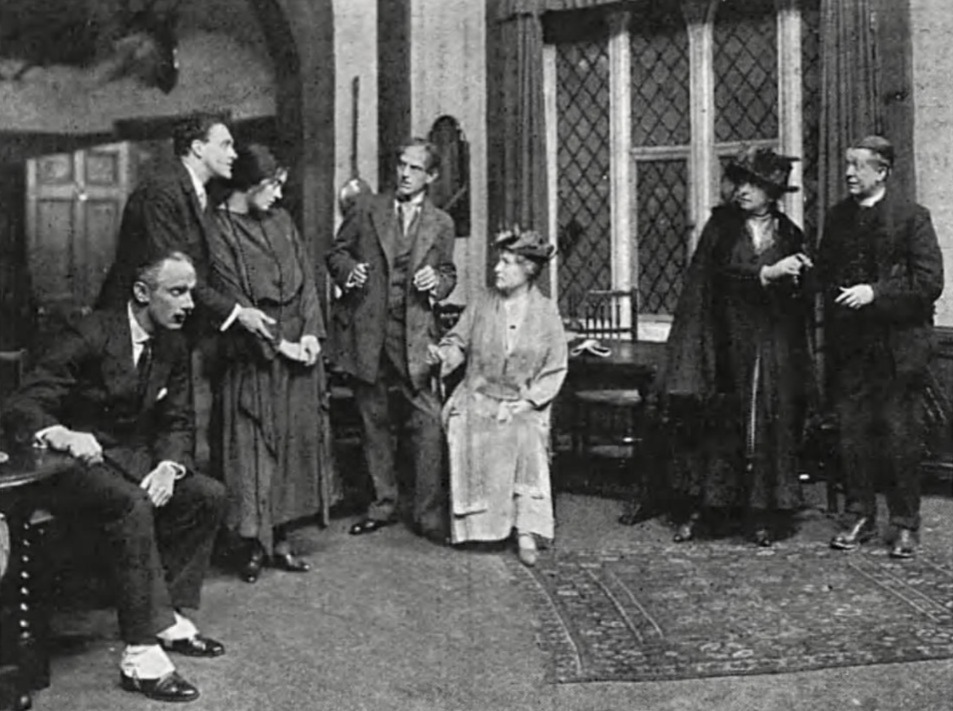

Act III: Eternal Truth (The following day, afternoon.) Rigg brings Major Hillgrove to the cottage, where a worn-out Mrs. Minnett admits them. The Bashforths are upstairs, so she goes to fetch them. Rigg observes to the Major that the old girl is looking a bit glum. The Major instructs Rigg to return for him in an hour. When Oliver and Laura come down the stairs they are still attractive and well-dressed. They beg Major Hillgrove to greet and prepare the Smallwoods and the Rector for their surprise, while they themselves wait upstairs. The Major agrees reluctantly; he has never met the Smallwoods, and the tale is fantastic. Oliver and Laura tell the Major something is wrong with Mrs. Minnett; when she heard the Smallwoods were coming she began to moan and fret. The meeting occurs and fully justifies the Major's trepidation. Mrs. Smallwood, never a good listener, addresses him as Wargrave instead of Hillgrove. The Rector and the Smallwoods look askance as the Major attempts to relate the transformation. When the time arrives for the couple to come down the stairs, they appear as they did in the first act; twisted, awkward, and ill-favored. The visitors are naturally angry and sarcastic at what they consider a deception, and the Major is much embarrassed. After they leave, he questions Mrs. Minnett sternly, and she admits to encouraging the couple to consider themselves transformed. She knew they saw each other with love's sight. The Major is shaken; he had hoped there was a change. Laura and Oliver are bitter at first, but their love rekindles in mutual comfort. As the stage darkens, Laura sits sleeping in a chair, while Mrs. Minnett as an angel places a sleeping infant in her arms. (Curtain)

== Original production ==
=== Background ===
According to a newspaper account, Arthur Wing Pinero had completely outlined the play in 1919, and finished the first act by April 1920. The title was not known until February 1922, when it was learned Owen Nares and B. A. Meyer would produce it at the Duke of York's Theatre, then tenanted by Philip Michael Faraday. The author was cagey about the storyline, though he did indicate it was fantasy. Most of the cast was already engaged by mid-February. Rehearsals, under the direction of the playwright, were ongoing by 18 February 1922, and it was known that Sir Frederic Cowen was composing original incidental music for The Enchanted Cottage.

William A. Brady reportedly obtained the American rights for The Enchanted Cottage in early May 1922, though it was later learned that J. J. Shubert actually signed the agreement with Sir Arthur Pinero, in association with William A. Brady.

=== Cast ===
Principal cast during the original West End run.
Role	Actor	Dates	Notes and sources
Laura Pennington	Laura Cowie	1 Mar 1922 – 22 Apr 1922	
Oliver Bashforth	Owen Nares	1 Mar 1922 – 22 Apr 1922	
Mrs. Minnett	Jean Cadell	1 Mar 1922 – 22 Apr 1922	
Major Hillgrove	Nicholas Hannen	1 Mar 1922 – 22 Apr 1922	Like his character, Hannen had served in the First World War with distinction.
Rev. Corsellis	O. B. Clarence	1 Mar 1922 – 22 Apr 1922	
Mrs. Corsellis	May Whitty	1 Mar 1922 – 22 Apr 1922	
Mrs. Smallwood	Winifred Emery	1 Mar 1922 – 22 Apr 1922	
Rupert Smallwood	Norman Forbes	1 Mar 1922 – 22 Apr 1922	
Rigg	Ronald Simpson	1 Mar 1922 – 22 Apr 1922	
Ethel	Dorothy Stephen	1 Mar 1922 – 22 Apr 1922	This character was also referred to as "Fourth Bridesmaid"; Stephen wore a large false nose for it.

Principal cast during the original Broadway run.
Role	Actor	Dates	Notes and sources
Laura Pennington	Katharine Cornell	31 Mar 1923 – 26 May 1923	
Oliver Bashforth	Noel Tearle	31 Mar 1923 – 26 May 1923	He was a British cousin of American actor Conway Tearle.
Mrs. Minnett	Clara Blandick	31 Mar 1923 – 26 May 1923	
Major Hillgrove	Gilbert Emery	31 Mar 1923 – 26 May 1923	
Rev. Corsellis	Harry Neville	31 Mar 1923 – 26 May 1923	
Mrs. Corsellis	Ethel Wright	31 Mar 1923 – 26 May 1923	
Mrs. Smallwood	Winifred Fraser	31 Mar 1923 – 26 May 1923	
Rupert Smallwood	Herbert Bunston	31 Mar 1923 – 26 May 1923	
Rigg	Seldon Bennett	31 Mar 1923 – 26 May 1923	
Ethel	Gwyneth Gordon	31 Mar 1923 – 26 May 1923	The character of Oliver's older step-sister was played by a Montreal society girl in her first play.

=== West End premiere and reception ===
The first performance of The Enchanted Cottage was its West End premiere at the Duke of York's Theatre on 1 March 1922. The reviewer for the Evening Standard noted the difficulty of using the supernatural on stage, and suggested it was too easy to be cynical about Pinero's use of fantasy and ignore the inspiring message. They felt Owen Nares had transcended his image and never before shown "himself so technically skilled and engrossing an actor". They also saluted Laura Cowie for her "self-sacrifice", but "the witchcraft does not work quite credibly". The critic for The Daily Telegraph presented what would become a common judgement, that Pinero had tried fantasy but suffered in comparison to J. M. Barrie's light touch. They said the first two acts worked well enough, though the dream sequence lacked "poetic fancy", but the play broke down in a weak third act.

The Guardian reviewer said Pinero had indeed given the audience a fantasy, but "he stirred our pity and fear not because of the witches and fairies but despite them". While the blighted couple faced their issues in the third act "the play had greatness", but during the dream sequence it fell to "pantomime level". They had praise for the acting of Owen Nares, Laura Cowie, and Nicholas Hannen in presenting believable characters, but felt the housekeeper witch, though well-acted by Jean Cadell, was a distraction.

The criticism for The Enchanted Cottage gave rise to a complaint: a correspondent to The Daily Telegraph wrote about the lack of critical appreciation for incidental music in plays. The writer said that Sir Frederic Cowen, who composed the music and conducted the theatre orchestra in its performance, was twice called for by the audience during the second act curtain, which no reviewer mentioned. A supporting letter specified the orchestra consisted of "a quartet of strings, a flute, clarinet, horn, and piano", with music confined to an overture and during the dream scene. A critic going by "F. E. B." of The Musical Times commented that the music was melodious and had great effect in the play. The music later became an orchestral suite performed separately.

The Enchanted Cottage closed at the Duke of York's Theater on 22 April 1922, with suggestions it would taken on tour or revived later.

=== US tryouts ===
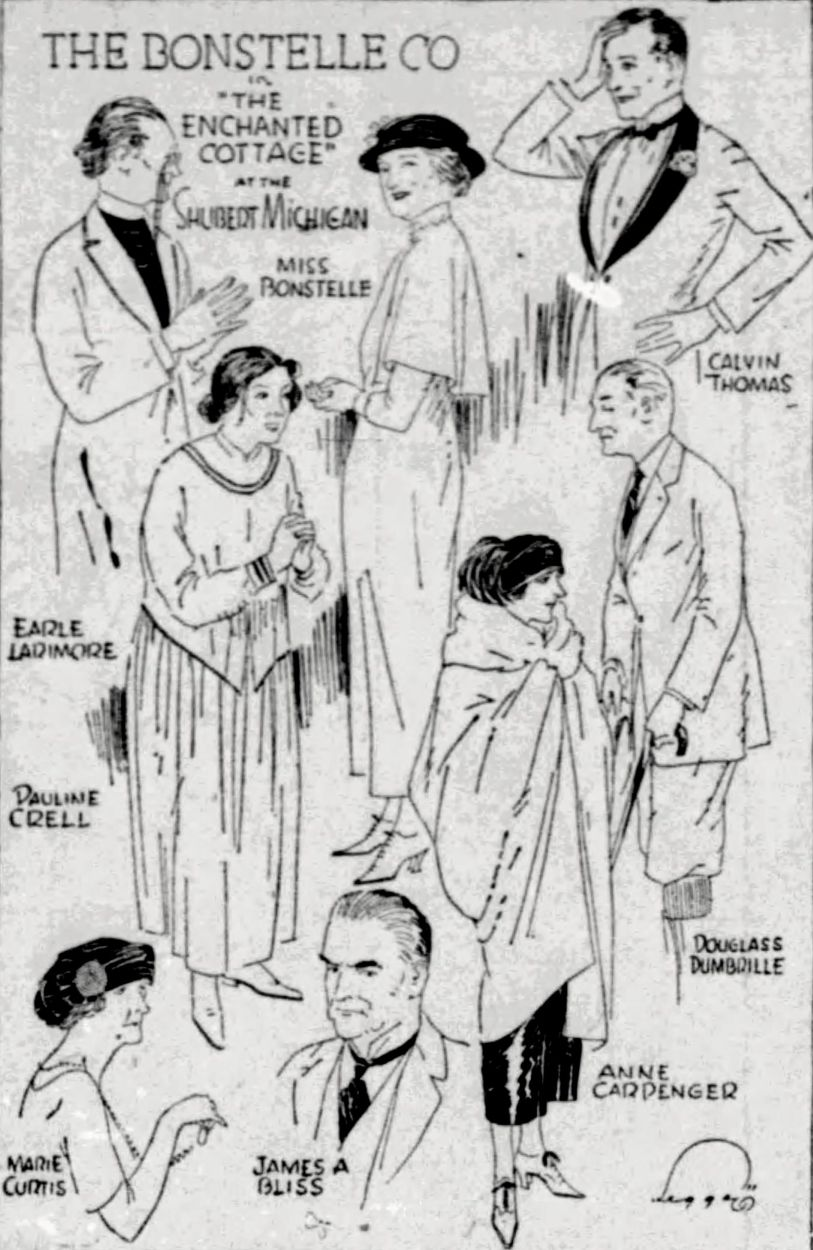

Surprisingly, the first performances William A. Brady and the Shuberts authorized in America for The Enchanted Company were by a stock company manager, Jessie Bonstelle, though the Brady office was at pains to suggest these were tryouts. Jessie Bonstelle had been promised the direction of the Broadway premiere, but the value of these tryouts was diminished in that not a single performer in them would be used in the cast on Broadway. There were two brief "tryouts": a short stint in Providence, Rhode Island, starting 25 September 1922, and a week-long engagement at the Shubert Michigan in Detroit, (Note: In 1922, this theater was opposite the Cadillac Hotel.) beginning 2 October 1922. These tryouts were staged by Melville Burke, and starred Jessie Bonstelle as Laura and Calvin Thomas as Oliver, with Pauline Crell as Mrs. Minnett, Douglas Dumbrille as Major Hillgrove, and Earle Larimore as the Rev. Corsellis. Detroit reviewer Len G. Shaw felt the play had too much conversation, but the acting was good and well received. For the first performances the actors operated under the handicap of a hurriedly assembled wardrobe, as the railroad company had lost their costumes.

=== Broadway premiere and reception ===
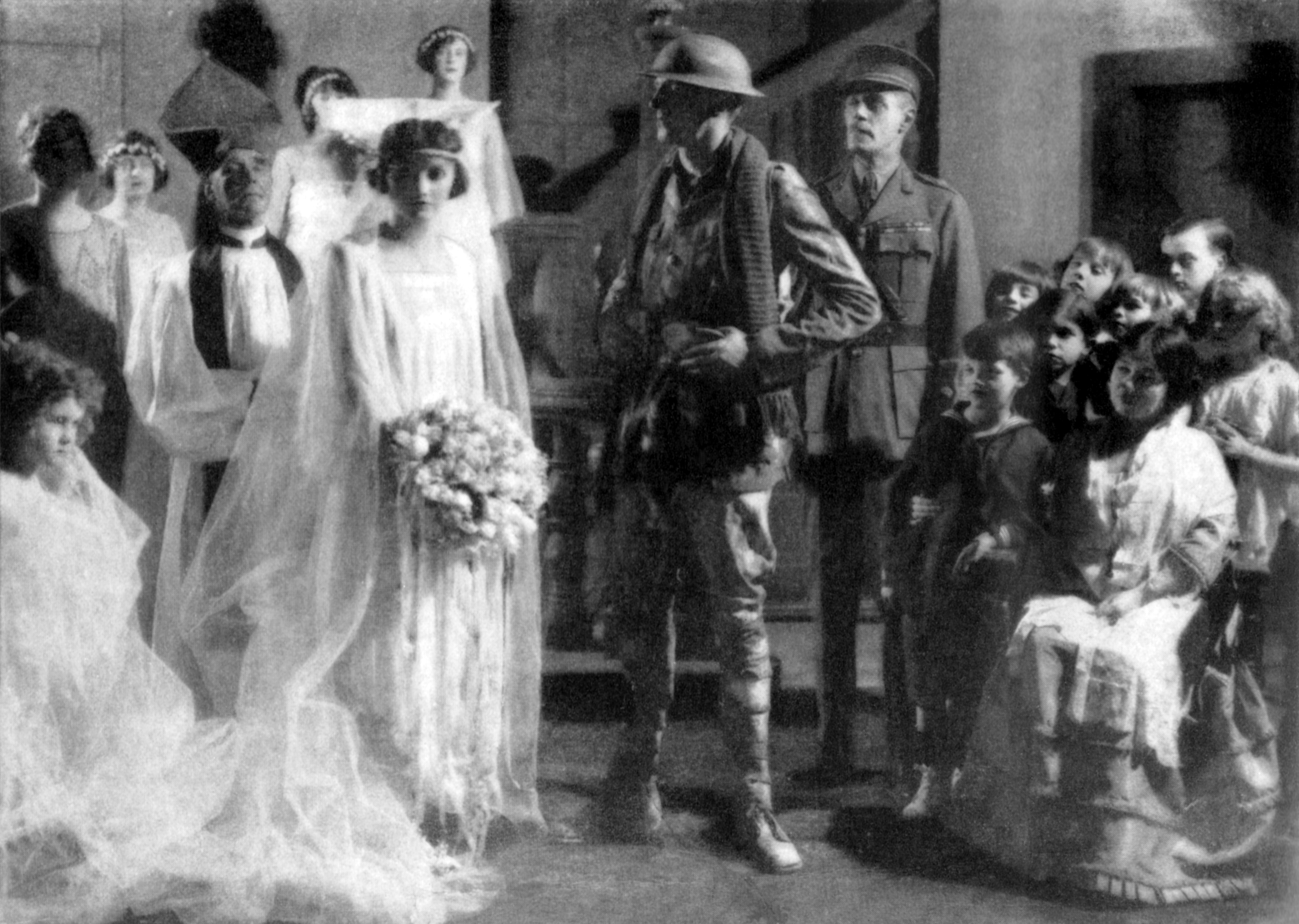

There was very little advance notice for The Enchanted Cottage until late March 1923. The cast (Katharine Cornell, Noel Tearle, Clara Blandick, Gilbert Emery, and others) and directors (Jessie Bonstelle and William A. Brady Jr) were announced a week before the opening date, which itself was pulled forward. Rehearsals were still ongoing the last week before the opening. The Broadway premiere occurred at the Ritz Theatre on Saturday, 31 March 1923. The Brooklyn Daily Times reviewer said that "If the gospel of Coue still has potency among us, The Enchanted Cottage should be successful". They judged the acting of Gilbert Emery as Major Hillgrove the best in the play, followed closely by Katharine Cornell as Laura. And they speculated as to how much better the play might have been in the hands of J. M. Barrie. Arthur Pollock thought it typical of Pinero, that when he turned to fantasy after decades of realism, he should make it "bare and literal". He felt Pinero had expended a great deal of effort for a simple idea, "that love is blind". Pollock judged "The acting, in general, like the play, was transparent, conventional, more obvious than necessary".

Burns Mantle wrote that The Enchanted Cottage was "sentimental and more depressing than cheering". Echoing other American critics, he thought Mrs. Minnett a much older woman, calling her "an ancient crone", which was not Pinero's intent for the character. (Note: The Broadway casting of Clara Blandick then 48 years old may be responsible; her counterpart in London, Jean Cadell was much closer to the character's age of 35 as given by Pinero. The playwright also made clear that Oliver and Laura's romance had a potential echo in Mrs. Minnett and Rigg.) John Corbin in The New York Times said "The production and the acting are admirable" and reported a slight difference in the Broadway version's ending, in that a child went to the sleeping Laura, rather Mrs. Minnick carrying an infant to her. Corbin was emphatic that "in the resolute reality of the last act lies the whole purport of the play". His interpretation of Pinero's thesis was that England was full of maimed veterans and worthy spinsters whose future could be redeemed through children.

The Enchanted Cottage closed at the Ritz Theatre on 26 May 1923, having had roughly the same length of run as the West End production.

== Adaptations ==
=== Film ===
- The Enchanted Cottage - 1924 American silent film
- The Enchanted Cottage - 1945 American film
- The Enchanted Cottage - 2016 film

== Bibliography ==
- Arthur Pinero. The Enchanted Cottage: A Fable in Three Acts. William Heinemann, 1922.
