= The Cabinet Minister =

Play written by Arthur Wing Pinero

The Cabinet Minister is an 1890 comedy play by the British writer Arthur Wing Pinero. A cabinet minister spends well beyond his means, leading to massive debts.

== Adaptations ==
In 2024, Nancy Caroll adapted and performed in The Cabinet Minister at Menier Chocolate Factory, London.

== Bibliography ==
- Booth, Michael R. Prefaces to English nineteenth-century theatre. Oxford University Press.
- Ousby, Ian. The Cambridge guide to literature in English. Cambridge University Press, 1993.
