= Iris (play) =

Iris is a 1901 play by the British writer Arthur Wing Pinero.

== Film adaptation ==
In 1916 it was turned into a film Iris directed by Cecil M. Hepworth and starring Alma Taylor, one of the leading stars of the era.

== Bibliography ==
- Goble, Alan. The Complete Index to Literary Sources in Film. Walter de Gruyter, 1999.
