= Arthur Wing Pinero =

British playwright and actor (1855–1934)

Pinero in 1895

Sir Arthur Wing Pinero (24 May 1855 – 23 November 1934) was an English playwright and, early in his career, actor.

Pinero was drawn to the theatre from an early age, and became a professional actor at the age of 19. He gained experience as a supporting actor in British provincial theatres, and from 1876 to 1881 was a member of Henry Irving's company, based at the Lyceum Theatre, London.

Pinero wrote his first play in 1877. Seven years later, having written 15 more, three of them highly successful, he abandoned acting and became a full-time playwright. He first became known for a series of farces, of which The Magistrate (1885) was the longest-running. During the 1890s he turned to serious subjects. The Second Mrs Tanqueray (1893), dealing with a woman with a scandalous past, was regarded as shocking, but ran well and made a large profit. His other successes included Trelawny of the "Wells" (1898), a romantic comedy celebrating the theatre, old and new, and The Gay Lord Quex (1899), about a reformed roué and a spirited young woman. A venture into opera, with a libretto for The Beauty Stone (1898), was not a success, and Pinero thereafter generally stuck to his familiar genre of society dramas and comedies.

Although he continued to write throughout the first three decades of the 20th century and into the fourth, it is Pinero's work from the 1880s and 1890s that has endured. There have been numerous revivals of many of his plays; and some have been adapted for the cinema or as musicals. By his later years, Pinero was seen as old-fashioned, and his last plays were not successful. He died in London at the age of 79.

== Life and career ==
=== Early years ===
John Daniel Pinero, sketched by his son, 1870

Pinero was born in London, the only son, and second of three children, of John Daniel Pinero (1798–1871), and his wife Lucy, née Daines (1836–1905). Pinero's father and grandfather were London solicitors. They were descended from the Pinheiro family, described by Pinero's biographer John Dawick as "a distinguished family of Sephardic Jews who rose to prominence in medieval Portugal before suffering the persecutions of the Inquisition". Pinero's branch of the family fled to England. His grandfather abandoned the Jewish faith, became a member of the Church of England, married a Christian Englishwoman, Margaret Wing, and became a highly successful lawyer. His younger son, Pinero's father, also took up the legal profession, but was much less successful; Pinero was brought up in circumstances that were not poor but were not affluent. He attended Spa Fields Chapel charity school in Exmouth Street, Clerkenwell, London, until the age of ten, when he went to work in his father's office.

John Daniel Pinero died in May 1871, leaving very little money. To contribute to the family income, Pinero continued to work as a solicitor's clerk, earning £1 a week. In the evenings he studied elocution at the Birkbeck Literary and Scientific Institution. He and his fellow students staged several productions of plays, and Pinero became irresistibly drawn to the theatre. In May 1874 he abandoned the legal profession and joined R. H. Wyndham at the Theatre Royal, Edinburgh, as a "general utility" actor. He made his professional debut in the small role of a groom in an adaptation of Wilkie Collins's The Woman in White.

=== Actor and rising playwright: 1874–1884 ===
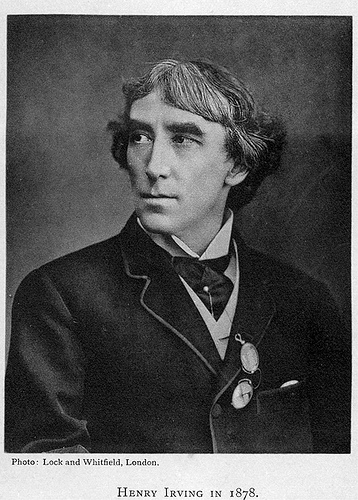
Henry Irving: Pinero was a member of his company from 1876 to 1881.

As a junior member of Wyndham's company Pinero quickly gained experience in a range of roles, supporting E. A. Sothern in Our American Cousin, and Charles Mathews in the Balzac adaptation A Game of Speculation, and graduating to larger parts such as Crosstree in Black-Eyed Susan. His engagement in Edinburgh came to a sudden end in February 1875 when the theatre was destroyed by fire. He was fortunate in being offered another provincial engagement, at the Royal Alexandra Theatre, Liverpool, where he began to be noticed by the press, gaining approving reviews for his acting in supporting roles. A production of Miss Gwilt, an adaptation of Wilkie Collins's Armadale, starring Ada Cavendish, was reported by the theatrical paper The Era as "a genuine triumph"; the play transferred from Liverpool to the West End, and Pinero retained his role as an elderly solicitor. The production was not the hoped-for success in London, but Pinero received good notices for his performance, and when the run finished after ten weeks he was immediately engaged by Henry Irving's manager, Mrs Bateman, as a member of the supporting cast for Irving's forthcoming provincial tour.

Although the tour was uncongenial, and Pinero gathered some highly critical notices, he continued to work as a supporting actor to Irving for five years. He first appeared at the Lyceum, Irving's London base, in December 1876 and played a total of 21 parts there between then and 1881. His Shakespearean roles were Lord Stanley in Richard III (1877), Rosencrantz in Hamlet (1878), Guildenstern in Hamlet (1879), Salarino in The Merchant of Venice (1879), and Roderigo in Othello (1881). In a revival of the melodrama The Bells, with which Irving's name was already synonymous, he played Dr Zimmer (1878).

While in Irving's company Pinero wrote his first plays. He began with £200 a Year, a one-act comedy written in a single afternoon for a colleague to present at a benefit performance in 1877. The play was well received and was given several further performances, bringing Pinero's name a modest amount of publicity. His first full-length play, La Comète, was staged in a theatre in Croydon in 1878, and he wrote four more one-act comedies, staged in London in 1878–1880, playing in two of them – Daisy's Escape and Bygones – at the Lyceum. Another of these, Hester's Mystery (1880), written for the comic actor J. L. Toole, ran for 300 performances at the Folly Theatre.

Myra Holme, who married Pinero in 1883

Pinero's profile as a playwright was further raised by The Money Spinner, a full-length comedy, first given at the Prince's Theatre, Manchester in November 1880 and then at the St James's in London in January 1881. The theatre historian J. P. Wearing regards the play as of particular importance in the history of the St James's, a theatre previously known more for its failures than its successes. Pinero's play was regarded as daringly unconventional and a risky venture, but it caught on with the public, particularly for the character Baron Croodle, a "disreputable but delightful old reprobate and card-shark" played by John Hare. The following year Pinero wrote the first of eleven more plays for the St James's, The Squire (1881). It caused controversy by its supposed similarity to Thomas Hardy's Far from the Madding Crowd.

After leaving Irving's company Pinero joined another well-known London management, Squire Bancroft and his wife Effie, who ran the Haymarket Theatre. For them he played the Marquis de Cevennes (Plot and Passion, 1881), Sir Alexander Shendryn (Ours, 1882), Hanway (Odette, 1882) and finally Sir Anthony Absolute in The Rivals (1884) as part of a starry cast that included Squire Bancroft, Johnston Forbes-Robertson, Lionel Brough and Julia Gwynne. Pinero received mixed notices, some unfavourable, and others among the best of his acting career. This was his last professional engagement as an actor. (Note: Pinero made a single later appearance as an actor, in the role of Dolly Spanker in a special performance of London Assurance to mark the retirement of the Bancrofts from management at the Haymarket in July 1885. Other stars appearing in that programme included Arthur Cecil, Johnston Forbes-Robertson, John Hare, Henry Irving, David James, Madge Kendal, W. H. Kendal, Lillie Langtry, William Terriss, Ellen Terry, J. L. Toole, Mrs John Wood and Charles Wyndham, as well as the Bancrofts themselves.)

During his time at the Haymarket Pinero married Myra Emily Wood (c. 1852–1919), who had acted under the stage name of Myra Holme, a widow with two children, Angus and Myra, from her first marriage. The wedding took place on 19 April 1883. There were no children of the marriage to Pinero.

=== Farces and drawing-room comedies: 1884–1893 ===
Arthur Cecil as Mr Posket in The Magistrate, 1885

With the exception of two adaptations of serious French works, The Ironmaster (1884) and Mayfair (1885), (Note: The former was adapted from Georges Ohnet's Le Maître de forges, and the latter from Victorien Sardou's Maison neuve.) Pinero's output between 1884 and 1893 consisted of six farces and five comedies. During this period he became particularly associated with the Court Theatre, where five of his farces were presented, with great success at the box office, between 1885 and 1892, beginning with The Magistrate. Wearing writes that in these plays Pinero "attacked facets of Victorian society by creating credible though blinkered characters, trying to preserve their respectability while trapped in a relentless whirlpool of catastrophically illogical events".

Pinero told an interviewer that with the first of his Court farces, The Magistrate, he had tried "to raise farce a little from the low pantomime level". Instead of relying on the Parisian stereotype, revolving around potentially adulterous liaisons, he tried to create believable characters in credible situations. The piece played for 363 performances in its first run, the first play in the history of the Court to run for more than a year. When its star, Arthur Cecil, required a summer break, Beerbohm Tree deputised for him for three weeks. Three touring companies were needed to meet the demand for the play in the British provinces, and local managements in Australia, India and South Africa were licensed to stage it; Pinero travelled to New York for the American premiere, at Daly's Theatre in October 1885. He had turned 30 earlier that year. A retrospective review of his career published in 1928 pointed out that Pinero – who had recently celebrated 50 years as a West End playwright – achieved fame at an unusually early age: his contemporaries Bernard Shaw, J. M. Barrie and John Galsworthy were all in their thirties before their plays were produced in London.

Pinero's other Court farces – The Schoolmistress (1886), Dandy Dick (1887), The Cabinet Minister (1890) and The Amazons (1893) – ran for 291, 262, 199 and 114 performances respectively, an aggregate of 866. Their success was outstripped by that of the gentler comedy Sweet Lavender, which ran at Terry's Theatre for 684 performances from March 1888 to January 1890. This piece concerns an impoverished clerk, a bibulous but wise barrister, fraudulent bankers, a long-lost sweetheart and happy endings all round. It was billed as "a domestic drama", and was mainly comic, but, The Era reported, "there are scenes where the laughter is hushed, where smiles give way to tears, and where mirth is merged in heartfelt sympathy".

=== Serious plays ===
Plays in a similar vein to Sweet Lavender – The Weaker Sex (1888) and Lady Bountiful (1891) – did not match its success, running for 61 and 65 performances respectively. Nonetheless Pinero's attention continued to turn more to serious than to farcical topics. Wearing comments that Pinero began to write "problem plays", considering "the double standard of morality, applied unequally to men and women". His first was The Profligate (1889), in which past misdeeds come to haunt a seemingly respectable man. It was chosen to inaugurate the new Garrick Theatre, but the lessee, John Hare, persuaded a reluctant Pinero to tone down the ending to avoid alienating his respectable society audience: in the final version the protagonist does not kill himself, as Pinero had written, but is forgiven by his wife. The play ran for 129 performances.

Punch cartoon showing Pinero's relief as the second Mrs Tanqueray (Mrs Patrick Campbell) successfully leaps over a hurdle marked "Convention", followed by George Alexander as Tanqueray

When his next such drama came to be produced Pinero remained firm: the play would, and did, end in tragedy. This was his best-known serious work, The Second Mrs Tanqueray (1893). While he was planning it, several plays of Henrik Ibsen were presented in London for the first time, regarded by much of polite society as avant garde, blunt and shocking. (Note: Ibsen's Ghosts, Rosmersholm, The Lady from the Sea and Hedda Gabler were all given in London for the first time during 1891 and 1892, mostly at special matinées.) Seeing Ghosts led Pinero to reconsider his approach to playwriting, which now seemed old-fashioned by comparison. He was far from uncritical of Ibsen's plays, but recognised that if he was to be a serious dramatist he must treat social problems and human misconduct frankly.

The Second Mrs Tanqueray centred on "a woman with a past". Hare declined to present it, and George Alexander, the actor-manager running the St James's Theatre, to whom Pinero then offered the play, said, "Sorry, I daren't do it". He had second thoughts, and accepted it. The production was scheduled to replace Oscar Wilde's Lady Windermere's Fan, which also focused on a woman with a far from respectable past. Unlike Pinero's play, Wilde's ended happily, and was seen by the respectable habitués of the St James's as mildly shocking but acceptable. In Pinero's play Paula Tanqueray kills herself. In Wearing's words, "although not as avant-garde as Ibsen's plays, Tanqueray confronted its fashionable St James's audiences with as forceful a social message as they could stomach". Both Pinero and Alexander were apprehensive about the public reception of the piece, but it was a sensational success at its opening in May 1893, made a profit of more than £10,000, (Note: According to the Measuring Worth website this equates to £4,300,000 in 2017 values in terms of average earnings.) and was still playing to full houses when Alexander, who disliked acting in long runs, closed the production in April 1894 after 225 performances.

Wearing comments that the public's appetite for similar Pinero plays varied. The Notorious Mrs Ebbsmith (1895) managed a run of 88 performances, The Benefit of the Doubt (1895) ran for 74, The Thunderbolt (1908) and Mid-Channel (1909) both ran for 58.

=== Fin de siècle ===
The year 1898 saw one of Pinero's most enduring successes and his most conspicuous failure. The first was Trelawny of the "Wells", the second, The Beauty Stone. In Trelawny of the "Wells", described by a 21st-century critic as "Pinero's love letter to theatre", the author addressed his regular topics of class and inexorable change, to which he added a study of the enduring power of the theatre. The play shows a popular actress in mid-Victorian melodramas marrying into the aristocracy, regretting it, returning to the stage and finding that she can no longer make the old style of plays work, successfully switching to works in the new realistic style. Wearing calls the play Pinero's homage to Tom Robertson, whose pioneering theatrical realism influenced two generations of writers including W. S. Gilbert and Bernard Shaw as well as Pinero. The critics were confused by the play. Pinero commented that they seemed "divided as to whether the piece is a weak farce or an imperfect realistic drama". It had a good, though not outstanding, run of 135 performances at the Court, but subsequently became one of Pinero's most revived plays.

At the same time the impresario Richard D'Oyly Carte was in need of a new opera for his Savoy Theatre after the end of Gilbert and Sullivan's long partnership. It is not clear why Carte chose to commission a libretto from two writers with no experience in the genre, but for Arthur Sullivan's The Beauty Stone he brought together Pinero and J. Comyns Carr, an art critic, gallery owner and part-time author of dramas. (Note: Sullivan already knew both men, having previously written a song for Pinero's The Profligate and incidental music for Carr's medieval drama King Arthur (1895).) Sullivan, who was used to Gilbert's skill and flexibility, quickly found his new collaborators inept: "gifted and brilliant men, with no experience in writing for music, and yet obstinately refusing to accept any suggestions from me as to form and construction". He later wrote in his diary, "heartbreaking to have to try to make a musical piece out of such badly constructed (for music) mess of involved sentences". The musical analyst William Parry describes the libretto as "a verbose mess ... suffused with a fussy air of arch medievalism". At its premiere, on 28 May 1898, the piece ran for four hours, and Pinero and Carr had to accept some drastic cuts to their words, which also meant sacrificing some of Sullivan's best music. The reviews for the music ranged from polite to enthusiastic; for the libretto they ranged from polite to damning. Max Beerbohm, who had succeeded Shaw as theatre critic of The Saturday Review and who was to become a persistent irritant to Pinero, was particularly waspish. Besides the shortcomings of the libretto, the uncomic, romantic style of the piece was not in keeping with the traditions of the Savoy or the expectations of its audience, and the opera closed on 16 July after 50 performances – the worst run for any of Sullivan's operas.

Within a year of the disappointment of The Beauty Stone Pinero returned to successful form with a four-act play The Gay Lord Quex, a comedy of manners, in succession to two others in the genre, The Times (1891) and The Princess and the Butterfly (1897). The Gay Lord Quex, a story of a determined and resourceful young woman and a reformed aristocratic philanderer, had an initial run of 300 performances, and has proved one of Pinero's more revivable plays. (Note: There have been London revivals in 1902 and 1908, with Sir John Hare in the title role; 1923, with George Grossmith Jr.; 1943, with Frith Banbury; and 1975, with Daniel Massey, in a production directed by Sir John Gielgud.)

=== 20th century ===
George Alexander and Irene Vanbrugh in His House in Order, 1906

In the first decade of the century Pinero continued to be regarded as among the forefront of British playwrights. His comedy of manners Iris (1901) ran for 115 performances, and in 1906 he had one of his biggest successes, with His House in Order, another work for Alexander and the St James's. This piece is a drama about a put-upon second wife who eventually triumphs over the domineering family of her husband's dead first wife and wins his undivided love. It was a triumph for Irene Vanbrugh and Alexander in the lead roles, and for Pinero; it ran for 430 performances and took more than £78,000 at the box-office. The alliance between Alexander had by now become a firm friendship, punctuated by occasional arguments between the actor-manager and the author, who became extremely prescriptive about the staging of his plays and the delivery of his lines.

Another of Pinero's friends was Shaw. As authors they held very different views of the nature and purpose of drama. Although both addressed social problems in their plays, Shaw, who held that all good art is didactic, concentrated on the problem itself, whereas Pinero focused more on the people affected by it, which Shaw felt weakened the argument. Nevertheless, they were on good terms and both were prominent in campaigns for a national theatre and the reform or abolition of theatre censorship. Shaw conceived the idea that playwrights needed a titled figure to lead their campaigns, and lobbied the British government to secure a knighthood for Pinero. Whether because of Shaw's canvassing or not is unknown, but Pinero was knighted in 1909, only the second dramatist to receive the honour (Gilbert having been knighted two years earlier). Pinero rarely used the title, but shortened his signature from "Arthur W. Pinero" to "Arthur Pinero".

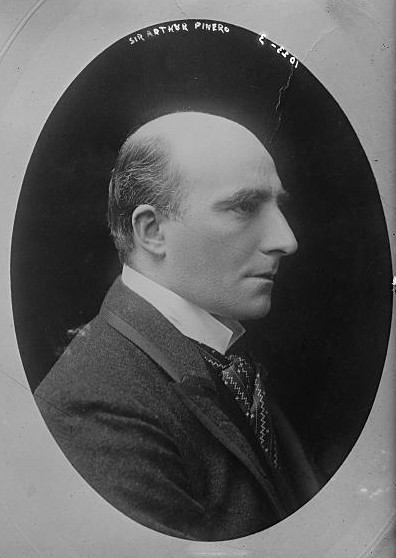
Pinero aged about 55

In the second decade of the century Pinero had his last two real successes. The comedy The "Mind the Paint" Girl ran at the Duke of York's Theatre for 126 performances in 1912, and The Big Drum, his last play for Alexander had 111 performances at the St James's in 1915. The First World War badly affected his wish and ability to write. He had suffered an emotional blow in 1913 when his stepson killed himself, and the outbreak of war the following year appalled Pinero. Following the sinking of RMS Lusitania by a German U-boat on 7 May 1915, he wrote to The Times calling on naturalised British citizens of German origin to make public statements of their loyalty to the King and reject Germany's methods of warfare. In the following days, numerous letters were received by the newspaper from naturalised Britons affirming their loyalty, including public figures such as Sir Ernest Cassel, Sir George Henschel, Sir Carl Meyer and Sir Felix Schuster. Among others who came under public pressure because of the war was Shaw, who opposed it strenuously, and was much vilified by the public and even by his colleagues. Pinero refused to join in the chorus of disapproval, and his friendship with Shaw endured, although they saw less of each other after Shaw resigned from the Dramatists' Club under pressure from its pro-war members led by Henry Arthur Jones.

Pinero's wife died in 1919, having been an invalid for some time. Although her death was foreseen it caused Pinero deep distress, and after it he was often despondent, despite the devoted attention of his stepdaughter. During the last years of his life Pinero gradually ceased to be a figure of importance in the theatre. After the end of the war he wrote eight more plays; two of them remained unstaged and of the four that were produced in London the longest-running lasted for 64 performances.

His heart weakened by a serious bout of influenza, Pinero failed to survive an operation for a hernia. He died on 23 November 1934 in Marylebone Nursing Home. A memorial service was held at St Marylebone Parish Church on 28 November 1934, after which, by Pinero's request, his ashes were buried in his wife's grave in the churchyard of Chiddingfold, Surrey, close to their former country house.

== Works ==
=== Plays ===
Title	Theatre	Date	Genre	Acts	Perfs	Notes
£200 a Year	Globe	6 October 1877	comedy	1	36	
La Comète	Theatre Royal, Croydon	22 April 1878	drama	3	n/k	
Two Can Play at That Game	Lyceum	20 May 1878	comedy	1	40	
Daisy's Escape	Lyceum	20 September 1878	comedy	1	31	
Hester's Mystery	Folly	5 June 1880	comedy	1	308	
Bygones	Lyceum	18 September 1880	comedy	1	89	
The Money Spinner	Prince's Theatre, Manchester and St James's	5 November 1880 and 8 January 1881	comedy	2	98	
Imprudence	Folly	27 July 1881	farce	3	54	
Bound to Marry	unperformed		comedy	3		(Note: Alternative titles: The Breadwinners, The Captain.)
The Squire	St James's	29 December 1881	play	3	170	
Girls and Boys	Toole's Theatre	31 October 1882	comedy	3	52	
The Rector	Court	24 March 1883	play	4	16	
Lords and Commons	Haymarket	24 November 1883	comedy	4	70	
The Rocket	Prince of Wales, Liverpool and Gaiety	30 July 1883 and 10 December 1883	farce	3	51	
Low Water	Globe	12 January 1884	comedy	3	7	
The Ironmaster	St James's	17 April 1884	play	4	200	(Note: Adapted from Georges Ohnet's play Le Maître de forges.)
In Chancery	Lyceum, Edinburgh and Gaiety	19 September 1884 and 24 December 1884	farce	3	36	
The Magistrate	Court	21 March 1885	farce	3	363	
Mayfair	St James's	31 October 1885	play	5	53	(Note: Adapted from Sardou's play Maison neuve.)
The Schoolmistress	Court	27 March 1886	farce	3	291	
The Hobby Horse	St James's	25 October 1886	comedy	3	109	
Dandy Dick	Court	27 January 1887	farce	3	262	
Sweet Lavender	Terry's	21 March 1888	comedy	3	684	
The Weaker Sex	Theatre Royal, Manchester and Court	28 September 1888 and 16 March 1889	comedy	3	61	
The Profligate	Garrick	24 April 1889	play	4	129	
The Cabinet Minister	Court	23 April 1890	farce	4	199	
Lady Bountiful	Garrick	7 February 1891	play	4	65	
The Times	Terry's	24 October 1891	comedy	4	155	
The Amazons	Court	7 March 1893	farce	3	114	
The Second Mrs Tanqueray	St James's	27 May 1893	play	4	225	
The Notorious Mrs Ebbsmith	Garrick	13 March 1895	play	4	88	
The Benefit of the Doubt	Comedy	16 October 1895	comedy	3	74	
The Princess and the Butterfly	St James's	29 March 1897	comedy	4	97	
Trelawny of the "Wells"	Court	20 January 1898	comedy	4	135	
The Beauty Stone	Savoy	28 March 1898	opera	3	50	(Note: Written with J. Comyns Carr; music by Arthur Sullivan.)
The Gay Lord Quex	Globe	8 April 1899	comedy	4	300	
Iris	Garrick	21 September 1901	play	5	115	
Letty	Duke of York's	8 October 1903	play	4	64	
A Wife without a Smile	Wyndham's	12 October 1904	farce	3	77	
His House in Order	St James's	1 February 1906	play	4	430	
The Thunderbolt	St James's	9 May 1908	play	4	58	
Mid-Channel	St James's	2 September 1909	play	4	58	
Preserving Mr Panmure	Comedy	19 January 1911	farce	4	99	
The "Mind the Paint" Girl	Duke of York's	17 February 1912	comedy	4	126	
The Widow of Wasdale Head	Duke of York's	14 October 1912	comedy	1	26	
Playgoers	St James's	31 March 1913	comedy	1	70	
The Big Drum	St James's	1 September 1915	play	4	111	
Mr Livermore's Dream	London Coliseum	15 January 1917	sketch	1	12	
The Freaks	New	14 February 1918	comedy	3	51	
Monica's Blue Boy	New	8 April 1918	play	1	38	(Note: Wordless play with music by Frederic Cowen.)
Quick Work	Springfield Mass	17 November 1919	comedy	3		
A Seat in the Park	Winter Garden	21 February 1922	comedy	1	1	
The Enchanted Cottage	Duke of York's	1 March 1922	comedy	3	64	
A Private Room	Little	14 May 1928	play	1	23	
Dr Harmer's Holidays	Shubert Belasco, Washington DC	16 March 1931	play	9		
Child Man	unperformed		farce	3		
A Cold June	Duchess	29 May 1932	comedy	3	19	
Late of Monckford's	unperformed		play	3		

Source: Dawick.

=== Broadway productions ===
The original London productions that were followed by New York productions were: The Money Spinner (New York, 1882); The Squire (1882); Girls and Boys (1883); Lords and Commons (1884); In Chancery (1885); The Magistrate (play) (1885); The Schoolmistress (1886); Dandy Dick (1887); Sweet Lavender (1888); Lady Bountiful (1891); The Cabinet Minister (1892); The Second Mrs Tanqueray (1893); The Amazons (1894); The Notorious Mrs Ebbsmith (1895); The Benefit of the Doubt (1896); The Princess and the Butterfly (1897); Trelawny of the Wells (1898); The Gay Lord Quex (play) (1900); Iris (1902); Letty (1904); A Wife without a Smile (1904); His House in Order (1906); Mid-Channel (1910); Preserving Mr. Panmure (1912); The "Mind the Paint" Girl (1912); and The Enchanted Cottage (1923).

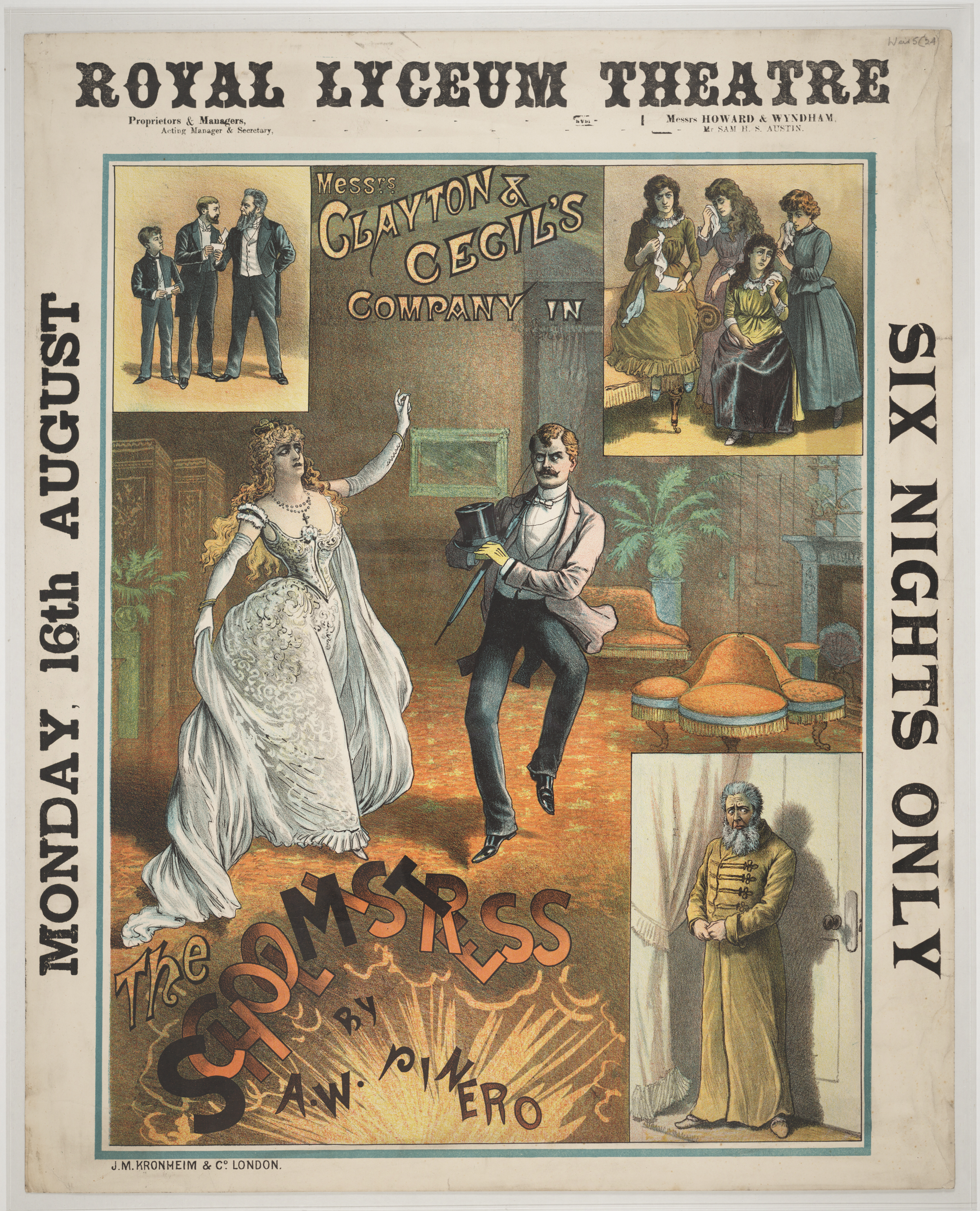
Poster for provincial production of The Schoolmistress

=== Revivals ===
Among the notable British revivals of Pinero plays singled out in John Dawick's 1993 study of the dramatist were:

- The Magistrate: Old Vic, 1959; Chichester Festival and then Cambridge Theatre, London, 1969; National Theatre, 1986
- The Schoolmistress: Royal Exchange Theatre, Manchester, 1979
- Dandy Dick: Mermaid Theatre, London, 1965; Chichester and then the Garrick, London, 1973
- Sweet Lavender: Ambassadors Theatre, London, 1922
- The Cabinet Minister: Royal Exchange, 1987; Albery Theatre, London, 1991
- The Second Mrs Tanqueray: Playhouse Theatre, London, 1922; Haymarket 1950; National Theatre, 1981
- Trelawny of the 'Wells': Old Vic, 1965; Comedy Theatre, London, 1992; National Theatre, 1993
- The Gay Lord Quex (play): Albery, 1975

Source: Dawick.

In 2012 The Times remarked on a revival in interest in Pinero, with new productions of The Second Mrs Tanqueray at the Rose Theatre, The Magistrate at the National Theatre, starring John Lithgow in the title role, Trelawney of the "Wells" at the Donmar, and Dandy Dick, with Patricia Hodge and Nicholas Le Prevost. The paper commented, "Like Terence Rattigan in recent years, Pinero is being dusted down, reappraised and hailed as one of the great British playwrights".

=== Adaptations ===
==== Musicals ====
Four of Pinero's plays have been adapted as musicals: The Magistrate as The Boy (1917) with words by Fred Thompson, Percy Greenbank and Adrian Ross and music by Lionel Monckton and Howard Talbot; In Chancery as Who's Hooper? (1919) with lyrics by Thompson and music by Talbot and Ivor Novello; The Schoolmistress as My Niece (1921) with words by Greenbank and music by Talbot; and Trelawny of the "Wells" as Trelawny (1972), adapted by Aubrey Woods, George Rowell and Julian Slade.

==== Cinema ====
The first of Pinero's works to be filmed was The Second Mrs Tanqueray, in an unauthorised American silent version in 1914, which prompted a successful but not very lucrative lawsuit by the author. With his approval, eight of his plays were adapted for the silent cinema, an authorised version of The Second Mrs Tanqueray (1916) with George Alexander in his first film role, reprising the part he created in 1893; Trelawny of the "Wells" (1916); Sweet Lavender (twice: in 1915 and 1920); Iris (twice: 1916 and as A Slave of Vanity, 1920); The Profligate (1917); The Gay Lord Quex (twice: 1917 and 1919); Mid-Channel (1920); His House in Order (1920) and The Enchanted Cottage (1924).

After the days of silent films there were adaptions of His House in Order (1928) Trelawny of the "Wells" (as The Actress, 1928), The Magistrate (as Those Were the Days, 1934), Dandy Dick (1935), The Enchanted Cottage (1945), and The Second Mrs Tanqueray (1952).

==== Television ====
There have been many adaptations of Pinero's works for broadcasting. Television versions include The Gay Lord Quex (1946, 1953 and 1983, starring respectively Ronald Ward, André Morell and Anton Rogers); The Magistrate (1946, 1951 and 1972, Desmond Walter-Ellis, Richard Goolden and Michael Hordern); Trelawny of the "Wells" (1949, 1971 and 1985, Bransby Williams, Roland Culver, Michael Hordern); Dandy Dick (1948, directed by Athene Seyler) and The Second Mrs Tanqueray starring Elizabeth Sellars (1962).

=== Reputation ===
In 1906, The Times commented:

When Mr. Pinero is at his best we reckon ourselves as close upon the high water mark of theatrical enjoyment. … This or that playwright may show more "heart" than Mr. Pinero or a more delicate subtlety, a third may easily outclass him in intellectual gymnastic, but in his command of the resources of the stage for the legitimate purposes of the stage he is without a rival. As it was said of Euripides that he was τραγικώτατος, the most tragic of the tragic writers, as it might be said of Molière that he was the most comic of comic writers, so it may be said of Mr. Pinero that of all our dramatists to-day he is the most "dramatic". The art of drama is, quintessentially, the art of story-telling, as the sculptors say, "in the round". Mr. Pinero is supreme as a story-teller of that sort. We are always keenly interested in what his people are doing at the moment; we always have the liveliest curiosity about what they are going to do a moment later.

By the time of Pinero's death in 1934 the paper had become less enthusiastic. Both The Times and The Daily Telegraph published polite obituaries that respectfully relegated his works to a bygone era. For twenty years after his death Pinero's reputation remained in what Dawick calls "a state of near-eclipse". From the 1950s onwards interest in his Court farces grew. In a 1972 study of the playwright, Walter Lazenby wrote, "Pinero cannot be outranked as a farceur by any other English writer; not even Shakespeare consistently expended on this form the care and art which went into the Court Theatre farces or achieved such thoroughly satisfying results". Reviewing the book, the academic Robert Ronning agreed that the farces were Pinero's most enduring works:

The fact that students will continue to read The Second Mrs Tanqueray instead of The Magistrate does not mean much except for what they learn about craftsmanship, and this could be learned equally well from the farces. ... While we have seen considerable interest in the field of nineteenth century drama in recent years, one doubts if Pinero's social and problem plays will ever catch on.

In 2012 the director Stephen Unwin wrote:

One of the most heartening developments in recent years has been the critical rehabilitation of the oft-scorned giants of the commercial theatre. Thus Coward has been revealed as an English Chekhov and Rattigan as the supreme explorer of the hidden heart. But neither would have been possible without Pinero, whose surprisingly moving, amazingly theatrical and deeply humane plays still have the power to astonish and delight 100 years after they first created such a stir.

== Notes, references, and sources ==
=== Sources ===
- Dawick, John (1993). Pinero: A Theatrical Life. Niwot: University of Colorado Press. ISBN 978-0-87081-302-3.
- Duncan, Barry (1964). St James's Theatre, Its Strange and Complete History, 1835–1857. London: Barrie and Rockliff. OCLC 979694996.
- Griffin, Penny (1991). Arthur Wing Pinero and Henry Arthur Jones. Basingstoke: Macmillan. OCLC 551340352.
- Lazenby, Walter (1972). Arthur Wing Pinero. New York: Twayne. OCLC 1014871178.
- Parker, John, ed. (1925). Who's Who in the Theatre (fifth ed.). London: Sir Isaac Pitman and Sons. OCLC 10013159.
- Parry, William (2009). "Identity crisis and the search for English opera: the Savoy Theatre in the 1890s". In David Eden; Meinhard Saremba (eds.). The Cambridge Companion to Gilbert and Sullivan. Cambridge: Cambridge University Press. ISBN 978-0-521-88849-3.
- Parry, William (2013). The Beauty Stone. Colchester: Chandos Records. OCLC 887469787.
- Pearson, Hesketh (1922). Modern Men and Mummers. New York: Harcourt, Brace. OCLC 474214741.
- Rollins, Cyril; R. John Witts (1962). The D'Oyly Carte Opera Company in Gilbert and Sullivan Operas: A Record of Productions, 1875–1961. London: Michael Joseph. OCLC 504581419.
- Sullivan, Arthur (1950). Herbert Sullivan; Newman Flower (eds.). Sir Arthur Sullivan: His Life, Letters and Diaries (second ed.). London: Cassell. OCLC 1269235.
