= Lancaster (surname) =

Lancaster is an English surname, derived from the city of Lancaster, Lancashire. Notable people with the surname include:

- Alan Lancaster (1949–2021), English bassist
- Amber Lancaster (born 1980), American actress and model
- Ann Lancaster (1920–1970), English actress
- Benjamin Lancaster (1801–1887), British pharmacist
- Bill Lancaster (aviator) (1898–1933), British aviator
- Bill Lancaster (1947–1997), American screenwriter
- Brandon Lancaster, lead vocalist of Lanco
- Brett Lancaster (born 1979), professional cyclist
- Burt Lancaster (1913–1994), American actor
- Callum Lancaster (born 1996), English rugby league footballer
- Cameron Lancaster (born 1992), English football player
- David Lancaster (disambiguation), multiple people
- Don Lancaster (died 2023), American author and inventor
- Edward Arthur Lancaster (1860–1916), Canadian politician
- Ernie Lancaster (1953–2014), American blues guitarist and songwriter
- Geoffrey Lancaster (born 1954), Australian classical pianist and conductor
- Harry Lancaster (1911–1985), American basketball and baseball coach
- Jack Lancaster, British Rally Driver
- James Lancaster (1554–1618), prominent Elizabethan trader and privateer in India
- James Lancaster, Irish–American actor
- Jane Lancaster, singer of 1983 single "It's a Fine Day"
- Jane Lancaster (anthropologist) (1935–2025)
- Jason Lancaster, American musician
- Joe Lancaster (disambiguation), multiple people
- John Lancaster (disambiguation), multiple people
- Joseph Lancaster (1778–1838), English Quaker and public education innovator
- Joan N. Lancaster, former name of Joan N. Ericksen, American judge (born 1954)
- Kelvin Lancaster (1924–1999), Australian economist
- Les Lancaster (born 1962), professional baseball player in the Major Leagues
- Lilian Lancaster (1852–1939), British creator of anthropomorphic maps
- Lilian Lancaster (1886–1973), artist and teacher
- Louis Lancaster (born 1981), English football coach
- Lydia Lancaster (1683–1761), British Quaker
- Lynne Lancaster, American archeologist
- Mark Lancaster (disambiguation), multiple people
- Marshall Lancaster (born 1974), English actor
- Martin Lancaster (born 1943), American politician
- Nancy Lancaster (1897–1994), 20th-century tastemaker and owner of a British decorating firm
- Osbert Lancaster (1908–1986), English cartoonist, author, art critic and stage designer
- Patricia J. Lancaster, American architect
- Paul Lancaster, American artist
- Penny Lancaster (born 1971), English model
- Richard Lancaster (born 1980), rugby player
- Robert S. Lancaster (1958–2019), American skeptic
- Ron Lancaster (1938–2008), football player, coach and general manager in the CFL
- Roy Lancaster, UK TV gardener, author and plant hunter
- Ryan Lancaster (born 1985), American basketball player
- Sarah Lancaster (born 1980), American actress
- Sophie Lancaster (1986–2007), British murder victim
- Spear Lancaster, American politician
- Stuart Lancaster (born 1969), rugby union coach
- Terence Lancaster (1920–2007), British journalist
- Tyler Lancaster (born 1994), American football player
- William Lancaster, pseudonym for John Byrne Leicester Warren, 3rd Baron De Tabley, poet and author
- William Lancaster (disambiguation), multiple people

== See also ==
- House of Lancaster
- Lancashire (surname)
