= Paul Meritt =

British dramatist and theatre manager

Paul John Meritt (originally Paul John Maetzker; 1843/4 – 7 July 1895) was a British dramatist and theatre manager who produced many sensational dramas.

== Life ==
Meritt was born in Kyiv to British parents; his father, originally from Prague, was naturalized British, and was at one time private secretary to Sir Edward Earle Gascoyne Bulwer. After his father died in 1854, he attended school in Leeds, and was later an office clerk; from 1868 he was a clerk in London.

From the early 1870s he wrote professionally, creating sensational melodramas which were performed at the Royal Grecian Theatre in Shoreditch. In the early 1880s, Meritt and George Augustus Conquest jointly operated the Surrey Theatre and wrote plays together.

His plays brought him success, and made money. Meritt was a member of both the Savage Club and the Dramatic Authors' Society; he was also a friend of leading figures in the theatrical world. He died on 7 July 1895 at his home in Pembroke Square in Kensington, London. Survived by his wife Annie, he was buried at Brompton Cemetery.

== Plays ==
Meritt wrote about 40 pieces, many of which were collaborations, working with George Augustus Conquest, Augustus Harris, Tom Taylor, Henry Spry or Henry Pettitt. About a quarter of his works were published (in Lacy's Acting Edition).

His most successful work was The New Babylon, produced in Manchester in 1878 and at Duke's Theatre in Holborn, London in 1879, where it ran for 361 performances. It was notable for its effects and settings, including a ship collision in mid-Atlantic, and Goodwood racecourse.

Other works included Rough and Ready, produced at the Adelphi Theatre in 1874; Stolen Kisses, produced at the Amphitheatre, Liverpool in 1876; Such is the Law, by Meritt and Tom Taylor, staged at St James's Theatre in 1878; Love or Life, by Meritt and Tom Taylor, staged at the Olympic Theatre in 1878; The Worship of Bacchus, by Meritt and Henry Pettitt, staged in 1879 at the same theatre; and A Pair o' Wings, by Meritt and Edward Righton, staged in 1879 at the Gaiety Theatre, Dublin. The World, written with Augustus Harris and first produced in 1880, was revived in London in 1894, running for 50 performances.
