= Lancashire (disambiguation) =

Lancashire is a county in England.

Lancashire may also refer to:

== Places ==
- Lancashire, Delaware, an unincorporated community in the United States
- Lancashire Road, downhill street in Hong Kong
- Lancashire (UK Parliament constituency), a former constituency
- West Lancashire, a local government district of Lancashire, United Kingdom

== Sport ==
- Lancashire (North), a former regional English rugby union league
- Lancashire Aero Club, the oldest established flying school in the United Kingdom
- Lancashire Amateur League, an English association football league
- Lancashire Combination, a former English football league
- Lancashire County Cricket Club, a major English county club
- Lancashire League, the name of three different sport leagues - cricket, rugby or football
- Lancashire Oaks, a horse race held at Haydock Park Racecourse, Merseyside, England
- Lancashire wrestling, an historic wrestling style from Lancashire in England
- Lancashire Wolverines, a British 'American football' team based in Blackburn, England

== People ==
- Lancashire (surname)

== Other uses ==
- Lancashire cheese, a traditional cheese produced in Lancashire, England
- Lancashire College, an adult education college in Chorley, Lancashire, England
- Lancashire Steel Corporation, a former UK steel producer

== See also ==
- Lancashire Steel F.C., a Zimbabwean football club based in Kwekwe
- Lanarkshire, a county in Scotland
