= Harry Jackson (actor) =

English actor (1836–1885)

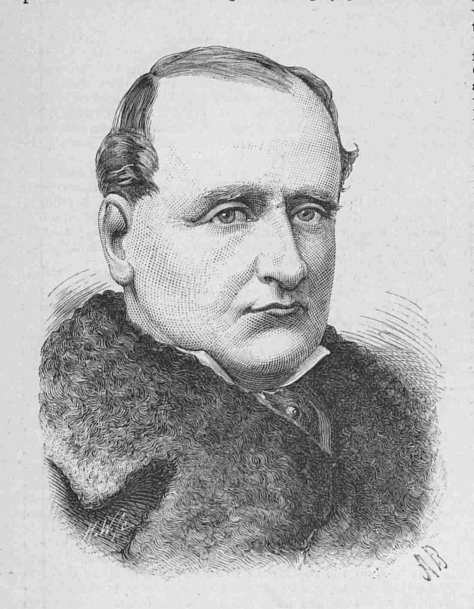
- Jackson in an 1885 illustration
- Born: Henry Jacobson; 1836; London, England
- Died: 13 August 1885 (aged 49); London, England
- Resting place: Willesden Jewish Cemetery
- Occupations: Actor; stage manager
- Spouse: Lydia Ann Jacobson

Henry Jacobson (1836 – 13 August 1885), best known by the stage name Harry Jackson, was an English actor and stage manager.

== Biography ==
=== Early life and career ===
Harry Jackson was born into a Jewish family in London in 1836. At a young age he left England for Australia, where he began his career in the performing arts. During the Australian Gold Rush he played with a company in improvised theatres at the diggings. He subsequently performed alongside Mrs W. H. Foley in Auckland, New Zealand, and in San Francisco between 1856 and 1862.

Around 1870, Jackson relocated to England and took the stage at the Gaiety Theatre in London. He appeared at the Princess's Theatre, where he eventually assumed the role of stage manager. In the late 1870s, he joined the company of Augustus Harris and gained prominence as the leading comedian and stage manager at the Drury Lane Theatre.

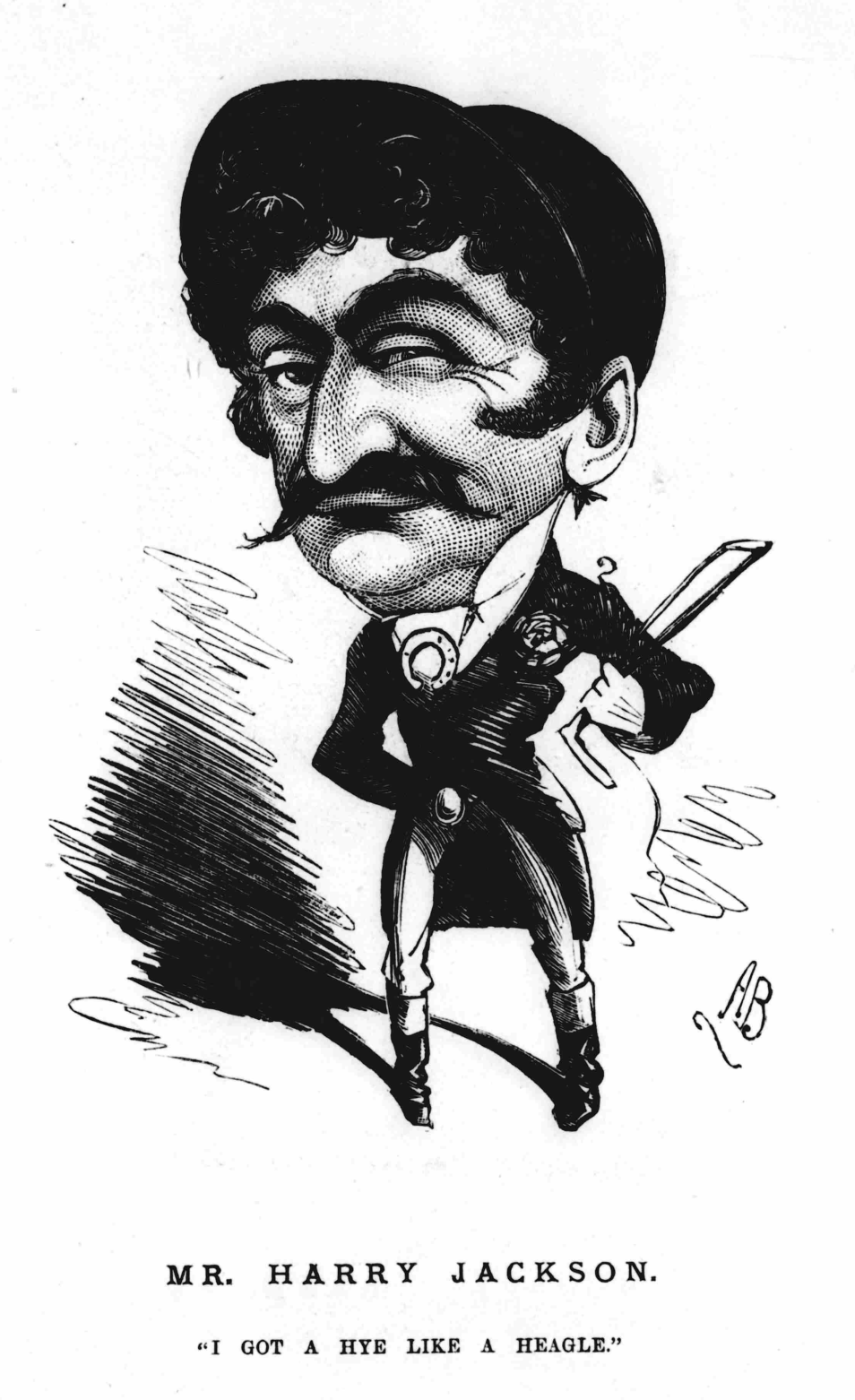
Caricature of Jackson as Isaacs in Queen's Evidence (1878)

Jackson specialized in portraying caricatures of Jews in productions like Queen's Evidence, The World, and Pluck. His portrayal of Napoleon I also received some acclaim, due to his physical resemblance to the historical figure. He directed the Opera Comique during Lotta Crabtree's performances in 1883–84.

=== Death ===
On 12 August 1885, he revived his best known role at the Pavilion Theatre, Whitechapel, that of the "disreputable Jew diamond dealer" Moss Jewell in The World. That night, Jackson reportedly expressed fears about not being permitted to be buried among the Jewish community, given "his identification on the stage with the hideous caricature of a Jew [which] gave great and not unnatural offence to his coreligionists."

He died of a morphine overdose the following evening at his residence at 45 Great Russell Street, Bloomsbury, at the age of 49. A coroner's inquest found no evidence to suggest any suicidal intent. He was buried at Willesden Jewish Cemetery on 19 August.

== Selected roles ==
- Various characters (including impersonations of Edward Kenealy and Napoleon I) in Heads of the People (Drury Lane Theatre, Gaiety Theatre, Globe Theatre, and across England, Scotland, and Ireland)
- Rip Van Winkle in Rip Van Winkle by Dion Boucicault (Gaiety Theatre, 1872)
- Isaacs (alias Jonas Levant) in Queen's Evidence by George Conquest and Henry Pettitt (Surrey Theatre, 1882; Princess's Theatre, 1878)
- Moss Jewell in The World by Paul Meritt, Henry Pettitt, and Augustus Harris (Drury Lane Theatre, 1880; Pavilion Theatre, 1885)
- Larry O'Pheysey in Youth (Drury Lane Theatre, 1881)
- Bevis Marks in Pluck; A Story of £50,000 by Henry Pettitt and Augustus Harris (Drury Lane Theatre, 1882)

== See also ==
- Jewface
