= Lilian Lancaster =

Lilian Lancaster may refer to:

- Lilian Lancaster (cartographer) (1852–1939), British actress and humorous cartographer
- Lilian Lancaster (artist) (1886–1973), her niece, British teacher and artist
