= Clive Gardiner =

British teacher and artist (1891-1960)

Clive Gardiner – self portrait

Alfred Clive Gardiner (3 April 1891 – 15 May 1960) was a British teacher, illustrator, printmaker, painter and designer. An important artist in his own right, Graham Sutherland said of him: "Everything worthwhile I learnt, I learnt from him."

== Early life ==
He was born in Blackburn in Lancashire, the son of Ada née Claydon and the journalist, editor and author Alfred George Gardiner (1865–1946), the editor of The Daily News. Gardiner attended University College School. Aged 16 he went to Paris which inspired his interest in the works of Paul Cézanne and French modern art in general which lead to his interest in Cubism, Futurism and Surrealism. He considered a career in journalism, but instead trained at the Slade School of Fine Art from 1909 to 1912. He attended the Royal Academy Schools from 1913 to 1914. During World War I he served at the Ministry of Munitions. After successfully completing an art teaching course, he became a teacher at the Brighton School of Art and began to draw book illustrations, which included plates for Pillars of Empire: Studies and Impressions (1918), Leaves in the Wind (1918) and Many Furrows (1924). With the encouragement of Pierre Puvis de Chavannes he exhibited for several years at the Royal Academy and the New English Art Club. Gardiner also joioned the New Society of Artists.

== Career ==
In 1918 he was appointed a part-time teacher at Bolt Court Technical School and at Goldsmiths' College School of Art, where he became Acting Warden in 1953 and Headmaster of the Art School (1929–1958). Gardiner is credited with moving the Art School in the direction of 'higher education in art', introducing formal teaching and advancing respect for Impressionism and Modernism. Gardiner taught at the Sir John Cass Technical Institute and was a founder member and later a college principal of the Blackheath Art Society in 1947, with Graham Sutherland as the first President, along with college principals Leonard Daniels, Hebert Matthews and John Mansbridge.

Poster design – Season Tickets Save Time (1928)

In 1924 he gained recognition for the murals he painted for the British Empire Exhibition. He created illustrations for books written by his father and in addition began portrait painting and designed a series of large posters promoting British and Empire products and places. Among his poster designs were 27 for London Transport, many of which were influenced by his interest in Cubism, such as 'Kew Gardens' (1928) and 'The Tower of London' (1927), and Futurism, as shown in his design 'Save Time – Be on Your Way with a Season Ticket' (1928) and 'Season Tickets Save Time' (1928). As a poster artist for Shell Petroleum he took part in the Modern Pictorial Advertising exhibition held at the New Burlington Galleries in London in 1931. In addition, Gardiner designed posters for the Empire Marketing Board (1926–33).

In the years of World War II Gardiner collaborated on the décor and design of the British Restaurants for the Ministry of Food. In his later years he became interested in watercolour painting and small oil landscapes. The Arts Council of Great Britain held a posthumous exhibition of his work in 1963. His pupils including the painter Carel Weight and the designer and typographer Charles Hasler.

== Personal life ==
In 1920 he married Lilian Adelaide Lancaster (1888–1973), an artist and a pupil of Walter Sickert. With her he had two sons, the academic philosopher Patrick Gardiner and the writer and architect Stephen Gardiner.

Clive Gardiner died at St. Stephen's Hospital in Chelsea in 1960. He left an estate valued at £20789 12s. 8d.
