= The Grim Goblin =

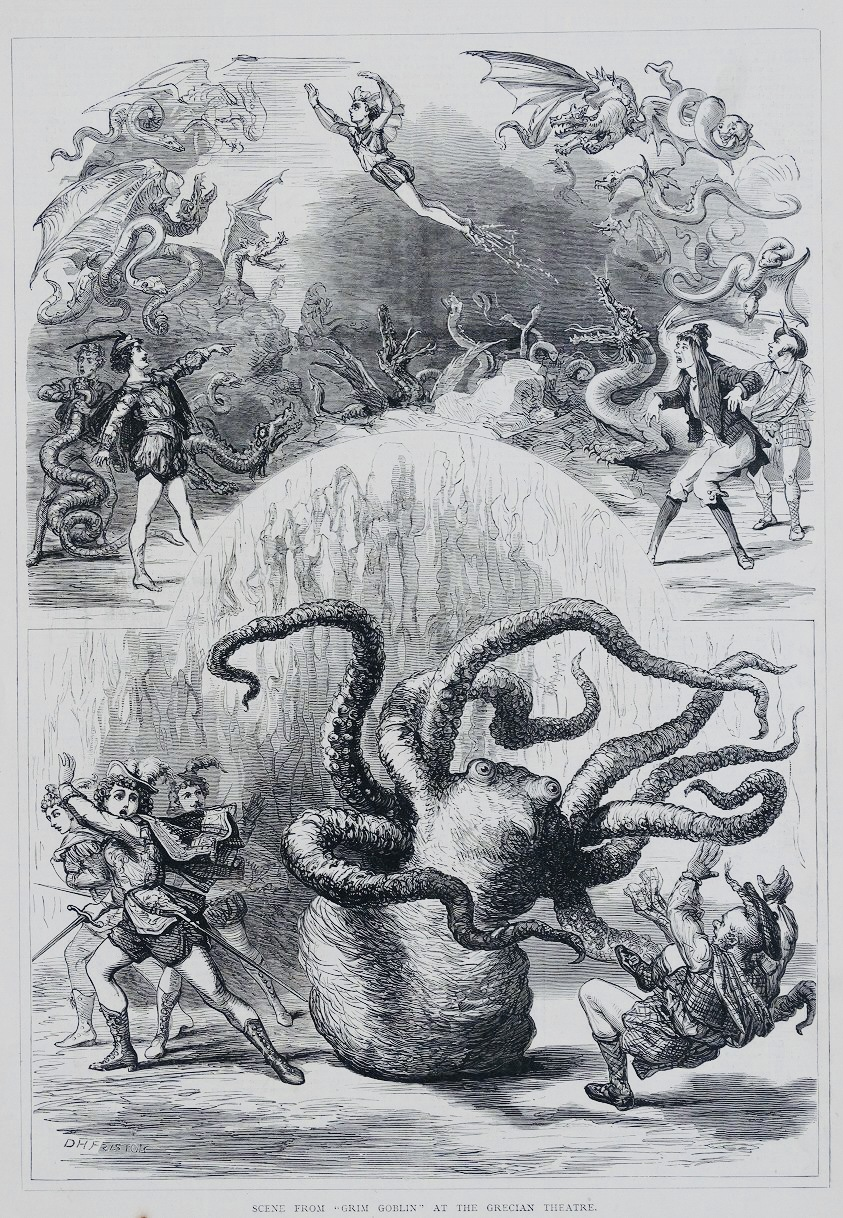
A scene from The Grim Goblin at the Grecian Theatre in London - The Illustrated Sporting and Dramatic News, 30 December 1876, p. 349

The Grim Goblin; or, Harlequin Octopus, the Devil Fish, and the Fairies of the Flowery Dell was a burlesque pantomime first performed at the Royal Grecian Theatre in London in 1876 with George Augustus Conquest and Herbert Campbell in the cast. The pantomime was written by Conquest and Henry Spry while Conquest also directed it. During 1880 the production toured the United States during which Conquest had a serious fall to the stage which ended his acrobatic career.

== Synopsis ==
The story turns on the efforts made to recover the heart of Princess Pearl, carried off by the Goblin. The King and Prince Pert make the journey, but the Grim Goblin has carried the treasure to his stronghold, the Dragon's Dell, where a wonderful phantom fight takes place:

... introducing many entirely new features, and some of the most astounding leaps, dives and flights ever witnessed at the Grecian, where it appears as natural for the human form to be seen flying through the air or projected through the floor, as to assume the ordinary postures of mankind.

Mr. George Conquest fully maintains his old supremacy. The Octopus not only looks like the real thing, but in its movements we trace an exact resemblance. The delicate and complicated machinery by which the 'feelers' of this monster move are exceedingly ingenious, and the most complete command of them is noticeable. Not alone as the Octopus, but as a gigantic Ape, Mr. George Conquest displays his extraordinary ability. The grotesque movements of the animal are so naturally, and at the same time so humorously assumed, that one might fancy Mr. Conquest had spent a greater portion of his life in studying monkey antics.

== Grecian Theatre ==
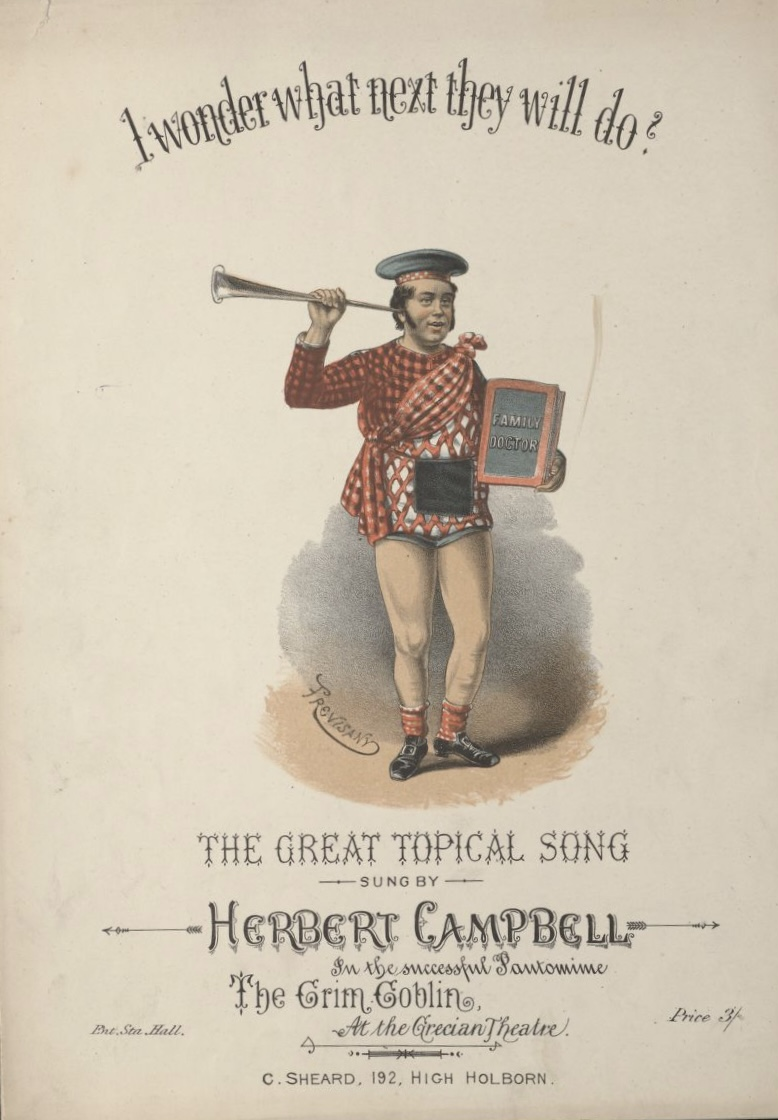
Sheet music cover depicting Herbert Campbell in The Grim Goblin

The production involved George Conquest being 'shot at an angle of forty-five degrees from the mouth of a Dragon onto a trapeze — the most wonderful gymnastic feat ever witnessed ... See George Conquest as the Octopus... the nearest approach to Nature, and a marvel of ingenuity... See George Conquest as the Monkey - a most perfect study from nature.' The Octopus in question, 'Hic-Hac-Hoc', took fifteen men to operate - one for each of the nine arms - and six to move the body. The Octopus (actually a monstrous cuttlefish) was "... frightfully real in its motion about the stage, and is justly considered one of the greatest marvels of property-making ingenuity ever seen in London. The construction and management of the monster is said to be Mr. Conquest's secret..." 'Hic-Hac-Hoc' means "this" in Latin - the nominative singular form of different genders.

== American tour ==
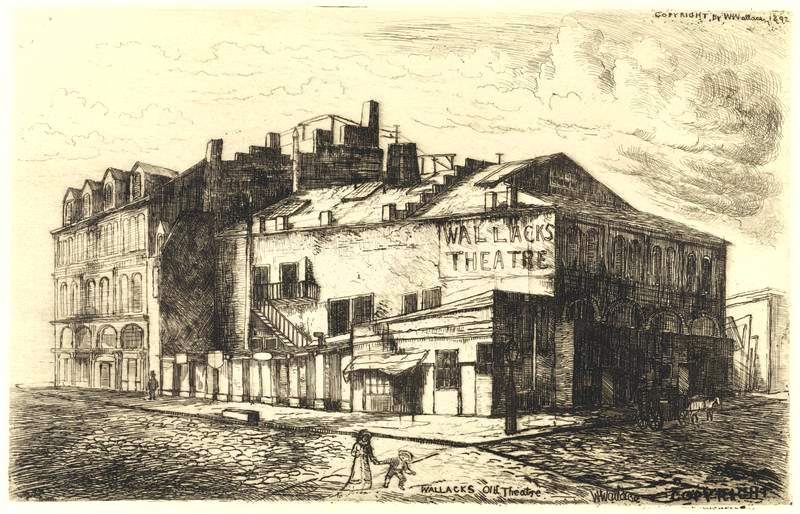
Wallack's Theatre from the rear (1870)

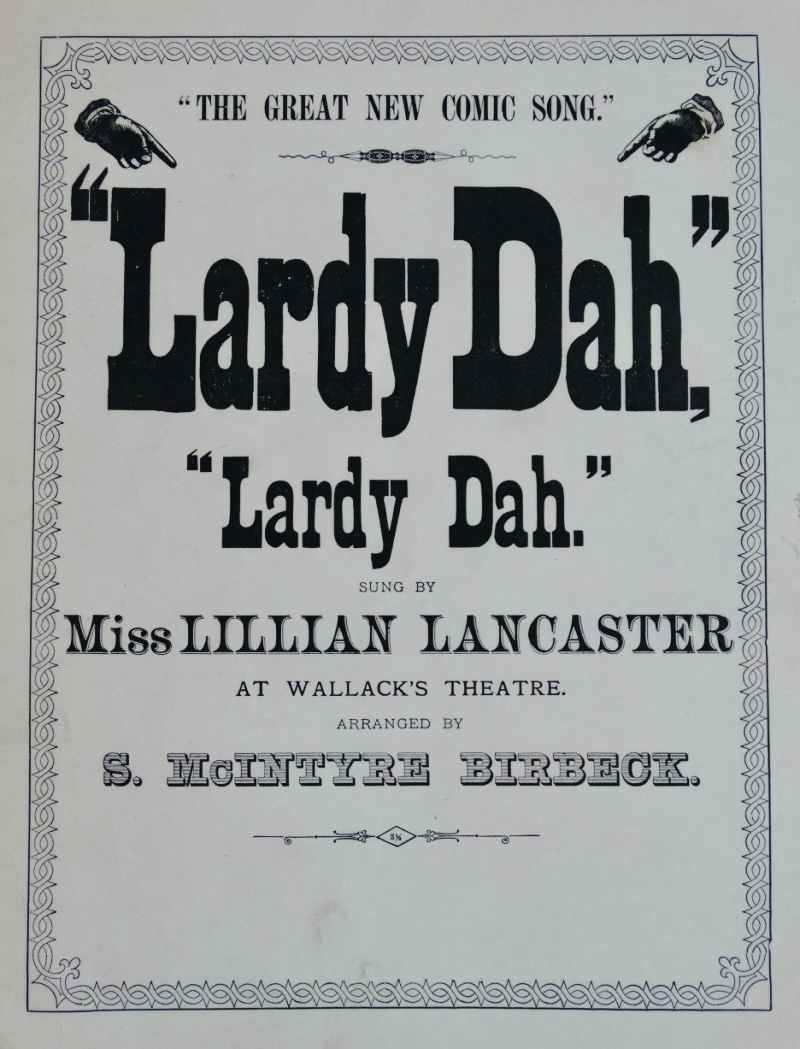
Sheet music of Lilian Lancaster's song 'Lardy Dah, Lardy Dah' from the show

In July 1880 Conquest and his company arrived in the United States to tour The Grim Goblin, opening in New York at Wallack's Theatre on 16 August 1880. During the performance the actress and singer Lilian Lancaster drew outline-portraits of prominent people, and gave a series of lively performances of the comic song, "Lardy dah, Lardy dah!".

The New York Clipper of 14 August 1880 gave details of the production, including the action and cast:

- Wallack's Theatre was opened for a preliminary season Thursday night, when George Conquest, his son George, and his daughter Laura, made their American debut, supported by a company composed of English and American professionals who performed The Grim Goblin, which may be described as a compound of pantomime and burlesque, liberally interlaced with athletic feats and many of those specialties which have made the Conquests famous in England for many years past. The piece is in two acts, and its plot and dialogue are of the flimsiest description... Mr. Conquest displayed rare skill in his make-up for the various characters he assumed, and for his impersonation of the dwarf, as which he seemed to be only about three feet high; for the working of the demon head, which was trunkless and capable of giving a great variety of expression to its features; for the rock-fiend, he being apparently dug out of a solid wall: and as the bat, Geo. Conquest Jr. made a marked success as the giant Tallbones, performing with apparent ease dances and numerous tricks upon concealed stilts.

Miss Laura Conquest, whose chief duties in the burlesque were to sing and look amiable, impersonated "Etheria the flying fairy", who made descents from a raised platform to the stage, swung in mid-air from one side of the stage to the other, and finally disappeared from view by a swift flight from the stage into the flies. The apparatus by which this feat is accomplished has heen described in these columns. Its success upon this occasion, its first performance in America, was hardly up to expectation. Miss Lillian Lancaster, besides singing and dancing, drew outline-portraits of prominent people, among them Gen. Garfield, Gen. Hancock and Dr. Tanner.

== A Serious Accident ==
The show came to an abrupt end on opening night at Wallack's Theatre when George Conquest was seriously injured when he fell during his act, sustaining severe injuries through the breaking of trapeze ropes, caused, the Conquest family stated, through the treachery of a rival.

An account in The New York Clipper stated:

Just before the close of the piece, Mr. Conquest and his son attempted "phantom flights", which terminated in a sad disaster. Mr. Conquest made a diagonal ascent from the stage to the flies where he caught a horizontal bar out of the sight of the audience, and then grasped a rope, by which he was to have been lowered to the stage. The flight was successfully accomplished, but after he had grasped the rope and had descended a few feet it parted, and Mr. Conquest fell a long distance, striking the stage with a heavy thud. Assistance was promptly given, and a well-known physician, who chanced to be in a private box, was speedily at his side. The performances were hurriedly finished, and the curtain fell. During the excitement behind the scenes, and the infux of strangers to learn the result of the accident, many exaggerated reports naturally galned circulation, and among these was one which subsequently found its way into print, to the effect that the broken rope gave evidence of having been cut.

A later investigation, which will hereafter be referred to, proved this report to be utterly untrue. The physician, upon making an examination of Mr. Conquest, found that he had sustained a compound fracture of his left leg. A carriage was summoned and the injured man was quickly driven to his hotel, the Ashland House. A long time must necessarily elapse, under the most favorable circumstances, ere Mr. Conquest can resume his performances; and at the present time it is imposslble to determine whether he will ever be able to do so or not. It was a strange coincidence that his son, who also made a phantom flight, at about the same time, failed to catch the bar above, and fell to the stage. Fortunately, he alighted on his feet, and, being in the presence of the audience, he struck a picturesque attitude, leading them to believe that his accidental fall was a part of the performances. With regard to the broken rope, it was learned that it had been selected by young Mr. Conquest, and that it had been tested before his father attempted to use it by lowering another person much heavier than Mr. Conquest Sr. safely to the stage. Close examination proved that the strength of the rope had been impaired by dry rot. The theatre was closed after the first performances, and the posters announce that the entertainments will be suspended until further notice.

Following the accident the theatre remained closed for two days while the company investigated the cause of the accident and rehearsed a fresh opening, with George Conquest Jr. in his father's part. Although the elder George Conquest eventually recovered from his fractured hip his acrobatic career was over. The pantomime could not go on without him appearing and the public quickly lost interest in it. Cancellations came from the managers of theatres where the production was to tour, and Theodore Moss, who had brought the production to Wallack's, claimed to have lost $10,000. Two days before the pantomime was withdrawn, a similar accident befell Mlle Etheria, the flying fairy - who was actually the young Ada Conquest who, on making her final descent fell to the stage when her wire broke. Another performer attempted to catch her but she hurtled through his arms and, landing on her head, broke her nose and knocked out several teeth, but to reassure the audience that she had not been seriously injured walked to the front of the stage with her brother.

== London cast ==
- Queen Jealousina - Miss M A Victor
- King Boobee - Herbert Campbell
- Grizzlegrief - Harry Nicholls
- Dungrimaw - George Conquest
- Gobble - Mr Vincent
- Hopeful - Harriet Claremont
- The Princess Pearl - Mdlle du Maurier
- Doozedbadd - Alice Denvil
- Wuss-as-Kan-be - Mr Donne
- Karnt-be-nowusser - Mr Flemming
- Longstroke - Mr Digby
- Prince Lardi Dardi - Miss Minnie Inch
- Prince Pert - Miss Lizzie Claremont
- Buttercup - Miss Laura Conquest
- Daisy - Miss Ada Conquest
- Hic-Hac-Hoc - George Conquest

== American cast ==
- Hic-Hac-Hoc, Prince Pigmy, the Dwarf Nix, the demon head, Rokoko the rock-fiend, the Vampire Bat - George Conquest
- Boohbeigh, the 1,000,000th King of Noodledum - M. W. Fiske
- The Widow Grizzlegrief - Harry Allen
- Hopeful, Gobble, Guzzle, the widow's only sons - Miss Maud Stafford, A. W. Matin, Ed. Chapman
- Tallbones, a gentleman of high standing - George Conquest Jr.
- Waspino, a swell demon - Miss Lilian Lancaster
- The Fairy Honeydew, queen of all the bees - Mlle Etheria (Ada Conquest)
- Princess Melodia - Miss Laura Conquest
- Shakeigh Shank, Lord Chamberlain - R. M. Nicholls
- Venomio, Poisano, Agonus, Stingono, body guard to the Queen bee - H. Ricketts, G. Ricketts, W. Elllott, F. Havens
- Reppo, Peppo, Leppo, Zeppo, Sancho, Pedro, saucy pages attached to King Boohbeigh's Court - Miss Elsie Dean, Miss Bessie Temple, Miss Alice Wright, Miss Louise Loring, Miss Susie Parker, Miss Sophie Hummell.

== Synopsis ==
- Scene 1 - The Demon's Den
- Scene 2 - Grizzlegrief's Cottage
- Scene 3 - The Garden of the Palace
- Scene 4 - The Steel Gates
- Scene 5 - Foot of the Mountains. The Journey Begins
- Scene 6 - Golden Cave of the Octopus, or Devil Fish

Grand Ballet of Fiends - arranged by William Ozmond

- Scene 7 - Higher Up the Mountains. The Journey Continued
- Scene 8 - The Monkey Forest
- Scene 9 - The Valley of Sweet Waters
- Scene 10 - The Palace Portal
- Scene 11 - The Dragon's Dell
- Scene 12 - Tapestried Corridor in the Palace
- Scene 13 - The Gorgeous Transformation Scene - Silver Threads Among the Gold

=== Harlequinade ===
- Harlequin - Mr William Ozmond
- Columbines - Miss Barry and Miss Harriet Ozmond
- Clown - Mr Reuben Inch
- Pantaloon - Mr W Ash
- Scene 1 - Butcher, Cheesemonger and Private Dwelling
- Scene 2 - A Farm Yard in Mid-Winter
- Scene 3 - A Shut-up Shop and Police Station. Grand Finale
