= George Conquest =

George Conquest may refer to:

- George Augustus Conquest (1837–1901), British playwright and performer
- (George) Robert Conquest (1917–2015), British-American historian
