= Tim Minton =

American journalist and government official

- Education: Cornell University
- Known for: Journalism

Tim Minton (born April 15, 1957) is an American television journalist, media executive, and government official.

He began a career in journalism writing for The New York Times in college. He served as a news correspondent for over ten years with ABC-7 Eyewitness News in New York City, and later served as the lead investigative reporter at WNBC, the New York City flagship station of the NBC Television Network.

He is the co-founder, and former CEO, of Zazoom Media Group.

He is currently the Communications Director for the Metropolitan Transportation Authority.

He is an 18-time Emmy Award winner.

== Early life ==
Minton grew up in New York City, where he attended the Ethical Culture Fieldston School. His mother was a columnist and contributing editor at Parade magazine in New York, and his father is the president of Mincom, a New York advertising agency. He matriculated to Cornell University, where he graduated with a bachelor's degree. While at Cornell, he began working for The New York Times, publishing several articles in his sophomore year about the admissions process, and other topics.

== Career in Journalism ==
His television career began in 1983 as an investigative reporter with WTVJ in Miami. After 4 years in Miami, he moved to WABC-TV in New York. His tenure with Eyewitness News lasted for 10 years. During this time, he led an investigation into the crash of TWA Flight 800. He also covered the trials of Omar Abdel-Rahman, and other terrorists convicted of plotting to blow up dozens of U.S. jetliners.

In 1998, Minton went to WNBC to serve as the lead investigative reporter for the Greater New York City Area. He served in that role for 12 years, while also contributing to multiple NBC Universal platforms. In 2006, he reported on a facility using electroconvulsive therapy to discipline uncooperative students with developmental disabilities. His investigation, for which he won an Emmy, led to the New York State Board of Regents to ban the practice of electroconvulsive therapy statewide.

Minton investigated a series of construction accidents in New York City that led to the resignation in April 2008 of the Department of Buildings Commissioner, Patricia J. Lancaster. He won an Emmy for this story.

During his career, Minton has worked alongside Chuck Scarborough, Sue Simmons, Len Berman, Brian Williams, Bruce Beck, Al Roker, Jeffrey Lyons and Katie Couric, among others.

In 2011, Minton left WNBC & NBC to start Zazoom Media Group, LLC. Zazoom creates original videos for media, technology and marketing companies. With global distribution, Zazoom’s videos are watched tens of millions of times each month. Zazoom videos can be seen on platforms such as AOL, Yahoo!, MSN, blinkx, and Dailymotion. Minton has served as the CEO of Zazoom Media Group since its founding.

== Career in Government ==
In 2019, Minton was appointed by Governor Andrew Cuomo to serve as Communications Director for the MTA. Minton served under Chairman Pat Foye, alongside transportation executive Andy Byford.

He currently serves in this post under Governor Kathy Hochul and Chairman Janno Lieber.

== Personal life ==
He is married to Linda Saxl Minton. He has two children, Jack and Rachel.

== Pop culture ==
Minton appeared in the 1985 film The Mean Season (starring Kurt Russell). He played a reporter.
