= Great Russell Street =

Street in Bloomsbury, London

Coordinates: 51°31′06″N 0°07′34″W

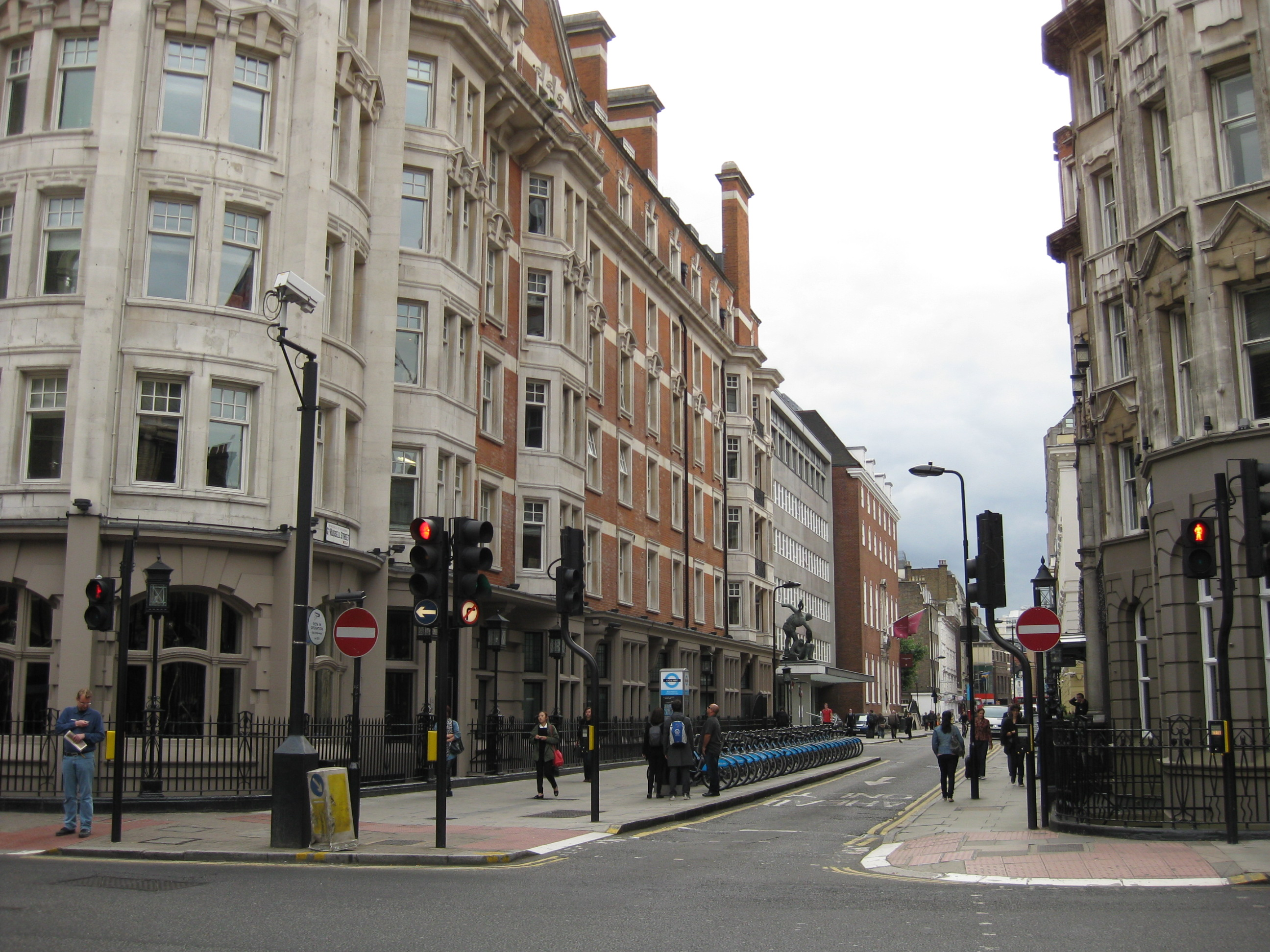
Great Russell Street viewed from its junction with Bloomsbury Street

Great Russell Street is a street in Bloomsbury, London, best known for being the location of the British Museum. It runs between Tottenham Court Road (part of the A400 route) in the west, and Southampton Row (part of the A4200 route) in the east. It is one-way only (eastbound) between its western origin at Tottenham Court Road and Bloomsbury Street.

The headquarters of the Trades Union Congress is located at Nos. 23–28 (Congress House). The street is also the home of the Contemporary Ceramics Centre, the gallery for the Craft Potters Association of Great Britain; as well as the High Commission of Barbados to the United Kingdom. The Queen Mary Hall and YWCA Central Club, built by Sir Edwin Lutyens between 1928 and 1932, was at No 16-22 (it is now a hotel).

== Famous residents ==
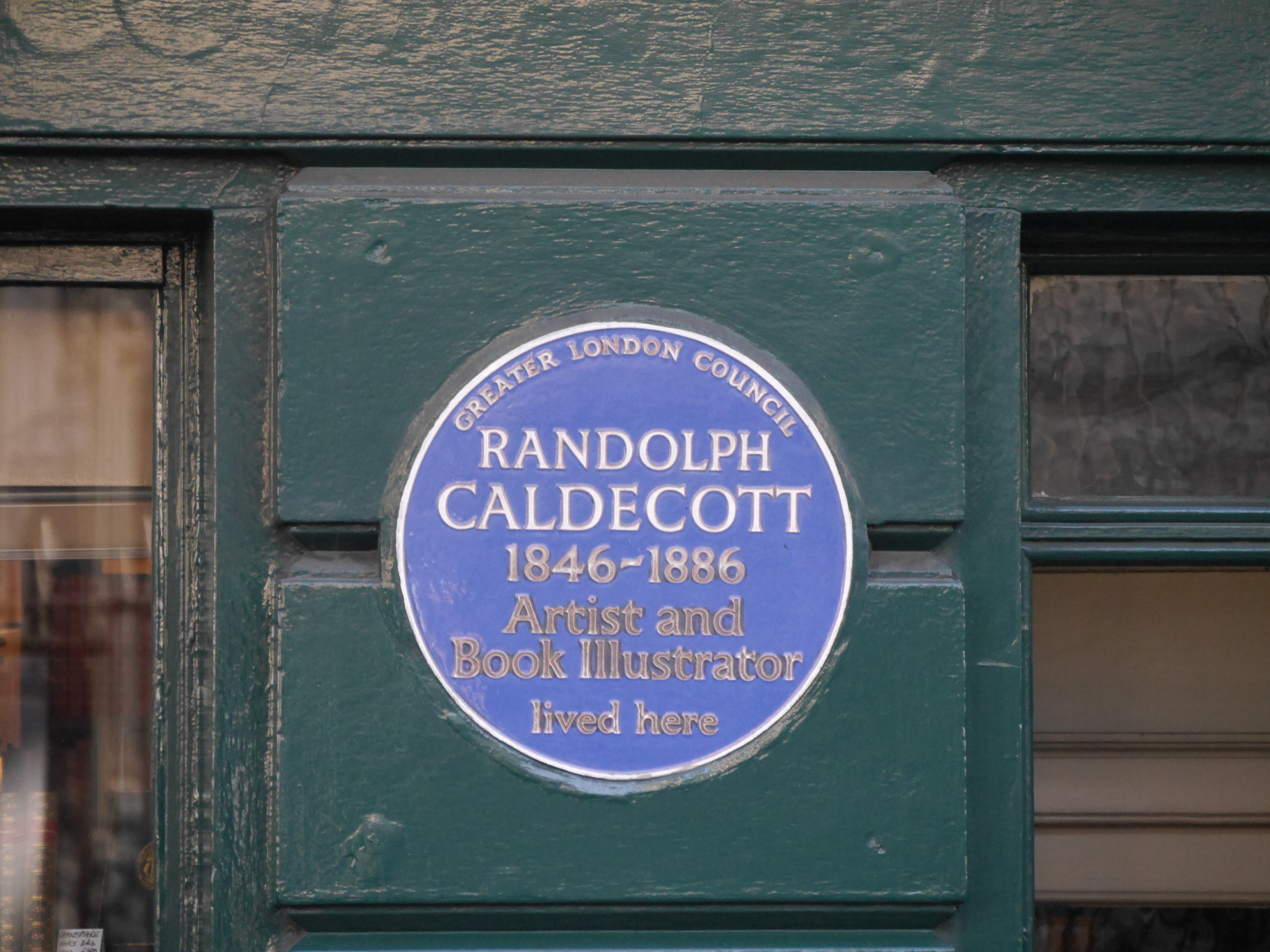
Jarndyce Booksellers, 46 Great Russell Street

Great Russell Street has had a number of notable residents, especially during the Victorian era, including:

- W. H. Davies (1871–1940), poet and writer, lived at No. 14 (1916–22).
- Randolph Caldecott (1846–1886), illustrator, lived at No. 46.
- Thomas Henry Wyatt (1807–1880), architect, lived at No. 77.
- Harry Jackson (1836–1885), actor, lived and died at 45 Great Russell Street.
- D. E. L. Haynes (1913–1994), classical scholar and British Museum curator, lived at No. 89.
- Percy Bysshe Shelley (1792–1822), poet, lodged at No. 119 (February–March 1818).
- John Nash (1752–1835), architect, lived at 66 Great Russell Street, having designed 15–17 Bloomsbury Square and 66–71 Great Russell Street.
- George Brettingham Sowerby II (1812–1884), naturalist who specialised in conchology, lived at 50 Great Russell Street, as written in the front press of the work The Conchological Illustrations, which presents a display of full colour illustrations and declarations according to Carl Linnaeus.

== See also ==
Adjoining streets:

- Bloomsbury Square
- Museum Street

Cultural institutions and sites

- The British Museum
- Faber and Faber, distinguished publisher (e.g., T.S. Eliot's The Waste Land)
- The park and garden in Bloomsbury Square
- Statue of parliamentarian Charles James Fox
- British Study Centres School of English

Nearby:

- The Cartoon Museum
- St. George's church
- Dominion Theatre
