= David Lancaster =

David Lancaster may refer to:

- David Lancaster (filmmaker), American film and television producer
- David Lancaster (writer) (born 1965), Writer and academic
- Dave Lancaster (born 1961), English footballer

== See also ==
- Lancaster (surname)
- Lancaster (disambiguation)
