= Lancashire (surname) =

Lancashire is an English topographical surname, deriving from Lancashire, a county in Northern England.

Notable people with this surname include:

- Geoffrey Lancashire (1933–2004), English scriptwriter
- Olly Lancashire (born 1988), English footballer
- Oswald Lancashire (1857–1934), English sportsman
- Sarah Lancashire (born 1964), English actress
- Thomas Lancashire (born 1985), English middle-distance runner

== See also ==
- Lancaster (surname)
