= Frederick Hartmann =

London-based postcard publisher (1902–1909)

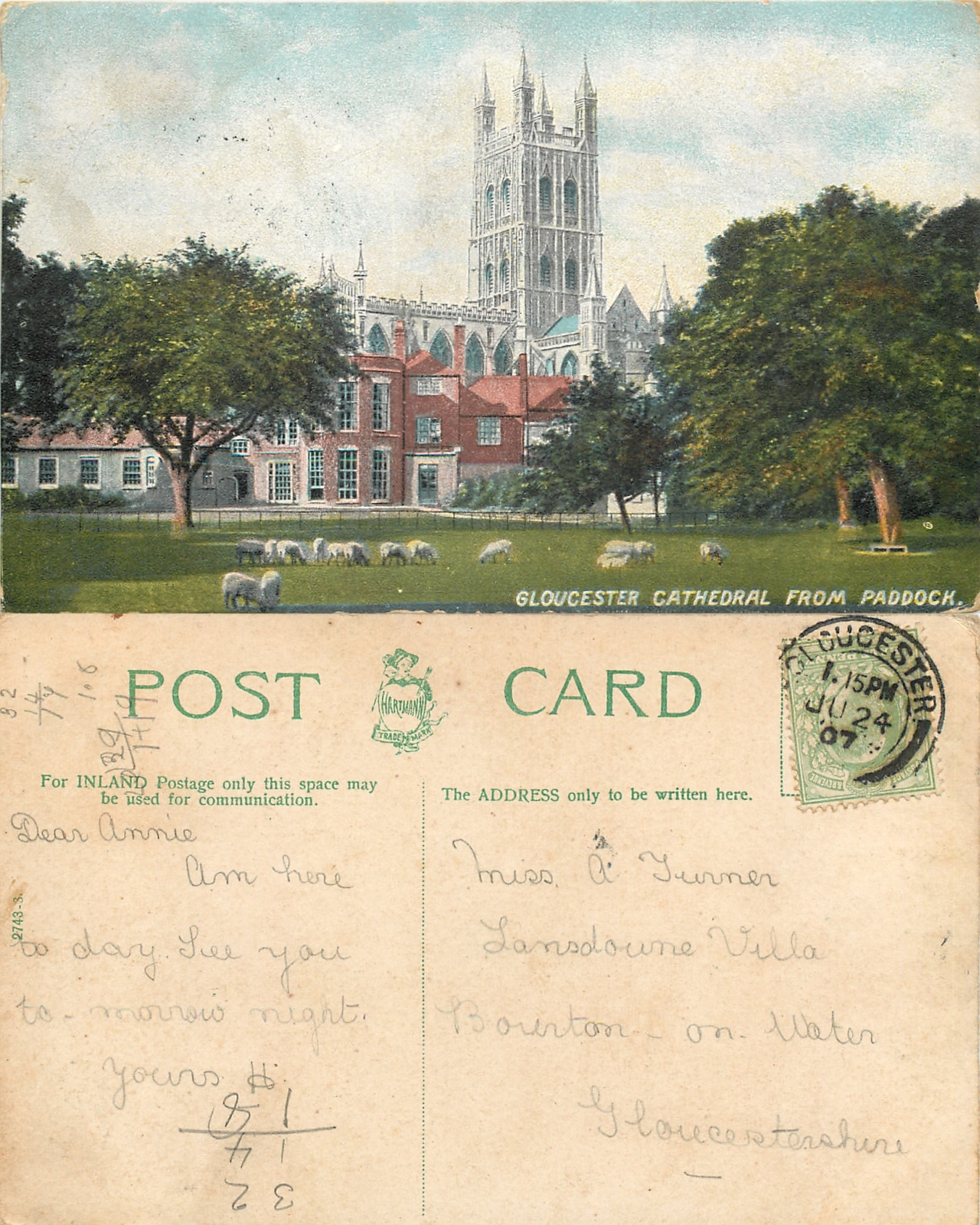
Gloucester Cathedral, Frederick Hartmann postcard, sent 1907

Frederick Hartmann was a London-based postcard publisher, active in the UK from about 1902 to 1909. He was a leading proponent of the "divided back" style, key to its success in England, and may have produced the first divided back card in the world.

Hartmann was based at 45 Farringdon Street, London, and had his cards printed in Saxony (now Germany), which was quite common at the time, due to there being a more advanced printing industry there. Hartmann imported glamour cards from continental Europe and was the distributor in the UK for Trenkler & Company postcards.

In 1907, Hartmann was in partnership with Christian Linck of 13 Werter Road, Putney, and they were trading as "F. Hartmann", fine art publishers, at 45 Farringdon Street. Hartmann was living at 5 Bloomsbury Street. It appears that the business was bankrupt in 1907, and that Linck was also bankrupt on his own account, and that dividends were paid out until 1909.

Christian Linck was born in Germany in 1858/59, was a naturalised British subject, and in 1901 was head clerk for an indigo merchant. Linck was naturalised in 1894, and lived at 13 Werter Road from at least 1892 to at least 1906.

In Jennifer Speake's 2014 Literature of Travel and Exploration: An Encyclopedia, Hartmann is given sole credit for the divided back.

Up to 1902, the back of the postcard could only display the address, and a message had to be squeezed into any margin(s) around the image itself. In 1902, the British postal authorities were the first to allow the now-standard divided back. Other countries quickly followed, although the US quite late in 1907.

F. Hartmann was no longer in business in 1909, and the remaining stock was being sold off by the postcard printer John Thridgould of 14-22 Sidney Street, off Commercial Road East.
