= Patrick Gardiner =

British academic philosopher (1922-1997)

- Born: 17 March 1922; Chelsea, London
- Died: 24 June 1997 (aged 75); Oxford, England

Philosophical work
- Notable works: The Nature of Historical Explanation (1952), Schopenhauer (1963), Kierkegaard (1988)

Patrick Lancaster Gardiner, FBA (17 March 1922 – 24 June 1997) was a British academic philosopher and a Fellow of Magdalen College, Oxford. He was a specialist in the philosophy of history but wrote on a wider array of topics, publishing notable studies of Schopenhauer in 1963 and Kierkegaard in 1988.

== Life and work ==
Gardiner was born in Chelsea, London, on 17 March 1922. His father was Clive Gardiner, a landscape artist and principal of Goldsmiths College; his mother was Lilian Lancaster, an artist and a pupil of Walter Sickert. His paternal grandfather was Alfred George Gardiner, editor of The Daily News. His younger brother was the architect Stephen Gardiner.

Gardiner was educated at home until 1933 when he was enrolled at Westminster School. His contemporaries included Richard Wollheim and David Pears who became fellow philosophers and lifelong friends. As a pupil he displayed, and pursued, a passion for literature and history. He matriculated as Christ Church, Oxford in 1940 where he received a First in history in 1942. (Note: Just as Gardiner had arrived at university, Oxford had begun offering shortened two-year BA courses to students eligible for conscription.)

Almost immediately after he completed his studies, he was called up into the Army and saw active service in North Africa and Italy. After being demobbed in 1945 he returned to Oxford and chose to pursue a second honours course in PPE and then further research which would become his B.Litt. thesis (1950) and his first book, The Nature of Historical Explanation in 1952. His Times obituarist writes that this work "established the concept of an analytic philosophy of history". (Note: For further discussion of this work see Denham (2006) pp.104–109.)

He was appointed as a lecturer to Wadham College, Oxford (1949), and then as a fellow at St Antony's College, Oxford (1952). In 1958, he became a Fellow of Magdalen College, where he remained until he retired as an Emeritus Fellow in 1989. He was elected a Fellow of the British Academy in 1985.

His next (and last) two authored books, Schopenhauer (1963) and Kierkegaard (1988) were described in The Times as "models of how to respect the extremity of an author's thinking without condoning it" that "recaptured a whole philosophical terrain for the sophisticated reader". Christopher Janaway described Gardiner's study of Schopenhauer as "a beacon in the night as far as English-language publications on that philosopher are concerned".

He married Susan Booth (1934–2006) in 1955 and had two daughters.

Gardiner died in Oxford on 24 June 1991.

== Works ==
=== Books ===
- The Nature of Historical Explanation (1952) Oxford University Press.
- Schopenhauer (1963) Penguin Books
- Kierkegaard (1988) Oxford University Press
- The Philosophy of History (Editor, 1974), Oxford Readings in Philosophy
- Nineteenth-century philosophy (Editor, 1969) The Free Press, New York

=== Articles ===
- 'On Assenting to a Moral Principle', Proceedings of the Aristotelian Society, vol. 55 (1954-5), pp. 23–44. JSTOR 4544539
- 'Historical Understanding and the Empiricist Tradition', in Williams, B. and Montefiore, A. eds., British Analytical Philosophy (London, 1966), p. 279
- 'Kierkegaard’s Two Ways' [Dawes Hicks lecture] Proceedings of the British Academy, 54, 1968 (1970) pp. 207–229
- 'Error, Faith and Self-Deception', Proceedings of the Aristotelian Society, vol. 70 (1969–70), pp. 187–200. JSTOR 4544792
- 'German Philosophy and the Rise of Relativism', The Monist, vol. 64 (1981), pp. 138–54. JSTOR 27902688

=== Poetry ===
- Oxford Poetry 1947 (two poems). Edited by Martin Starkie and Roy Macnab. Basil Blackwell, Oxford, 1947.
- Oxford Poetry 1949 (one poem). Edited by Kingsley Amis and James Michie. Basil Blackwell, Oxford, 1949.

== Sources ==
Denham, A. E. (2006). "Patrick Lancaster Gardiner, 1922–1997" (PDF). Proceedings of the British Academy (138): 99–121.
