= Jane Lancaster (anthropologist) =

American anthropologist (1935–2025)

- Born: Laura Jane Beckman Lancaster; December 20, 1935
- Died: August 3, 2025 (aged 89)

Academic background
- Education: Wellesley College (BA); University of California, Berkeley (PhD)
- Thesis: Primate Communication Systems and the Emergence of Human Language (1967)

Academic work
- Discipline: Anthropologist
- Sub-discipline: Primatologist; human evolutionary ecologist; paleoanthropologist
- Institutions: University of New Mexico (1985–2025)
- Notable students: Barbara J. King
- Main interests: Primate social behavior; evolution of human behavior; reproductive biology; parental investment; life history; intelligence; lifespan

Laura Jane Beckman Lancaster (December 20, 1935 – August 3, 2025) was an American anthropologist. She was named a distinguished professor at the University of New Mexico in 2012 and elected to the American Academy of Arts and Sciences in 2021.

== Biography ==
Lancaster was born on December 20, 1935. She obtained a Bachelor of Arts degree from Wellesley College in 1958, where she graduated cum laude. Lancaster received a PhD degree from the University of California, Berkeley in 1967, with the dissertation "Primate Communication Systems and the Emergence of Human Language". At Berkeley, Lancaster was a student of Sherwood Washburn. Before UNM, she held positions at Berkeley from 1964 until 1969, Rutgers University from 1969 until 1972, the University of New Orleans from 1973 until 1977, and the University of Oklahoma from 1977 until 1985. From 1984 until 1985, she was acting Chair of the University of Oklahoma Department of Anthropology. Lancaster taught at the University of New Mexico from 1985, where she was made a Distinguished Professor in 2012. At UNM, her research focused on social behavior of primates, evolution of human behavior, reproductive biology, parental investment, life history, intelligence and lifespan. She was described as a pioneer in the study of human evolution, parenting, biosocial approaches to sexuality and socialization. Lancaster was associate editor of the American Journal of Primatology from 1980 until 1986 and consulting editor from 1986 until 2003. In 1990, she founded the journal Human Nature: An Interdisciplinary Biosocial Perspective. In 2011, she became the editor of the series SpringerBriefs in Human Behavior and Biology, published by Springer. Lancaster had retired as the editor of Human Nature by late May 2020.

Her notable doctoral students include Barbara J. King.

Lancaster's executive positions include: A member of the executive board of the American Anthropological Association from 1978 until 1981, director-at-large of the board of directors of the Social Science Research Council from 1978 until 1979 and a member of its executive board from 1979 until 1981, an elected member of the board of directors of the Society for the Study of Social Biology from 1986 until 1992 and from 1996 until 2002, and an elected council member of the Human Behavior and Evolution Society from 1992 until 1998. She was the president of the Albuquerque chapter of the National Alliance on Mental Illness from 2002 until 2008 and its secretary from 2008. She was the faculty sponsor of the Primate Enrichment Program of the Rio Grande Zoo from 2002.

Lancaster received the Lifetime Career Award for Distinguished Scientific Contributions from the Human Behavior and Evolution Society in 2012. Named in 2012, she was a Senior Fellow of the Robert Wood Johnson Foundation from 2013 until 2016. She was elected to the American Academy of Arts and Sciences in 2021. Her other memberships in associations include the American Association of Physical Anthropologists, the evolutionary anthropology section of the American Anthropological Association (named the Evolutionary Anthropology Society) and the American Association for the Advancement of Science – the two associations where she was a fellow, the American Society of Primatologists, the Human Biology Council, the International Primatological Society, the Society for the Study of Social Biology, and the Human Behavior and Evolution Society.

Lancaster died on August 3, 2025, at the age of 89.

== Selected publications ==
- Lancaster, Jane B.; Hamburg, B. (eds.) (2008). School-Age Pregnancy and Parenthood: Biosocial Perspectives. 2. ed. Transaction Publishers. Piscataway, New Jersey.
- Anderson, G.; Kaplan, H.; Lancaster, J. (2007). Confidence of paternity, divorce, and investment in children by Albuquerque men. Evolution and Human Behavior. 28:1–10.
- Kramer, Karen L.; Lancaster, Jane B. (2010). Motherhood in Cross-Cultural Perspective. Annals of Human Biology.
- Kaplan, Hillard; Lancaster, Jane B. Chimpanzee and Human Intelligence: Life history, diet and the mind. In: Gangestad, Steven W.; Simpson, Jeffry A. (eds.) (2007). The Evolution of the Mind: Fundamental Questions and Controversies. New York, Guilford Press. pp. 111–120.
- Kaplan, Hillard S.; Gurven, Michael; Lancaster, Jane B. Brain Evolution and the Human Adaptive Complex. In: Gangestad, Steven W.; Simpson, Jeffry A. (eds.) (2007). The Evolution of the Mind: Fundamental Questions and Controversies. New York, Guilford Press. pp. 269–279.
- Kaplan, S.; Gangestad, M.; Gurven, M.; Lancaster, J.; Mueller, T.; Robson, A. The Evolution of Diet, Brain and Life History among Primates and Humans. In: Roebroeks, W. (ed.) (2007). Guts and brains: An Integrative Approach to the Hominin Record. Leiden: Leiden University Press. pp. 47–90.
- Kaplan, Hillard S.; Lancaster, Jane B. (2009). Ellison, T.; Gray, P. G. (eds.). The Endocrinology of the Human Adaptive Complex. Endocrinology of Social Relationships. Cambridge, Massachusetts: Harvard University Press. pp. 95–119.
- Kaplan, H. S., Hill, K.; Lancaster, J. B.; Hurtado, A. M. (2000). A Theory of Human Life History Evolution: Diet, Intelligence, and Longevity. Evolutionary Anthropology. 9(4):156–185. Reprinted in: Broughton, J. M.; Cannon, M. D. (eds.) (2009). Evolutionary Ecology and Archaeology: Applications to Problems in Human Evolution and Prehistory. University of Utah Press. pp. 48–81.
- Kaplan, H; Lancaster, J. B. Embodied Capital and Human Evolution. In: Muehlenbein, M. (ed.) (2010). Human Evolutionary Biology. Cambridge: Cambridge University Press.
