= Stephen Gardiner (architect) =

British architect, teacher and writer

Stephen Gardiner OBE (25 April 1924 – 15 February 2007) was a British architect, teacher and writer.

Gardiner was born and raised in Chelsea in London. He was the younger son of Clive Gardiner, painter and principal of Goldsmiths College from 1929 to 1958, and Lilian Lancaster, an artist and a pupil of Walter Sickert. His paternal grandfather was the journalist A. G. Gardiner. His elder brother, Patrick Gardiner, became a professor of philosophy at the University of Oxford.

He was educated at Dulwich College, and served in the Royal Navy from 1942. He studied at the Architectural Association School of Architecture and qualified as an architect in 1948. He then worked for Wells Coates, then for short periods with Richard Blow and Peter Dickinson, and with Maxwell Fry and Jane Drew. He worked with Richard Sheppard from 1951 to 1957, working mainly on schools.

He founded his own practice in 1957, and was in partnership with Christopher Knight in the 1960s. Perhaps his crowning achievement was designing a new house at Stratton Park in Hampshire for Sir John Baring, replacing a late 18th-century house by George Dance with a modern building largely in brick with a steel conservatory. The original building was demolished, but the Tuscan portico was left standing as an architectural feature in front of the house. He also worked on many school buildings in and around London. He became a business partner of Joan Scotson in 1970, who later became his wife. He received the OBE in 2002 for his contribution to community architecture.

Concerned at the precarious nature of his profession, and the number of projects that were never built, he also taught architecture. He taught at the Architectural Association from 1955 to 1956, and at the Oxford School of Architecture (now part of Oxford Brookes University) from 1957 to 1968, at the University of Westminster from 1970 to 1974, at Washington University in St. Louis (Sam Fox School of Design & Visual Arts) in 1978, at Cheltenham College from 1979 to 1981, and at the University of London from 1981 to 1986.

Gardiner was also a writer. He wrote a thriller, Death is an Artist in 1958. He wrote for the London Magazine for 37 years, from 1964 to 2001, and was architectural correspondent for The Observer for 23 years, writing a weekly column from 1970 to 1993. He also wrote for The Spectator, The Times, the Architectural Review, and the RIBA Journal.

He also wrote several books on architectural subjects, including Evolution of the House (1974), a monograph on Le Corbusier (Fontana Modern Masters, 1974), Kuwait: The Making of a City (1984) and The House: Its Origins and Evolution (2002). He wrote two biographies, Epstein: Artist Against the Establishment (1992), and Frink, a life of the sculptor Elisabeth Frink (1997). Le Corbusier was a significant influence on his professional work, and he knew both Jacob Epstein and Elisabeth Frink. He also published poetry, and exhibited paintings and drawings.

He married four times. His first marriage, to Shirley Warwick, second marriage, to Lucy Ward, and third marriage, to Shirley Blomfield, all ended in divorce. He married Joan Scotson in 1979, living on the King's Road in Chelsea until 2002, when they moved to Tunbridge Wells. He died at Pembury in Kent. He had two children.
