= Lilian Lancaster (cartographer) =

British actress and Illustrator (1852–1939)

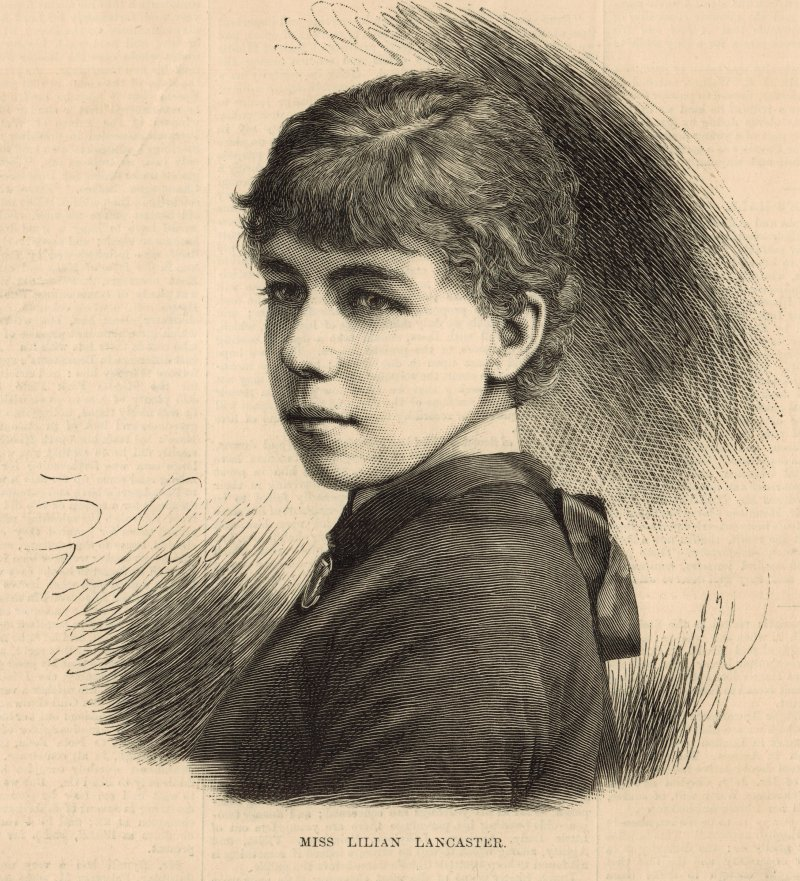
- Born: November 17, 1852; London
- Died: August 1, 1939
- Other names: Eliza Jane Lancaster
- Occupation(s): Cartographer, Illustrator, actress, singer, pantomime
- Notable work: Geographical Fun: Humorous Outlines of Various Countries (illustrated maps), E. L. Hoskyn's Stories of Old (illustrated maps)
- Spouse: William Edward Tennant
- Parents: Thomas Lancaster (1817-1848) (father); Theodora Claudia Lancaster née Crosthwaite (1822-1906) (mother)

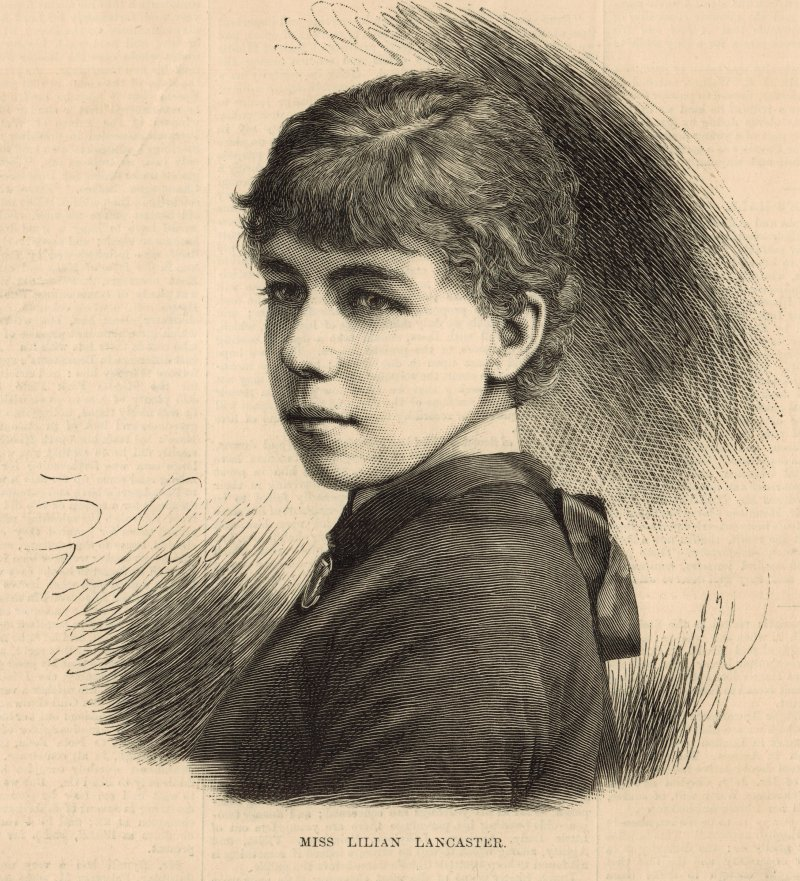
Lilian Lancaster in 1881

Lilian Lancaster (17 November 1852 – 1 August 1939) was a British actress and humorous cartographer, producing anthropomorphic caricatures of maps of European nations with numerous references to the political changes then affecting continental Europe, together with representations of Garibaldi and Bismarck and other figures of the day.

== Early life ==
She was born in London in 1852 as Eliza Jane Lancaster. Her wool merchant father Thomas Lancaster (1817–1848) died before her 4th birthday, and she was brought up by her widowed mother, Theodora Claudia Lancaster née Crosthwaite (1822–1906), a mantle maker, who carried on the family business.

== Cartographer ==
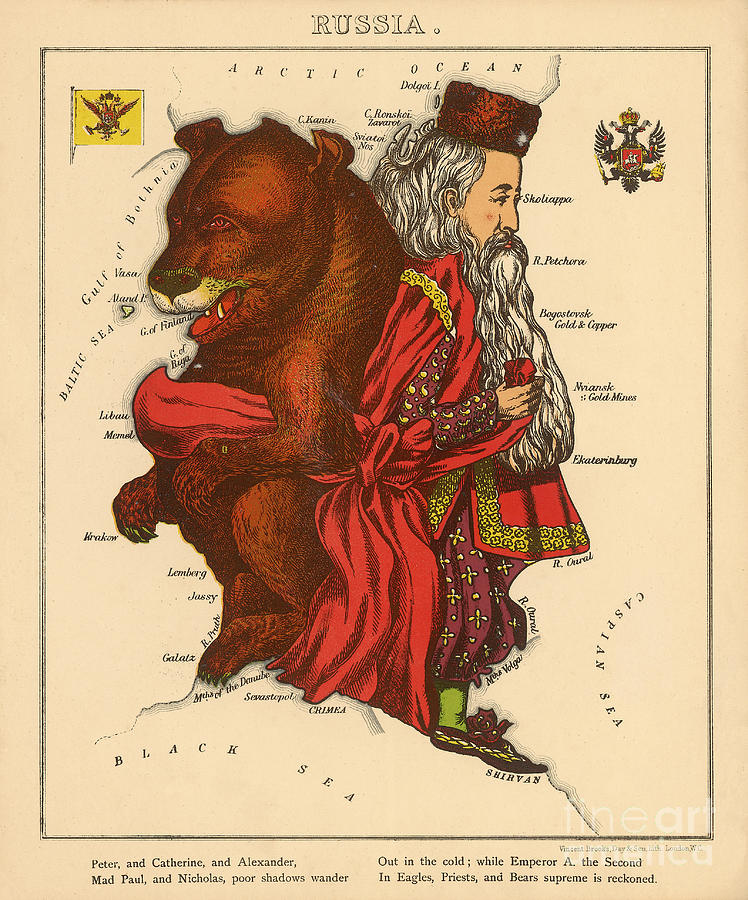
Map of Russia by Lancaster (1868) - Russia, here described as a "Country of Eagles, Priests and Bears supreme" takes on the combined symbolic forms of a brown bear standing back to back with Tsar Alexander II (1818–1881)

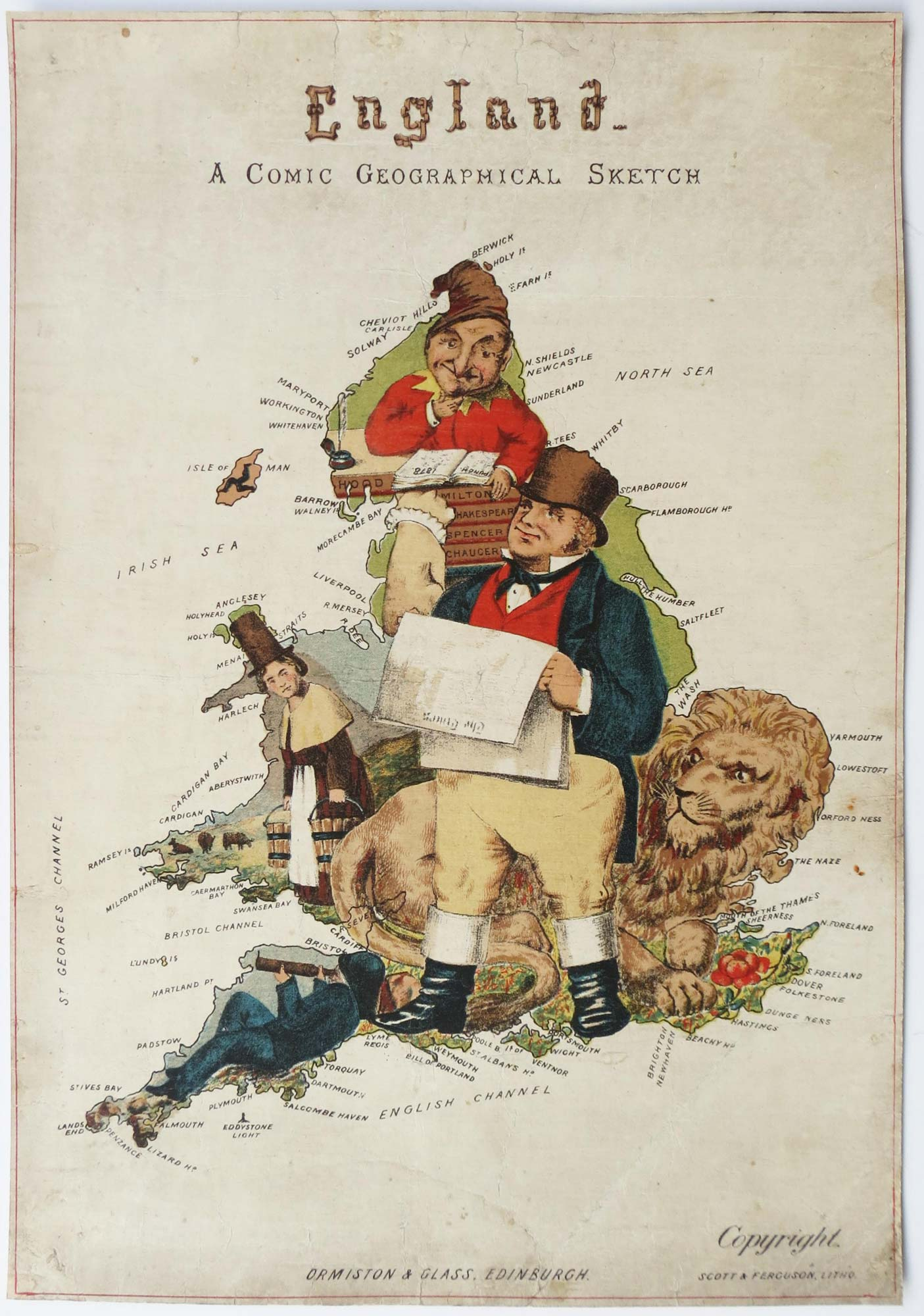
'England. A Comic Geographical Sketch', map by Lancaster featuring John Bull reading The Times, a recumbent lion, Mr Punch and a Welsh woman in her traditional stove-pipe hat (1878)

In 1867, Lancaster was age 15 when she provided twelve color maps for the book Geographical Fun: Humorous Outlines of Various Countries (1868). The maps were created in the style of illustrated caricatures. The introduction to the book and the humorous rhyming verse describing the anthropomorphic maps of European countries were provided by 'Aleph', the nom de plume of the City Press journalist and Islington antiquary, Dr. William Harvey [1796–1873].

In the introduction to the book, Harvey wrote that the maps had been drawn by a girl to amuse her sick brother. Harvey added that Lancaster had been inspired by an earlier drawing of England represented by Punch (from Punch and Judy) riding on a dolphin. The drawings were intended to educate as well as entertain, Harvey adding: 'no history no journal can be understood without a knowledge of maps, and good services is done when we make such information more easy and agreeable'!

Another book illustrated with her maps was E. L. Hoskyn's Stories of Old, again showing European countries, but this time depicting stories from local mythology.

== Theatrical career ==
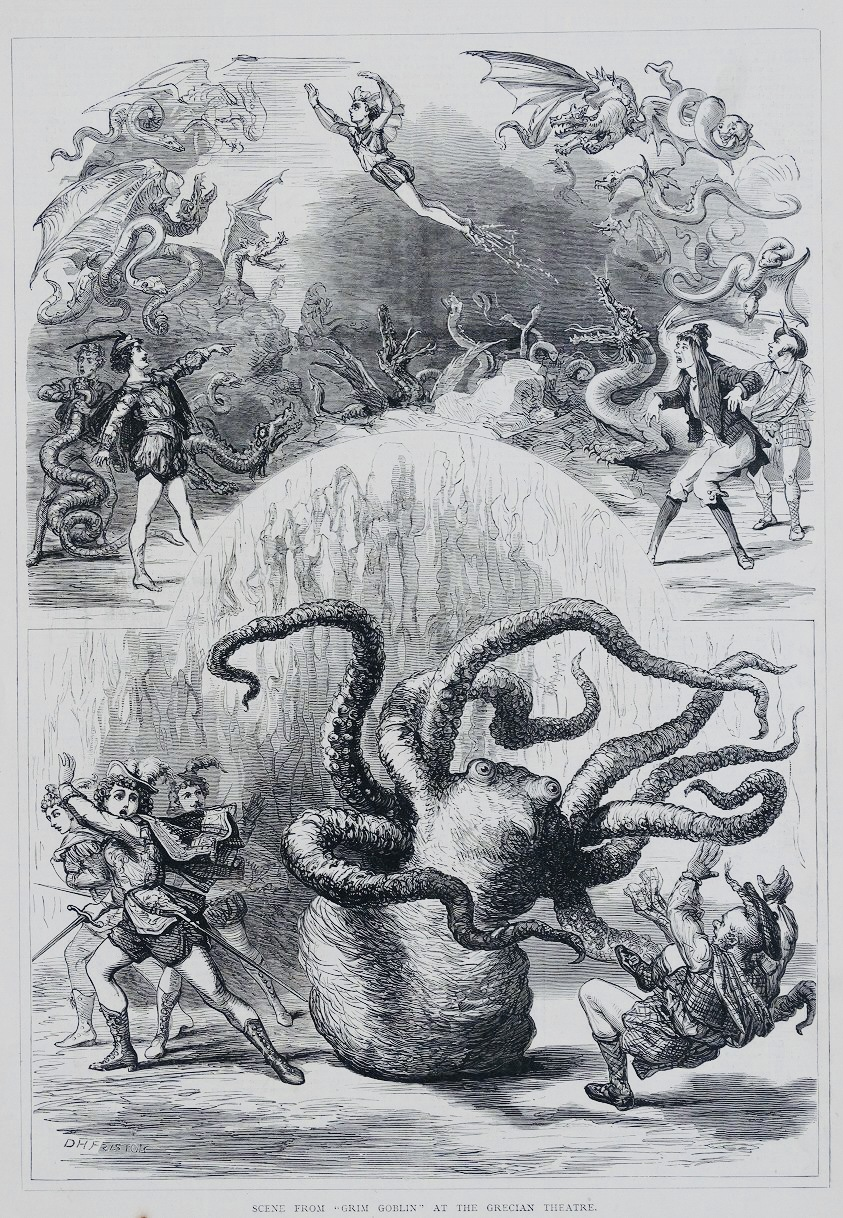
A scene from The Grim Goblin at the Grecian Theatre in London - The Illustrated Sporting and Dramatic News, 30 December 1876, p. 349

Beginning in the early 1870s she commenced a career on the stage as a pantomime performer, comedy actress and singer, at first at the Haymarket Theatre and later at the Grecian Theatre where she appeared as Waspino with George Augustus Conquest’s Grim Goblin Pantomime Company in the burlesque pantomime, The Grim Goblin; or, Harlequin Octopus, the Devil Fish, and the Fairies of the Flowery Dell. In the show Lancaster gave a series of lively performances of the comic song, "Lardy dah, Lardy dah!". During 1880 she was touring the United States with this show when the production came to an abrupt end in New York at Wallack's Theatre when Conquest was seriously injured when he fell during his act.

On her return to Great Britain in 1881 Lancaster toured the provinces in Shakespearean productions with Barry Sullivan.

== Later life ==
In 1884 Lancaster married William Edward Tennant, a London tutor and landed proprietor. With her marriage she retired from the stage. On his death aged 43 in 1897 Lancaster moved to Brighton, where she resumed creating her manuscript caricature maps under her married name.

Her niece was the British artist Lilian Lancaster.

In her latter years Lilian Lancaster Tennant lived at 4 Neville Street in South Kensington in London. She died in August 1939 and left an estate valued at £1445 15s. 6d.

In 2017 two of her hand-painted manuscript maps were displayed in the Sir John Ritblat Gallery at the British Library in London.
