= Benjamin Conquest =

British theatre managers and producers (1803 - 1872)

Benjamin Conquest (3 December 1803 - 5 July 1872), born Benjamin Oliver, was the manager of the Garrick and Grecian Theatres.

== Early life and family ==
Conquest was born Benjamin Oliver 3 December 1803 and baptised on 8 January 1804 He married Clarissa Ann Roxbey née Bennett on the 4th March 1863 and their son was the playwright and manager George Augustus Conquest (1837-1901). George had three sons who were also active in the theatre, George Conquest (1858-1926), Fred Conquest (1871-1941) and Arthur Conquest (1875-1945).

== Career ==
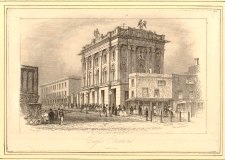
The Eagle Tavern in 1841.

Conquest was the manager of the Garrick Theatre in Leman Street, London. Following the retirement of Thomas Rouse in 1851, he became the proprietor of the Grecian Theatre and Eagle Tavern in the City Road, Hackney, London. The theatre had previously produced light opera and was originally a music hall, but Conquest switched to Shakespeare which was unsuccessful.

He then tried melodrama which was more popular and he produced over 100 such shows written by his son George, often adapted from French productions. George was also an acrobat and pantomimist and produced nearly 50 pantomimes in collaboration with Henry Spry.

The theatre was rebuilt in 1858.

== Death ==
Conquest died at his home in the New North Road, London, on 5 July 1872, aged 68. He is buried at Kensal Green Cemetery in London. George Augustus Conquest inherited the Grecian Theatre.
