= John Lancaster =

John Lancaster may refer to:

- John de Lancaster (MP), Member of Parliament (MP) for Lancashire in 1316
- John Lancaster (died 1424), MP for Suffolk and Norfolk
- John Lancaster (died 1434), MP for Cumberland and Westmorland
- John Lancaster (bishop) (died 1619), 17th-century Anglican Bishop of Waterford and Lismore in Ireland
- John Lancaster (MP) (1816–1884), MP for Wigan
- John Lancaster (writer) (born 1946), British poet and writer
- John Lancaster (Royal Navy officer) (1903–1992)

== See also ==
- Jon Lancaster (born 1988), racing driver
- Jack Lancaster, composer
