= John Lancaster (Royal Navy officer) =

Royal Navy Vice Admiral (1903–1992)

Vice-Admiral Sir John Strike Lancaster, KBE, CB (26 June 1903 – 7 January 1992) was a senior officer in the Royal Navy.

== Early life and education ==
Born on 26 June 1903, John Strike Lancaster was the son of George Henry Lancaster, a marine architect. He attended King Edward VI School in Southampton before entering the Royal Navy in 1921.

== Career ==
Lancaster joined the navy as a special entry paymaster cadet. He spent large stretches of his early career in the Far East, and had one of his arms dragon tattooed.

Lancaster was promoted to the rank of commander in 1940, and in 1941 took up the post of drafting commander of HMS Victory in Portsmouth, where he was responsible for sending supply officers to other posts; he had previously served aboard the cruiser HMS Gloucester, which was shortly afterwards lost in the Battle of Crete along with many of its crew. He went on to serve in the Persian Gulf before the end of the Second World War. In 1946, he was supply officer aboard HMS Ocean which assisted in rescuing survivors of the Corfu Channel incident.

Lancaster was promoted to captain in 1951, and rear-admiral five years later, coinciding with this appointment as rear-admiral personnel, Home Air Command; he was promoted to vice-admiral and appointed director-general of manpower and chief naval supply and secretariat officer in 1959, serving in both posts until 1962, when he retired.

Appointed a Companion of the Order of the Bath in 1958, Lancaster was also appointed a Knight Commander of the Order of the British Empire in 1961. He died on 7 January 1992; his wife, Edith Laurie née Jacobs, had died in 1980, but he was survived by their two daughters.
