= Joe Lancaster =

Joe Lancaster may refer to:

- Joe Lancaster (footballer) (1926–2024), footballer who played for Manchester United and Accrington Stanley
- Joe Lancaster (football trainer) (1926–2015), football trainer and sports journalist who covered such events as the Olympic Games
- Joe Lancaster (musician) (born 1990), metalcore and jazz band member

== See also ==
- Joseph Lancaster (1778–1838), English Quaker and public education innovator
- Joseph B. Lancaster (1790–1856), American lawyer and politician
