= Lancashire League =

Lancashire League may refer to

- Lancashire League (cricket), a cricket competition played for by clubs in the east of the county
- Lancashire League (football), a football competition which existed from 1889 to 1903, and a separate football competition which started in 1939 and which is now played for by non-league clubs reserve sides
- RFL Lancashire League, a rugby league competition which existed from 1895 to 1970
