= Alfred George Gardiner =

English journalist, editor and author (1865–1946)

A. G. Gardiner
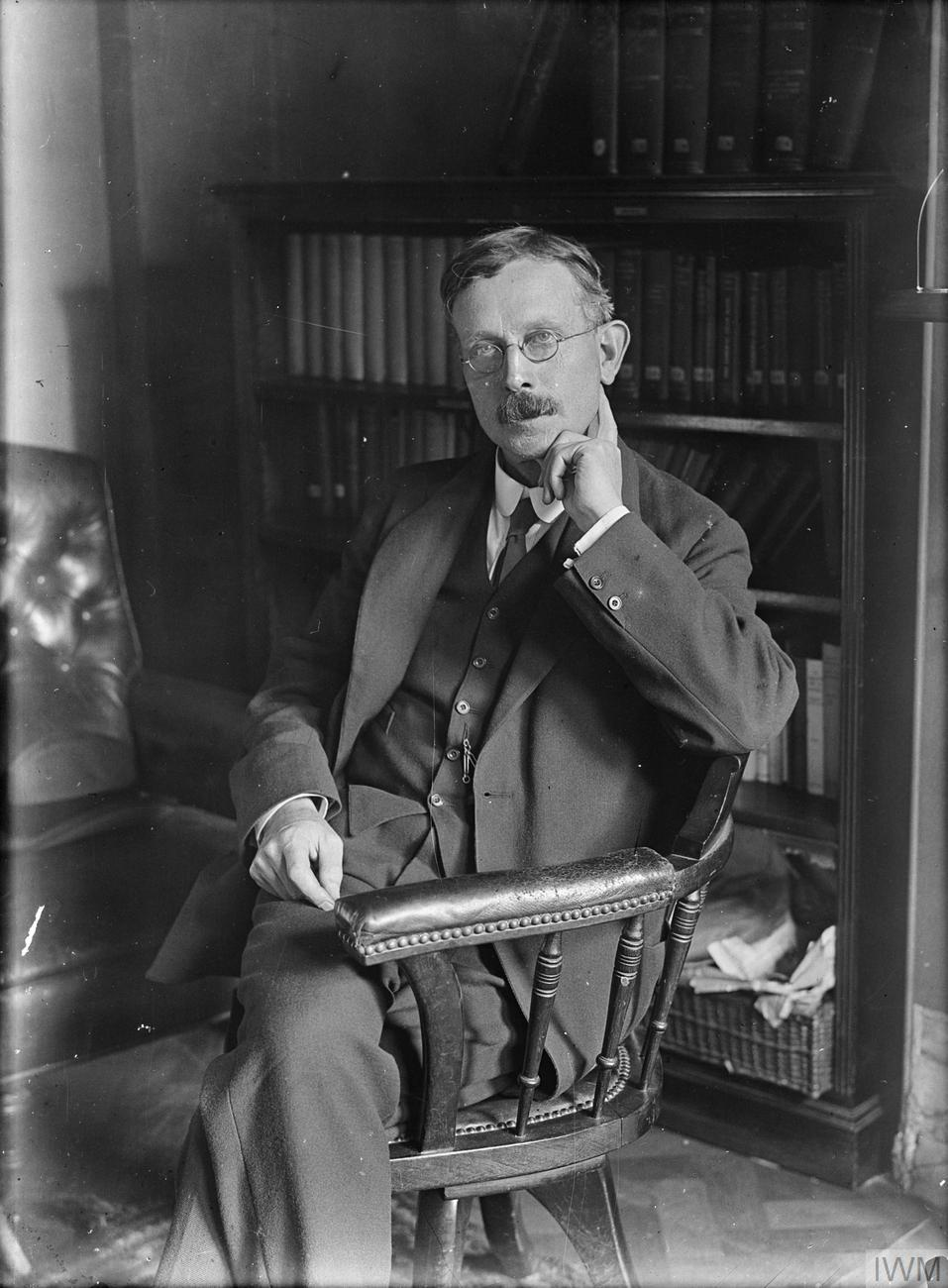
- Born: Alfred George Gardiner; 2 June 1865; Chelmsford, Essex, England
- Died: 3 March 1946 (aged 80); Buckingham, Buckinghamshire, England
- Other name: "Alpha of the Plough"
- Occupations: Journalist, editor, and author
- Spouse: Ada Claydon (m. 1888)

Alfred George Gardiner (2 June 1865 – 3 March 1946) was an English journalist, editor and author. His essays, written under the pseudonym "Alpha of the Plough", are highly regarded. He was also Chairman of the National Anti-Sweating League, an advocacy group which campaigned for a minimum wage in industry.

== Early life ==
Gardiner was born in Chelmsford, the son of Henry James Gardiner, a cabinet-maker and alcoholic, and his wife, Susanna Taylor. As a boy he worked at the Chelmsford Chronicle and the Bournemouth Directory. He joined the Northern Daily Telegraph in 1887 which had been founded the year before by Thomas Purvis Ritzema. In 1899, he was appointed editor of the Blackburn Weekly Telegraph.

== Editor of the Daily News ==
In 1902 Ritzema was named general manager of the Daily News. Needing an editor, he turned to his young protégé to fill the role. The choice soon proved a great success; under Gardiner's direction, it became one of the leading liberal journals of its day, as he improved its coverage of both the news and literary matters while crusading against social injustices. Yet while circulation rose from 80,000 when he joined the paper to 151,000 in 1907 and 400,000 with the introduction of a Manchester edition in 1909, the paper continued to run at a loss.

Though close to the owner of the Daily News, George Cadbury, Gardiner resigned in 1919 over a disagreement with him over Gardiner's opposition to David Lloyd George.

== Essayist ==
From 1915 he contributed to The Star under the pseudonym Alpha of the Plough. At the time The Star had several anonymous essayists whose pseudonyms were the names of stars. Invited to choose the name of a star as a pseudonym he chose the name of the brightest (alpha) star in the constellation "the Plough." His essays are uniformly elegant, graceful and humorous. His uniqueness lay in his ability to teach the basic truths of life in an easy and amusing manner. The collections Pillars of Society, Pebbles on the Shore, Many Furrows and Leaves in the Wind are some of his best-known writings.

A reviewer of Pebbles on the Shore said Gardiner wrote with "fluency, deftness, lightness, grace, and usually a very real sparkle". The end of the essay "The Vanity of Old Age" is typically neat: "For Nature is a cunning nurse. She gives us lollipops all the way, and when the lollipop of hope and the lollipop of achievement are done, she gently inserts in our toothless gums the lollipop of remembrance. And with that pleasant vanity we are soothed to sleep."

== Family ==
With his wife, Ada, Gardiner had six children.

- Stella Mallon, wife of James Joseph Mallon.
- Clive Gardiner, father of Patrick Gardiner and Stephen Gardiner.
- Gwen Gardiner
- Iris Robbins, wife of Lionel Robbins.
- Phyllis Gardiner
- Gilbert Gardiner

== Books ==
- Prophets, Priests and Kings (1908)
- Pillars of Society (1913)
- The War Lords (1915)
- Pebbles on the Shore (writing as "Alpha of the Plough") (1916) ( A later edition, released in 1927 by J. M. Dent, was illustrated by renowned artist, Charles E. Brock.)
- Windfalls (as "Alpha of the Plough") (1920)
- Leaves in the Wind (as "Alpha of the Plough") (1920)
- The Anglo-American Future (1920)
- What I saw in Germany: letters from Germany and Austria (1920)
- Life of George Cadbury (1923)
- The Life of Sir William Harcourt (2 vols.) (1923)
- Many Furrows (as "Alpha of the Plough") (1924)
- John Benn and the Progressive Movement (1925)
- Portraits and Portents (1926)
- Certain People of Importance (as "Alpha of the Plough") (1929)

Media offices
Preceded by R. C. Lehmann	Editor of The Daily News; 1902 - 1920	Succeeded by Stuart Hodgson
