= Lynne Lancaster =

American Roman archaeologist

Prof. Lynne C. Lancaster
- Occupations: Archaeologist, Lecturer

Academic background
- Education: University of Oxford
- Thesis: Concrete Vaulted Construction: Developments in Rome from Nero to Trajan (1995)

Academic work
- Discipline: Classical Archaeology
- Sub-discipline: Roman archaeology, Roman architecture
- Institutions: University of Cincinnati; Ohio University; American Academy in Rome; British School at Rome; Archaeological Institute of America

Lynne C. Lancaster (born 1964) is an American Roman archaeologist specializing in Roman architecture and the topography of Rome.

== Biography ==
Lancaster grew up in LaGrange, Georgia and graduated from LaGrange High school. She undertook her BArch at the Virginia Polytechnic Institute and State University, and her MPhil and DPhil at the University of Oxford. Lancaster was Professor in the Department of Classics and World Religions at Ohio University where she taught from 1997 to 2020 and was chair of the department 2017–18. From 2018 to 2021 Lancaster served as the Andrew W. Mellon Humanities at the American Academy in Rome. She is currently Rawson Visiting Scholar in the Classics Department at University of Cincinnati.

== Awards ==
Lancaster was awarded the Humanities Rome Award by the British School at Rome in 1993–1994. From 2001 to 2001 Lancaster held the Phyllis W. G. Gordan Rome prize fellowship at the American Academy in Rome.

Lancaster received the James R. Wiseman Book Award from the American Institute for Archaeology in 2007 for Concrete Vaulted Construction in Imperial Rome, and from 2010 to 2011 Lancaster held the AIA Joukowsky Lecturership.

== Publications ==
- 2015 - Innovative Vaulting in Architecture of the Roman Empire, 1st to 4th Centuries CE. Cambridge: Cambridge University Press.
- 2012 - A New Vaulting Technique for Baths in Southern Britain: The Anatomy of a Romano-British Invention. Journal of Roman Archaeology 25.1: 419–440.
- 2010 - Parthian Influence on Vaulting in Roman Greece? An Enquiry into Technological Exchange under Hadrian. American Journal of Archaeology 114.3: 447–472.
- 2005 - Concrete Vaulted Construction in Imperial Rome: Innovations in Context. Cambridge: Cambridge University Press.
- 2005 - The Process of Building the Colosseum: the Site, Materials, and Construction Techniques, Journal of Roman Archaeology 18: 57–82.
- 2000 - Building Trajan's Markets II: The Construction Process. American Journal of Archaeology 104: 755–785.
- 1999 - Building Trajan's Column. American Journal of Archaeology 103: 419–439.
- 1998 - Building Trajan's Markets, American Journal of Archaeology 102: 283–308.
- 1998 - Reconstructing the Restorations of the Colosseum after the Fire of 217. Journal Roman Archaeology 11: 146–174.

== Personal life ==
Since 1989, Lancaster has been married to fellow archaeologist and educator, Tom Carpenter, who specializes in Greek iconography and the ancient peoples of South Italy. Together they have traveled the Mediterranean extensively and lived in England and Italy.
