= Oswald Lancashire =

English cricketer (1857–1934)

Oswald Lancashire

Oswald Philip Lancashire (10 December 1857 – 23 July 1934) was an English cricketer who played first-class cricket for Lancashire, Cambridge University and the Marylebone Cricket Club (MCC), plus other amateur sides, between 1878 and 1888. He was also a successful Association football player. He was born at Newton Heath, Manchester and died at West Didsbury, also in Manchester.

Lancashire was educated at Lancing College and at Jesus College, Cambridge. He won a Cambridge Blue for football in 1878, 1879 and 1880, when he captained the team against Oxford University; in all three years, Cambridge won the university match.

As a cricketer where he played as a right-handed batsman, often appearing in the lower middle-order, Lancashire played for both Cambridge University and for the county side of Lancashire in 1878 and 1879 without much success. In 1880, he passed 50 for the first time in making an innings of 60 for Cambridge against the "Gentlemen of England" side in a high-scoring match. He was then awarded his cricket Blue, and in the 1880 University match he made 5 and 29 as a strong Cambridge team beat Oxford by 115 runs. Lancashire was still at Cambridge in 1881 but though he played a few more matches for the university cricket team he did not do well enough to win a second Blue.

After leaving Cambridge, Lancashire continued to play county cricket fairly regularly for the next half dozen years without ever making much of an impact: in 1886, for example, he played in 19 first-class matches, all but one of them for the Lancashire county team, but he averaged only 10.03 with the bat and his highest score that year was just 49. In 1884, he scored 119 for Lancashire in a non-first-class game against Cheshire. But his highest first-class score was an innings of 76 against MCC in 1885, when he was left undefeated when Lancashire won the match by eight wickets. He did not play first-class cricket after the 1888 season.

Unmarried, Lancashire appears to have had no profession or occupation and to have been of "independent means". He was a Justice of the Peace for Lancashire from 1887. He was chairman of Lancashire County Cricket Club from 1913 to 1927 and president in 1923-24.
