= Barbara J. King =

American anthropologist and primatologist

- Born: 18 August 1956 (age 70)

Academic background
- Education: University of Oklahoma (MA/PhD); Douglass College (BA)
- Website: people.wm.edu/~bjking/

Barbara J. King (born 18 August 1956) is professor emerita, retired from the Department of Anthropology at the College of William & Mary where she taught from 1988 to 2015, and was chair of the department of Anthropology.

== Biography ==
Since 2011, King has written weekly for the National Public Radio blog Cosmos and Culture, which explores humans' relationships to each other, their environment, and the planet. Specifically, King focused often on the "inner lives" of intelligent animals like primates, the octopus, squid, pigs, and dolphins, arguing that humanity should consider how best to communicate and accommodate these species' lives without anthropomorphization or exploitation.

King also utilized the blog format to relate personal stories for a general audience, such as her treatment for uterine cancer (2013) and her retirement from active teaching (2015).

King has been a full-time science writer since 2015, publishing stories in Scientific American, book reviews in the Washington Post, and essays in The Atlantic.

A review for Animals’ Best Friends in the American Scientist described King as an "expert on animal cognition and emotion".

== Personal life ==
King is a pescatarian in her personal life, stating that she supplements her "almost-vegetarian" diet with occasional fish. She has also described herself as a "reducetarian".

== Selected publications ==
- The Information Continuum: Evolution of Social Information Transfer in Monkeys, Apes, and Hominids. School of American Research Press, 1994. ISBN 978-0933452398
- The Dynamic Dance: Nonvocal Communication in African Great Apes. Harvard University Press, 2004. ISBN 978-0674015159
- Evolving God: A Provocative View on the Origins of Religion. Doubleday, 2007. ISBN 978-0385511049
- Being with Animals: Why We Are Obsessed with the Furry, Scaly, Feathered Creatures Who Populate Our World. Doubleday, 2010.
- How Animals Grieve. University of Chicago Press, 2013. ISBN 978-0226436944
- "When Animals Mourn", Scientific American, July 2013.
- Personalities on the Plate: The Lives and Minds of Animals We Eat. University of Chicago Press, 2017. ISBN 9780226195186
- Animals' Best Friends: Putting Compassion to Work for Animals in Captivity and in the Wild. University of Chicago Press, 2021.

== Awards ==
- 2018 - World Science Festival Participant
- 2013 - Tack Lecture Series
- 1999-2002 - University Professor for Teaching Excellence, College of William and Mary
- 2002 - Guggenheim Fellowship

== See also ==
- Animal communication
- Body language
- Emotion in animals
