= Bloomsbury Street =

Street in London

Coordinates: 51.51764°N 0.12745°W

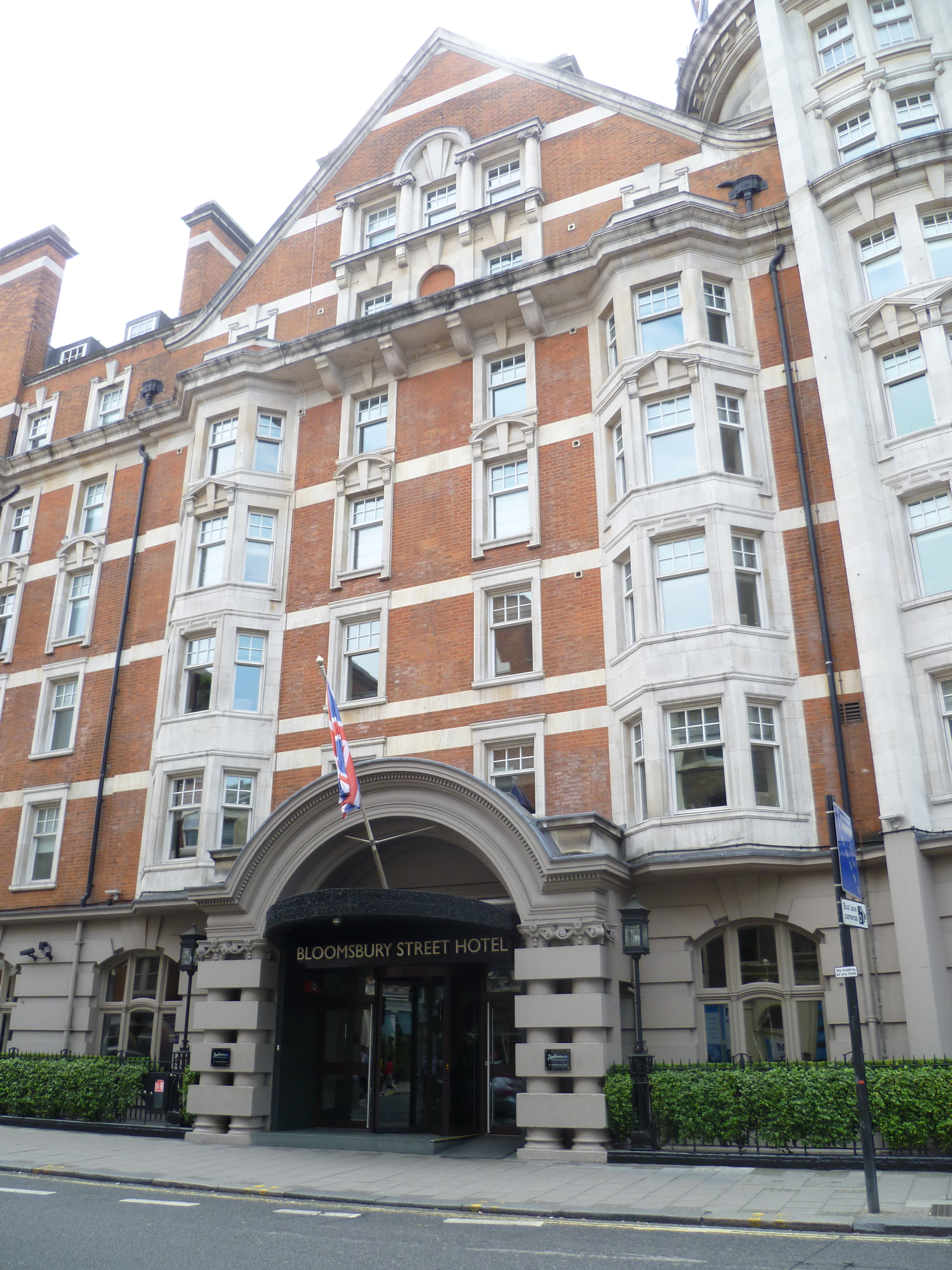
Bloomsbury Street Hotel

Bloomsbury Street is a street in the Bloomsbury district of the London Borough of Camden that runs from Gower Street in the north to the junction of New Oxford Street and Shaftesbury Avenue in the south.

== Listed buildings ==
Bloomsbury Street contains three listed buildings:

- Numbers 1, 3 and 5 at the southern end on the western side.
- Number 10 and attached railings on the eastern side.
- Numbers 24-60 and the attached railings on the eastern side.

== Notable people ==
In 1907, the postcard publisher Frederick Hartmann was living at number 5.
