= William Lancaster =

William Lancaster may refer to:

- William de Lancaster I, or William Fitz Gilbert, was a nobleman of the twelfth century in Northwest England
- William Lancaster (Queen's) (1650–1717), English academic administrator and clergyman
- William Lancaster (anthropologist) (1938–2022), British social anthropologist studying various Arab tribes and communities
- William Lancaster (cricketer) (1873–1938), English cricketer
- William Lancaster (politician) (1841–1929), English politician and benefactor
- William H. Lancaster (1931–2000), member of the California State Assembly
- William Edward Lancaster (1909–2003), chief executive of the Royal Zoological Society of South Australia
- Willie Lancaster, Scottish footballer
- Bill Lancaster (1947–1997), American screenwriter
- Bill Lancaster (aviator) (1898–1933), British aviator
