= David Lancaster (writer) =

British writer and academic (born 1965)

David Lancaster (born 1965) is a writer and academic. He is senior lecturer in journalism at University of Westminster and lives in west London.

== Education ==
In 1987 he obtained a BA Hons in Philosophy and Literature from the University of Warwick, studying under scholars Dr Andrew Benjamin, Dr David Wood (philosopher) and former priest, philosopher and art collector Dr Cyril Barrett.

== Work ==
Lancaster began his career as deputy editor of MotorCycle International magazine, a title founded by publisher Mark Williams, founder of Bike magazine and one-time writer on the International Times.

In 1997 he launched IPC Magazines' food, drink and travel title EatSoup. Contributors included Will Self, Keith Floyd, Tom Conran and Len Deighton. He later moved to become deputy editor of the Times Weekend supplement.

He co-founded Restaurant magazine with its sister World's top 50 Restaurant Awards in 2001. The magazine focused on advice, features and interviews reflecting the growth in the contemporary restaurant industry.

Lancaster has also worked as a researcher, director and script editor on Channel Four and BBC programmes, including Top Gear and Full on Food.

In 2008 he produced and directed a Channel 4/Taste of London film, a tribute to its Icon award winner French chef Joël Robuchon featuring interviews with chefs Tom Aikens, Claude Bosi, Philip Howard and Marcus Wareing.

Lancaster began work in 2009 on a doctoral research proposal into the emergence of the modern celebrity chef. He entered this into London Metropolitan University’s Vice Chancellor’s open competition for a funded PhD course of study, and in the autumn of 2009 began full-time research, based on the proposal.

In August 2010 he was appointed senior lecturer on the University of Westminster's BA Hons Journalism course. From 2009 to 2014 Lancaster was visiting lecturer in media and gastronomy at Regent's College, London.

== Publications ==
In Spring 2009 Lancaster contributed a paper on his grandfather's motorcycling career to the peer-reviewed International Journal of Motorcycle Studies. The same year he presented a paper to the Taste, Hunger and The Media discussion at The Inner World seminar.

Lancaster has contributed regularly to the online moto-lifestyle publication Wheels and Waves formerly and has written for the leading classic motorcycle website, The Vintagent, which is owned and edited by Paul d'Orleans.

In 2014 he wrote "London's Other Café Racer Club" for Michael Lichter and Paul d'Orleans' book Café Racers: Speed, Style and Ton-up Culture, published by the MBI Publishing Company.

And in 2016 Lancaster wrote the introductory essay for the book Wot No Bike? by artist and former The Clash bassist Paul Simonon published by Anomie Publishing. Simonon's motorcycle-themed paintings featured in the book were shown at the ICA in February 2016.
