= Royal Grecian Theatre =

Coordinates: 51°31′41.87″N 0°5′30.6″W

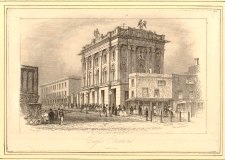
The Eagle Tavern in 1841.

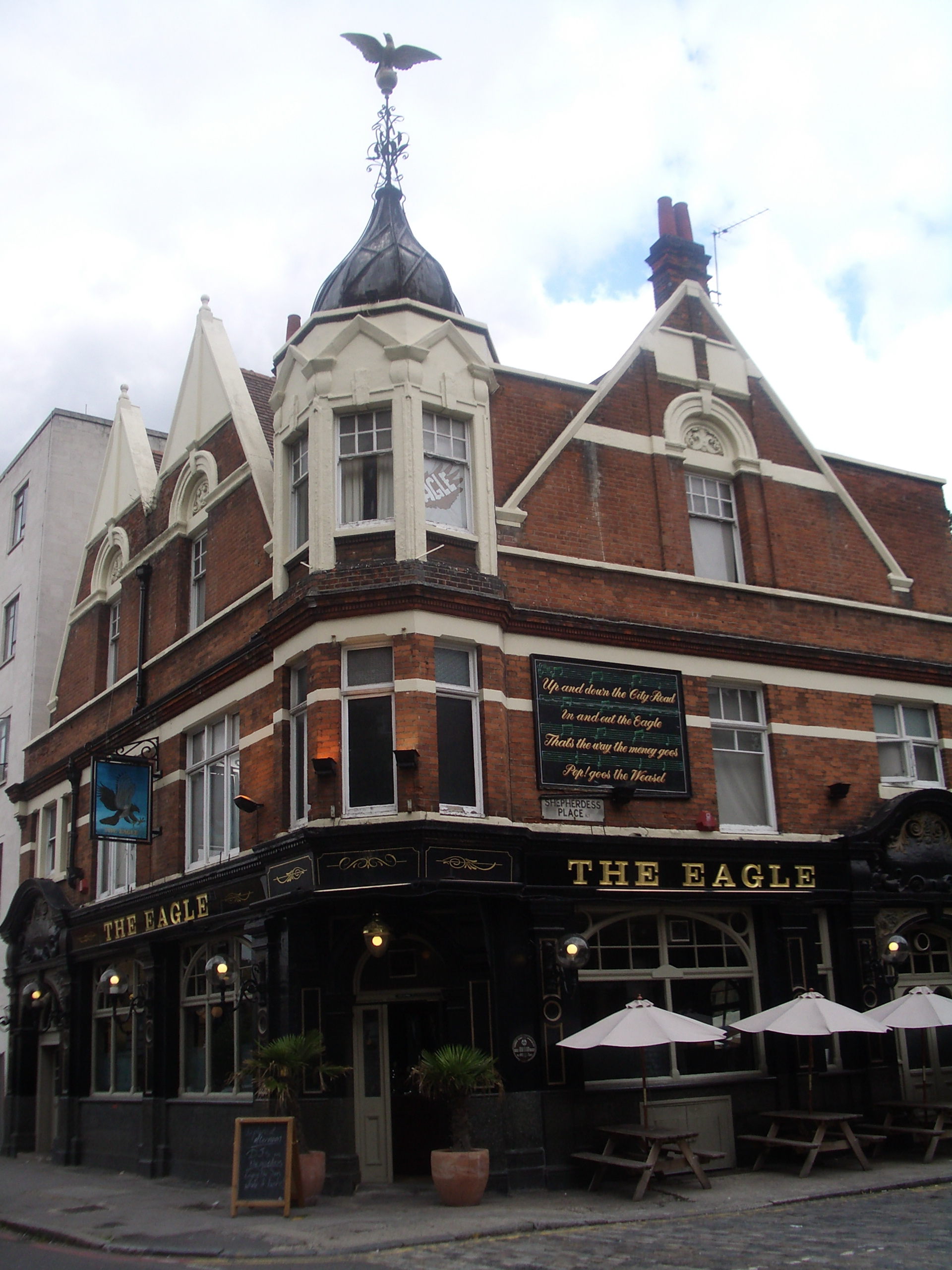
The Eagle, just off the City Road, Shoreditch, London, displaying the nursery rhyme line about the pub's predecessor

The Royal Grecian Theatre was a music hall theatre, located in the grounds of the Eagle Tavern, a public house at Shepherdess Walk, just off the City Road in Shoreditch, in the East End of London. The Eagle, best known for its association with the nursery rhyme Pop goes the weasel survives (albeit rebuilt), but the theatre does not.

== Establishment and enhancements ==
The Shepherd and Shepherdess tavern had been built at the site sometime prior to 1745, in what was then a rural part of the parish of Shoreditch. Invalids would stay at the tavern to benefit from the pure country air. The tavern was popular for cream cakes and furmety. Shepherdess Walk is likely to take its name from the old tavern. the tavern was demolished in the 1820s.

The Eagle Tavern was built on the site in the 1820s, and in 1832 a pavilion, known as the Grecian Saloon, was built in its grounds. The saloon was rebuilt in 1841, becoming a theatre proper. It received a licence in 1858, and became the Royal Grecian. Alterations in 1858 made it a 2500-seat theatre. In 1877 a new 4000-seat theatre was built on the site of the old ballroom.

The Eagle's influence on the Music Hall genre was profound, being described as:

The father and mother, the dry and wet nurse of Music Hall

— John Hollingshead, journalist and theatrical manager,

== Demolition of theatre and rebuild of the Eagle ==
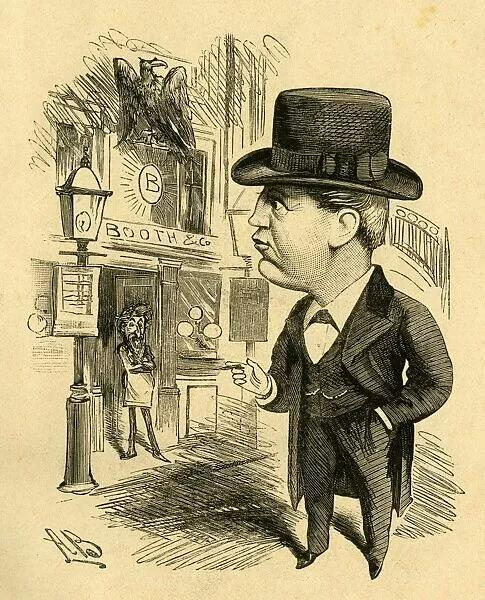
"I wonder if I shall ever be back there!" - George Conquest looking across at the Eagle Tavern, also known as the Grecian Theatre, bought as Salvation Army premises in 1882. William Booth stands in the doorway - Alfred Bryan in Entr'acte (1883)

In 1882 the buildings were put up for auction by the owner, T. G. Clark, who had in turn purchased it from George Conquest in 1879. The premises were bought by the Salvation Army. The theatre was demolished in 1900 and the Eagle rebuilt. The Eagle pub, which is still in business.

== Theatre operations ==
=== Performers ===
Marie Lloyd, known as the Queen of the Music Hall, worked at the Eagle as a waitress at the age of 15. Her father John who was a waiter there also secured her an unpaid role as a table singer at the venue.

=== Ownership and artistic directorship ===
In 1851 Benjamin Conquest became proprietor. The musical directorship of the Grecian changed hands in 1870, general musical director William Edroff died leaving his son Andrew to direct the bands in the ballroom and on the outdoor platform. Edward Barrett, however had been the leader of the theatre orchestra. Barrett's son Oscar took over music for the dramas and pantomimes in 1870.

== Popular culture ==
=== Nursery rhyme ===
The nursery rhyme Pop Goes the Weasel refers to the old tavern:

Up and down the City road,
In and out the Eagle,
That’s the way the money goes,
Pop goes the weasel.

=== Literature ===
The pub features in Charles Dickens Sketches by Boz, when the Eagle is visited by Jemima Evans and Samuel Wilkins.
