= Lilian Lancaster (artist) =

British teacher and artist (1886–1973)

Lilian Lancaster - self portrait (1920s)

Lilian Adelaide Lancaster (5 October 1886 – 3 June 1973) was a British teacher and artist and a former pupil of Walter Sickert.

== Early life and education ==
She was born in Chiswick in London in 1886, one of two daughters of Margaret, an Irish comedienne, and William James Lancaster, a theatrical manager. Her older sister, Theodora Margaret Sothern Lancaster (1885-1977) married the sculptor Edmund Thomas Wyatt Ware (1883-1960). Her aunt, after whom she was named, was the actress and humorous cartographer Lilian Lancaster. Primarily a figure and still-life painter, Lancaster studied at the Westminster School of Art 1908-1911 where her Teacher was Walter Sickert and the Slade School of Fine Art (1909-1910) where her teachers included Henry Tonks and Frederick Brown. Her son, the architect Stephen Gardiner later recalled that his mother was Sickert's favourite pupil, and that he gifted her one of his paintings, Reverie, a half-length nude on a bed, painted during his Camden Town period. She was influenced by the French Impressionists, with Renoir being a particular influence on her own work, and by the works of Vincent van Gogh.

== Career ==
Lilian Lancaster taught at Brighton School of Art and Eastbourne College of Art from 1916 to 1921. From 1911 to 1966 she exhibited her paintings in London, including at the Royal Academy Summer Exhibition and at the New English Art Club. Lilian had two major solo exhibition's in London and was a member of the WIAC. She also exhibited her work internationally in Paris Salon's and by invitation in Berlin. Her paintings received excellent reviews in contemporary newspapers and art periodicals.

In 1912, Lilian held a solo exhibition at the Doré Gallery at the beginning of her artistic career, Anthony Ludovici wrote of her work:

... Wonderfully able as "A Blonde" (No. 12) undoubtedly is, sound and faithful as are "Moi-meme" (NO. 15), "Barbara in Yellow" (No. z), "The Japanese Screen" (No. 16) and "Gold and Blue" (No 7), I have the feeling that in all these pictures Miss Lancaster is exhibiting more virtuosity than taste, more good schooling - than discrimination. And I say this in no carping spirit; for let me remind the artist that her earnestness both captivated and infected me, and I am doing my utmost to give her an earnest criticism. It is when you turn from "Embroidress" (No. 10) to a "Painting from the Antique" (No. 13) – a telltale juxtaposition, by-the-bye!– that you realise on the one hand wherein Miss Lancaster is incomplete, subservient and still diffident, and on the other wherein she is mistress, unhesitating and brilliant. No. 10 is a disorderly jumble, pretentious in its composition, deceptive through its complexity, and almost pre-Raphaelite in its humble prostration before insiignificant and disturbing detail. No. 14, on the contrary, is orderly, it is modest, tasteful and straightforward; but then half its beauty is borrowed beauty, almost all its charm comes from the inspired mastery of the ancient sculptor. Nevertheless, the borrowed beauty is splendidly rendered.

Her work can be found in various private and public collections, including the Grundy Art Gallery in Blackpool.

== Personal life ==
In 1920 she married the artist Clive Gardiner With him she had two sons, the academic philosopher Patrick Gardiner and the writer and architect Stephen Gardiner.

In 1960, after the death of her husband, she moved to the Dower House in Wytham in Oxfordshire.

Lilian Adelaide Gardiner died in 1973.
