= Henry Spry =

Henry Thomas Augustus Spry (bapt. 2 July 1834 – 17 February 1904) was an English playwright and pantomime performer who co-wrote and appeared in nearly 50 productions with George Conquest at the Surrey Theatre and elsewhere.

== Early life ==
Henry Spry was born in 1834 in Bloomsbury, London to Charles and Sarah Maria Spry.

== Family ==
Spry married Eliza Sarah Hassan in 1859. Their daughter Alice was an actress.

== Career ==
Spry was a playwright and pantomime performer who co-wrote and appeared in nearly 50 productions with George Conquest at the Surrey Theatre and elsewhere.

He died in 1904 in Islington, aged 69.

== Works with George Conquest ==
- Spitz-Spitz the Spider Crab; or The Pirate of Spitsbergen. Grecian Theatre, 1875.
- The Grim Goblin; or, Harlequin Octopus, the Devil Fish, and the Fairies of the Flowery Dell. Grecian Theatre, 1876.
- Jack and the Beanstalk, which grew to the moon; or, the Giant, Jack Frost and the Ha-Ha Balloon. Surrey Theatre, 1886. Starring Dan Leno and wife.
- Sinbad and the Little Old Man of the Sea; or, The Tinker, the Tailor, the Soldier, the Sailor, Apothecary, Ploughboy, Gentleman Thief. Surrey Theatre, 1887. Starring Dan Leno and wife.
