= Patricia J. Lancaster =

American architect

Patricia J. Lancaster served as commissioner of the New York City Department of Buildings from April 2002 to April 2008. She is currently a building code consultant to the Durst Organization, a high-end property development company in New York City.

== Personal life ==
Originally from Calgary, Alberta, Canada, Lancaster studied painting and pottery at Linfield College in Oregon, and received a Bachelor of Arts degree in Art and Technology in 1975. She received a Master of Architecture degree in 1981, from the University of Washington in Seattle.

== Career ==
After moving to New York City in 1982, Lancaster worked with architects Perkins and Will, and served as associate director for interiors at Michael Lynn.

Lancaster was assistant vice president of planning, design and construction at Columbia University, and Vice President of LCOR, Inc.

She has served as an adjunct professor at the New York University Real Estate Institute, as an associate professor of architectural design at the University of Washington College of Architecture and Urban Planning, and as an associate professor of art at Linfield College.

Lancaster is a Registered Architect in New York State, and a licensed real estate broker. She is a Fellow of the New York Academy of Medicine, the National Academy of Construction, and the American Institute of Architects.

=== Government ===
From 1994-96, Lancaster served as deputy commissioner for design and construction at the New York City Department of General Services.

In 2002 she was appointed by Mayor Michael Bloomberg as the commissioner of the New York City Department of Buildings. During her tenure she worked to modernize the department, and oversaw a rewrite of the city's building code. She resigned on April 22, 2008, after criticism over an increase in construction accidents.
