= George Augustus Conquest =

English actor, acrobat and playwright (1837–1901)

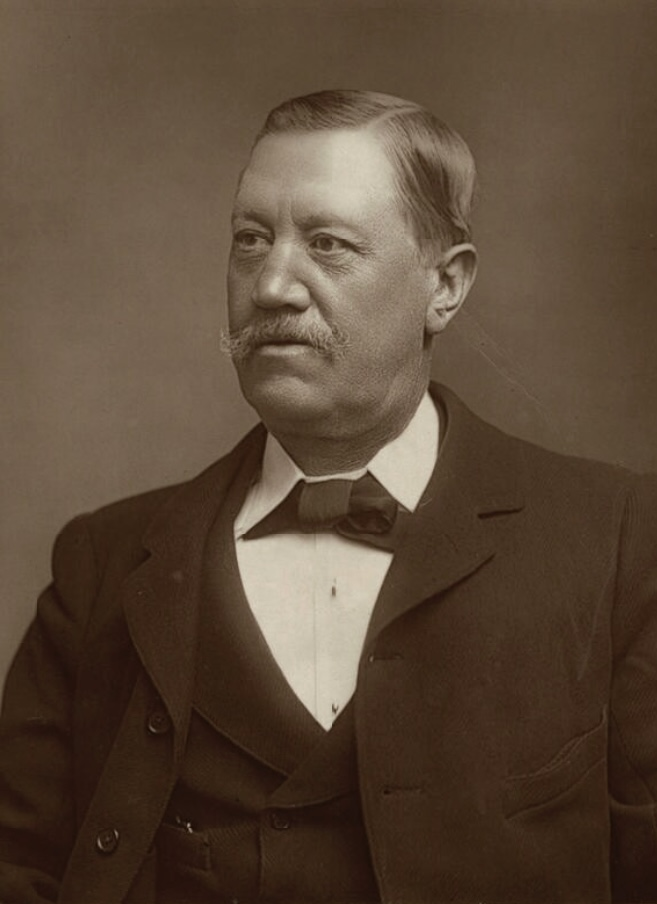
George Conquest in 1895. Photograph by Alfred Ellis

George Augustus Oliver Conquest (4 May 1837–14 May 1901) was a playwright, theatrical manager, acrobat and pantomimist described as "the most stunning actor-acrobat of his time".

== Early life and family ==
Conquest was born in 1837, the son of Clarissa Ann Roxbey née Bennett (c. 1804–1867) and theatrical manager Benjamin Conquest (c. 1804 – 12 July 1872). He was educated in France. In 1857 he married Elizabeth Ozmond (died 1890), with whom he had eleven children, including Lydia, Elizabeth, Amy, Louisa, Daisy, Laura and Ada, and three sons who were also active in the theatre, George Conquest (1858–1926), Fred Conquest (1871–1941) and Arthur Conquest (1875–1945).

== Career ==
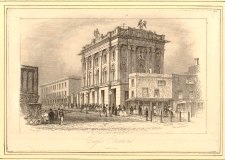
The Eagle Tavern in 1841.

In 1851, Benjamin Conquest acquired the Grecian Theatre and Eagle Tavern in the City Road, Hackney, London. The theatre had previously produced light opera and was originally a music hall, but Conquest senior switched to Shakespeare which was unsuccessful. He then tried melodrama which was more popular and he produced over 100 such shows written by George, often adapted from French productions. George was also an acrobat and pantomimist and produced and appeared in nearly 50 pantomimes with Henry Spry.

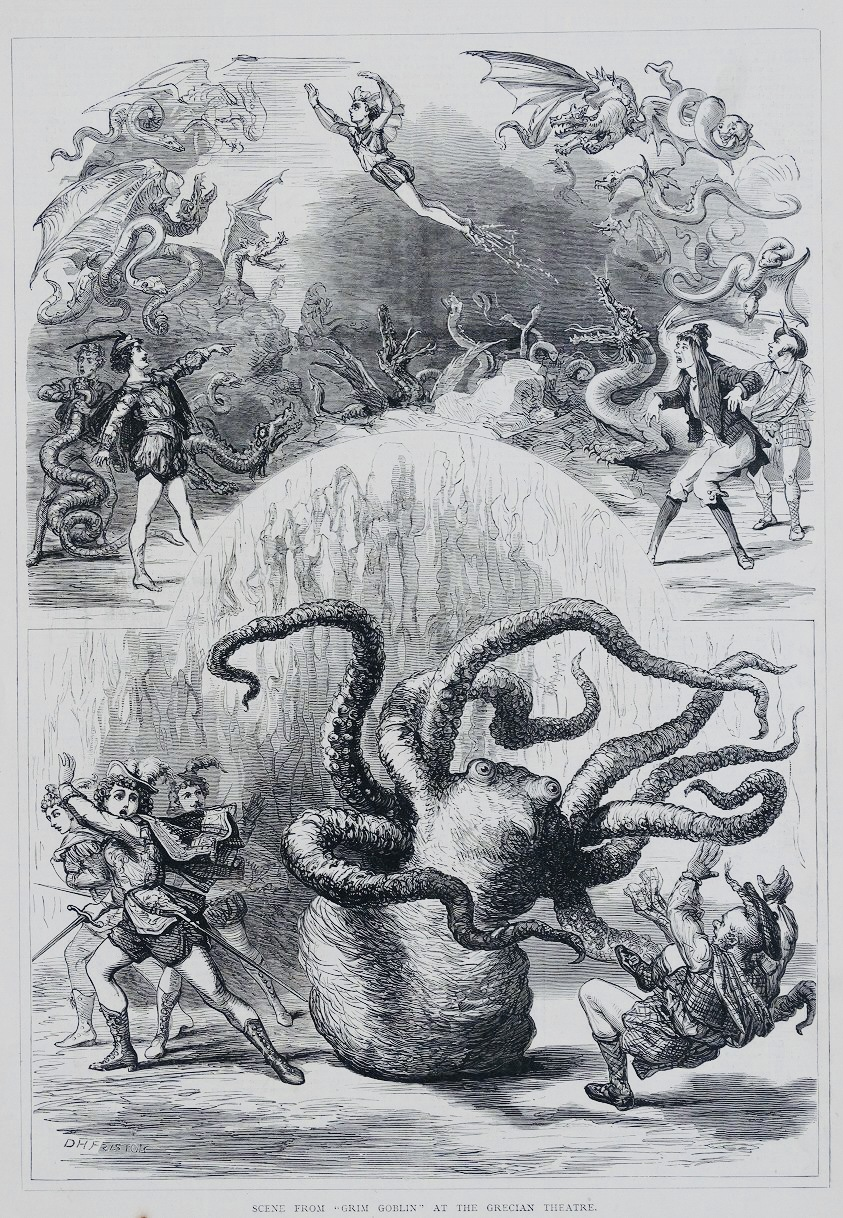
A scene from The Grim Goblin at the Grecian Theatre in London - The Illustrated Sporting and Dramatic News, 30 December 1876, p. 349

George helped to run the Grecian and inherited it on his father's death. The theatre was rebuilt in 1858, again in 1876, and sold in 1879 following which George Conquest went on a tour of the United States in 1880 in The Grim Goblin, which had played with great success at the Grecian in 1876. Conquest and his company arrived in New York in July 1880 and began rehearsals before opening in New York at Wallack's Theatre on 16 August 1880.

Conquest was seriously injured in a stage accident on opening night of The Grim Goblin at Wallack's, as described in an account in The New York Clipper:

Just before the close of the piece, Mr. Conquest and his son attempted "phantom flights", which terminated in a sad disaster. Mr. Conquest made a diagonal ascent from the stage to the flies where he caught a horizontal bar out of the sight of the audience, and then grasped a rope, by which he was to have been lowered to the stage. The flight was successfully accomplished, but after he had grasped the rope and had descended a few feet it parted, and Mr. Conquest fell a long distance, striking the stage with a heavy thud. Assistance was promptly given, and a well-known physician, who chanced to be in a private box, was speedily at his side. The performances were hurriedly finished, and the curtain fell. During the excitement behind the scenes, and the infux of strangers to learn the result of the accident, many exaggerated reports naturally galned circulation, and among these was one which subsequently found its way into print, to the effect that the broken rope gave evidence of having been cut.

Following the accident, the theatre remained closed for two days while the company investigated the cause of the accident and rehearsed a fresh opening, with George Conquest Jr. in his father's part. Although the elder George Conquest eventually recovered from his fractured hip his acrobatic career was over. The pantomime could not go on without him appearing and the public quickly lost interest in it. Cancellations came from the managers of theatres where the production was to tour, and Theodore Moss, who had brought the production to Wallack's, claimed to have lost $10,000.

== Later life ==
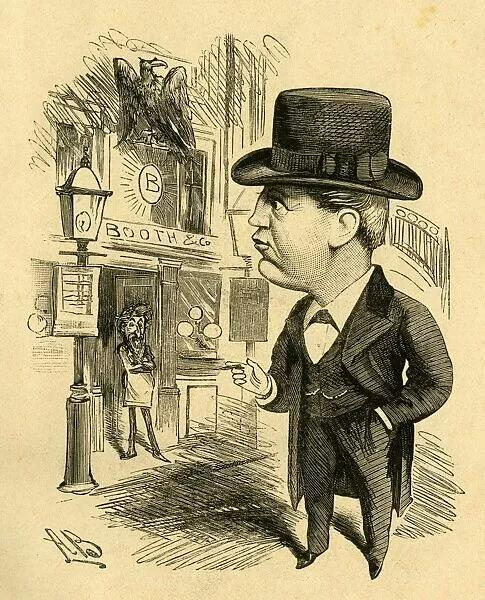
"I wonder if I shall ever be back there!" - George Conquest looking across at the Eagle Tavern, also known as the Grecian Theatre, bought as Salvation Army premises in 1882. William Booth stands in the doorway - Alfred Bryan in Entr'acte (1883)

Conquest returned to England and took over the Surrey Theatre in Lambeth in 1881, staging melodramas and pantomimes as he had at the Grecian. In March 1891 he played the Greek, Ciro Panitza in My Jack, and in 1893 the Miser in Mankind. The last production in which he appeared was Sinbad and the Little Old Man of the Sea &c. with Dan Leno and wife in 1897. His last recorded appearance was at a benefit for Charles Cruikshanks in 1898. His son George took over the theatre on his father's death.

== Death ==
Conquest died of a heart attack at his home in Brixton Hill on 14 May 1901. Hundreds of people came to his funeral at West Norwood Cemetery, and flowers were sent by Henry Irving, J. L. Toole, Herbert Campbell and Dan Leno, among others. He left an estate valued at £64,000.

Of him, his old friend and collaborator Henry Spry wrote:

I have known George Conquest over forty-six years, and never knew him to be guilty of a mean or ungenerous action. He was one of the best and truest of friends a man ever could have. He was a thorough business man, conducting all his affairs himself in a most methodical manner, so that he has left everything perfectly straight and clear. A most faithful and loving husband, and ask his nine children what sort of a father he was.

== Selected works with Henry Spry ==
- Spitz-Spitz the Spider Crab; or The Pirate of Spitsbergen. Grecian Theatre, 1875.
- The Grim Goblin; or, Harlequin Octopus, the Devil Fish, and the Fairies of the Flowery Dell. Grecian Theatre, 1876.
- Jack and the Beanstalk, which grew to the moon; or, the Giant, Jack Frost and the Ha-Ha Balloon. Surrey Theatre, 1886. Starring Dan Leno and wife.
- Sinbad and the Little Old Man of the Sea; or, The Tinker, the Tailor, the Soldier, the Sailor, Apothecary, Ploughboy, Gentleman Thief. Surrey Theatre, 1887. Starring Dan Leno and wife.
