= Dandy Dick (play) =

1887 play by Arthur Wing Pinero

Programme for original production, 1887

Dandy Dick is a three-act farce by Arthur Wing Pinero, first performed in London in 1887. It depicts the complications arising when a respectable clergyman is persuaded to bet on a horse race to subsidise building works on his church. The play has been revived several times and has been adapted for the cinema, radio and television.

== Background and first production ==
In 1883 the actors Arthur Cecil and John Clayton took over the management of the Court Theatre in London. After an uncertain start, with a succession of unprofitable productions, they commissioned Arthur Wing Pinero to write a farce, The Magistrate (1885). It was a considerable success, running for 363 performances, and its successor at the Court, Pinero's The Schoolmistress (1886), also ran well. Cecil and Clayton commissioned a third farce from the author. This, Dandy Dick, opened at the Court on 27 January 1887 and ran for 171 performances there, transferring to Toole's Theatre in July, running there for a further 75 nights.

=== Original cast ===
- The Very Rev Augustin Jedd, DD – John Clayton
- Sir Tristram Mardon, Bart – Edmund Maurice
- Major Tarver – F. Kerr
- Mr Darbey – H. Eversfield
- Blore – Arthur Cecil
- Police Constable Noah Topping – W. H. Denny
- Hatcham, Mardon's groom – William Lugg
- Georgiana Tidman – Mrs John Wood
- Salome – Marie Lewes
- Sheba – Miss Norreys
- Hanna Topping – Laura Linden

== Plot ==
=== Act 1 ===
The scene is the Deanery, the residence of the Very Rev Augustin Jedd, D.D, Dean of St Marvell's. He is somewhat impecunious but in a rash moment has promised to give a thousand pounds towards the restoration of the spire of the cathedral. When the money is asked for he is in no mood to listen to the pleas of his daughters Salome and Sheba, who want money for supposedly charitable purposes, but in fact to pay the bills of a London costumier who has supplied them with outfits for a fancy-dress ball, to which they propose to go surreptitiously with Tarver and Darbey, officers in the Hussars stationed nearby.

The Dean's widowed sister, Georgiana Tidman, arrives to stay for a visit. Her life revolves around horses and racing, and she is owner of one half – the tail end – of a racehorse called Dandy Dick, the other half belonging to Sir Tristram Mardon, an old college friend of the Dean. The local races are to take place on the following day, and Dandy Dick is to run in the Durnstone Handicap. Georgiana, learning about the monetary difficulty in which her nieces find themselves, advises them to "put their petticoats on Dandy Dick".

=== Act 2 ===
Georgiana learns how her brother has financially overcommitted himself with regard to the spire, and she recommends him to put fifty pounds on her horse. The Dean is at first appalled by the suggestion, but later he entrusts his old butler Blore with the necessary sum, to be put on Dandy Dick.

A fire breaks out at the hotel where Mardon has stabled Dandy Dick, and Georgiana has the horse brought to the Deanery. The Dean, anxious that the horse which will carry his money should not have his chances impaired by a chill, prepares a bolus, into which the unscrupulous Blore, who has backed another horse, secretly slips a few grains of strychnine. The Dean, taking the bolus to the stable, is intercepted by the local policeman, who, being new, does not recognise him, arrests him for attempted doping, and locks him up in a police cell overnight.

=== Act 3 ===
The next day, Georgiana arranges with some of her disreputable racecourse friends to rescue the Dean from the police vehicle taking him to appear before the magistrates. Dandy Dick gallops home to win the race, the Dean's daughters win the money they need, but the Dean himself ends up no better off, as Blore has put his £50 on a losing horse. Georgiana comes to his rescue with the requisite £1,000.

== Revivals and adaptations ==
The play was revived in London at Wyndham's Theatre in 1900 with Alfred Bishop and Violet Vanbrugh as the Dean and his sister; the Lyric, Hammersmith in 1930 with Nigel Playfair and Marie Lohr; at the same theatre in 1948 with Denys Blakelock and Joan Young; and the Mermaid Theatre in 1965 with Robert Eddison and Sonia Dresdel; A 1973 production starring Alistair Sim and Patricia Routledge broke box office records at the Chichester Festival and transferred to the Garrick Theatre in London. A production starring Nicholas Le Prevost and Patricia Hodge toured Britain in 2012, but a hoped-for transfer to the West End did not happen, although the production was seen in Richmond, London.

Augustin Daly staged Dandy Dick at Daly's Theatre, New York, in 1887 with Charles Fisher as the Dean and Ada Rehan as Georgiana, but the piece made little impact. An 1890 Australian production with George W. Anson as the Dean ran exceptionally well in both Melbourne and Sydney.

In 1935 the play was adapted into the film Dandy Dick, directed by William Beaudine and starring Will Hay and Mignon O'Doherty.

The BBC broadcast a studio version of the 1948 London production on radio in April 1948 and on television in July. In 1965 the Home Service transmitted a Bristol Old Vic production, with Harold Innocent and Peggy Ann Wood as the Dean and Georgiana, and in the same year BBC television broadcast an adaptation starring Frank Pettingell and Fabia Drake. A 1986 BBC radio version starring Alec McCowen and Patricia Routledge has been broadcast several times.

== References and sources ==
=== Sources ===
- Dawick, John (1993). Pinero: A Theatrical Life. Niwot: University of Colorado Press. ISBN 978-0-87081-302-3.
- Gaye, Freda, ed. (1967). Who's Who in the Theatre (fourteenth ed.). London: Sir Isaac Pitman and Sons. OCLC 5997224.
- Pinero, Arthur W. (1893). Dandy Dick. Chicago: United States Book Company. OCLC 1042912166.
