= Patricia Routledge =

English actress and singer (1929–2025)

Dame Patricia Routledge DBE
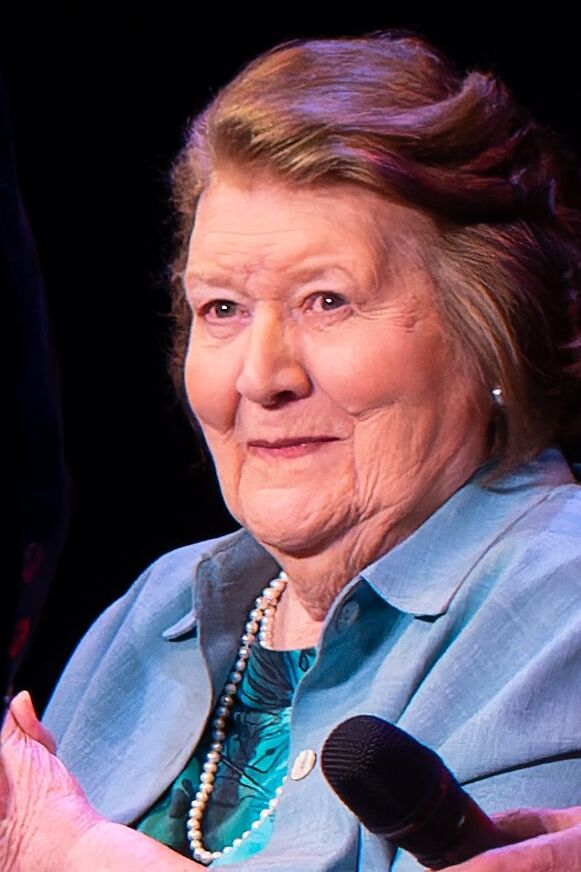
- Routledge in 2023
- Born: Katherine Patricia Routledge; 17 February 1929; Tranmere, Cheshire, England
- Died: 3 October 2025 (aged 96); Chichester, England
- Occupations: Actress; singer
- Years active: 1952–2025

Dame Katherine Patricia Routledge (/ˈraʊtlɪdʒ/ ROWT-lij; 17 February 1929 – 3 October 2025) was an English actress and singer. She was best known for her role as Hyacinth Bucket in the BBC One sitcom Keeping Up Appearances (1990–1995), for which she was twice nominated for the BAFTA TV Award for Best Light Entertainment Performance.

Routledge made her professional stage debut at the Liverpool Playhouse in 1952, and her West End debut in 1959. She made her Broadway debut in 1966, and won the 1968 Tony Award for Best Actress in a Musical for her role in Darling of the Day. She won the 1988 Olivier Award for Best Actress in a Musical for Candide at The Old Vic. Her film appearances include To Sir, with Love (1967) and Don't Raise the Bridge, Lower the River (1968).

Routledge came to prominence during the 1980s in television monologues written by Alan Bennett and Victoria Wood, appearing in Bennett's A Woman of No Importance (1982) and as Kitty in Victoria Wood: As Seen on TV (1985–1986), and being nominated for the BAFTA TV Award for Best Actress for Bennett's Talking Heads: A Lady of Letters (1988). She also starred as Hetty Wainthropp in the television series Hetty Wainthropp Investigates (1990, 1996–1998). Routledge was made a Dame Commander of the Order of the British Empire (DBE) for her services to theatre and charity in 2017.

== Early life ==
Katherine Patricia Routledge was born in Tranmere (which was then in Cheshire and is now in Merseyside) on 17 February 1929, the daughter of Catherine Perry and haberdasher and gentlemen's outfitter Isaac Routledge. Her parents had married in 1924. Routledge attended Birkenhead High School in Oxton before studying at the University of Liverpool, where she gained a degree with honours in English Language and Literature. She was involved in the university's dramatic society, where she worked closely with the academic Edmund Colledge, who both directed and acted in several of the society's productions; he persuaded her to pursue an acting career. After graduating, she trained at the Bristol Old Vic Theatre School and returned to Liverpool to begin her acting career at the Liverpool Playhouse.

== Career ==
=== Theatre ===
Routledge had a long career in theatre, including musical theatre, in the United Kingdom and the United States, her vocal range being that of a mezzo-soprano. In 1956 she appeared as Adriana in a musical version of The Comedy of Errors with music by Julian Slade at the Arts Theatre, which was subsequently broadcast on ITV; Routledge commented at the time that "a lot of people who might have shied off Shakespeare have come along and absolutely adored it because of the music". At the Chichester Festival Theatre her first notable role was Agatha in The Magistrate in 1969 opposite Alastair Sim in the title role, which was a big success and transferred to the West End; they were to reunite in 1973 in another play by Pinero Dandy Dick where she played Georgiana Tidman. Later appearances at Chichester included Emilia in Othello in 1975, Mrs Malaprop in The Rivals which transferred to the West End, Miss Dyott in The Schoolmistress in 1994, Lady Bracknell in The Importance of Being Earnest in 1999 which as well as West End transfers also toured Australia, and The Duchess in Wild Orchids in 2002; one-woman shows included Come for the Ride in 1989 with musical comedy excerpts, A Woman of No Importance and A Lady of Letters by Alan Bennett in 1991, and Admission: One Shilling and Facing the Music.

Her West End credits included Little Mary Sunshine, the first production of Cowardy Custard in 1972, Virtue in Danger, the premiere of Noises Off in 1982 (creating the role of Dotty Otley), The Importance of Being Earnest, and The Solid Gold Cadillac. She was nominated for the Laurence Olivier Award for Best Actress in a Supporting Role for her work in And a Nightingale Sang in 1979. She was a member of the Royal Shakespeare Company (RSC) in the 1980s, appearing in such acclaimed productions as the 1984 Richard III, with Antony Sher in the title role.

A classically trained singer, she made occasionally forays into operetta including taking the title role in an acclaimed production of Jacques Offenbach's La Grande-Duchesse de Gérolstein at the 1978 Camden Festival; "As the Grand Duchess she invested every phrase, spoken or sung ... with wit and meaning, and coloured her tone to express a wide variety of emotions. Never did she resort to the hoydenish behaviour that this role – in British productions at least – seems to invite."

Routledge made her Broadway debut in Roger Milner's comedy How's the World Treating You? in 1966, returning in the short-lived 1968 musical Darling of the Day, for which she won the Tony Award for Best Actress in a Musical, sharing the honour with Leslie Uggams of Hallelujah, Baby! Following this, Routledge had roles in several more unsuccessful American productions including a musical called Love Match, in which she played Queen Victoria; the legendary 1976 Leonard Bernstein flop 1600 Pennsylvania Avenue, in which she portrayed every U.S. First Lady from Abigail Adams to Lucy Webb Hayes; and a 1981 musical, Say Hello to Harvey – based on the Mary Coyle Chase play Harvey (1944) – which closed in Toronto before reaching New York City.

In 1980, Routledge played Ruth in the Joseph Papp production of The Pirates of Penzance, co-starring American actor Kevin Kline and pop vocalist Linda Ronstadt, at the Delacorte Theatre in New York City's Central Park, one of a series of Shakespeare in the Park summer events. The show was a hit and transferred to Broadway the following January, with Estelle Parsons replacing Routledge. A DVD of the Central Park production, with Routledge, was released in October 2002. She also performed in Façade at New York's Carnegie Recital Hall.

Routledge won a Laurence Olivier Award in 1988 for her portrayal of the Old Lady in Leonard Bernstein's Candide in the London cast of the critically acclaimed Scottish Opera production. One critic noted "She stopped the show with 'I am so easily assimilated', and her long narration worked on at least two levels – it was both hilarious and oddly moving." She also played the role of Nettie Fowler to great acclaim in the 1992 National Theatre production of Carousel, which won the Olivier Award for Best Musical Revival in 1993.

In a 2006 Hampstead Theatre production of The Best of Friends, she portrayed Dame Laurentia McLachlan. In 2007 she starred in Alan Bennett's Office Suite at Chichester and on tour, playing roles she had originated in TV versions almost thirty years previously. In 2008, she played Queen Mary in Royce Ryton's play Crown Matrimonial. More recent work included the role of Dame Myra Hess in the tribute show Admission: One Shilling from 2009, the narrator in The Carnival of the Animals with the Nash Ensemble in 2010, and Lady Markby in An Ideal Husband at the Chichester Festival Theatre in 2014.

From 2009, Routledge toured with a show entitled Facing the Music. The show featured insights into her musical theatre career.

=== Film and television ===
==== 1960s and 1970s ====
Routledge's screen credits included To Sir, with Love (1967), Pretty Polly (1967), 30 Is a Dangerous Age, Cynthia, The Bliss of Mrs. Blossom, Don't Raise the Bridge, Lower the River (all 1968), If It's Tuesday, This Must Be Belgium (1969) and Girl Stroke Boy (1971).

Routledge's early television appearances included a role in Steptoe and Son, in the episode "Seance in a Wet Rag and Bone Yard" (1974), as a clairvoyant called Madame Fontana. She also appeared in Coronation Street (1961), followed by the role of Maggie in ITV's Play of the Week Hobson's Choice (opposite Michael Caine as Will Mosop) (1962), and as a white witch in Doctor at Large (1971). Routledge played Mrs. Jennings in the BBC mini-series production of Sense and Sensibility (1971).

==== 1980s ====
Routledge did not come to prominence on television until she featured in monologues written for her by Alan Bennett and later Victoria Wood in the 1980s. She first appeared in A Woman of No Importance, the second installment of Bennett's anthology, Objects of Affection in 1982. She then played the opinionated Kitty in Victoria Wood: As Seen on TV in 1985. She performed two further monologues in Bennett's Talking Heads in 1988 and 1998. Routledge was nominated for a British Academy Television Award for Best Actress for the monologue "A Lady of Letters". In 1989, Routledge appeared in a series of television advertisements for the RAC.

==== 1990s ====
In 1990, Routledge accepted the lead role of Hetty Wainthropp in an ITV mystery drama, Hetty Wainthropp: Missing Persons. ITV opted not to pursue a series after the pilot episode, but in 1996 the BBC produced the first series of Hetty Wainthropp Investigates, with Routledge again in the lead role. The show co-starred Dominic Monaghan as her assistant and Derek Benfield as her husband. It first aired in January 1996 and ran until late 1998. Monaghan, who went on to enjoy a Hollywood career, credited Routledge as "an amazing teacher" who taught him some "very valuable lessons" in acting.

In 1990, Routledge was cast as Hyacinth Bucket in the comedy series Keeping Up Appearances. She portrayed a formerly working-class woman with social pretensions (insisting her surname be pronounced "bouquet") and delusions of grandeur (her oft-mentioned "candlelight suppers"). Routledge delighted in portraying Hyacinth, as she said she "couldn't stand people like her" in real life. In 1991, she won a British Comedy Award for her portrayal and she was later nominated for two BAFTA TV Awards in 1992 and 1993. Throughout 1993, Routledge also appeared as Hyacinth in a number of television advertisements for British Gas. In 1994, she appeared as Hyacinth again in a UK television infomercial for the charity Second Chance; Josephine Tewson also reprised her Keeping Up Appearances role. Routledge also played Hyacinth on the BBC in a series of infomercials for TV licensing.

Routledge ended her role as Hyacinth in 1995, despite the series' continued popularity, as she wanted to pursue other acting roles. In a 2017 interview, Routledge said: "I always thought of the great, great Ronnie Barker. He always left something when he was on a high, and it's much better to have people say now 'Oh, why didn't you do some more?' than having them say 'Oh, is that still on?'". Another reason she wished to leave the role was that she felt that the writer (Roy Clarke) was "recycling some old ideas that we'd already dealt with".

Routledge also played several real-life characters for television, including Barbara Pym, and a dramatised biographical documentary about Hildegard of Bingen for BBC Omnibus in 1994.

==== 2000–2025 ====
In 2001, Routledge starred in Anybody's Nightmare, a fact-based television drama in which she played Sheila Bowler, a mother and piano teacher who served four years in prison for murdering her elderly aunt, but was later acquitted following a retrial.

In 2016, Routledge presented Beatrix Potter with Patricia Routledge on Channel 4 to celebrate the 150th anniversary of Potter's birth.

In January 2023, Channel 5 aired a 67-minute Keeping Up Appearances retrospective special for their 30 Years Of Laughs series. Cast, crew and celebrities paid tribute to the show. The documentary featured an interview with Routledge, who was 93 at the time, sharing her memories of the show along with supporting cast members Judy Cornwell, Jeremy Gittins and David Janson.

=== Radio and audio books ===
In 1966, Routledge sang the role of Mad Margaret in Ruddigore, the title role in Iolanthe and Melissa in Princess Ida, in a series of BBC Radio Gilbert and Sullivan recordings. She took part in a studio broadcast of Tchaikovsky's opera Vakula the Smith (narrating excerpts from the work by Gogol) in 1989.

Her extensive radio credits included several Alan Bennett plays and the BBC dramatisation of Carole Hayman's Ladies of Letters, in which she and Prunella Scales played retired women exchanging humorous correspondence over the course of several years. A tenth series of Ladies of Letters premiered on BBC Radio 4 in 2009. Routledge's radio work prior to 1985 included Private Lives, Present Laughter, The Cherry Orchard, Romeo and Juliet, Alice in Wonderland and The Fountain Overflows.

Having a distinctive voice, Routledge also recorded and released a variety of audiobooks including unabridged readings of Wuthering Heights and Alice's Adventures in Wonderland and abridged novelisations of the Hetty Wainthropp Investigates series.

== Personal life ==
Routledge never married and had no children. In a 2001 interview with The Telegraph, she said, "I didn't make a decision not to be married and not to be a mother. Life just turned out like that because my involvement in acting was so total." In the same interview, she admitted to having an affair with a married man in her late 20s and another affair with the director of a play she was in years later.

Routledge settled in Chichester in 2000 and was a regular churchgoer at Chichester Cathedral. In 2020, she helped raise £10,000 towards the restoration of the cathedral's roof. She was a patron of the Beatrix Potter Society and Keswick's Theatre by the Lake. She was also an ambassador of Kidney Research UK.

She was a close friend of Betty Boothroyd, a Labour Party MP and Speaker of the House of Commons, and her cover of "Climb Ev'ry Mountain" was played at Boothroyd's funeral in March 2023.

== Death and tributes ==
=== Death ===
Routledge died in her sleep at her home in Chichester on 3 October 2025 aged 96. Her funeral was held at Chichester Cathedral on 5 November, followed by cremation at Chichester Crematorium.

=== Tributes ===
Tributes to her were paid by BBC director of comedy Jon Petrie, who described her as an actor of "remarkable range" and her role in Keeping Up Appearances as "one of the most iconic performances in British comedy", adding that she "made millions laugh and left a legacy that will always be remembered with gratitude and admiration". Keeping Up Appearances creator Roy Clarke said that he was "sorry, as sure as so many people would be, to hear of [her death]" and that it was "a fortunate coincidence to find [his] scripts in the hands of such an accomplished actor". Routledge said of the afterlife: "When I approach the pearly gates, I'd like to hear a champagne cork popping, an orchestra tuning up and the sound of my mother laughing."

== Honours ==
Routledge was appointed Officer of the Order of the British Empire (OBE) in the 1993 Birthday Honours, Commander of the Order of the British Empire (CBE) in the 2004 Birthday Honours, and Dame Commander of the Order of the British Empire (DBE) in the 2017 New Year Honours for services to theatre and charity.

Routledge was awarded an honorary MA by the University of Chichester in 2001. In 2008, Routledge received an honorary degree of Doctor of Letters from Lancaster University for her contribution to drama and theatre. On 15 March 2019, she received an honorary degree of Doctor of Letters from the University of Chester at Chester Cathedral for her contributions to theatre and television.

In 2022, the Royal Academy of Music conferred Routledge with honorary membership. An honorary president of the Association of English Singers & Speakers (which exists to "encourage communication of English words in speech and song with clarity, understanding and imagination"), Routledge sponsored the annual AESS National English Song Prize from 2003 until her death. She was given the Freedom of the Borough of Wirral on 17 January 2025.

== Filmography ==
=== Film ===
Year	Title	Role	Director
1967	To Sir, with Love	Clinty Clintridge	James Clavell
1967	Pretty Polly	Miss Gudgeon	Guy Green
1968	30 Is a Dangerous Age, Cynthia	Mrs Woolley	Joseph McGrath
1968	Don't Raise the Bridge, Lower the River	Lucille Beatty	Jerry Paris
1968	The Bliss of Mrs. Blossom	Miss Reece	Joseph McGrath
1969	Lock Up Your Daughters	Nurse	Peter Coe
1969	If It's Tuesday, This Must Be Belgium	Mrs Featherstone	Mel Stuart
1970	Egghead's Robot	Mrs Janice Wentworth	Milo Lewis
1971	Girl Stroke Boy	Pamela Hovendon	Bob Kellett

=== Television ===
Year	Title	Role	Notes
1956–1966	ITV Play of the Week	Various	6 episodes
1960	The Terrible Choice		
1961	Hilda Lessways	Hilda Lessways	6 episodes
1961	Coronation Street	Sylvia Snape	5 episodes
1961	His Polyvinyl Girl	New mother	Play in Armchair Theatre series
1962	Hobson's Choice	Maggie Hobson	Granada TV play
1962	Z-Cars	Madge Kenton	1 episode
1964	Victoria Regina	Queen Victoria	Four part serial
1965	Not So Much a Programme, More a Way of Life	Irish Mother	2 episodes
1965	No Hiding Place	Pat	1 episode
1965	Gaslight Theatre	'Our Mary'	1 episode
1967	Thirty-Minute Theatre	Beryl Turner	1 episode
1967	Seven Deadly Sins	Mrs Vealfoy	1 episode, "The Good and Faithful Servant"
1967	Androcles and the Lion	Megaera, Androcles' Wife	Television film
1968	The Ed Sullivan Show	Performer, "Not on Your Nellie"	Soundtrack
1969	ITV Saturday Night Theatre	Hazel Day	1 episode
1970	Egghead's Robot	Mrs Janice Wentworth	Children's Film Foundation
1970	ITV Playhouse	Fern/Rose	1 episode
1970	Up Among The Cuckoos	Miss Furling	Play in Armchair Theatre series
1971	Sense and Sensibility	Mrs. Jennings	TV adaptation of the Austen novel
1971	Doctor at Large	Audrey Watt	Episode - It's all in the mind
1971	Play of the Month: Tartuffe	Dorine	Videotaped drama
1971	Vincent Price is in the Country	Herself	Television film
1972	His and Hers	Myrtle Waller	Episode: "Driving"
1973	Ooh La La!	Lucienne Homenides de Histangau	Episode entitled Caught in the Act (adaptation of the farce A Flea in Her Ear)
1973	That's Life	On-screen participant	BBC pilot programme
1974	Affairs of the Heart	Mrs. Meldrum	1 episode
1974	Steptoe and Son	Madame Fontana	1 episode
1974	...And Mother Makes Five	Mrs. Fletcher	2 episodes
1974	David Copperfield	Mrs. Micawber	TV adaptation of the Dickens novel
1975	Play of the Month: When We Are Married	Annie Parker	Television adaptation of Priestley play (played Maria Helliwell in 1987 version)
1975	More Awkward Customers	Cast member	Video Arts training film
1976	Crown Court	Dr. Barbara Baxter	3 episodes
1977	Nicholas Nickleby	Madame Mantalini	BBC mini-series
1977	Jubilee	Jane	1 episode, "Plain Jane". Broadcast 14 June 1977
1977	The Cost of Loving	Sarah Taplow	
1978	BBC2 Play of the Week	Miss Protheroe	1 episode, "A Visit from Miss Protheroe"
1978	Doris and Doreen	Doreen Bidmead	Television film (see Office Suite below)
1979	Crown Court	Rita Finch	3 episodes
1980	The Pirates of Penzance	Ruth	Television film
1980	Play for Today	ATS Officer	1 episode, "The Imitation Game"
1980	The Curse of King Tut's Tomb	'Posh' Lady	Television film
1982	Objects of Affection	Peggy Schofield	1 episode, "A Woman of No Importance"
1983	The Beggar's Opera	Mrs. Peachum	BBC Television film of the ballad opera by Gay
1983	Keep Off the Grass	Bag Lady	Short
1983	The Two Ronnies	Madame Bultitude	1 episode
1984	Home Video		Television film
1985	Marjorie and Men	Marjorie Belton	6 episodes
1985–1986	Victoria Wood: As Seen on TV	Kitty	5 episodes
1987	When We Are Married	Maria Helliwell	Television adaptation of Priestley play (played Annie Parker in 1975 version)
1988	Tales of the Unexpected	Milly Dobson	1 episode, "The Verger"
1988	Talking Heads	Miss Ruddock	Episode: "A Lady of Letters"
1988	Sophia and Constance	Mrs Baines	3 episodes
1989	First and Last	Ivy	Television film
1989	Let's Face the Music	On screen participant	Yorkshire TV (programmes on Noël Coward, Jerome Kern and Frederick Loewe)
1990	Missing Persons	Hetty Wainthropp	Television film
1990	Alas Smith and Jones		1 episode
1991	Miss Pym's Day Out	Barbara Pym	1 episode
1993	The World of Peter Rabbit and Friends	Cousin Ribby	2 episodes
1994	Hildegard of Bingen	Hildegard von Bingen	BBC TV Dramatisation/documentary
1990–1995	Keeping Up Appearances	Hyacinth Bucket	Main role
1996–1998	Hetty Wainthropp Investigates	Hetty Wainthropp	Main role
1998	Talking Heads 2	Miss Fozzard	Episode: "Miss Fozzard Finds Her Feet"
2001	Anybody's Nightmare	Sheila Bowler	Television film
2003	Kathleen Ferrier – An Ordinary Diva	Reading the letters of Kathleen Ferrier	Television documentary
2005	Blips	Narrator	Voice
2016	Beatrix Potter with Patricia Routledge	Herself – Presenter	Documentary
2018	Joe Orton Laid Bare	Herself	Documentary about Orton's life and work, speaks about The Good and Faithful Servant (1967)
2023	Keeping Up Appearances – 30 Years Of Laughs	Herself/Hyacinth Bucket/Kitty	Documentary
2024	Dame Patricia Routledge...Remembers Keeping Up Appearances	Herself/Hyacinth Bucket	
2024	Dame Patricia Routledge...Remembers Miss Pym's Day Out	Herself/Barbara Pym	
2024	Dame Patricia Routledge...Remembers Hetty Wainthropp Investigates	Herself/Hetty Wainthropp	
2024	Dame Patricia Routledge...Remembers Talking Heads	Herself/Miss Irene Ruddock/Miss Fozzard	

== Stage ==
Year	Production	Role	Venue
1952	A Midsummer Night's Dream	Hippolyta	Liverpool Playhouse, Liverpool
1954	The Duenna	Carlotta	Bristol Old Vic and Westminster Theatre, London
1956	The Comedy of Errors	Adriana	Arts Theatre, London
1957	Zuleika	Aunt Mabel	Saville Theatre, London
1959	The Love Doctor	Henrietta Argan	Piccadilly Theatre, London
1960	Follow That Girl	Mrs Gilchrist	Vaudeville Theatre, London
1961	Come As You Are		Guildford
1961	Out of My Mind		Lyric Theatre, Hammersmith
1962	Little Mary Sunshine	Mary Potts ("Little Mary Sunshine")	Comedy Theatre, London
1963	Virtue in Danger	Berinthia	Mermaid Theatre and Strand Theatre, London
1964	Home and Beauty	Victoria	Croydon
1965	How's the World Treating You?	Violet/Nell/Rover	Arts Theatre and Wyndham's Theatre, London (1965) and Music Box Theatre, New York City (1966)
1968	Darling of the Day	Alice Challice	George Abbott Theatre, New York City
1968	Love Match	Queen Victoria	Ahmanson Theatre, Los Angeles
1969	The Caucasian Chalk Circle	Mother-in-law	Chichester Festival Theatre
1969	The Country Wife	Lady Fidget	Chichester Festival Theatre
1969	The Magistrate	Agatha Posket	Chichester Festival Theatre and Cambridge Theatre, London
1971	First Impressions	Mrs Bennet	Birmingham Repertory Theatre
1972	Cowardy Custard		Mermaid Theatre, London
1973	Dandy Dick	Georgina Tidman	Chichester Festival Theatre and Garrick Theatre, London
1975	The Cherry Orchard	Madame Ranevskaya	Bristol Old Vic
1975	Othello	Emilia	Chichester Festival Theatre
1975	Made in Heaven	Martha Avon	Chichester Festival Theatre
1976	1600 Pennsylvania Avenue	All of the First Ladies	Mark Hellinger Theatre, New York City
1976	The Rivals	Mrs Malaprop	Royal Exchange Theatre, Manchester
1976	Zack	Mrs Munnings	Royal Exchange Theatre, Manchester
1977	On Approval	Maria Wislack	Vaudeville Theatre, London
1978	The Grand Duchess of Gerolstein	The Grand Duchess	Collegiate Theatre, Camden, London
1978	Gracious Living	Daisy Tuttle	Eisenhower Theatre, Washington, D.C.
1978	Semmelweiss	Julia	Eisenhower Theatre, Washington, D.C.
1979	The Schoolmistress	Miss Dyott	Royal Exchange Theatre, Manchester
1979	And a Nightingale Sang...	Peggy Stott	Queen's Theatre, London
1980	The Pirates of Penzance	Ruth	Delacorte Theater, New York City
1981	Say Hello to Harvey		Toronto, Canada
1982	Noises Off	Dotty Otley	Lyric Theatre, Hammersmith and Savoy Theatre, London
1983	When the Wind Blows		Whitehall Theatre, London
1984	Richard III	Queen Margaret	Royal Shakespeare Company
1985	Henry V	Mistress Quickly	Royal Shakespeare Company
1986	When We Are Married	Maria Helliwell	Whitehall Theatre, London
1988	Candide	Old Lady	The Old Vic, London
1989	Come for the Ride	(one-woman show)	UK tour
1992	Talking Heads	Miss Schofield/Miss Ruddock	Comedy Theatre, London
1992	Carousel	Nettie Fowler	National Theatre, London
1994	Mr and Mrs Nobody	Carrie Pooter	Greenwich Theatre, London
1994	The Rivals	Mrs Malaprop	Chichester Festival Theatre and Albery Theatre, London
1994	The Schoolmistress	Miss Dyott	Chichester Festival Theatre
1996	Beatrix	Beatrix Potter	Minerva Theatre, Chichester and UK tour
1999–2001	The Importance of Being Earnest	Lady Bracknell	Chichester Festival Theatre and Theatre Royal Haymarket, London (1999), Australian tour (2000) and Savoy Theatre, London (2001)
2002	Wild Orchids	Duchess	Chichester Festival Theatre
2004	The Solid Gold Cadillac	Mrs Laura Partridge	Garrick Theatre, London
2006	The Best of Friends	Dame Laurentia McLachlan	Hampstead Theatre and UK tour
2007	Office Suite	Miss Protheroe/Doreen	Minerva Theatre, Chichester and UK tour
2008	Crown Matrimonial	Queen Mary	UK tour
2009–2019	Admission: One Shilling	Myra Hess	UK and Australian tours
2009–2025	Facing the Music	Herself	UK tours
2014	An Ideal Husband	Lady Markby	Chichester Festival Theatre

== Discography ==
Year	Album	Notes
1960	Follow That Girl	Original London Cast
1962	Little Mary Sunshine	Original London Cast
1963	Virtue in Danger	Original London Cast
1965	Hello, Dolly!	1965 London Studio Cast (Mrs Irene Molloy)
1966	The Sound of Music	1966 London Studio Cast (Mother Abbess)
1967	Androcles and the Lion	1967 Television Cast
1967	Kiss Me, Kate	1967 London Studio Cast (Lilli/Katherine)
1968	Darling of the Day	1968 Original Broadway Cast
1969	A Talent to Amuse: Noel Coward's 70th Birthday Concert	1969 Concert Cast
1970	Noel Coward's 'Nude With Violin'	1970 BBC Radio 4 Production Cast
1972	Cowardy Custard	1972 Original London Cast
1976	Cole	1976 Studio Cast
1985	I Remember Mama	1985 Original Cast Members (Aunt Jenny)
1987	An Evening With Alan Jay Lerner	1987 Concert Cast

=== Solo album ===
Year	Album	Notes
1973	Presenting Patricia Routledge	Re-released on CD in 1996

== Awards and nominations ==
Year	Award	Category	Work	Result
1966	Whitbread Award	Outstanding Musical Performance	How's The World Treating You?	Won
1968	Tony Award	Best Actress in a Musical	Darling of the Day	Won
1979	Olivier Award	Best Supporting Actress	And a Nightingale Sang...	Nominated
1984	Broadcasting Press Guild Award	Best Actress	A Woman of No Importance	Won
1985	Olivier Award	Best Supporting Performance	Richard III	Nominated
1988	Olivier Award	Best Actress in a Musical	Candide	Won
1989	BAFTA TV Award	Best Actress	Talking Heads: A Lady of Letters	Nominated
1991	British Comedy Award	Best TV Comedy Actress	Keeping Up Appearances	Won
1992	BAFTA TV Award	Best Light Entertainment Performance	Keeping Up Appearances	Nominated
1992	Olivier Award	Best Actress	Talking Heads	Nominated
1993	BAFTA TV Award	Best Light Entertainment Performance	Keeping Up Appearances	Nominated
1993	Variety Club of Great Britain Award	Personality of the Year	Keeping Up Appearances	Won
