= John Clayton (British actor) =

English actor

Clayton, 1888 engraving

John Alfred Calthrop known as John Clayton (14 February 1845 – 27 February 1888) was an English actor. After building a career in a range of parts, he became best known for his roles in the farces of Arthur Wing Pinero. With Arthur Cecil he was joint manager of the Court Theatre in London from 1883 until his death, aged 43, while on tour in Liverpool.

== Life and career ==
=== Early years ===
John Alfred Calthrop was born at Deeping Fen (also given as nearby Gosberton), Lincolnshire, on 14 February 1845, the fifth son of farmer and grazier James Thompson Calthrop (1793-1873) and his wife Edna Naylor (1807/8-1893), née Knowles. Notwithstanding the suggested "probability" of a relationship to the Norfolk Calthorpe family from which came the lawyer Sir Henry Calthorpe, the first of the Calthrop family at Gosberton was Richard (1655-1710), who established a line of middle-class armigerous clergymen, Army officers, and physicians. John Clayton's seven siblings included J. G. Calthrop, coroner for South Lincolnshire, Edward, a London physician, and Claude, a prize-winning painter and Royal Academician. Clayton was educated at Merchant Taylors' School in London.

After some successful amateur experiences he made his first professional appearance on the stage on 27 February 1866, at the St James's Theatre, as George Hastings in She Stoops to Conquer. The theatrical newspaper The Era reported, "He has a good figure, and showed an easy self-possession which enabled him to acquit himself with credit". The paper added that it was doubtful if light comedy was the genre in which the debutant would make his reputation.

Over the next decade Clayton appeared in a range of roles in London. At the Olympic Theatre he appeared in a "comedietta" called Six Months Ago, then played Landry Barbeau in the drama The Grasshopper (1867). He joined the company at the Gaiety Theatre in March 1869, appearing there in T. W. Robertson's comedy Dreams, The Old Score, A Life Chase, and Uncle Dick's Darling, in the last of which he played Joe Lennare to the Dollond of J. L. Toole and the Chevenix of Henry Irving. At the Princess's Theatre in February 1876 he played Nigel in a revival of The King o' Scots, and in May of the same year played Jaggers at the Court Theatre in an adaptation of Great Expectations. In November 1876 he made a marked success as Mr Jormell in H. T. Craven's comedy Coals of Fire.

In July 1872 Clayton played Joseph Surface in a long-running revival of The School for Scandal at the Vaudeville Theatre, after which he made a mark as the distraught father in an adaptation of Sandeau and Decourcelle's Marcel. Irving was beginning to make a reputation at the Lyceum Theatre, where Clayton joined the company in 1873. In 1875 he moved to the Mirror Theatre, playing a highly dramatic role, Hugh Trevor in All for Her. The Pall Mall Gazette described his performance as "remarkable". In January, 1877 he returned to the St James's, now under the management of Mrs John Wood, where he played Osip, in the long-running English version of The Danischeffs. In that year he married Eve Boucicault (1857–1900), daughter of the actor and playwright Dion Boucicault; their son- later an author, illustrator, and painter- was named "Dion" after his grandfather. They had two further sons- one born after Clayton's death- and a daughter. In January 1879 he played George D'Alroy in a revival of Caste at the Prince of Wales's Theatre.

=== Last years ===
Together with Arthur Cecil, Clayton took over the management of the Court in 1883. They opened in September with a new comedy, The Millionaire by G. W. Godfrey, in which they appeared with a cast including Mrs John Wood, Marion Terry, and Mrs Beerbohm Tree. After that they presented what The Pall Mall Gazette called "a series of unhealthy emotional dramas which never caught the public taste". They then turned to farce, commissioning, staging and starring in Arthur W. Pinero's The Magistrate (1885), which ran for more than a year. They followed it with two more Pinero farces, The Schoolmistress (1886) and Dandy Dick (1887).

The old Court theatre closed in July 1887 at the end of the run of Dandy Dick. Clayton commissioned a new building on the site from Walter Emden. While it was being built Clayton led a provincial touring company, presenting The Magistrate and Dandy Dick, gaining excellent reviews and good houses. While playing in Liverpool in February 1888 Clayton caught a cold, which reportedly developed into erysipelas from which he died on 27 February, aged 43. He was buried at Brompton Cemetery at a service attended by many leading figures from the theatrical profession, including Cecil, Pinero, Mrs John Wood, W. S. Gilbert, Squire Bancroft, W. H. Kendal, Brandon Thomas, Johnston Forbes Robertson, George Grossmith and Oscar Wilde.

== References and sources ==
=== Sources ===
- Gaye, Freda, ed. (1967). Who's Who in the Theatre (fourteenth ed.). London: Sir Isaac Pitman and Sons. OCLC 5997224.
