= Pauline Rita =

English soprano and actress (1842–1920)

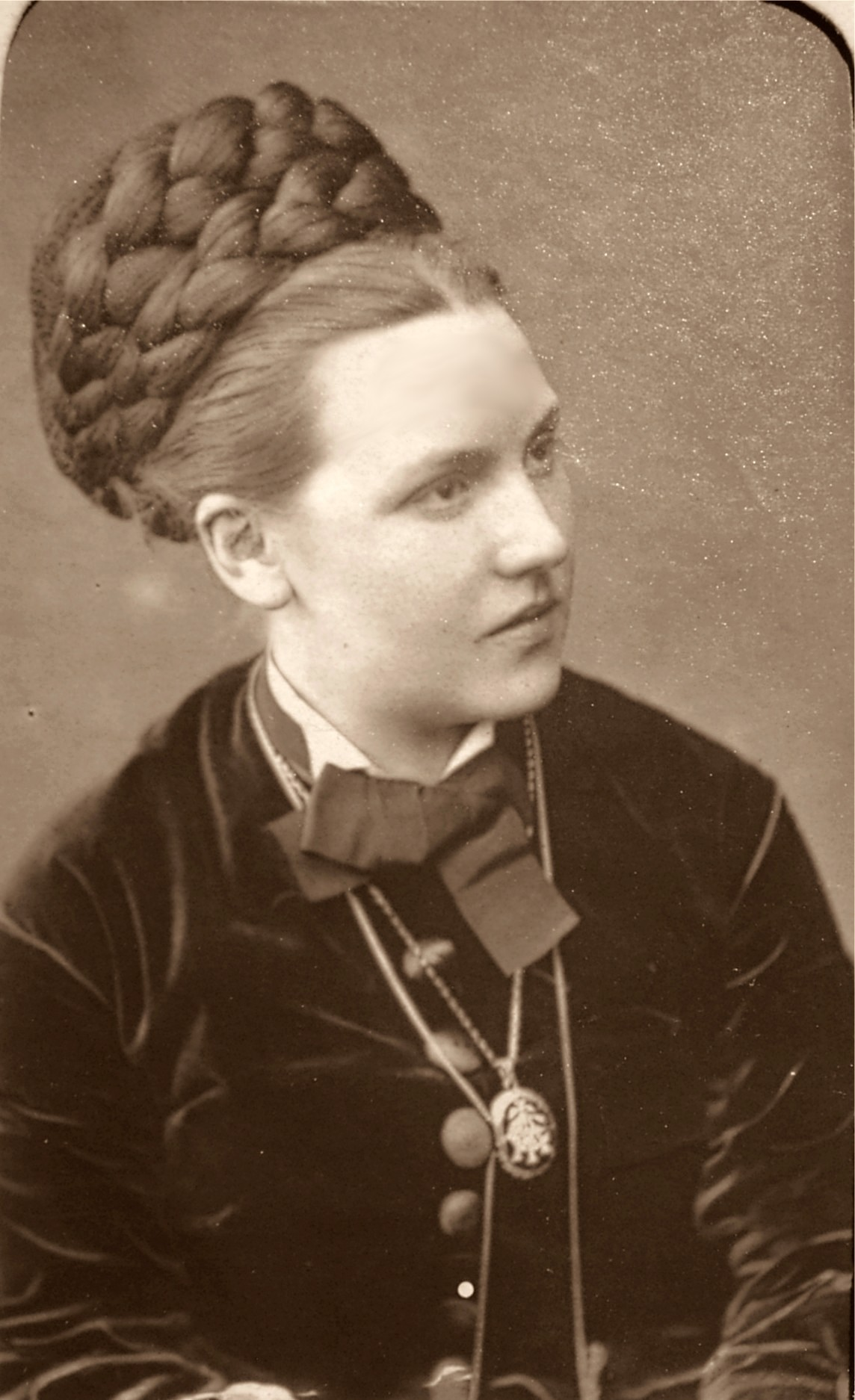
Pauline Rita as a young woman

Pauline Rita (1 June 1842 – 28 June 1920), born Margaret Glenister, was an English soprano and actress. During her early career, she was best known for her performances in operettas and comic operas at the Opera Comique and was associated with impresario Richard D'Oyly Carte. Later she married flautist John Radcliff, and the two performed together for many years.

== Early life ==
Rita was born in Bourne End, Buckinghamshire, in 1842, the eldest of six children of Anne Elizabeth née Burdock (1811–1866) and William Glenister (1808–1885), a shoemaker. The 1851 census lists her in Marylebone, London, aged 8, where she was living with her aunt Jemima and uncle, Mark Taylor, a quarry owner. She was still living there ten years later. The Musical World reported that "an English girl about eighteen years of age" by the name of Miss Glenister had appeared in a Benefit for Castellani at Ivrea, near Milan, singing pieces from Lucia di Lammermoor and I masnadieri. In 1869 her singing teacher was Charlotte Sainton-Dolby, and in the same year the two appeared together on the concert platform. Rita married Thomas Phillips, an auctioneer, in London in December 1863, and the couple had two sons: Herbert Tom Phillips (born 1864) and Edward Stanley Phillips] (1866–1957). She made her opéra-bouffe début on the Doncaster stage in 1871 as Margaret Phillips but was later widowed.

In 1870 she sang the soprano part in the oratorio St Paul at Cirencester, but when the Italian opera season of 1871 opened she was a supporting member of the company, given parts such as Flora in La traviata, Countess Ceprano in Rigoletto, "the peasant girl with a few phrases to sing in the last act" in Le due giornate by Mayr or Teresa in La sonnambula. She subsequently went on tour with James Henry Mapleson's company, but took just one week out to go to Doncaster and sing Frédégonde opposite the Chilpéric of Emily Soldene.

== Oratorio and operetta ==
In 1872, Rita took part in a joint recital with Charles Santley at St James's Hall, London. In the same year she sang in Handel's oratorio Athalia in Glasgow, where the local critic was unimpressed: "Mdlle. Rita has a voice nearly always in tune, but of a shrill and unsympathetic quality, and she indulges from time to time in that fatal vibrato to which we have so often objected." In 1874, she performed in Richard D'Oyly Carte's light opera company at the Opera Comique, in The Broken Branch, an English version of Gaston Serpette's La branch cassée, in which she received better notices: "Madame Pauline Rita has achieved a triumph in her first appearance on the stage. She possesses a voice of singular flexibility, acts well, and looks attractive." In December 1874 she played the lead role of the Prince de Conti in Charles Lecocq's Les Prés St. Gervais at the Criterion Theatre. The following year, she starred in the title role, Clairette Angot, in a revival of Lecocq's La fille de Madame Angot at the Opera Comique, which replaced La Périchole on the bill with Trial by Jury. In October of that year she appeared as Barbara in Alfred Cellier's The Tower of London at the Prince's Theatre, Manchester.

In January 1876 at the Royalty Theatre, she appeared under Carte's management as Gustave Muller in The Duke's Daughter. On 5 May 1876, Rita was the beneficiary of a special matinée at the Princess's Theatre at which Selina Dolaro, Mrs Howard Paul, Arthur Cecil and many others contributed, and Alfred Cellier conducted his operetta Dora's Dream. That summer, she repeated her roles of Gustave Miller and also played the Plaintiff in Trial by Jury on tour with Carte's Opera Bouffe Company (with Carte himself as musical director). In 1877, at a benefit performance for Henry Compton, described by The Era as "undeniably the greatest event known in the annals of the Stage", Rita played the Plaintiff in a star-studded performance of Trial by Jury, conducted by Arthur Sullivan, with W. S. Gilbert as the Associate, Arthur Cecil as the Usher, W. H. Cummings as the Defendant, and famous performers such as George Grossmith, W. S. Penley, Kate Bishop and Marion Terry in the chorus.

Apart from the Plaintiff, Rita played two Gilbert and Sullivan roles – one for D'Oyly Carte and one not. She played Aline in The Sorcerer on tour in Liverpool in March 1878, and in September 1879 she played Josephine in H.M.S. Pinafore in the production mounted by Carte's former partners in the Comedy Opera Company after he had separated from them. She never returned to D'Oyly Carte management. During the late 1870s, Rita performed with Charles Morton's opera company at the Opera Comique.

== Later years ==
In 1881, Rita's voice suffered from overwork, and she moved to Australia to rest and stay with family. In January 1884 in Australia she married the celebrated flautist John Richardson Radcliff (1842–1917), to whom she had become engaged in London in 1881. Together, they organised a successful three-year tour through Australia and New Zealand in 1884–86. Returning to Britain, they continued to give the programme they had perfected on tour: "Flutes of All Ages: Mr Radcliff ... playing on twenty different instruments selections from the music of all countries and all times. The entertainment was varied by songs, rendered with finished vocal ability, by Madame Pauline Rita." They then developed this show as Pan to Pinafore and presented it around Britain for several years with great success.

Rita undertook some vocal teaching, her success being noted in the press. In later years, she became blind. In their final years the couple were in financial difficulties, and a fund was set up to provide for their needs.

Rita died at her home in Kensington, London, after a long illness.
