= Matilda Wood =

Matilda Wood could refer to:

- Matilda Alice Victoria Wood, a.k.a. "Marie Lloyd" (1870-1922), an English music hall singer, comedian and musical theatre actress
- Matilda Charlotte Vining Wood, a.k.a. "Mrs. John Wood" (1831-1915), an English actress and theatre manager
