= Giulia Warwick =

English opera and concert singer and professor of music (1857–1904)

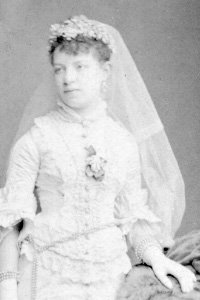
Warwick as Aline in The Sorcerer

Giulia Warwick (15 January 1857 – 13 July 1904) was an English opera and concert singer and professor of music in the last quarter of the 19th century. She is best known for roles with Richard D'Oyly Carte's Comedy Opera Company and with the Carl Rosa Opera Company.

== Early life and career ==
Born Julia Ehrenberg, her stage name came from her birthplace, Warwick Street, in Regent's Park, Camden, London. Her father Jacob Ehrenberg was a Jewish tailor from Poland, and her mother was Evelina née Elias. Warwick and her two sisters were all interested in music. She originally intended to be a pianist, studying with Sigismond Lehmeyer, and playing at the Hanover Square Rooms and the Beethoven Rooms as early as 1869, when she was only 12 years old, and then at St. George's Hall in 1872. She then studied singing under Madame Sainton-Dolby and sang regularly at the Berkeley Street Synagogue with her elder sister Annie (died 1897). By 1873, the teenager was performing with the Kilburn Musical Society in William Jackson's oratorio Isaiah and, later that year, in the Covent Garden promenade concerts. She soon sang at the Royal Albert Hall in Elijah with William Carter's choir. In Cambridge, she appeared as one of the mermaids in a concert version of Oberon.

In 1876, under her stage name, Giulia Warwick, she joined the Carl Rosa Opera Company to make her operatic debut in soprano roles at the Alexandra Palace as Zerlina in Mozart's Don Giovanni, then played Arline in Michael Balfe's The Bohemian Girl and Marzelline in Beethoven's Fidelio, both at the Lyceum Theatre. She soon appeared in the opera Bjorn the Queen's Theatre, and in a concert party tour singing in Israel in Egypt in Belfast and appearing at Wilhelm Kuhe's Brighton Festival, and at the Leeds Triennial Festival with the violinist August Wilhelmj, earning warm reviews. She also sang at The Crystal Palace, the Royal Agricultural Hall and at the Covent Garden proms in Elsa's Dream.

== The Sorcerer and later years ==
Warwick then joined Richard D'Oyly Carte's Comedy Opera Company and originated the role of Constance in Gilbert and Sullivan's comic opera, The Sorcerer in November 1877. Three months later, she was promoted to the leading soprano role, Aline, in that opera. She also created the role of Dora Leslie in Dora's Dream, a companion piece by Arthur Cecil and Alfred Cellier. Later In 1878, she created another part, Lady Viola, in the Cellier and James Albery curtain raiser, The Spectre Knight.

She then left the company and appeared in concerts until she returned to the Carl Rosa Opera Company, in Dublin in December 1878, as Ann Chute in Julius Benedict's The Lily of Killarney. Warwick continued to perform with that company for the next three-and-a-half years, making 224 appearances in seventeen operas, including in the British premieres of Piccolino by Guiraud (as Elena) and the English adaptation of Ponchielli's I Promessi Sposi (as the mother). Other roles included the Gipsy Queen in The Bohemian Girl, Clara in The Siege of Rochelle by Balfe, Bianca in The Taming of the Shrew, Ritta in Zampa, Paquita in Carmen and Martha in Faust. Many of these were mezzo-soprano roles. Her last performance with Carl Rosa was as Donna Inez in Balfe's Moro, Painter of Antwerp at the Prince's Theatre, Manchester, in mid-1882. Warwick then resumed concert singing; in 1883, with Willing's choir, she appeared together with her younger sister Alexandra at St James’s Hall.

In 1884, for Alexander Henderson, she created the role of Jessamine in Robert Planquette's Nell Gwynne at the Avenue Theatre. She then began a long tour of the British provinces for Henderson, earning success playing Edwige and later the title role in Chassaigne's Falka, playing the role many times, including at the 1,000th performance of the opera in 1886. She also played Daphne in Glamour and toured in Pepita. She then played as Fraisette in The Old Guard by Marion Edgcumbe at the Avenue Theatre and Princess Etelka in Nadgy. She also appeared in several musical plays, including as Barbara in The Belle of Cairo. In 1889, with Charles Wibrow's Opera Company, she was touring in Girouette (Weathercock), composed by A. Caedes, alongside Durward Lely. The same year on tour, she sang Frédérique in La Girouette, and in 1890 she played Isadora in The Black Rover at the Globe Theatre. In 1891, with her own "Giulia Warwick Opera Company", she played the title-role in the French musical comedy Madame Cartouche, composed by Léon Vasseur.

In 1892 Warwick produced her own concert at the Prince's Hall and then turned to music hall comedy. She joined the Guildhall School of Music in 1894 to teach in the department of "gesture, elocution and deportment" but continued her career. In 1896 she played Aunt Barbara, alongside May Yohe, in The Belle of Cairo, where she received a warm review as a "very tiny woman, with a big voice and vivid personality". Later that year, after her sister Alexandra's death, she retired from the stage to become a professor of music at the Guildhall School, resigning in 1902 to found her own vocal school.

Warwick died in 1904 at the age of 47 in London and was buried in Willesden Jewish Cemetery.
