= The Schoolmistress (play) =

1886 play by Arthur Wing Pinero

Rose Norreys as Peggy Hesslerigge, 1886

The Schoolmistress is a farce by Arthur Wing Pinero. It depicts the complications at a girls' boarding school when the headmistress is away, leaving her feckless husband in charge.

The play opened at the Court Theatre, London in March 1886 and ran for 291 performances.

== Background and first production ==
Pinero's first farce for the Court Theatre, The Magistrate (1885) had been a considerable success, running for 363 performances, and rescuing the management from financial difficulties caused by earlier, unsuccessful productions. The leading figures in the new piece were written for the stars of The Magistrate, Arthur Cecil and Mrs John Wood. The play opened on 27 March 1886 and ran for 291 performances until 22 January 1887.

== Original cast ==
- The Hon Vere Queckett – Arthur Cecil
- Rear-Admiral Rankling – John Clayton
- Lieut John Mallory – F. Kerr
- Mr Saunders – Edwin Victor
- Mr Reginald Paulover – H. Eversfield
- Mr Otto Bernstein – Mr Chevalier
- Tyler – W. Phillips
- Goff – Fred Cape
- Jaffray – William Lugg
- Mrs Rankling – Emily Cross
- Miss Dyott – Mrs John Wood
- Dinah – Miss Cudmore
- Gwendoline Hawkins – Miss Viney
- Ermyntrude Johnson – Miss La Coste
- Peggy Hesslerigge – Rose Norreys
- Jane Chipman – Miss Roche

Source: The Era.

== Plot ==
(from a summary printed in The Era)
The Hon. Vere Queckett is an impecunious member of the aristocracy whom Miss Dyott has married for his position in society, supporting him from the profits of her college. These proving insufficient to provide for Mr Queckett's extravagance, the devoted wife resolves, unknown to him, to go on the stage in a comic opera. She takes her leave of her husband, ostensibly to go to visit a friend in the provinces, but in fact to appear before the footlights that evening.

Beneath the calm surface of life at Volumnia House complications have already been brewing. One of Mrs Queckett's pupils has been privately married before the Registrar to her almost equally juvenile and absurdly jealous fiancé, Mr Reginald Paulover. This girl's name is Dinah, and she is the daughter of Rear-Admiral Archibald Rankling, an old sea-lion of the hoarsest, gruffest, and most savage sort.

The proposal of Mr Paulover for the hand of Miss Rankling has been received by the young lady's parents with the sternest refusal, and has been followed by her immediate seclusion in Volumnia College. In the absence of his wife, Queckett determines to invite a few friends to supper, and telegraphs accordingly to his old friend, Lieut. John Mallory. This telegram falls into the hands of a pupil, Peggy Hesslerigge, who uses it as a lever to induce Queckett to include her schoolfellows, Gwendoline Hawkins and Ermyntrude Johnson, in his invitation.

Queckett is reluctantly obliged to spend on the party with its unexpectedly large guest list the money left with him by his wife to pay the rent, the fire insurance, and the servants' wages. Mallory arrives, and brings with him his friend Rear-Admiral Rankling; and, as Dinah and her young husband are also present, it is fortunate that the Admiral has been too long at sea to be able to recognise his daughter. Supper is followed by a dance, which is in full swing when the servant runs in with the news that the boy in buttons has set the house on fire in playing with fireworks. The fire brigade arrive, and the escape is planted outside the windows of the class-room; and the pupils escape by one, whilst Mrs Queckett, in the full attire of a queen of opera bouffe, enters at the other. There ensues a series of tête-à-têtes, explanations and reconciliations leading to a resolution satisfactory to all parties.

Source: The Era.

== Critical reception ==
The reviewers praised Pinero's skill and that of the cast. The Era commented that the final act amounted almost to a series of sketches, not all relevant to the working out of the plot, but very funny nonetheless. The Pall Mall Gazette commented that many of the audience must have gone home with aching sides, and thought the plot more farcical than Pinero had attempted before, and considered the piece among the cleverest and best-acted farces for a good many years.

== Revivals ==
The play was given at the Standard Theatre, New York, in December 1886 by the company of Rosina Vokes, but had a fairly short run of 28 performances. In the 20th century it was revived in London at the Vaudeville Theatre in 1913, the Arts Theatre in 1949, the Savoy Theatre, in April 1964, and in Manchester at the Royal Exchange Theatre, in February 1979.

== References and sources ==
=== Sources ===
- Dawick, John (1993). Pinero: A Theatrical Life. Niwot: University of Colorado Press. ISBN 978-0-87081-302-3.
