= Nell Gwynne (operetta) =

Comic opera composed by Robert Planquette with libretto by H. B. Farnie

1884 press drawing of Nell Gwynne

Nell Gwynne is a three-act comic opera composed by Robert Planquette, with a libretto by H. B. Farnie. The libretto is based on the play Rochester by William Thomas Moncrieff. The piece was a rare instance of an opera by a French composer being produced first in London. Farnie had written an earlier libretto on the same subject, with the same name, for composer Alfred Cellier, which was produced at the Prince's Theatre in Manchester in 1876.

The opera was first performed at the Avenue Theatre in London on 7 February 1884. It then transferred to the Comedy Theatre on 28 April 1884. The production starred Florence St. John, Arthur Roberts, Giulia Warwick and Lionel Brough. In America, it was first produced in June 1884 in St. Louis and in New York City at the Casino Theatre beginning on 8 November 1884.

It was later produced in Paris as La Princesse Colombine, with a libretto by E. André Ordonneau, at the Théâtre des Nouveautés, beginning on 7 December 1886, but it was not a success in France.

== Roles and original cast ==
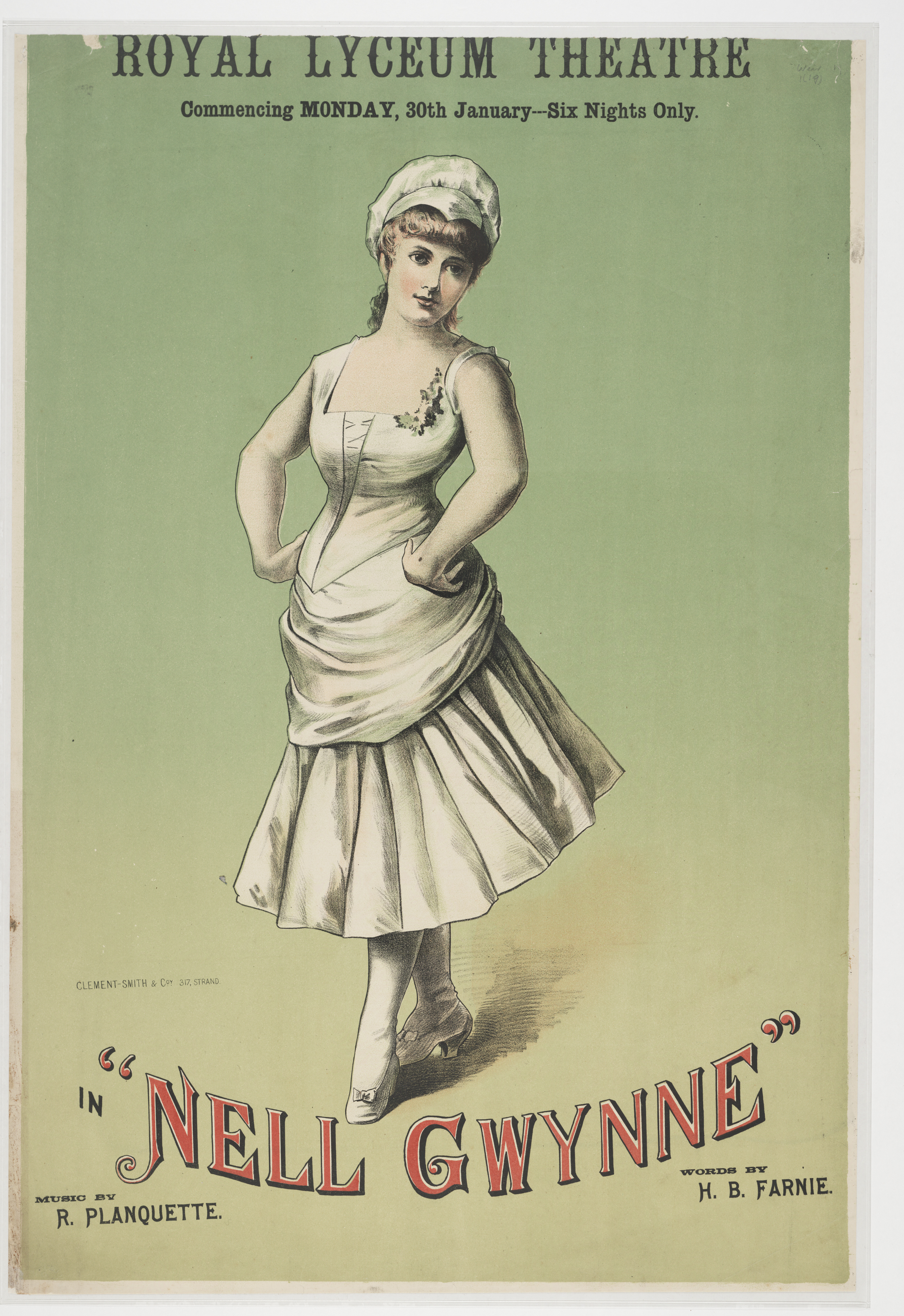
Poster from the Royal Lyceum Theatre, Edinburgh, 1888

- Nell Gwynne (of the King's Theatre) – Florence St. John
- Lady Clare (ward of the King) – Agnes Stone
- Jessamine (niece of Weasel) – Giulia Warwick
- Marjorie (parish waif – servant to Weasel) – Victoria Reynolds
- Buckingham (in disgrace at Court – Landlord at the Dragon) – M. Dwyer
- Rochester (in disgrace at Court – Waiter at the Dragon) – A. Cadwalader
- The Beadle (the local authority) – Lionel Brough
- Weasel (village pawnbroker) – Arthur Roberts
- Talbot (cousin to Clare) – Cecil Crofton
- Falcon (a strolling player) – Henry Walsham
- Hodge and Podge (villagers) – Messrs. D. St. John and Hunt
- Peregrine (Buckingham's footboy) – Agnes Lyndon
- King Charles II, villagers, farmers, courtiers, waiters, etc.

== Musical numbers ==
- 1. (a) Chorus — "No Heel-Taps"

(b) Scene — "He Brings our Score"
(c) "To you Ladies" (Buckingham and Chorus)

- 2. "The British Waiter" (Rochester and Buckingham)
- 3. "Only an Orange Girl " (Nell)
- 4. "O Heart! My Lover's Near!" (Jessamine, Rochester, Buckingham and Weasel)
- 5. "Once upon a Time" (Buckingham)
- 6. "O'er their Young Hearts " (Nell, Clare, Rochester and Buckingham)
- 7. Chorus — "Clubs and Cudgels"
- 8. "Tis I!" (Beadle and Chorus)
- 9. "Sweetheart, if Thou be Nigh!" (Falcon)
- 10. Finale, Act I: "O Surprise!" (Company)

Entr'acte

- 11. Pawn Chorus — "About the Middle of the Week"
- 12. Rustic Rondo (Nell)
- 13. "Tic, Tac" (Jessamine)
- 14. "Maid of the Witching Eye" (Nell and Clare)
- 15. "Now the Spell" (Nell, Jessamine, Clare, Rochester, Buckingham and Weasel)
- 16. "First Love" (Nell)
- 17. "The Dappled Fawn " (Jessamine and Falcon)
- 18. "Illusions!" (Buckingham)
- 19. "Turn About" (Buckingham and Rochester)
- 20. Finale, Act II: '"What's Passing Here" (Company)

Entr'acte

- 21. Hunting Chorus — "The Eager Hounds"
- 22. "The Broken Cavalier" (The Legend of Chelsea Hospital) (Nell)
- 23. "The Trysting Tree" (Falcon)
- 24.(a) "The Ball at Whitehall" (Nell)

(b) "Green Sleeves" (Nell)

- 25. "Happy the Lot" (Weasel and Beadle)
- 26. "The Rendez-vous" (Nell, Clare, Rochester and Buckingham)
- 27. "Timid Bird" (Jessamine and Falcon)
- 28. Finale, Act III (Company)
