= Dora's Dream =

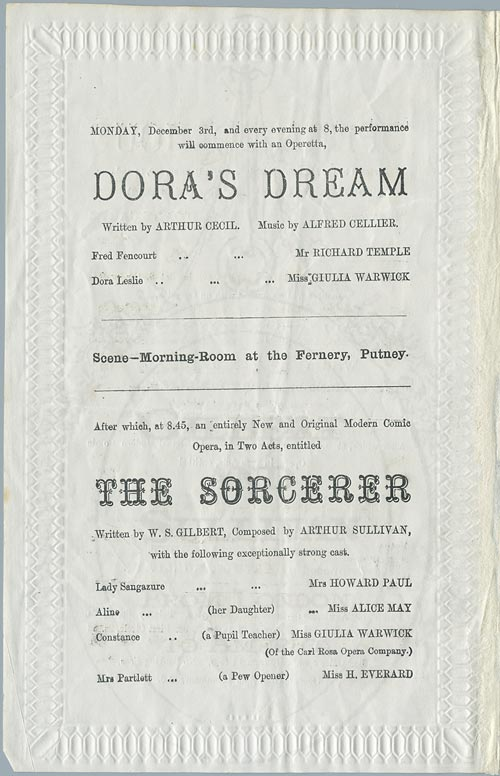
From 1877 programme

Dora's Dream is a one-act operetta, with music composed by Alfred Cellier and a libretto by Arthur Cecil.

The piece was first performed at the Royal Gallery of Illustration on 3 July 1873, with Fanny Holland and Arthur Cecil starring in the two roles. It was performed again with the same cast on 5 May 1876 at the Princess's Theatre in London for Pauline Rita's benefit.

The opera was revived on 17 November 1877 at the Opera Comique as a curtain raiser to The Sorcerer, which opened on the same night. It then ran until 7 or 8 February 1878, starring Giulia Warwick and Richard Temple. The curtain raiser debuted to a warm review from The Times, which wrote, "This pleasant and sparkling bagatelle at once put the house in good humour."

No printed libretto or vocal score is found in the British Library, but the license copy of the libretto resides in the Lord Chamberlain's collection, Add. MS. 53194, play no. A, NovDec 1877. Only dialogue is given, not the lyrics of the songs, and in Cecil's original draft, it was apparently not intended to be performed with music.

== Background ==
The fashion in the late Victorian era was to present long evenings in the theatre, and so producer Richard D'Oyly Carte preceded his Savoy operas with curtain raisers such as Dora's Dream. W. J. MacQueen-Pope commented, concerning these curtain raisers:

This was a one-act play, seen only by the early comers. It would play to empty boxes, half-empty upper circle, to a gradually filling stalls and dress circle, but to an attentive, grateful and appreciative pit and gallery. Often these plays were little gems. They deserved much better treatment than they got, but those who saw them delighted in them. ... [They] served to give young actors and actresses a chance to win their spurs ... the stalls and the boxes lost much by missing the curtain-raiser, but to them dinner was more important.

A memorable line in the play is Fred's opinion of the perfect woman: "Order is a first rate quality in a wife. I maintain that if a girl cannot be born with a silver spoon in her mouth, she ought to be born with a bunch of keys at her waist."

== Synopsis ==
Setting: A drawing room in a villa in Putney.

Fred Fancourt, a stockbroker, courts his cousin, Dora. He seeks a comfy, capable, dumpy little wife. Dora, on the other hand, has begun reading great literature and declares that she will only marry a poet. They play charades, and Fred takes the opportunity to show that poets are impossible to live with, while Dora shows how insufferable stockbrokers can be to their wives. Both dreams shattered, and the couple agrees to part. Eventually, however, they make up and (presumably) get married and live happily ever after.

== Roles and cast ==
- Dora Leslie, a romantic young lady - Fanny Holland (1873 and 1876); Giulia Warwick (1877-78)
- Fred Fancourt, her cousin, of the Stock Exchange - Arthur Cecil (1873 and 1876); Richard Temple (1877-78)
- a voice outside, supposed to be Dora's father
- a servant's voice outside (identified as that of Jennie Sullivan in a theatre programme
