= Gaslight Theatre (TV series) =

1965 British television series

Alfred Marks & Patricia Routledge in Britons to the Rescue; Radio Times cover, 1965

Gaslight Theatre is a 60-minute UK anthology television series produced by and airing on the British Broadcasting Corporation (BBC) in 1965. It consisted of six 19th century melodramas presented in the spirit of the Victorian theatre, when theatres were lit by gas lamps instead of electric light. Among its guest stars were Ronnie Barker, Joss Ackland, and Patricia Routledge.

== Episodes ==
- Maria Marten; or, The Murder in the Old Red Barn - adapted by and starring Alec Clunes; with Eira Heath in the title role.
- Sweeney Todd; or The Demon Barber of Fleet Street by Dibdin Pitt, first staged in 1847. Adapted by Alec Clunes and starring Alfred Marks as the murderous barber.
- Britons to the Rescue; or, English Virtue Preserved in South America - a TV adaptation by Alec Clunes, of Paul Meritt and Henry Pettitt’s British Born, a patriotic melodrama first staged in 1873. Starring Alfred Marks, Ronnie Barker and Patricia Routledge.
- The Blood-Craz’d Scourge of the Redskin Wilderness; or, What You Will - an adaptation of the 19th-century American revenge melodrama Nick of the Woods; or, the Jibbenainosay by Louisa H. Medina. Starring Ronnie Barker and Joss Ackland.
- The Drunkard; or, The Sins of the Parents Shall be Visited . . . An adaptation of the 19th-century American melodrama The Drunkard; or, The Fallen Saved by W. H. Smith. Starring Ronnie Barker and Warren Mitchell.
- The Worst Woman in London by Walter Melville, 1899. Starring Ronnie Barker and Warren Mitchell.

All episodes were directed by Bryan Sears.
