= Royal Court Theatre =

Theatre in London, England

- 1870: New Chelsea Theatre
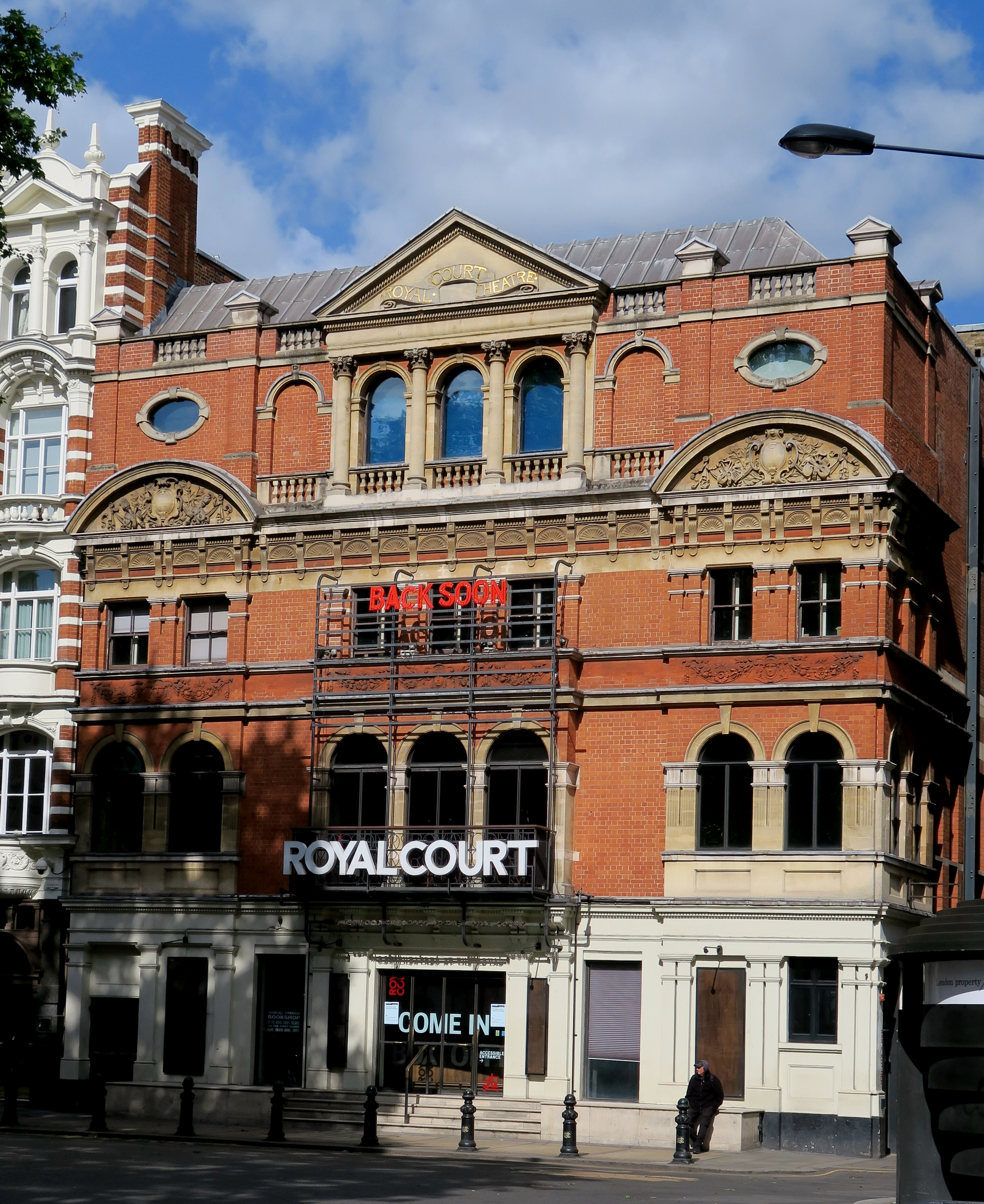
- The Royal Court Theatre in 2020
- Interactive map of Royal Court Theatre
- Address: Sloane Square; London, SW1; United Kingdom
- Coordinates: 51.4926°N 0.1565°W
- Owner: English Stage Company
- Capacity: Theatre Downstairs: 380; Theatre Upstairs: 85
- Type: Non-commercial theatre
- Designation: Grade II listed
- Public transit: Sloane Square

Construction
- Opened: 1870; 156 years ago
- Rebuilt: 1888 (Walter Emden & Bertie Crewe); 2000 (Haworth Tompkins)

Website
- royalcourttheatre.com

The Royal Court Theatre, at different times known as the Court Theatre, the New Chelsea Theatre, and the Belgravia Theatre, is a non-commercial theatre in Sloane Square, London, England, opened in 1870; the current building was completed in 1888. The capacity of the theatre has varied between 728 seats and today's 380 seats (with a smaller upstairs theatre opened in 1969). In 1956 it was acquired by and remains the home of the English Stage Company, which focuses on contemporary theatre and won the Europe Prize Theatrical Realities in 1999.

== History ==
=== The first theatre ===
The first theatre on Lower George Street, off Sloane Square, was the converted Nonconformist Ranelagh Chapel, opened as a theatre in 1870 under the name The New Chelsea Theatre. Marie Litton became its manager in 1871, hiring Walter Emden to remodel the interior, and it was renamed the Court Theatre. (Note: During mid-1870, it was briefly called the "Belgravia" Theatre, but all of W. S. Gilbert's pieces presented at the theatre, beginning in 1871, were publicised as playing at the "Court Theatre".)

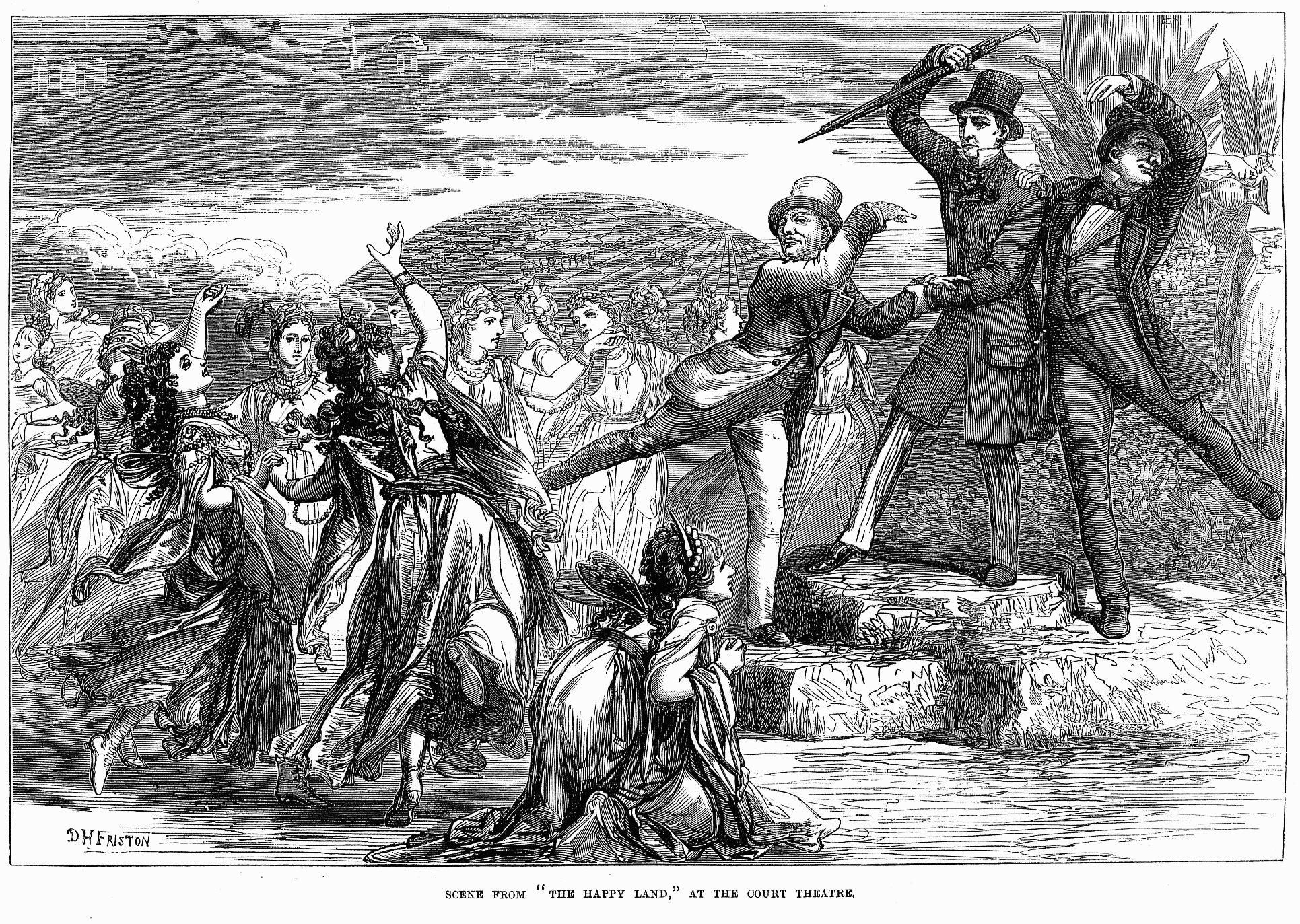
Scene from The Happy Land, showing the scandalous impersonation of Gladstone, Lowe, and Ayrton (1873)

Several of W. S. Gilbert's early plays were staged here, including Randall's Thumb, Creatures of Impulse (with music by Alberto Randegger), Great Expectations (adapted from the Dickens novel), and On Guard (all in 1871); The Happy Land (1873, with Gilbert Abbott à Beckett; Gilbert's most controversial play); The Wedding March, translated from Un Chapeau de Paille d'Italie by Eugène Marin Labiche (1873); The Blue-Legged Lady, translated from La Dame aux Jambes d'Azur by Labiche and Marc-Michel (1874); and Broken Hearts (1875). By 1878, management of the theatre was shared by John Hare and W. H. Kendal.

Further alterations were made in 1882 by Alexander Peebles, after which its capacity was 728 (including stalls and boxes, dress circle and balcony, amphitheatre, and gallery). After that, Arthur Cecil (who had joined the theatre's company in 1881) was co-manager of the theatre with John Clayton. Among other works, they produced a series of Arthur Wing Pinero's farces, including The Rector, The Magistrate (1885), The Schoolmistress (1886), and Dandy Dick (1887), among others. The theatre closed on 22 July 1887 and was demolished.

=== The current theatre: 1888–WWII ===
The present building was built on the east side of Sloane Square, replacing the earlier building, and opened on 24 September 1888 as the New Court Theatre. Designed by Walter Emden and Bertie Crewe, it is constructed of fine red brick, moulded brick, and a stone facade in free Italianate style. Originally the theatre had a capacity of 841 in the stalls, dress circle, amphitheatre, and a gallery.

Cecil and Clayton yielded management of the theatre to Mrs. John Wood and Arthur Chudleigh in 1887, although Cecil continued acting in their company (and others) until 1895. The first production in the new building was a play by Sydney Grundy titled Mamma, starring Mrs. John Wood and John Hare, with Arthur Cecil and Eric Lewis. By the end of the century, the theatre was again called the "Royal Court Theatre".

Harley Granville-Barker managed the theatre for the first few years of the 20th century, and George Bernard Shaw's plays were produced at the New Court for a period. It ceased to be used as a theatre in 1932, but was used as a cinema from 1935 to 1940, until World War II bomb damage closed it.

=== The English Stage Company ===
After the war, the interior was reconstructed as a stage theatre by Robert Cromie, and the number of seats was reduced to under 500. The theatre re-opened in 1952, with Oscar Lewenstein as the general manager. In 1954, Lewenstein, together with George Devine, Ronald Duncan and Greville Poke, founded the English Stage Company (ESC) with a mission to present plays by young and experimental dramatists and "the best contemporary plays from abroad". Devine served as the first artistic director of the ESC, while Poke was its Honorary Secretary. The ESC purchased the Royal Court in 1956 and began to produce adventurous new and foreign works, together with some classical revivals.

The new company's third production in 1956, John Osborne's Look Back in Anger, was a play by one of the Angry Young Men. The director was Tony Richardson. Osborne followed Look Back in Anger with The Entertainer, starring Laurence Olivier as Archie Rice, a play the actor effectively commissioned from the playwright. The artistic board of the ESC initially rejected the play, although they soon reversed that decision. Two members of the board opposed The Entertainer: Duncan disliked Osborne's work, according to the biographer John Heilpern, (Note: Despite Heilpern's claim, Duncan seems to have recognised the qualities of Look Back in Anger.) while Lewenstein, a former Communist, did not want one of the theatre's new plays to be overwhelmed by its star and did not think much of the play.

In the mid-1960s, the ESC became involved in issues of censorship. Their premiere productions of Osborne's A Patriot for Me and Saved by Edward Bond (both 1965) necessitated the theatre turning itself into a "private members club" to circumvent the Lord Chamberlain, formally responsible for the licensing of plays until the Theatres Act 1968. The succès de scandale of the two plays helped to bring about the abolition of theatre censorship in the UK. During the period of Devine's directorship, besides Osborne and Bond, the Royal Court premiered works by Arnold Wesker, John Arden, Ann Jellicoe and N.F. Simpson. Subsequent Artistic Directors of the Royal Court premiered work by Christopher Hampton, Athol Fugard, Howard Brenton, Caryl Churchill, Hanif Kureishi, Sarah Daniels, Errol John, David Storey, Timberlake Wertenbaker, Martin Crimp, Sarah Kane, Sylvia Wynter, Mark Ravenhill, Martin McDonagh, Simon Stephens, Leo Butler, Polly Stenham and Nick Payne. Early seasons included new international plays by Bertolt Brecht, Eugène Ionesco, Samuel Beckett, Jean-Paul Sartre, and Marguerite Duras. In addition to the 400-seat proscenium arch Theatre Downstairs, the much smaller studio Theatre Upstairs was opened in 1969, at the time a 63-seat facility. The Rocky Horror Show premiered there in 1973. The theatre was Grade II listed in June 1972.

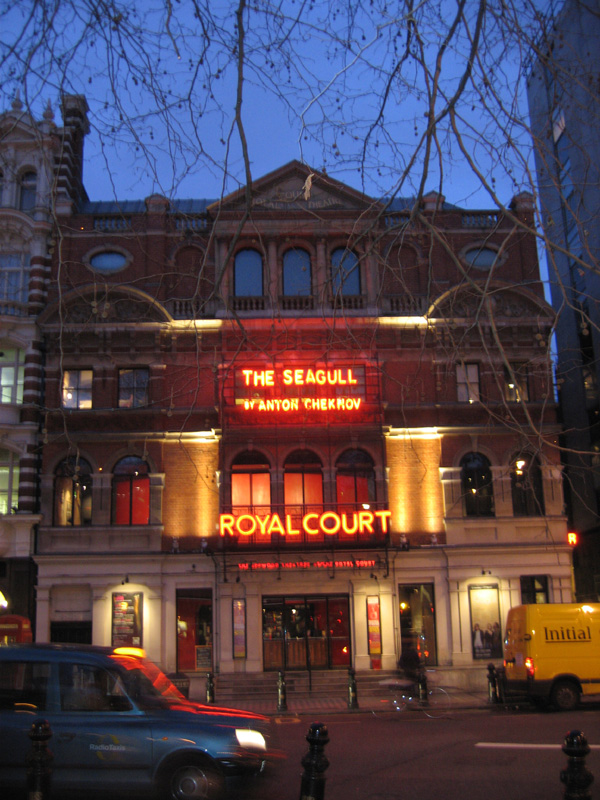
The Royal Court Theatre at dusk in 2007

Though the main auditorium and the façade were attractive, the remainder of the building provided poor facilities for both audience and performers, and throughout the 20th century the stalls and understage often flooded. By the early 1990s the building had deteriorated dangerously, and the theatre was threatened with closure in 1995. The Royal Court received a grant of £16.2 million from the National Lottery and the Arts Council for redevelopment, and beginning in 1996, under the artistic directorship of Stephen Daldry, it was completely rebuilt, except for the façade and the intimate auditorium. The architects for this were Haworth Tompkins. The theatre reopened in February 2000, with the 380-seat Jerwood Theatre Downstairs, and the 85-seat studio theatre, now the Jerwood Theatre Upstairs. Since 1994, a new generation of playwrights debuting at the theatre has included Joe Penhall, Sarah Kane, Mark Ravenhill, and Roy Williams, among others.

=== 1990s and later ===
Since the 1990s the Royal Court has placed an emphasis on the development and production of international plays. By 1993, the British Council had begun its support of the International Residency programme (which started in 1989 as the Royal Court International Summer School), and more recently the Genesis Foundation has also supported the production of international plays. The theatre received a 1999 International Theatre Institute award. In May 2008, the English Stage Company presented The Ugly One by Marius von Mayenburg at the "Contact International Theatre Festival" in Poland.

Artistic Directors have included George Devine (1956–1965), William Gaskill (1965–1972), Lindsay Anderson and Anthony Page (1969–1972), Oscar Lewenstein (1972–1975), Nicholas Wright and Robert Kidd (1975–1977), Stuart Burge (1977–1979), Max Stafford-Clark (1979–1992), Stephen Daldry (1992–1998), Ian Rickson (1998–2006) and Dominic Cooke (2007 to 2012). Vicky Featherstone was the first female artistic director (2013–2024). David Byrne took over the role in early 2024.

In 1999, the theatre was awarded the "Europe Prize Theatrical Realities". The prize organization stated:

[T]he Royal Court Theatre ... has done more than any other institution to promote new writing. Since 1956 it has premiered the work of many of the best-known British dramatists: Osborne, Wesker, Pinter, Bond, Barker, Brenton, Hare and Churchill. But this Award is given not so much for the Court's distinguished history as for its championship ... of [a] new generation of challenging, often profoundly disturbing, writers ... like Sarah Kane (Blasted and Cleansed), Mark Ravenhill (Shopping and Fucking) and Jez Butterworth (Mojo) [and] presented outstanding plays by young Irish writers such as Conor McPherson and Martin McDonagh. It ... has given voice to a new generation of young writers whose moral anger, urban despair and political disillusion have sent shockwaves throughout the whole of Europe.

== Antisemitism accusations ==
In 1987, Ken Loach's production of Perdition at the Royal Court Theatre was abandoned after protests and commissioned reviews from two historians, Martin Gilbert and David Cesarani. Oxford historian Gilbert said the play was "a travesty of the facts" and "deeply antisemitic". Loach and the play's author, Jim Allen, denied the accusations and accused the "Zionist lobby" and "the Zionist machine" of stirring up controversy unfairly.

Caryl Churchill's play Seven Jewish Children played at the theatre in 2009. Many Jewish leaders and journalists criticised the play as antisemitic. One called it "a libellous and despicable demonisation of Israeli parents and grandparents" and a modern blood libel drawing on old antisemitic myths. Michael Billington in The Guardian described the play as "a heartfelt lamentation for the future generations" and contended that the play, though controversial, is not antisemitic. Another Guardian writer viewed Seven Jewish Children as historically inaccurate and harshly critical of Jews. The Royal Court denied the accusations, saying: "In keeping with its philosophy, the Royal Court Theatre presents a multiplicity of viewpoints."

In November 2021, the theatre renamed the lead character of the play Rare Earth Mettle by Al Smith from "Hershel Fink" to "Henry Finn" following criticism of perpetuating antisemitic stereotypes. The theatre also made an apology.

== Safeguarding inquiry ==
In 2018, the theatre co-commissioned an independent inquiry, in collaboration with the Royal Exchange Theatre, following safeguarding concerns raised within the UK theatre sector. These concerns were prompted in part by allegations of abuse involving playwright and director Chris Goode, whose work had been staged at both institutions. The inquiry produced a set of recommendations aimed at improving safeguarding practices across theatre organisations, but the Royal Court did not publicly outline its response or any actions taken in relation to the findings.

== Notable productions since the 1950s ==
=== 1950s–1970s ===
- Look Back in Anger by John Osborne, directed by Tony Richardson, music for songs by Tom Eastwood, starring Kenneth Haigh (1956)
- The Entertainer by John Osborne, directed by Tony Richardson, starring Laurence Olivier (1957)
- The Knack by Ann Jellicoe (1962)
- Exit the King by Eugène Ionesco, directed by George Devine, starring Alec Guinness (1963)
- A Patriot for Me by John Osborne (1965)
- Saved by Edward Bond, directed by William Gaskill (1965)
- Owners by Caryl Churchill (1972)
- The Rocky Horror Show with music, lyrics and book by Richard O'Brien, directed by Jim Sharman (1973)
- Not I by Samuel Beckett (1973)
- Class Enemy by Nigel Williams (1978)
- Bent by Martin Sherman (1979)

=== 1980s–1990s ===
- Top Girls by Caryl Churchill (1982)
- Road by Jim Cartwright (1986)
- Our Country's Good by Timberlake Wertenbaker, adapted from the Thomas Keneally novel The Playmaker (1988)
- Death and the Maiden by Ariel Dorfman, directed by Lindsay Posner, starring Juliet Stevenson (1991)
- Hysteria by Terry Johnson, directed by Phyllida Lloyd (1993)
- My Night with Reg by Kevin Elyot, directed by Roger Michell (1994)
- Blasted by Sarah Kane, directed by James Macdonald (1995)
- Mojo by Jez Butterworth, directed by Ian Rickson (1995)
- Shopping and Fucking by Mark Ravenhill, directed by Max Stafford-Clark (1996)
- The Weir by Conor McPherson, directed by Ian Rickson (1997)
- Cleansed by Sarah Kane, directed by James Macdonald (1998)

=== 2000s–2010s ===
- Dublin Carol by Conor McPherson, directed by Ian Rickson, starring Brian Cox (2000)
- 4.48 Psychosis by Sarah Kane, directed by James Macdonald (2000)
- Crave by Sarah Kane, directed by Vicky Featherstone (2001)
- The Sugar Syndrome by Lucy Prebble, directed by Marianne Elliott (2003)
- Drunk Enough to Say I Love You? by Caryl Churchill, directed by James Macdonald (2006)
- The Seagull by Anton Chekhov, in a new version by Christopher Hampton, directed by Ian Rickson, starring Kristin Scott Thomas, Mackenzie Crook and Chiwetel Ejiofor (2007)
- That Face by Polly Stenham, directed by Jeremy Herrin, starring Felicity Jones, Matt Smith, Julian Wadham, and Lindsay Duncan (2007)
- Jerusalem by Jez Butterworth, directed by Ian Rickson, starring Mark Rylance and Mackenzie Crook (2009)
- Seven Jewish Children by Caryl Churchill, directed by Dominic Cooke, starring Ben Caplan, David Horovitch, Daisy Lewis, Ruth Posner, Samuel Roukin, Susannah Wise and Alexis Zegerman (2009)
- Posh by Laura Wade, starring Simon Sheperd, Joshua McGuire, Daniel Ryan, Richard Goulding, Kit Harington, Harry Hadden-Paton, Leo Bill, David Dawson, James Norton, Henry Lloyd-Hughes, Tom Mison, Fiona Button and Charlotte Lucas (2010)
- Spur of the Moment by Anya Reiss, directed by Jeremy Herrin (2010)
- Hangmen by Martin McDonagh, directed by Matthew Dunster, starring Johnny Flynn and David Morrissey (2015)
- The Ferryman by Jez Butterworth, directed by Sam Mendes, starring Paddy Considine, Laura Donnelly, Genevieve O'Reilly, Bríd Brennan, Fra Fee, Stuart Graham, Gerard Horan, Conor MacNeill, Dearbhla Molloy, Tom Glynn-Carney, and Niall Wright (2017)

=== 2020s-present ===
- For Black Boys Who Have Considered Suicide When The Hue Gets Too Heavy written and directed by Ryan Calais Cameron (2022)
- Giant by Mark Rosenblatt, directed by Nicholas Hytner, starring John Lithgow, Elliott Levy, Romala Garai, Rachel Stirling, and Richard Hope (2024)
- John Proctor Is the Villain by Kimberly Belflower, directed by Danya Taymor, starring Sadie Soverall, Dónal Finn, Holly Howden Gilchrist, and Lauren Ajufo (2026)
- Krapp's Last Tape by Samuel Beckett, directed by and starring Gary Oldman (2026)

== Sources– ==
- Ainger, Michael (2002). Gilbert and Sullivan – A Dual Biography. Oxford: Oxford University Press. ISBN 0-19-514769-3.
- Roberts, Philip (1999). The Royal Court Theatre and the modern stage. Cambridge, UK: Cambridge University Press. ISBN 0-521-47962-2.
