= Anybody's Nightmare =

2001 British TV drama programme

- Genre: Crime drama
- Written by: John Flanagan; Andrew McCulloch
- Directed by: Tristram Powell
- Starring: Patricia Routledge; Georgina Sutcliffe; Thomas Arnold; Jean Ainslie; David Calder; Malcolm Sinclair; William Armstrong; Nicola Redmond
- Country of origin: United Kingdom
- Original language: English
- No. of episodes: 1

Production
- Executive producer: Sharon Bloom
- Producers: Ken Baker; Stephen Smallwood
- Cinematography: Chris O'Dell
- Editor: Jamie McCoan
- Running time: 97 minutes
- Production company: Carlton Television

Original release
- Network: ITV
- Release: 7 October 2001

Anybody's Nightmare is a British television crime drama, based on the true story of the imprisonment of Sheila Bowler, that was broadcast on ITV on 7 October 2001. Patricia Routledge starred as Bowler, a 62-year-old music teacher who in 1993 was wrongly arrested, tried and convicted for the murder of her husband's 89-year-old aunt Florence Jackson, who in 1992 had drowned in the River Brede in East Sussex. The film chronicles the investigation and trial, and her subsequent four years' detention in Holloway Prison and Bullwood Hall Prison before her successful appeal in 1998.

The film depicts the quest for justice undertaken by Sheila's children, Simon (Thomas Arnold) and Jane (Georgina Sutcliffe), who were helped by a friend of the family, Angela Devlin (Nicola Redmond); Devlin's book on the case, published in 1998, was the basis for the film. The cast includes David Calder as prosecution barrister Anthony Glass QC, Malcolm Sinclair as Nicholas Purnell QC, and William Armstrong as Jeremy Roberts QC, Bowler's defence lawyers. The initial broadcast of the film drew 9.11 million viewers.

== Plot ==
Sheila Bowler (Patricia Routledge) is a 62-year-old music teacher living in Rye, East Sussex. One weekend, she goes to collect her late husband's aunt, Florence Jackson (Jean Ainslie), from the care home where she is living. On the drive back home, Sheila's car suffers a puncture. She makes the decision to leave Florence in the car to walk to a nearby cottage to call for help. Upon her return, Sheila discovers that Florence has disappeared. The police are called, but despite an overnight search, no trace of Florence is discovered. Early the next day, divers pull a body from the nearby River Brede, which is confirmed to be that of Florence.

The much younger police inspectors in charge of the case seemingly find suspicion in every one of Sheila's actions, from her lack of concern while phoning for help to her cleaning her shoes after returning home to her not signing in at the care home when she picked up Auntie Flo. Sheila's lawyers, also much younger, advise her to refuse to answer any questions whatsoever in police questioning, a tactic which only spurs the case to trial. In court, Sheila is unprepared for aggressive cross-examination and is subsequently found guilty.

In prison, Sheila takes advantage of the wardens' discomfort with her age to leverage better working conditions and eventually becomes friends with some of the inmates, who take to calling her "super-gran". Meanwhile, her children reconnect with an old friend who advises them to do their own homework on the appeals process and to find better lawyers. Their efforts eventually lead to media attention for Sheila's case and the appeal goes forward.

At the appeal, Sheila and her lawyers are better prepared and make a more convincing case. When the receptionist of the care home reveals details about Auntie Flo that sink the prosecution's original argument, Sheila is finally freed.

== Cast ==
- Patricia Routledge as Sheila Bowler
- Georgina Sutcliffe as Jane Bowler
- Thomas Arnold as Simon Bowler
- Jean Ainslie as Florence "Aunt Flo" Jackson
- David Calder as Anthony Glass, QC
- Malcolm Sinclair as Nicholas Purnell, QC
- William Armstrong as Jeremy Roberts, QC
- Nicola Redmond as Angela Devlin
- Albert Welling as Ewen Smith
- Scott Baker as DS Renno
- Louisa Millwood-Haigh as WDS Booth
- Anne Carroll as Valerie Nye
- Michael Culver as Lord Chief Justice Bingham
- Peter Halliday as Lord Justice Swinton Thomas
- Rashid Karapiet as Dr. Jeelani
- Valerie Lilley as Mrs. Dobson
