= Ladies of Letters =

British media series

Ladies of Letters is a comedy series that ran for 13 years on BBC Radio 4; based on the series of books of the same name written by Carole Hayman and Lou Wakefield, and starring Patricia Routledge and Prunella Scales. Routledge stars as Vera Small and Scales as Irene Spencer, two women in their early 60s who share a sometimes rocky relationship conducted by correspondence.

The success of the first series of Ladies of Letters (broadcast in 1997) spawned adaptations of several sequels: Ladies of More Letters (1999); Ladies of Letters.Com (2000); Ladies of Letters Log On (2001); Ladies of Letters Make Mincemeat (2001 Christmas Special); Ladies of Letters Spring Clean (2004); Ladies of Letters Go Global (2006); Ladies of Letters Say No (2007); Ladies of Letters Go Green (2008); Ladies of Letters Crunch Credit (2009) and Ladies of Letters Go Crackers (2010 - this series features Anne Reid instead of Patricia Routledge as Vera Small, see below).

Each of the 15-minute episodes comes as part of BBC Radio 4's long running magazine programme Woman's Hour. A ten-part television adaptation of the first radio series was made for ITV3, which began on 3 February 2009.

== Plot and principals ==
Vera and Irene reveal their exploits and adventures to each other in their letters and e-mails, but sometimes their correspondence becomes fractious when one accuses the other of being an alcoholic or engages in too much one-upmanship. Nevertheless, when the chips are down and the going gets tough, each is instantly there for the other, like a charge of the cavalry but with a more sarcastic bugle call.

Other recurring characters include people we occasionally hear, as well as some we only hear about:

- Howard Small ("Howie"), Vera's gay son, who runs a sheep farm near the village of Great Shagthorn with his business and personal partner, Anthony Flowers ("Ants"). Howie and Ants have a daughter, "Small-Flowers" currently known as "Flo";
- Karen, Vera's daughter, with whom she has a difficult relationship. Karen's second husband, St. John (pronounced "sinjun"), is a veterinarian with whom Vera has an excellent relationship. St. John is also revealed to be the biological father of Baby Small-Flowers. Karen and St. John have two children together: the long-legged Nelson and Millie (so-named after her premature arrival around the time of the new "Minnellium" [sic]);
- Sabrina Small, Karen's daughter whose father is never mentioned. Karen was married and divorced prior to Sabrina's birth.
- Lesley, Irene's daughter, who lives in Australia with her second husband Brian and their two children, Cheryl-Marie (from Lesley's first marriage ('Cheryl' pronounced 'CHAIR-ull') and Bubbles (real name: Sarah-Jane). Brian has a squint Lesley finds embarrassing, and a too-obvious hair-transplant;
- Christopher Thoroughgood, Irene's long-lost son, Lesley's elder half-brother. Christopher is the result of an "illicit and unwanted infringement" of Irene's maidenhood and was put up for adoption. Christopher's first wife was Margaret and they had two sons, "Little Christopher" and Tommy. Christopher's second wife is Michaela, who appears, with their baby daughter Sophie-Irene, out of the blue in Ladies of Letters Crunch Credit;
- Youssou, Vera's "adoptive grandson", a former child soldier in Panglawangla, whom she brought back with her from her 'Global' adventure;
- Beryl "next door", who was Irene's neighbour and has recurrent medical problems with her bottom;
- Nellie Thoroughgood, Christopher's adoptive mother. She is played by Susan Jameson for her sole appearance in Ladies of Letters Go Global, in which she calls herself Nellie Havergood. No reason is given for the difference in surname.

Vera and Irene always strive to outdo each other, whether with their recipes, holiday destinations or who has the best grandchildren. The humour is mostly derived from the lack of insight of the two main protagonists, but there is also a somewhat melancholic theme that lurks just beneath the surface at the way these two women are taken for granted by their respective families. By the end of 2004's Ladies of Letters Spring Clean it is implied that there has been something of a parting of the ways between the women and their kinfolk. Later series tend to heavily use malapropisms for comic effect.

Ladies of Letters Go Global (broadcast 2 to 6 January 2006) featured a somewhat bizarre and unlikely world tour undertaken by the two women, in contrast to the more naturalistic tone of previous stories. The BBC issued a CD collection of the first seven series as a special 'biscuit tin' release in October 2006. A short, newly written, episode was featured as part of the Woman's Hour 60th Anniversary concert in October 2006.

Ladies of Letters Say No was broadcast from 27 to 31 August 2007 and featured a broadly satirical take on the involvement of the private sector in the NHS, concentrating on the underhand dealings of the tycoon Alan Trumper. Ladies of Letters Go Green – the ninth series – was broadcast from 10 to 14 March 2008. Series 10 – Ladies of Letters Crunch Credit – was broadcast from 4 to 8 May 2009.

An eleventh radio series Ladies of Letters Go Crackers was broadcast at Christmas 2010 (27–31 December). Patricia Routledge was not available at the time of recording so Anne Reid, who plays Vera on television, stepped into the role.

== Television series ==
A ten-part television adaptation of the first radio series was made by Tiger Aspect for ITV3, which ran from on 3 February 2009. It stars Maureen Lipman as Irene and Anne Reid as Vera. A second series was aired in two parts, the first airing in April 2010 and the second in October 2010.

== Home media ==
Series one was released on DVD Region 2 in 2009 followed by series two in 2010.

== Book details ==
- Ladies of Letters (ISBN 978-1853757303)
- More "Ladies of Letters" (ISBN 0-233-99926-4)
- Ladies of Letters.com (ISBN 0-7515-3189-8)
- Ladies of Letters Log On (ISBN 0-7515-3219-3)
- Ladies of Letters Make Mincemeat (ISBN 0-563-49495-6)
- Ladies of Letters Spring Clean (ISBN 0-563-52300-X)
- Ladies of Letters Go Global (ISBN 0-563-50440-4)
- Ladies of Letters Say No (ISBN 1405-67726-0)
- Ladies of Letters Go Green (ISBN 1405-68746-0)
- Ladies of Letters Crunch Credit (ISBN 1408-40961-5)
- Ladies of Letters Go Crackers (ISBN 1408-46714-3)
