= Carole Hayman =

English writer, broadcaster, actor and director

Carole Hayman is an English writer, broadcaster, actor and director. She was born in Kent, and attended Leeds University and the Bristol Old Vic Theatre School. She has been an actress and theatre director and was an associate director at the Royal Court Theatre in the late eighties. She was married to Max Stafford-Clark, the director of the theatre during some of that period. During that time she appeared in many of Caryl Churchill's plays including, Cloud Nine and Top Girls. As Associate Director, she directed plays by Sarah Daniels, Andrea Dunbar, G. E. Newman, Fay Weldon and Sue Townsend, including Ripen our Darkness and Byrthrite by Sarah Daniels and Bazaar and Rummage and The Great Celestial Cow by Sue Townsend. She has published many comic and satirical novels and written radio and TV series for the BBC, ITV and Channel Four. These include Ladies of Letters (co-written with Lou Wakefield) and The Refuge and The Spinney (co-written with Sue Townsend).

== Books ==
- The Warfleet Chronicles (2026) published by Deal Museum
- Connections (2002), published online at sealit.org
- Hard Choices (2001) published online. Later published in hard copy by Aurora Metro.
- Cuddling Sharks (2001) published online
- One to Watch (2001) published online
- Ladies of Letters (series of books and BBC Radio 4 eleven comedy series. ITV three TV series)
  - Ladies of Letters (2000) Granada Media
  - More Ladies of Letters (2000) Granada Media
  - Ladies of Letters.com (2001, Little, Brown)
  - Ladies of Letters Log On (2002)
- The Rashomon Principle (2000)
- Missing (1998) Gollancz
- Greed, Crime, Sudden Death (1998) Gollancz
- Ciaou Kim (1989)
- All The Best Kim (1988) HarperCollins

== Television ==
She played Mrs Godber in "The Veiled Lady", S2:E2 of ITV's Agatha Christie's Poirot, January 14, 1990.

== Opera ==
- The Rotters Opera (2024)
- The Hive (2025)

== Podcasts ==
Thoroughly Good Music
