= The Magistrate (play) =

1885 play by Arthur Wing Pinero

Arthur Cecil as Mr Posket in the original 1885 production

The Magistrate is a farce by English playwright Arthur Wing Pinero. It concerns a respectable magistrate who finds himself caught up in scandalous events that threaten to disgrace him.

The first production opened at the Court Theatre in London on 21 March 1885. It was Pinero's first attempt at farce, after several dramas, and took audiences and critics by surprise. It was very favourably reviewed, and became a box-office hit, running for a year until 24 March 1886.

In 1917 it was adapted as a musical comedy that ran in London for 801 performances under the title The Boy. The plot was unchanged, but the characters received new names. In 1934, it was adapted for the screen as Those Were the Days, starring Will Hay.

== Original cast ==
- Mr. Poskett – Arthur Cecil
- Mr. Bullamy – Fred Cape
- Colonel Lukyn – John Clayton
- Captain Horace Vale – F. Kerr
- Cis Farringdon – H. Eversfield
- Achille Blond, proprietor of the Hôtel des Princes – Mr. Chevalier
- Isidore, a waiter – Mr. Deane
- Mr. Wormington, chief clerk at Mulberry Street Court – Gilbert Trent
- Inspector Messiter – Albert Sims
- Sergeant Lugg – William Lugg
- Constable Harris – Mr. Burnley
- Wyke, a servant at Mr. Posket's – Mr. Fayre
- Agatha Poskett, late Farringdon, née Verrinder – Mrs. John Wood
- Charlotte Verrinder, Mrs Posket's sister – Marion Terry
- Beatie Tomlinson – Miss Norreys
- Popham – Miss La Coste

== Synopsis ==
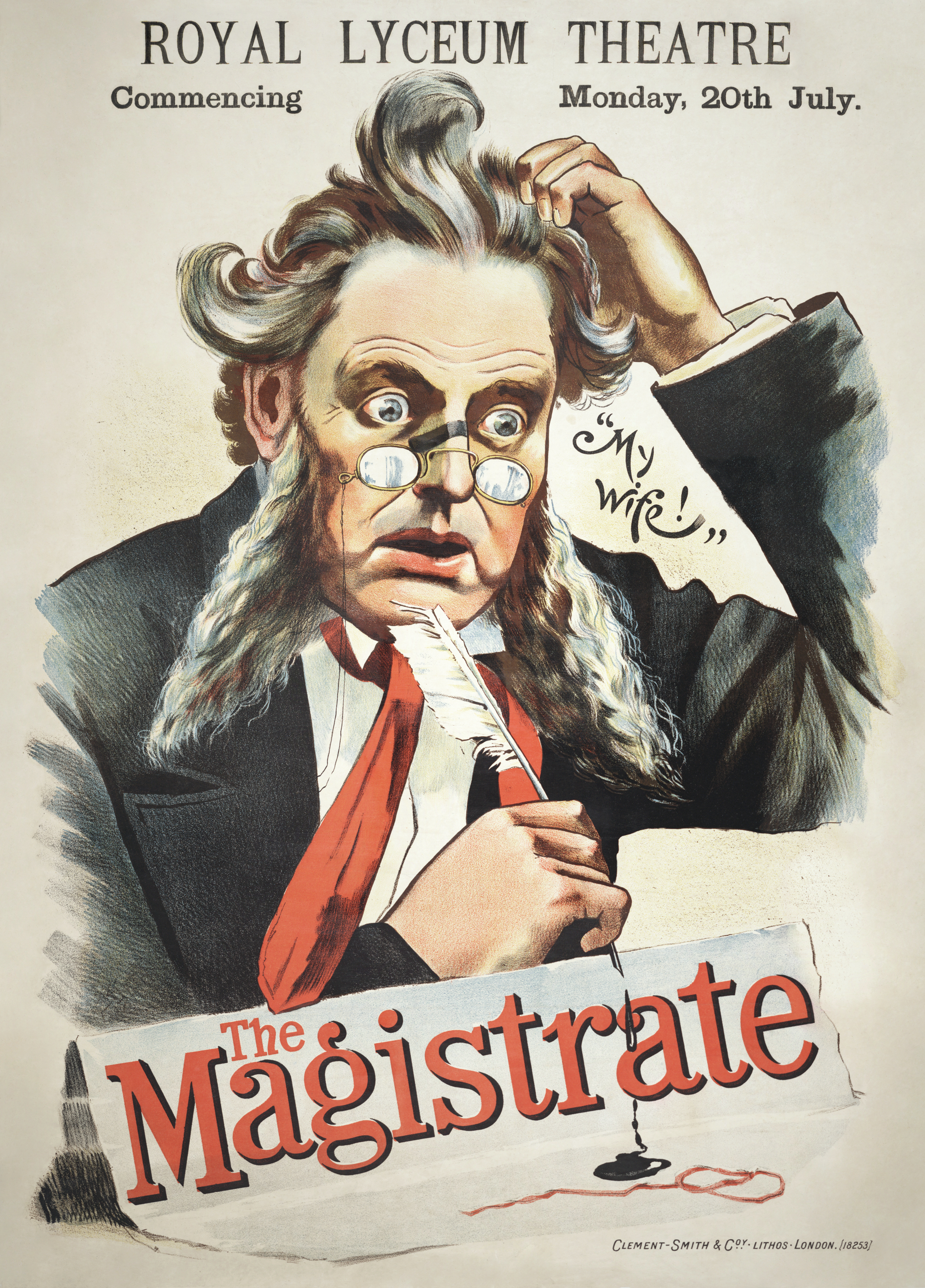
Theatre poster from a performance at the Royal Lyceum Theatre, Edinburgh in 1886

=== Act I ===
At Mr. Posket's, Bloomsbury
Some years before the play begins, Mr. Posket, a London magistrate, married a widow, Agatha Farringdon. At the time she had pretended to be 31 rather than her true age, which was 36. Accordingly, she found that she needed also to knock five years off the supposed age of her son by her first marriage, Cis Farringdon. When the play opens, the Poskets are preparing to entertain to dinner the following day an old friend of Posket, Colonel Lukyn. The Colonel knew Mrs. Posket in her earlier days, and is Cis's godfather. He is well aware of Mrs. Posket's true age. Fearful that the Colonel may be indiscreet about dates, she slips out that evening to see him privately. She takes with her her sister Charlotte who is staying with the Poskets for a few days, getting over a broken engagement.

Agatha's son Cis takes advantage of his mother's absence. Although he is supposed to be 14, he is in fact 19 without knowing it, and his precocity is far in advance of his supposed age. He smokes, he flirts, he gambles, and now, as soon as his mother has left, he coolly proposes to his staid stepfather that they should go to the Hôtel des Princes, where he has a room. Posket allows himself to be persuaded.

=== Act II ===
Room in the Hôtel des Princes, Meek Street
Greatly to his surprise Posket finds himself "making a night of it". Colonel Lukyn has also arranged to dine at the Hôtel des Princes, with his friend Captain Horace Vale. The latter is the man who has broken Charlotte's heart, throwing her over in a fit of jealousy. When Agatha and Charlotte arrive to see the Colonel, there is a lengthy reconciliation scene between Vale and Charlotte. Equally lengthy are the carousings of Posket and Cis in the adjoining room – so much so that a breach of the licensing laws is committed and the police arrive to search the house.

The landlord, having put out the lights, brings all his law-breaking guests into one room and bids them conceal themselves as best they can. Posket and his wife hide under the same table, each unaware of the other's identity. When the police burst in, Posket and Cis make a dash to the balcony, which collapses under their weight, depositing them in the street below. The others are all taken into custody.

Posket and Cis, with the police in pursuit, run through muddy streets, scramble over spiked fences into sloppy ditches, out of London and into the suburbs. In the chase they are separated.

=== Act III ===
The magistrate arrives at his court: photograph of the 1917 musical version, called The Boy.

Scene I – The magistrates' room, Mulberry Street
Posket staggers back to London just in time to perform his magisterial duties at Mulberry Street court. He is tattered, bruised and dirty. He pretends to be much shocked when the chief clerk tells him that the first case he has to hear involves his friend Lukyn. Despite Lukyn's appeal, Posket permits no favours, and insists that the case must be tried in the normal way. He puts on a show of moral outrage when Lukyn tells him that there are ladies in the case. On going into court, Posket is so shocked to find his wife in the dock that he finds himself, in a trance-like state, sentencing her to seven days' imprisonment without the option of a fine.

Scene II – At Mr. Posket's again
Posket's excessive sentence of his wife and the other guests at the hotel is over-ruled on a technicality by Posket's fellow magistrate, Bullamy. Back at home, Posket feels the force of his wife's indignation, but she cannot avoid explaining her presence at the hotel, and the truth about her deception about her age comes out. He forgives her.

== Critical reception ==
The Times said that for "deftness of construction, ingenuity and genuine fun" the play was the equal of any French farce, and said that it made the public laugh until their sides ache. The Era said "the fun is fast and furious … ingeniously constructed … supremely bright and comical."

== Revivals ==
The play has been frequently revived. Productions include those at Terry's Theatre in 1892; the Arts Theatre, 1943; St Martin's Theatre in 1944; and The Old Vic in 1959. Another was at the Cambridge Theatre, London, from 18 September 1969, starring Alastair Sim as Mr. Posket, Patricia Routledge as Agatha Posket, Michael Aldridge as Captain Vale, Renée Asherson as Charlotte, Robert Coote as Colonel Lukyn and Tamara Ustinov as Beatie Tomlinson. A 1982 production at Boston University starred Brian Hargrove. A more recent London revival, starring Ian Richardson as Posket, was at the Savoy Theatre in 1997.

Between 14 November 2012 and 10 February 2013, a production of The Magistrate was presented at the National Theatre in London, and streamed live to cinemas across the UK. Directed by Timothy Sheader, the production featured John Lithgow in the title role opposite Nancy Carroll.
