= Arthur Cecil =

British actor, comedian and theatre manager (1843–1896)

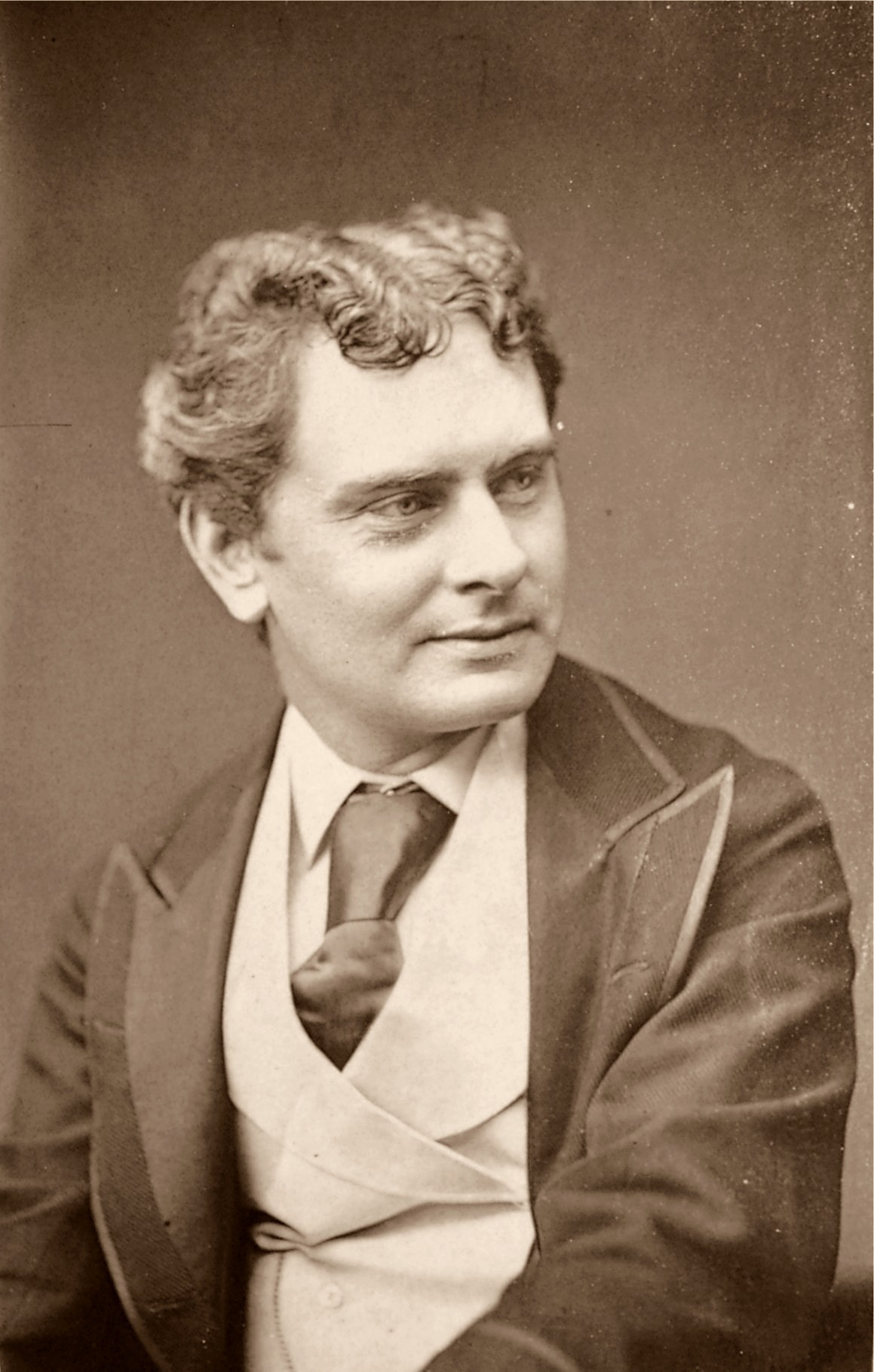
Arthur Cecil

Arthur Cecil Blunt (1 June 1843 – 16 April 1896), better known as Arthur Cecil, was an English actor, comedian, playwright and theatre manager. He is probably best remembered for playing the role of Box in the long-running production of Cox and Box, by Arthur Sullivan and F. C. Burnand, at the Royal Gallery of Illustration.

Born in London, Cecil took up amateur dramatics at an early age. In 1869, he made his professional debut in the one-act comic opera Cox and Box at the Gallery of Illustration in the role of Mr. Box, a part that became his signature role. There Cecil started a successful association with the German Reed Entertainments, appearing in numerous comedies, farces, operettas and burlesques, such as Beggar My Neighbour: A Blind Man's Bouffe and Charity Begins at Home in 1872. He remained with the company for five years.

Cecil appeared at many London theatres during his career including the Globe, the Gaiety, and Prince of Wales's Theatre. He appeared in such successful pieces as Peril as Sir Woodbine Grafton, Duty, The Vicarage, as Noel Haygarth and Caste by T. W. Robertson with the Bancrofts also in the cast, all in 1879, and later in other Robertson pieces. Cecil joined a company at the Royal Court Theatre in 1881 and was a co-manager of that theatre from 1883. There, he played in farces including The Rector, The Magistrate, The Schoolmistress and Dandy Dick, as well as the title role in The Cabinet Minister in 1890. Later productions there included The Millionaire, as Mr. Guyon, and Mamma, as Miles Henniker.

== Biography ==
Cecil was born in Mayfair, Westminster, London, England. His parents were Joseph Blunt, a solicitor, and Mary Blunt, née James. He studied for the legal profession, but he acted in amateur theatricals, and decided to pursue acting instead.

=== Early career ===
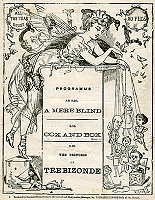
Cecil played Mr. Box in this 1874 production

Cecil began performing as an amateur at the Richmond Theatre. In 1867, he appeared in the role of Bouncer in an amateur production of the one-act comic opera, Cox and Box by F. C. Burnand and Arthur Sullivan. Coincidentally, on Easter Monday 1869, Cecil made his professional debut at the Gallery of Illustration in a bill that included Cox and Box, this time as Mr. Box. The first piece on the bill was W. S. Gilbert's No Cards, in which he played Mr Churchmouse. Thereafter, Cecil often played Box in productions of Cox and Box.

This was Cecil's first appearance in a German Reed Entertainment, and he remained steadily with the German Reeds for five years thereafter. With that company, he appeared in numerous comedies, farces, operettas and burlesques, such as Beggar My Neighbour: A Blind Man's Bouffe adapted by Burnand from Les deux aveugles by Jacques Offenbach (1870) and Charity Begins at Home (1872) by Alfred Cellier and B. C. Stephenson. After No Cards, he appeared in other Gilbert works at the Gallery, including Ages Ago (1869), Our Island Home (1870), A Sensation Novel (1871) and Happy Arcadia (1872). He also wrote some works for the German Reeds, including Dora's Dream (1873), in which he also performed, at St. George's Hall.

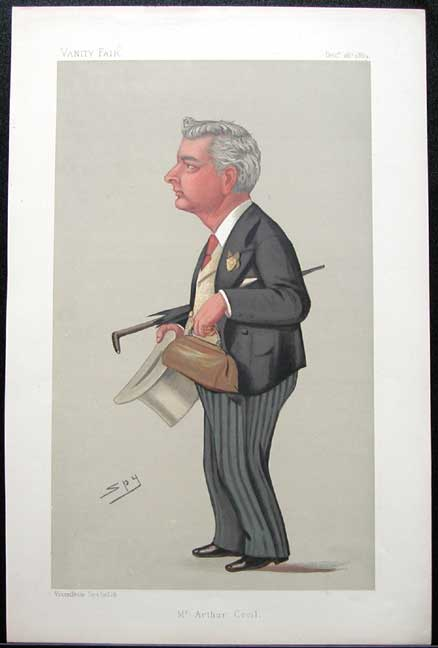
Cartoon of Cecil from Spy

Cecil joined the company at the Globe Theatre later in 1874, playing in such works as Gilbert's Committed for Trial, as Jonathan Wagstaff and Wig and Gown by James Albery, as Mr Justice Jones. In September, Cecil was at the Gaiety Theatre, London, reprising his role in Cox and Box opposite the composer's brother, Fred Sullivan, as Box. The next year, he was back at the Gaiety in The Merry Wives of Windsor as Dr. Caius; and at the Opera Comique, in As You Like It, as Touchstone, in The School for Scandal as Sir Peter Teazle, and in She Stoops to Conquer, as Tony Lumpkin. In 1876, he was back at the Globe. There, he originated the role of Dr. Downward in Miss Gwilt by Wilkie Collins. He was at the Prince of Wales's Theatre during the following three years. There, he played in many pieces, including Peril by Saville Rowe and B. C. Stephenson, as Sir Woodbine Grafton (together with the Bancrofts); Duty by Albery; The Vicarage, as Noel Haygarth; and Caste by T. W. Robertson (with the Bancrofts), as Sam Gerridge, all in 1879. The Bancrofts moved to the Haymarket Theatre in 1880, and Cecil went with them, appearing in Lord Bulwer-Lytton's Money, as Mr. Graves. He then played in other Robertson comedies at the Comedy Theatre, including Society and Ours.

=== Later years ===
Beginning in 1881, Cecil joined the company at the Royal Court Theatre. From 1883, he was co-manager, with John Clayton, of that theatre. There, he played in a number of farces by A. W. Pinero, including The Rector, as Connor Hennessy; The Magistrate (1885), as Mr. Posket; The Schoolmistress (1886), as Vere Queckett; Dandy Dick (1887), as Blore, the butler; and in the title role of The Cabinet Minister (1890) He also appeared there in G. W. Godfrey's The Millionaire, as Mr. Guyon, and created the role of Miles Henniker in Sydney Grundy's Mamma (1888). Cecil and Clayton yielded management at the Court to Mrs. John Wood and Arthur Chudleigh when the theatre closed in 1887, although Cecil continued acting at the theatre after it was rebuilt.

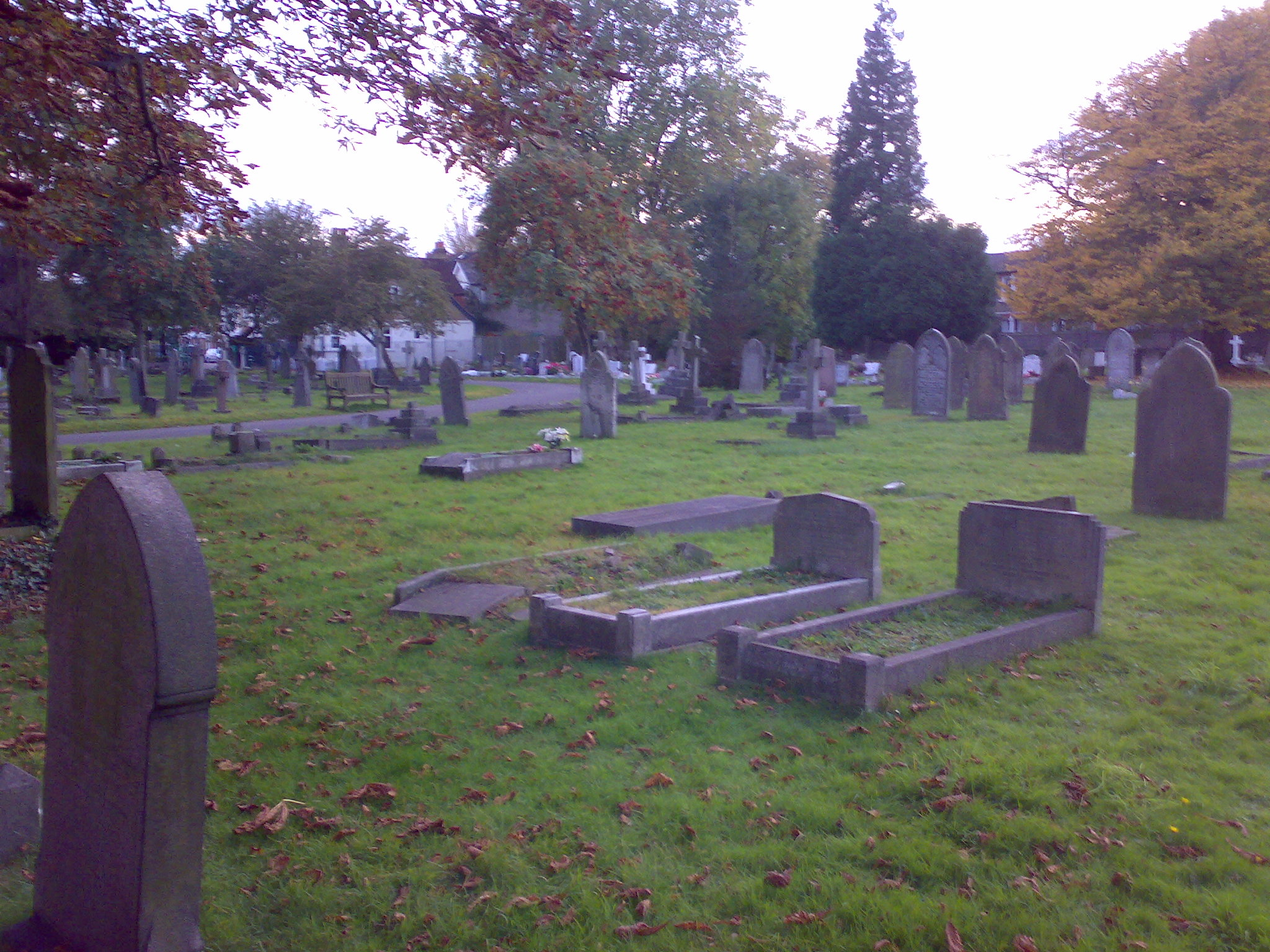
The Old Mortlake Burial Ground where Cecil is buried

Cecil played the title role in Pickwick by Burnand, with music by Edward Solomon, at the Comedy Theatre in 1889 and Lord Burnham in The Crusaders, a comedy by Henry Arthur Jones at the Avenue Theatre in 1891. In 1893, he appeared as Baron Stein in Diplomacy by Clement Scott and B. C. Stephenson with the Bancrofts at the Garrick Theatre. In 1894, he was again in Money with the Bancrofts at the Comedy. He continued acting in plays and musical pieces, mostly at the Court Theatre, and sometimes at the Comedy, Globe, Avenue and other houses, often reprising one of his successful roles. In 1895 at the Court, he made one of his last successes in Vanity Fair by G. W. Godfrey.

Throughout his career, Cecil wrote comedy sketches such as "Bright Idea" (1881) with composer Arthur Law, and songs, some of which became popular or were interpolated into musical theatre pieces, such as Little Jack Sheppard (1885). He supplemented his income by entertaining at private events and parties.

Cecil died on 16 April 1896 at Brighton at the age of 52 and was buried at the Old Mortlake Burial Ground, then in the Municipal Borough of Barnes, Surrey and now maintained by the London Borough of Richmond upon Thames. An official notice relating to his estate described him as "late of Clarence-chambers Haymarket and the Garrick Club London, Comedian".
