= Mrs. John Wood =

English actress and theatre manager

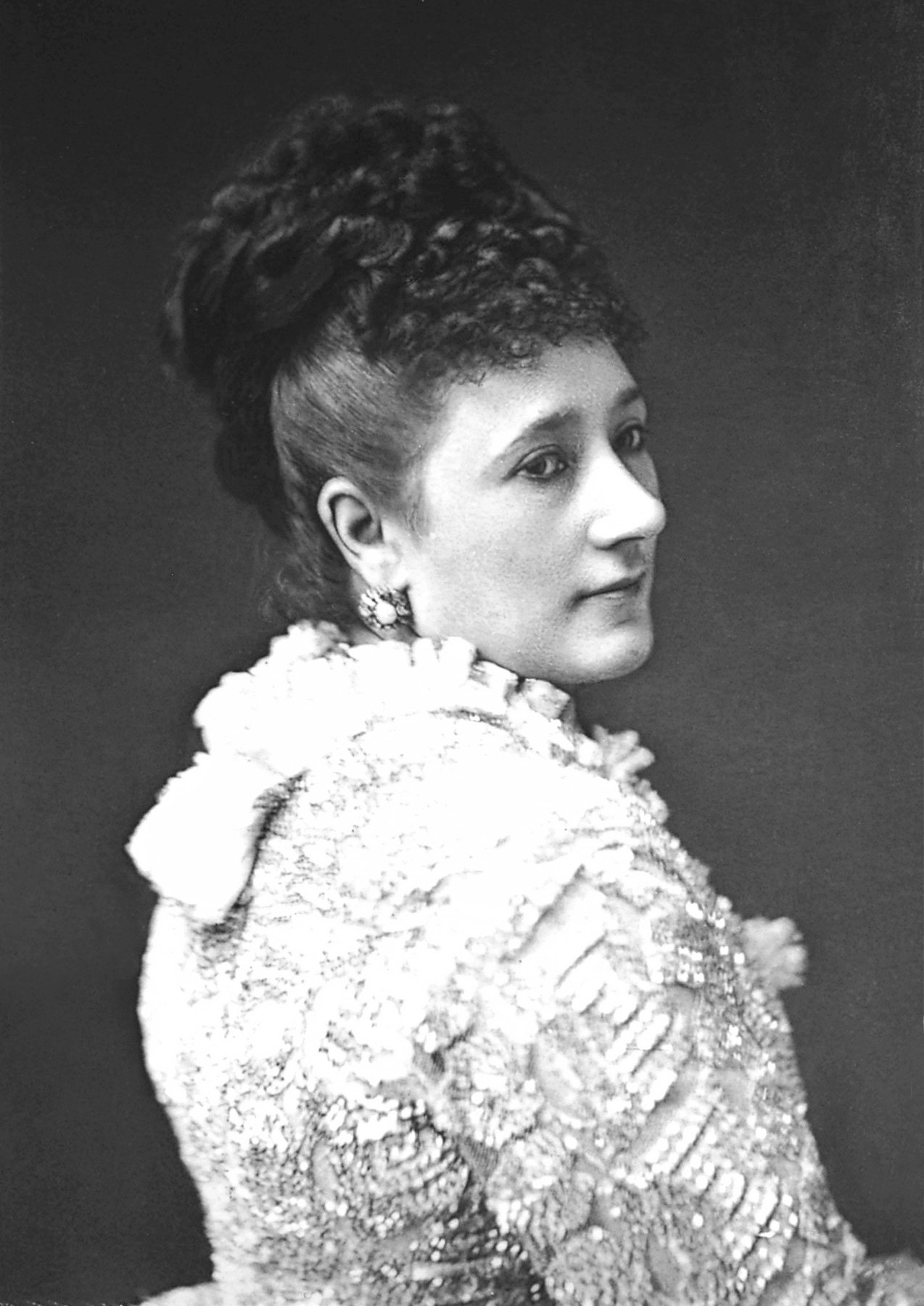
Matilda Charlotte Vining

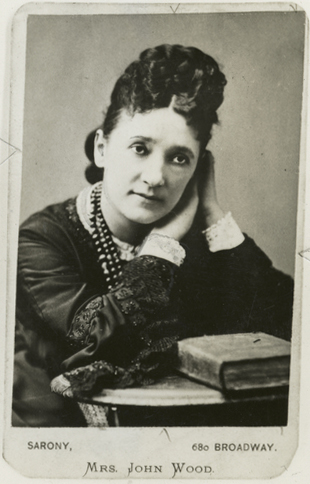
Mrs. John Wood

Matilda Charlotte Vining (6 November 1831 (baptised 28 November), Liverpool – 11 January 1915, Birchington-on-Sea), known professionally as Mrs. John Wood, was an English actress and theatre manager.

== Biography ==
Born into a theatrical family, Matilda Charlotte Vining travelled the country as a child actor. Over time, she developed a talent for comedy. An older cousin was Fanny Vining.

In 1854, Vining married John Wood, an English actor. The couple moved to Boston, Massachusetts, where they became involved in American theatre. Her first part in the United States was that of Gertrude in A Loan of a Lover on 11 September 1854. The Woods played Boston for three seasons, and for the first three months of their third, appeared at the Wallack's Theatre in New York City. New York was already the centre of American theatre, and Mrs. John Wood came to outshine her husband. T. Allston Brown, a contemporary historian of the theatre, offers this explanation for her fame:

Mrs. John Wood was a very pretty woman, possessing a fine figure and an attractive face. Her style was excellent in everything she attempted. She read well, had a melodious voice, was affecting in pathetic scenes and lively in those of a cheerful character, was a graceful dancer, and, although her voice was not very strong, it was melodious and well cultivated. She possessed the artistic talent which satisfied every demand that could be made by the most rigid stickler for a high degree of merit in a theatrical artist.

Mr. and Mrs. Wood again played Wallack's in the summer of 1857, then moved to San Francisco, California. There they played Maguire's Opera House on 18 January 1858. This season, Mrs. John Wood gained renown for her roles in Hi-a-wa-tha; or, Ardent Spirit and Laughing Waters and Love's Disguises. She may have managed two theatres during this period: Forrest Theatre in Sacramento for a few weeks in 1858 and the American Theatre in San Francisco from March 1859 to the beginning of summer.

In mid-1859, she parted ways with her husband, daughter, and mother and returned to New York. There she joined Dion Boucicault's troupe at the Winter Garden Theatre. She and Boucicault clashed, so Mrs. Wood decided to tour New York independently for three seasons. On 2 April 1861, ten days before the outbreak of the American Civil War, Mrs. John Wood performed "Dixie" for a concluding scene featuring a Zouave march in a production of the burlesque Po-ca-hon-tas in New Orleans. The song was well-received and encored seven times, contributing to the popularity of the song as a Civil War anthem for the Confederacy.

Mrs. Wood met Laura Keene in the summer of 1860 while playing at Keene's playhouse, which was renamed the Olympic Theatre in 1863. She managed Jane English's Theatre from its reopening on 8 October 1863. Soon after, she became manager of the Olympic, which changed its name to Mrs. John Wood's Olympic Theatre. She stayed there three seasons, during which she concentrated on burlesques and comedies. On 30 June 1866, she departed for England.

Mrs. Wood continued her management career at the St James's Theatre in London from 1869 until mid-1872. She then returned to the United States for the 1872–73 season, then returned to England. In 1881, she appeared in Foggerty's Fairy by W. S. Gilbert. Until her retirement in 1893, she managed a number of English theatres.

Mrs. Wood died in 1915 at the age of 83 in Birchington-on-Sea, Thanet, Kent, England.
