= Sophie Larkin =

English actress

Sophie Larkin (1833–1903) was an English actress of the late Victorian era. She created roles in plays by T. W. Robertson and in the long-running play Our Boys by H. J. Byron.

== Life ==
Larkin's London debut was in 1865 at the Prince of Wales's Theatre in Naval Engagements. At the same theatre she subsequently appeared in leading roles in the original productions of plays by T. W. Robertson: in November 1865 as Lady Ptarmigant in Society; in September 1866 as Lady Shendryn in Ours; and in April 1867 as the Marquise de Saint-Maur in Caste. Robertson in these plays wrote the parts to suit the resident actors and actresses.

In January 1868 at St James's Theatre she created the part of Mrs Erskine Meek in The Needful, a comedy by H. T. Craven, and in the following month appeared in a revival of Craven's The Chimney Corner at the same theatre. Later that year she joined the company of Fanny Josephs at the Holborn Theatre, and appeared there in April in The White Fawn by F. C. Burnand, and in 1869 in a revival of Craven's Miriam's Crime. In April 1870 she appeared at St James's Theatre in Frou-Frou, produced by Mademoiselle Beatrice. In October 1871 she appeared at the Globe Theatre in the original production of Partners for Life by H. J. Byron.

In 1874, 1879 and 1880 Larkin appeared in West End productions of Two Roses, by James Albery. From January 1875 Larkin was in the original production of H. J. Byron's Our Boys, at the Vaudeville Theatre, originating the role of Clarissa Champneys. The play ran for an unprecedented 1362 nights; she continued in the role throughout the run. The play was eventually replaced by Byron's The Girls, in which she created the part of Mrs Clench.

During the following years she appeared in 1884 at the Lyceum Theatre in a revival of Pygmalion and Galatea by W. S. Gilbert; and in 1894–1895 at the Adelphi Theatre in The Fatal Card by C. Haddon Chambers.

Larkin died in 1903. An obiturarist wrote that she was "longtime a popular old woman actress on the London stage. ... In her time she could adapt herself equally well to the antique comic or modern humorous style of character. No comedy was too old or too new for Sophie Larkin to seem natural and happy in her part."
