= John Hare (actor) =

British actor and theatre manager (1844–1921)

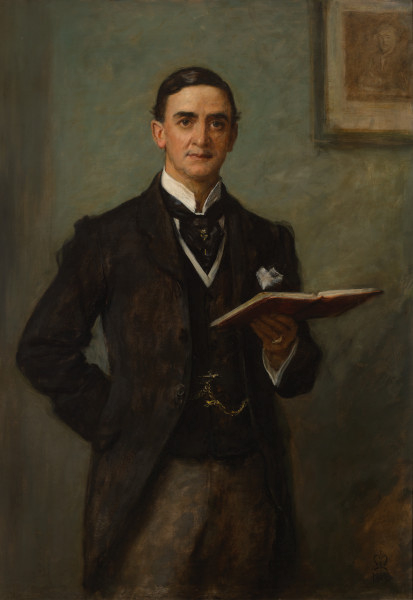
Portrait of John Hare by Millais, 1893

Sir John Hare (16 May 1844 – 28 December 1921), born John Joseph Fairs, was an English actor and theatre manager of the later 19th– and early 20th centuries.

Born and brought up in London, with frequent visits to the West End, Hare had a passion for the theatre from his childhood. After acting as an amateur as a young man he joined a professional company in Liverpool, before making his London debut in 1865 at the age of 21 with Marie Wilton's company. Wilton was a pioneer of naturalistic theatre, with which Hare was greatly in sympathy, and he quickly gained a reputation in character roles, particularly in comedies.

Within a decade Hare was well enough established to go into management. He was in partnership with the actor W. H. Kendal at the Court Theatre from 1875 to 1879, and from 1879 to 1888 at the St James's Theatre with Kendal and the latter's wife, Madge. They presented, mostly successfully, a succession of new British plays, adaptations of French works, and revivals. At the Garrick Theatre from 1888 to 1895 Hare had a solo managerial career, after which he concentrated on acting – in the US, on tour in the British provinces, and in the West End. Among the playwrights with whom Hare was closely associated were T. W. Robertson, W. S. Gilbert and Arthur Wing Pinero.

Hare was admired for his carefully observed characterisations, his comedic flair and his handsomely-mounted productions. He was knighted in 1907, and died in London in 1921 at the age of 77, four years after his last stage appearance.

== Life and career ==
=== Early years: 1844–1865 ===
Hare as a young man

Hare was born and raised in London, the son of Jane Postumous née Armstrong (1801–1858) and Thomas Fairs (1796–1848), a London architect. (Note: The Dictionary of National Biography (1927) and the Oxford Dictionary of National Biography (2004) incorrectly give Giggleswick in Yorkshire as his probable birthplace; his Who's Who entry, published during his lifetime, gives London as his birthplace, as does The Times obituary (1921).) As a teenager he used to play truant to go to West End theatres to see the stars of the day, such as Charles Kean, Frederick Robson, Charles Mathews and J. B. Buckstone. After his parents died Hare was sent by his uncle, his legal guardian, to Giggleswick School, and he was studying for the civil service examination when he was invited to take part in some amateur theatricals. Propelled at the last minute from a small role to the leading part he found his passion for the theatre rekindled. After playing in two further amateur productions – as Beauseant in a burlesque on The Lady of Lyons, and Box in Box and Cox – he determined to go on the stage. His tutor at Giggleswick recognised that Hare was not cut out for the civil service, and at his urging Hare's uncle agreed to let the young man pursue a stage career.

Returning to London, Hare studied under the prominent actor Leigh Murray. In September 1864 Murray arranged for Hare to join the company at the Prince of Wales Theatre, Liverpool. Hare's first professional appearance was as Smallpiece in John Oxenford's play, A Woman of Business. Among the company were J. L. Toole (a guest star), Squire Bancroft, Lionel Brough and William Blakeley, with all of whom Hare was quickly on friendly terms. After Toole the company had another visiting star, E. A. Sothern, who encouraged the young actor and insisted that he should be cast in a leading comic role in Watts Phillips's new comedy The Woman in Mauve, which Sothern premiered at the theatre in December 1864.

On 12 August 1865 Hare (still known by his original surname, Fairs) married his childhood sweetheart, Mary Adela Elizabeth Holmes (1845–1931), daughter of John Hare Holmes, whose middle name Hare borrowed for his stage name. The marriage lasted more than fifty years; the couple had one son, Gilbert, who became a successful actor and manager, (Note: John Gilbert Hare (1869–1951), named after his godfather, W. S. Gilbert, pursued a stage career between 1890 and 1904. Until he was established as an actor he did not use his father's surname, but was billed as "Gilbert Dangars". In 1904 he switched to medicine, as a pathologist, bacteriologist and university lecturer. He resumed his stage career in 1919.) and two daughters, one of whom, Effie, married Bancroft's son George. As a newly married man Hare seriously considered leaving the stage in favour of more secure employment in the civil service; nevertheless he wrote to the actress and manager Marie Wilton, seeking to join a new company that she was setting up at the old Prince of Wales's Theatre in London. He was accepted, and his theatrical career in the West End began.

=== The Prince of Wales's and The Court: 1865–1879 ===
Hare made his London debut in September 1865, playing Short, the landlord, in Naval Engagements, an old comedy by Charles Dance, given as a curtain raiser to H. J. Byron's extravaganza Lucia di Lammermoor. Two months later Hare came to wide public and critical attention for his performance in T. W. Robertson's comedy Society. The Times later commented:

[Hare] bounded into fame more quickly, perhaps, than any actor of our time. On the eventful evening of November 1, 1865 – momentous to the English stage no less than to Hare – Tom Robertson's Society was produced, with Hare cast for the small part of Lord Ptarmigant. All the reforms in English acting which the Prince of Wales's Theatre was to achieve could be seen in little in Hare's Lord Ptarmigant: the close attention to detail, the propriety and verisimilitude, the minute finish which the small size of the theatre and stage permitted and which brought the best of English acting for a time on to the same level as the French – Lord Ptarmigant had little to do but to go to sleep, but he did it so well that the small part was one of the hits of the production. The theatre writer J. P. Wearing comments, "Even though Ptarmigant was a small role, Hare's thorough attention to detail reformed the way in which old male characters were recreated on stage".

Hare as Sir Peter Teazle and Marie Wilton (Mrs Bancroft) as Lady Teazle, in The School for Scandal in 1874

For the next nine years Hare remained a member of the Prince of Wales's company, appearing in a succession of Robertson's comedies and in other plays produced at the theatre. Among his parts were Prince Perovsky (Ours, Robertson, 1866), Sam Gerridge (Caste, Robertson, 1867), Bruce Fanquehere (Play, Robertson, 1868), Beau Farintosh (School, Robertson, 1869), Dunscombe Dunscombe (M. P., Robertson, 1870), Sir John Vesey (Money, Edward Bulwer-Lytton, 1872), and Sir Patrick Lundie (adaptation of Man and Wife, Wilkie Collins, 1873). He also appeared in curtain raisers such as Box and Cox, in which, having played Box in his amateur days, he now played Cox. (Note: Hare's old role of Box was played by George Honey, and Mrs Bouncer was played by Mrs Leigh Murray, widow of Hare's mentor.) His last part at the Prince of Wales's was in 1874: Sir Peter Teazle in The School for Scandal to the Lady Teazle of Mrs Bancroft, with Bancroft and Charles Coghlan as the Surface brothers. He was praised for rescuing his role from the low comedy treatment it had long suffered, but some thought his portrayal erred in the opposite direction and was too serious.

During this time, in 1869, Hare founded The Lambs of London as a social club for actors; he was voted its first Shepherd (in London) and, "with much truth and humour, was labelled 'The Despot'". He left the Prince of Wales's company in October 1874, when he was unable to master a leading role written for him in Sweethearts by W. S. Gilbert. The author was a close friend and wished to make use both of Hare's naturally boyish appearance and of his talent for impersonating elderly men, contrasting the character in youth in the first act and old age in the second. In rehearsal, Hare struggled with playing the young romantic lead, and eventually, despite Gilbert's advice, he negotiated terms for leaving the company, and Coghlan took over his role. (Note: Coghlan received generally good notices, though one critic commented that he "could not fail to suggest to playgoers what a star the management has lost in Mr. Hare".)

For some time Hare had planned to go into theatre management, and he secured the Court Theatre with W. H. Kendal as his silent partner. Kendal's wife, Madge, played the title role in Hare's first production, Coghlan's Lady Flora, on 18 March 1875, with her husband and Hare in the other leading roles. The production and acting were well received, but though the play was praised by The Era, other papers thought little of it. Hare hoped to continue the tradition of Robertson by fostering new English comedies, but he found that original works by Coghlan and Gilbert were less successful than Coghlan's English version of a French play, A Quiet Rubber, which opened on 8 January 1876, giving Hare one of his greatest successes. In the same year he also did good business with A Scrap of Paper, Palgrave Simpson's adaptation of a French comedy, and a revival of an older English comedy, New Men and Old Acres.

As a manager Hare was known for his insistence on having plays attractively staged, well cast and performed exactly as he wanted. Occasionally he could be, in Wearing's phrase, "strict and peppery, and even sarcastic" at rehearsals, and Madge Kendal recounted a comically ferocious battle of wills between Hare and the equally intransigent Gilbert at a rehearsal of the latter's Broken Hearts in 1875. (Note: Broken Hearts (1875), a sentimental "fairy play", was Gilbert's only work written for Hare's management, although the two were close, if occasionally quarrelsome, friends. It had a moderate run of 78 performances.) Hare did not appear in all his own productions; he was not in the cast of Broken Hearts, although one part was evidently written with him in mind; in one of the greatest successes of his management, Olivia (1878), W. G. Wills's adaptation of The Vicar of Wakefield, he chose not to play the vicar but cast William Terris to co-star with Ellen Terry. His management of the Court ended when his lease expired in 1879. His last presentation there was on 19 July of that year with Robertson's The Ladies' Battle, an adaptation of a French play.

=== St James's Theatre: 1879–1888 ===
Since its inception in 1835 the St James's, in an unfashionable part of the West End, had acquired a reputation as an unlucky theatre, and more money had been lost than made by successive managements. (Note: The theatre had attracted this label as early as 1839: "this very beautiful but most unlucky theatre", and it continued throughout most of the 19th century: "an establishment long reputed the most unfortunate in London (1859); "this seemingly ill-fated place of amusement" (1875); "an unlucky one; its capacity was so small that [it did not pay] even with full houses" (1888); and even after the Hare and Kendal years and into George Alexander's highly successful tenure between 1891 and 1918 the label was still familiar.) At the invitation of Lord Newry, the owner of the freehold of the theatre, Hare and the Kendals jointly took over the management of the house in 1879. For the first time, the theatre's reputation was steadily defied. The new lessees aimed both to amuse and to improve public taste, and in Wearing's view they achieved their aim. Under their management the St James's staged twenty-one plays: seven were new British pieces, eight adaptations of French plays, and the rest were revivals.

Hare aged 35 in one of his many elderly parts, with W. H. Kendal in The Queen's Shilling at the St James's Theatre, 1879

Their first production, on 4 October 1879, was a revival of The Queen's Shilling, one of their Court successes, an adaptation of an old French comedy by Jean-François Bayard. Madge Kendal had the star part, but her husband's dashing army officer was also well liked, and The Morning Post praised Hare's "masterly" performance as the old colonel, giving "extraordinary zest and brilliancy" and "bring[ing] down the house in shouts of laughter and applause". The partnership had another early success at the beginning of 1880 with a revival of Tom Taylor's popular play, Still Waters Run Deep. The Kendals took the main roles but the laurels went to Hare in the comparatively small part of Potter, a performance described by the writer T. Edgar Pemberton as "a masterpiece of character-acting, faultless in get-up and, indeed, in all respects. … [A] keen instance of unexaggerated eccentricity".

Wearing regards The Money Spinner (1881) as of particular importance to this period of the theatre's history, being the first of several of A. W. Pinero's plays staged there by Hare and the Kendals. It was regarded as daringly unconventional and a risky venture, but it caught on with the public, partly for Hare's character, the "disreputable but delightful old reprobate and card-shark" Baron Croodle. Other plays by Pinero given by the Hare-Kendal management at the St James's were The Squire (1881), The Ironmaster (1884), Mayfair (1885) and The Hobby Horse (1886). B. C. Stephenson's comedy Impulse (1883) was a substantial success and was revived by public demand two months after the end of its first run. There was a mixed reception of a rare excursion into Shakespeare, As You Like It (1885): Madge Kendal's Rosalind was much liked, Kendal's Orlando had a lukewarm reception, and Hare's Touchstone was considered by some to be the worst ever seen. Among the company in these years the actresses included Fanny Brough, Helen Maud Holt and the young May Whitty; among their male colleagues were George Alexander, Allan Aynesworth, Albert Chevalier, Henry Kemble, William Terris, Brandon Thomas and Lewis Waller. Hare and the Kendals concluded their management partnership in 1888 with a farewell season of revivals of their greatest successes.

=== 1889–1899 ===
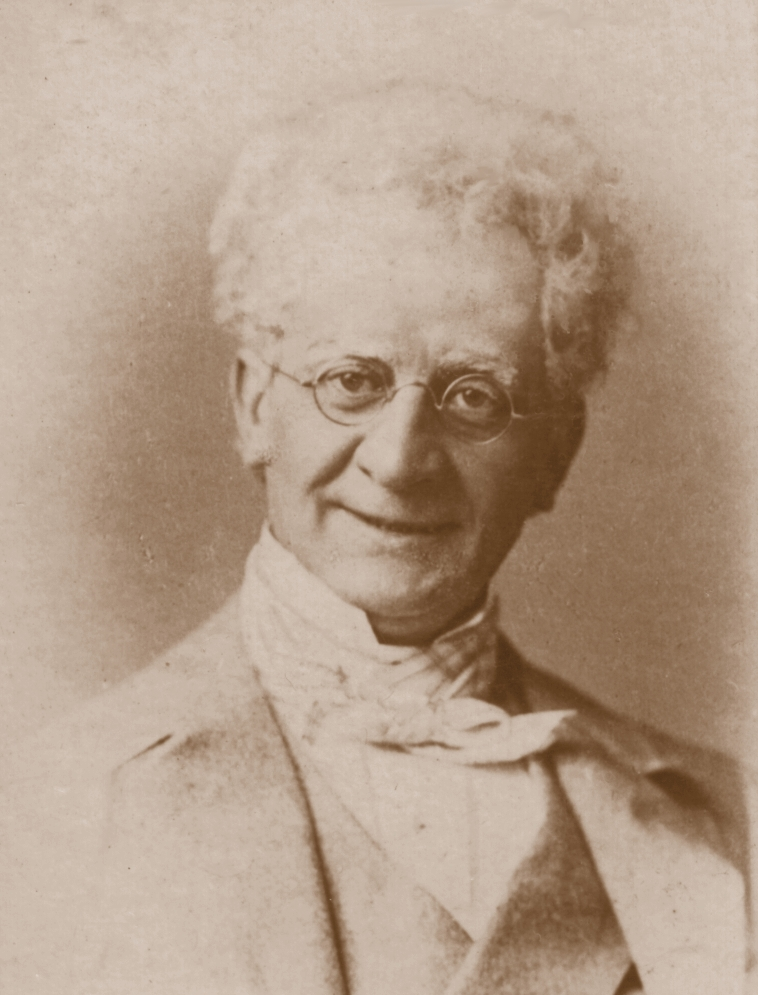
As Benjamin Goldfinch in Grundy's A Pair of Spectacles (1890)

In 1889 Hare resumed a managerial career, taking charge of the new Garrick Theatre, built for and owned by W. S. Gilbert. The cost of building the theatre had been unexpectedly high, with the result that Hare had to pay a substantial annual rent of about £4,000 for his tenancy. He opened on 24 April 1889 with Pinero's The Profligate, in which he played the part of Lord Dangars. The play received mixed reviews but ran for seven months. Two other Pinero plays followed during Hare's tenure: Lady Bountiful (1891), and The Notorious Mrs Ebbsmith (1895), with Mrs Patrick Campbell in the latter. Two other notable productions at the Garrick were Grundy's A Pair of Spectacles (1890), which became Hare's greatest popular success, and a revival of Diplomacy, with a cast that included the Bancrofts, Johnston Forbes-Robertson, Arthur Cecil and Hare's son Gilbert, as well as Hare himself. Less successful productions included an English version of Sardou's melodrama La Tosca (1889) and Grundy's comedy An Old Jew (1894), both of which were taken off after short runs. Hare concluded his career as a manager on 15 June 1895 with a double bill of A Pair of Spectacles' and A Quiet Rubber.

Hare made his American debut in January 1896, appearing at Abbey's Theatre, New York, with a company including Julia Neilson, Charles Groves and Fred Terry, in The Notorious Mrs Ebbsmith, A Pair of Spectacles, A Quiet Rubber, and Gilbert's Comedy and Tragedy. (Note: The Notorious Mrs Ebbsmith, "smart, ingenious but disliked", according to The New York Times, was quickly taken off, but the other plays were popular and critical successes. After New York, Hare's company played in Washington DC, Boston and Brooklyn before returning to Britain in May.) The Times reported his American visit as "immensely successful ... contrary to some expectations, his very quiet, delicate art found many admirers". He returned to the US in 1897 and 1900–1901 and became almost as well known there as in Britain. (Note: Among the plays Hare took to the US on these visits were Robertson's Caste and School, Pinero's The Hobby Horse and plays by Grundy and Stuart Ogilvie.)

In the West End in 1899 Hare had one of his greatest box-office and critical successes in the title role of Pinero's The Gay Lord Quex. The play divided opinion among the reviewers, although more were in favour than not, but the notices for Hare were uniformly enthusiastic. The Pall Mall Gazette said: "Mr John Hare has done few things better: dignified, courteous, urbane, he suggests with infinite tact the presence of a jeunesse orageuse." The Morning Post commented that Hare had "added one more to a long series of triumphs". The Era called his Lord Quex "a masterpiece of comic acting" and said that no other actor in England could have played the part as he did.

=== 20th century ===
Hare's last role in a new play was Lord Carlton in J. M. Barrie's Little Mary (1903). Reviewing the production in The Saturday Review, Max Beerbohm wrote of Hare's performance, "One watches him with the same pleasure one has in sipping a glass of very good dry sherry". Not for the first time, Hare received better notices than the play, but he thought well enough of it to take it on tour in 1904, with Hilda Trevelyan replacing Nina Boucicault in the title role.

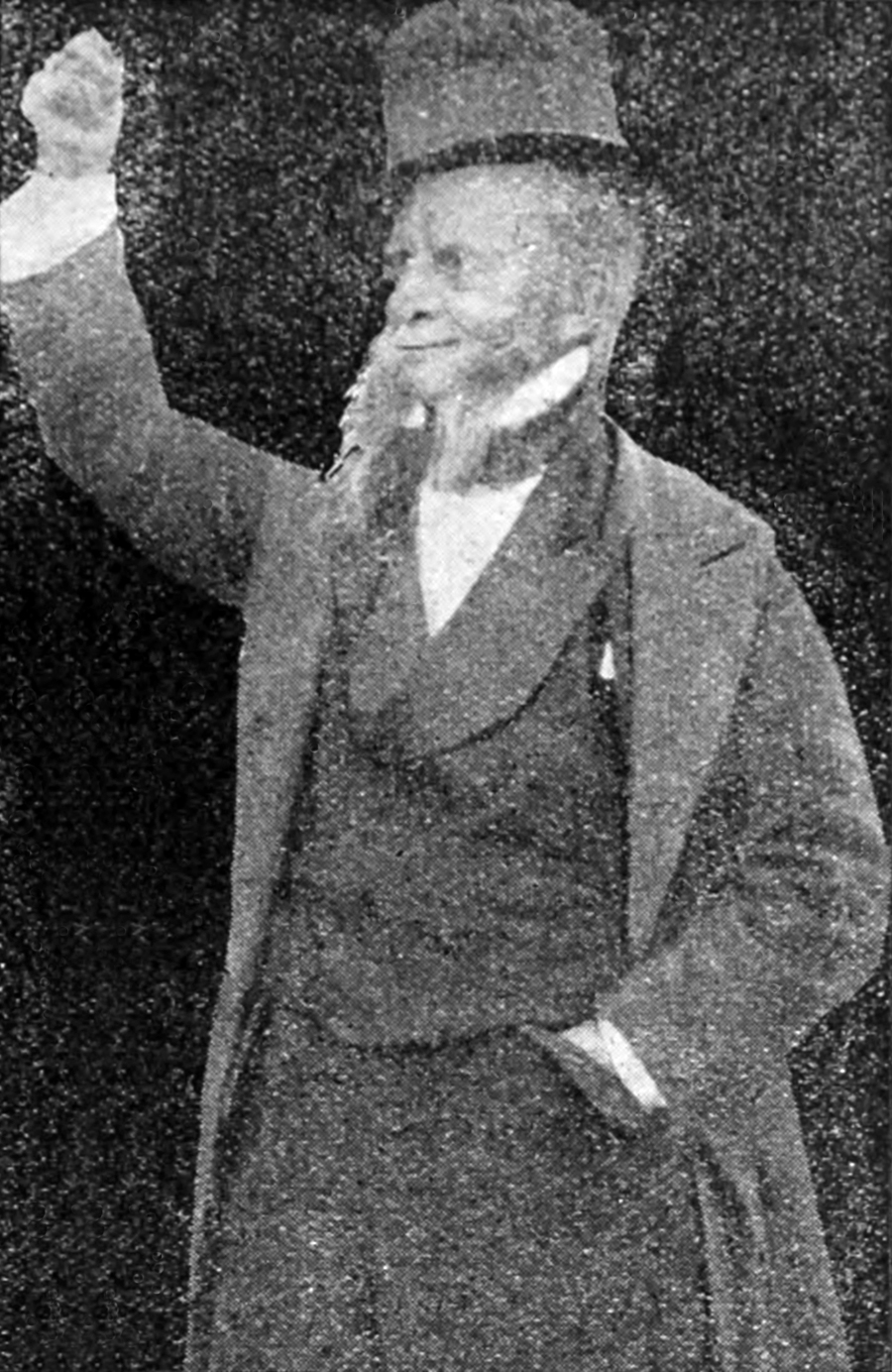
Hare in the 1915 film of Caste

For the rest of his career Hare revived old successes, touring in America and in the provinces, and appearing in various West End theatres for occasional short seasons. In 1907 he began what was billed as a farewell British tour; he also appeared in that year in royal command performances for Edward VII, in A Quiet Rubber at Sandringham and A Pair of Spectacles at Windsor Castle. At the Sandringham presentation he was knighted. In 1908 he gave what were billed as farewell performances of The Gay Lord Quex and A Pair of Spectacles at the Garrick. He said at the time that he would return only if someone were to offer him a new play so good as to be irresistible.

Hare appeared in three films: Caste (1915), The Vicar of Wakefield and A Pair of Spectacles (both 1916). His last appearances on stage were in July 1917, when he revived A Pair of Spectacles, making a large sum for wartime charities, and in September of that year when he appeared in the same play at Wyndham's Theatre. The Observer commented on the enjoyment given by "a still beautiful, amusing, touching performance; a performance which offers the not too common experience of an actor enjoying his part, playing it beautifully because he believes in it, and making us, too, believe in it and enjoy it".

In December 1921 Hare fell ill with influenza and then pneumonia. He died on 28 December 1921 at his home in Queen's Gate, London, aged 77. After a funeral service at St Margaret's, Westminster, he was buried in Hampstead Cemetery on 31 December.

== Reputation ==
A few years after Hare's death, a biographer wrote that his art "was in the modern English tradition, which he helped to a considerable extent to mould and to develop". His naturalistic style avoided the formality of the older English stage and suggested character by "tricks of deportment and facial expression that complete or illuminate the phrases of the author". The same writer commented that behind Hare's art was "a personality of rare modesty and charm, that instinctively avoided exaggeration and had a genuine dislike of publicity". In The Times's view, Hare was greatly loved for his personal charm both onstage and off ("in spite of a somewhat peppery temper") and for his precise observation:

[He] was a master of the art of impersonation. His every movement and look was eloquent, and not Coquelin aîné himself could tell you more about a character from the way he stood or coughed or held his hands than could Hare. Such perfection of finish has not been equalled on the stage of our times.

Wearing writes, "The roles he tackled were memorable because of his mastery of impersonation, and he was particularly adept at expressing gentle emotions with perfect simplicity. He strived for natural deportment and facial expression, and never degenerated into caricature." Wearing adds that as a manager Hare encouraged English dramatists and actors "and generally improved the stage". The Daily Telegraph said:

It may be doubted if the stage of any period has been able to boast a comedian so delicate in touch, so admirably finished in detail, or so consummate in artistic appreciation as John Hare.

== Notes, references and sources ==
=== Sources ===
- Ainger, Michael (2002). Gilbert and Sullivan – A Dual Biography. Oxford: Oxford University Press. ISBN 978-0-19-514769-8.
- Duncan, Barry (1964). St James's Theatre, Its Strange and Complete History, 1835–1857. London: Barrie and Rockliff. OCLC 979694996.
- Hardee, Jr., Lewis J. (2010) [2006]. The Lambs Theatre Club (softcover) (2nd ed.). Jefferson, North Carolina: McFarland Publishing. ISBN 978-0-7864-6095-3.
- Kendal, Madge (1933). Rudolph De Cordova (ed.). Dame Madge Kendal by Herself. London: John Murray. OCLC 2325826.
- Morley, Sheridan (1986). The Great Stage Stars. London: Angus & Robertson. ISBN 978-0-8160-1401-9.
- Parker, John, ed. (1922). Who's Who in the Theatre (fourth ed.). London: Sir Isaac Pitman and Sons. OCLC 473894893.
- Pemberton, T. Edgar (1895). John Hare, Comedian, 1865–1895. London and New York: Routledge. OCLC 297335709.
- Stedman, Jane (1996). W. S. Gilbert, A Classic Victorian and His Theatre. Oxford: Oxford University Press. ISBN 978-0-19-816174-5.
