= Effie Bancroft =

English actress and theatre manager

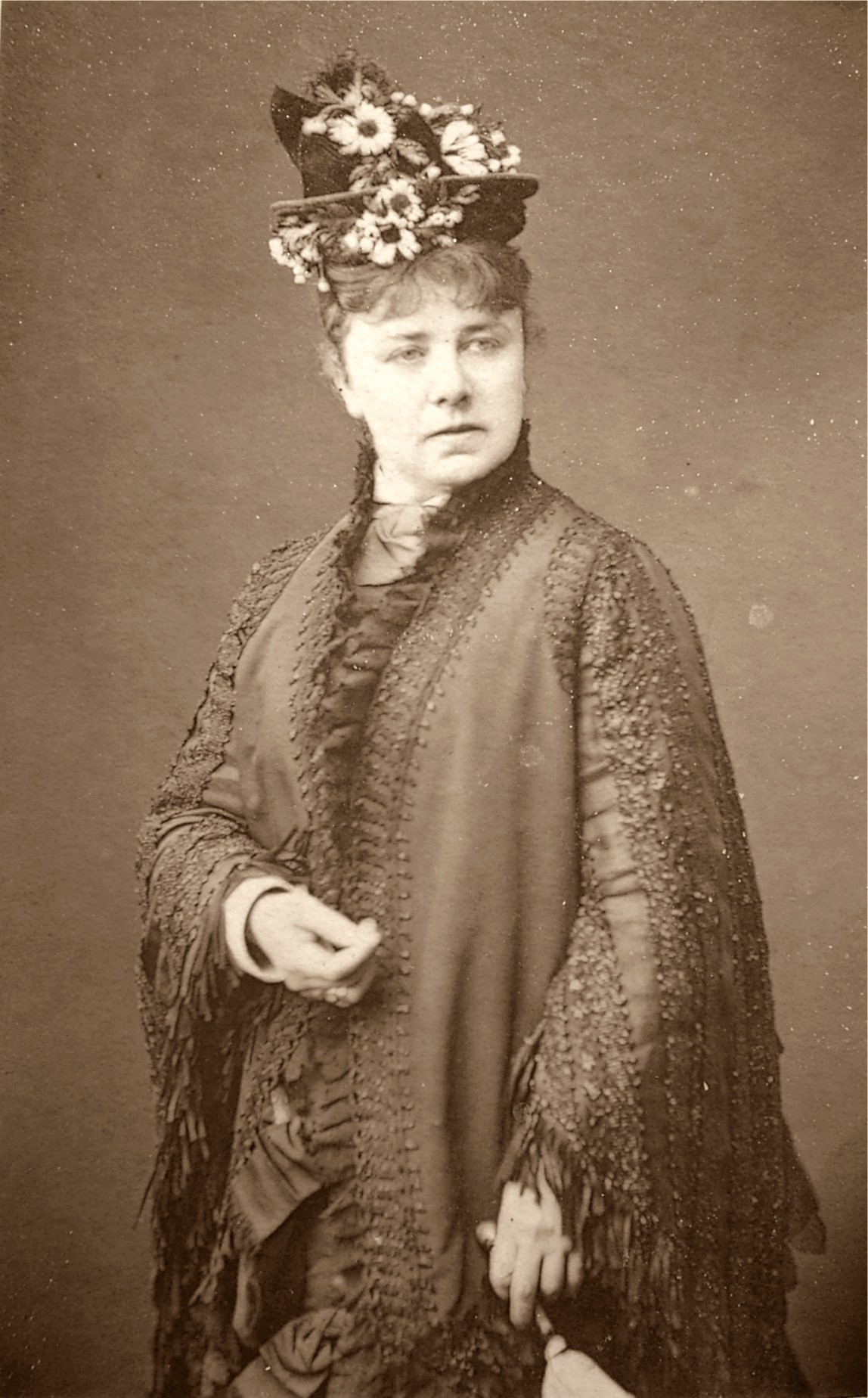
Marie Wilton (later Effie Bancroft)

Marie Effie Wilton, Lady Bancroft (1836–1921) was an English actress and theatre manager. She appeared onstage as Marie Wilton until after her marriage in December 1867 to Squire Bancroft, when she adopted his last name. Bancroft and her husband were important in the development of Victorian era theatre through their presentation of innovative plays at the London theatres that they managed, first the Prince of Wales's Theatre and later the Haymarket Theatre.

== Life and career ==
Bancroft was born at Doncaster, and as a child appeared on the stage with her parents, who were both actors. Although her birth date is usually given as 1839, in fact she was born in 1836; she appeared as a 6-year-old at the Norwich Theatre on 14 May 1842, reciting a 120-line poem from memory. (In her autobiography Bancroft characteristically took a year off her age, claiming "At the age of five I recited Collins's Ode to the Passions".) Among her early parts was that of Fleance in Macbeth (1846). She made her London début on 15 September 1856, at the Lyceum Theatre, as the boy Henri in Belphegor, playing the same night in Perdita; or, the Royal Milkmaid.

She won great popularity in several boy roles, in burlesques at various theatres, as Cupid in two different plays, and notably as Pippo, in The Maid and the Magpie, by H. J. Byron, at the Royal Strand Theatre (1858). For several years she remained at the Strand, taking numerous parts of the same general type. A benefit performance was given for her in 1859.

=== Prince of Wales's Theatre (1865–80) ===
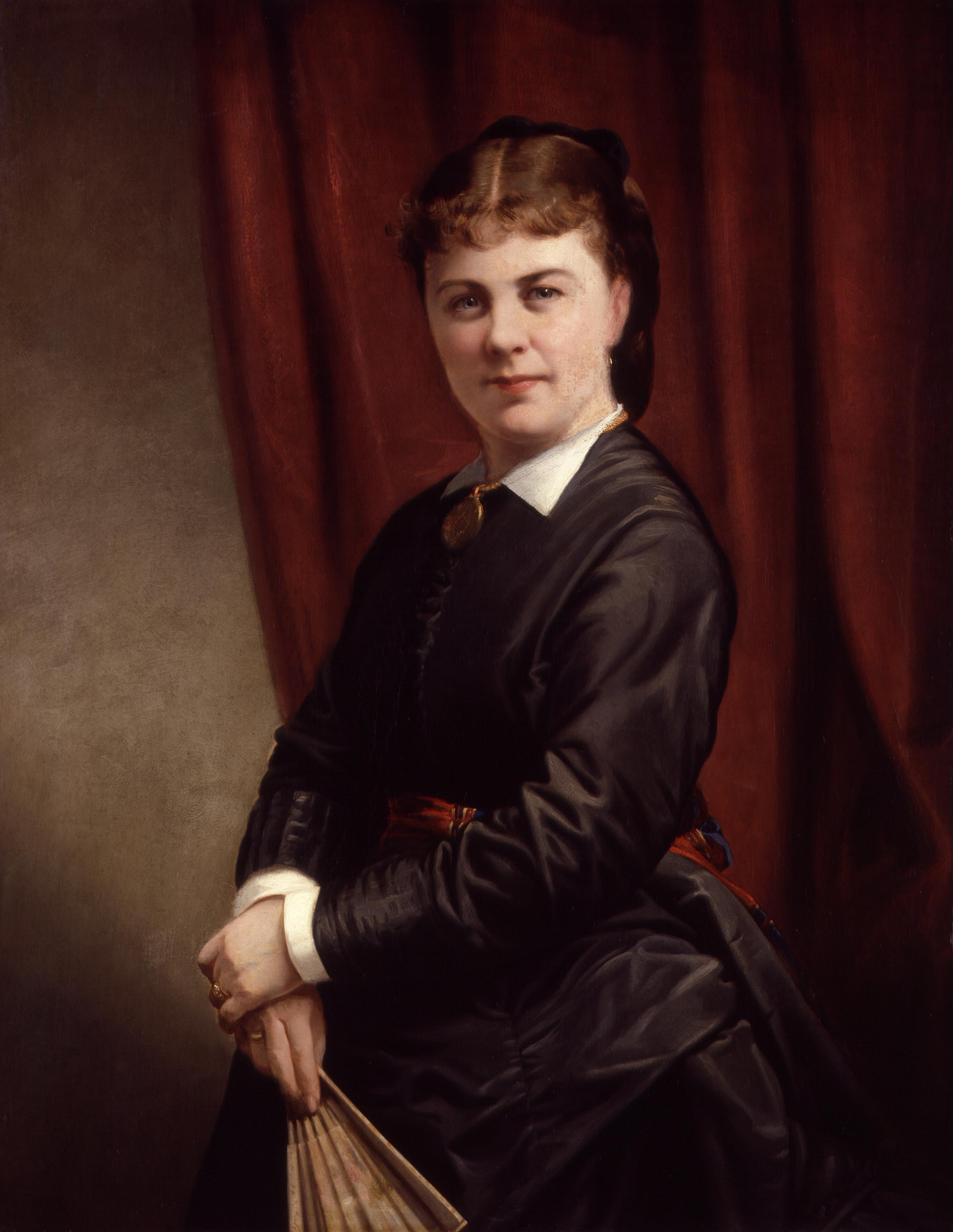
Portrait of Bancroft by Thomas Barker, c. 1870s

In April 1865, she began, in partnership with Henry Byron, the management of the Prince of Wales's Theatre.

For two seasons before her marriage she managed the theatre alone. She secured as a leading actor Squire Bancroft, whom she had met shortly before in Liverpool and married in December 1867. Her son Charles Edward Wilton (born 1863) changed his name to Bancroft upon the marriage of his mother to Squire Bancroft. Their sons together were George Louise Pleydell Bancroft (born 1869) and Arthur Hamilton Bancroft (born and died 1870).

The Prince of Wales's soon became noted for its series of successful comedies by T. W. Robertson, namely: Society (1865), Ours (1866), Caste (1867), Play (1868), School (1869) and M. P. (1870).

Bancroft regularly took the principal female parts in these pieces, her husband playing the leading man. Together, Robertson and the Bancrofts are considered to have instigated a new form of drama known as 'drawing-room comedy' or 'cup and saucer drama', in which actors perform natural behaviours onstage, such as drinking tea or reading books.

The Bancrofts gave Robertson an unprecedented amount of directorial control over the plays, which was a key step to institutionalizing the power that directors wield in the theatre today.

The Bancrofts were also responsible for making fashionable the 'box set', which Lucia Elizabeth Vestris had first used at the Olympic Theatre in the 1830s – this consisted of rooms on stage which were dressed with sofas, curtains, chairs, and carpets on the stage floor. They also provided their actors with salaries and wardrobes. Also, the Bancrofts redesigned their theatre to suit the increasingly upscale audience: "The cheap benches near the stage, where the rowdiest elements of the audience used to sit were replaced by comfortable padded seats, carpets were laid in the aisles, and the pit was renamed the stalls."

Other plays that the Bancrofts produced at the Prince of Wales's Theatre were Tame Cats (1868), The School for Scandal (1874), W. S. Gilbert's Sweethearts (1874), The Vicarage (1877), and Diplomacy (1878, an adaptation of Victorien Sardou's Dora). Mr. and Mrs. Bancroft likewise presented at their theatre a number of prominent actors, among them Hare, Coghlan, the Kendals, and Ellen Terry. In 1879, she reprised a favourite role of hers, Nan, in John Baldwin Buckstone's Good for Nothing, in a mixed bill alongside a revival of Sweethearts, in which she played Jenny Northcott.

=== Later years ===
As Nan, in Good for Nothing (1879)

In 1879, the Bancrofts moved to the Haymarket Theatre, a larger house, where they renovated the theatre and reportedly introduced the first use of the electric light on the English stage in 1880. They continued the successful presentation of modern comedy until both retired from management on 20 July 1885, having made a considerable fortune producing theatre.

After that, Lady Bancroft rarely appeared onstage. In 1895, her eldest son, Captain Charles Bancroft married Margaret Grimston, a daughter of Dame Madge Kendal and William Hunter Kendal. The marriage was later annulled.

== Books ==
Bancroft was the author of the novel The Shadow of Neeme. She also collaborated with her husband in the production of two volumes of reminiscences called Mr and Mrs. Bancroft On and Off the Stage, Written by Themselves (London, 1888) and The Bancrofts: Recollections of Sixty Years (Dutton and Co.: London, 1909).

== Recordings ==
Bancroft recorded three 10" discs for the Gramophone Company in June 1903.

- 1236 Drinking the waters.
- 1237 The Deutscher's baby.
- 1238 (a) A boy's philosophy; (b) Love.

== Sources ==
- The Bancrofts: Recollections of Sixty Years (Dutton and Co.: London, 1909)
- William Baker; Judith L Fisher; Andrew Gasson; Andrew Maunder (2007). Lives of Victorian Literary Figures, Part V. Pickering & Chatto. ISBN 978-1-85196-819-0. (Online summary here.)
- Stedman, Jane W. (1996). W. S. Gilbert, A Classic Victorian & His Theatre. Oxford University Press. ISBN 978-0-19-816174-5.
