= Edmund Distin Maddick =

Edmund Distin Maddick (1857–1939) was an English surgeon and pioneer of cinema.

Born in Clerkenwell on 11 April 1857 and studying medicine at St Thomas' Hospital, Maddick became a doctor and later a surgeon in the Royal Navy. Although it is claimed he achieved the rank of Admiral (Surgeon) of the Fleet, having resigned after 11 months as a naval surgeon he in fact became an Honorary Surgeon to the London Brigade of Royal Naval Artillery Volunteers. He was also a surgeon to the Italian Hospital in London and was a Knight to the Crown of Italy. He married Violet Emily Caroline Byng, and their son Major Edmund Cecil Strafford Byng Maddick served in the First World War in the Royal Artillery.

Abandoning medicine in his 40s, he took over and rebuilt the Scala Theatre in 1905 and when it failed as a theatre, fitted it out in 1911 for a Kinematograph. During the Great War, it is claimed that he was the Intelligence Department's Director of Kinematography. In fact Sir William F. Jury held the post. Maddick did indeed work for MI7 and liaised with the French Intelligence Bureau, promoted captain for this task. Maddick claimed to have ‘produced all the films up to and including the Battle of the Somme’, and to have been ‘on land and at sea under enemy fire; as well as in aeroplanes and airships’. Probably the most notable production was the film The Battle of the Somme, released just a month after the first battle started in July 1916. He was then 'loaned' to the Admiralty advising on film matters, and in 1918 was made an Equipment Officer in the RAF, producing training films. The Scala was used for showing films for censorship, and after the War he used the cinema to teach human anatomy.

He was well-connected and well known in British and Italian Royal circles. The Tory Government offered him a baronetcy in 1925, but the General Election intervened and Ramsay MacDonald's Labour Party reduced this offer to a knighthood. Insulted, Maddick turned this down and eventually accepted a CBE in 1927.

He constructed an unusual mausoleum at West Norwood Cemetery approximately ten years before he died. The building is nearly 40 ft high in white Portland stone surmounted by a marble figure of Christ and a child. He directed that the pin given him by King George V should be on his breast and that his jewellery be placed in a box given him by the Japanese Imperial household and buried with him.
