= Squire Bancroft =

English actor-manager (1841–1926)

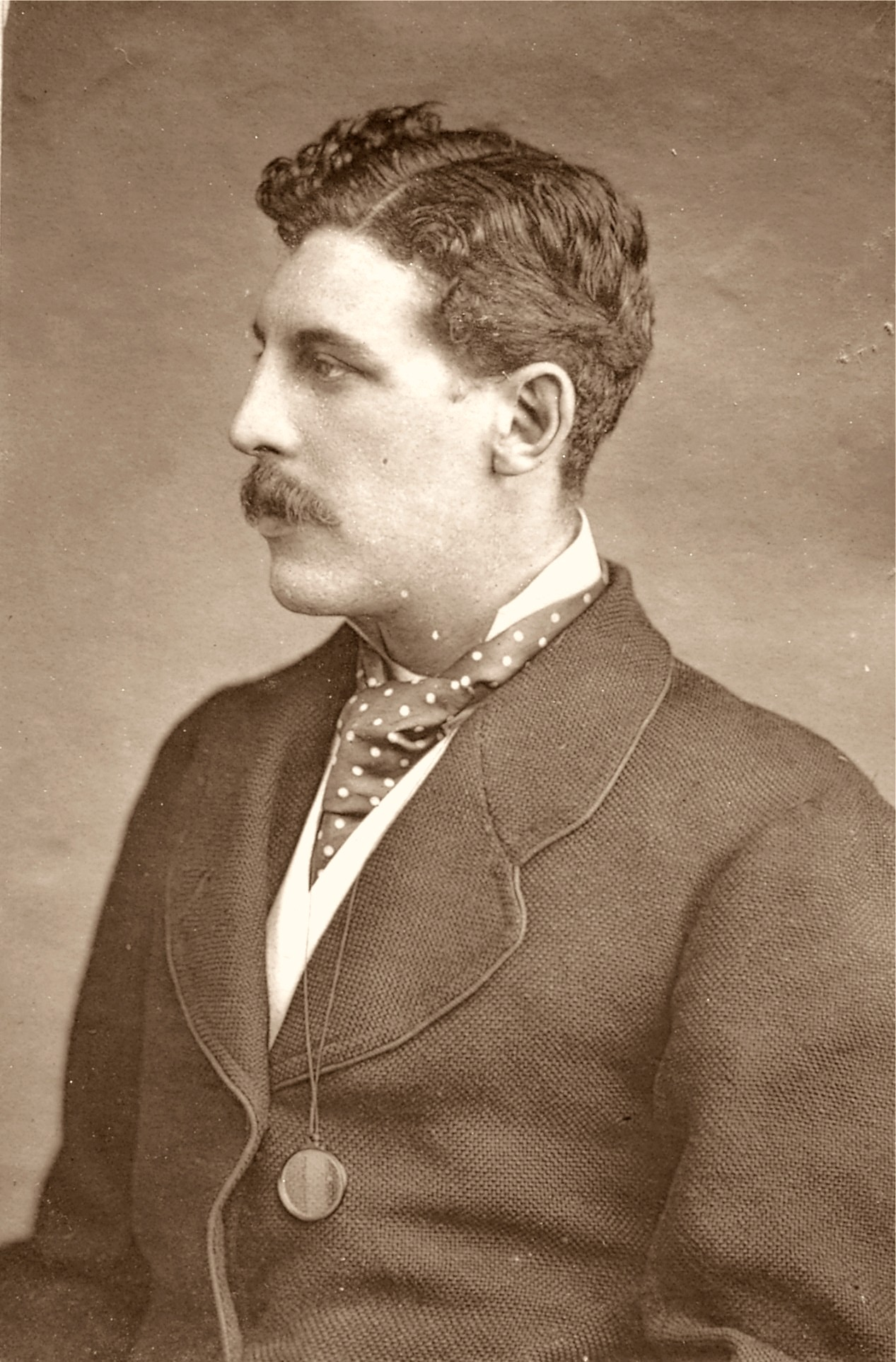
Squire Bancroft (1841–1926)

Sir Squire Bancroft (14 May 1841 – 19 April 1926), born Squire White Butterfield, was an English actor-manager. He changed his name to Squire Bancroft Bancroft by deed poll just before his marriage. He and his wife Effie Bancroft are considered to have instigated a new form of drama known as 'drawing-room comedy' or 'cup and saucer drama', owing to the realism of their stage sets.

== Early life and career ==
Bancroft was born in Rotherhithe, London. His first appearance on the stage was in 1861 at Birmingham, and he played in the provinces with success for several years. His first London appearance was in 1865 as Jack Crawley in J. P. Wooler's A Winning Hazard at the Prince of Wales's Theatre off Tottenham Court Road. He was then using the stage name Sydney Bancroft; also in the cast was his future wife, Effie Wilton. This theatre was managed by Henry Byron and Wilton, whom Bancroft married in December 1867. After their marriage the Bancrofts became joint managers of the theatre.

Mr and Mrs Bancroft produced and starred in all the Thomas William Robertson comedies beginning in 1865: Society (1865), Ours (1866), Caste (1867), Play (1868), School (1869) and M.P. (1870), and, after Robertson's death, in revivals of the old comedies, for which they surrounded themselves with an admired company. Together, Robertson and the Bancrofts are considered to have instigated a new form of drama known as "drawing-room comedy" or "cup and saucer drama". The Bancrofts gave Robertson an unprecedented amount of directorial control over his plays, which was a key step to institutionalizing the power that directors wield in the theatre today.

The Bancroft management at the Prince of Wales's Theatre constituted a new era in the development of the English stage and had the effect of reviving the London interest in modern drama. They were also responsible for making fashionable the "box set", which Lucia Elizabeth Vestris had first used at the Olympic Theatre in the 1830s – this consisted of rooms on stage which were dressed with sofas, curtains, chairs, and carpets on the stage floor. They also provided their actors with salaries and wardrobes. Also, the Bancrofts redesigned their theatre to suit the increasingly upscale audience: "The cheap benches near the stage, where the rowdiest elements of the audience used to sit were replaced by comfortable padded seats, carpets were laid in the aisles, and the pit was renamed the stalls."

Other plays they premiered or produced there were W. S. Gilbert's Allow Me To Explain (1867) and his romantic comedy tribute to Robertson, Sweethearts (1874), as well as Tame Cats (1868), Lytton's Money (1872), The School for Scandal (1874), Boucicault's London Assurance (1877), and Diplomacy (1878), an adaptation of Sardou's Dora by Clement Scott and B. C. Stephenson.

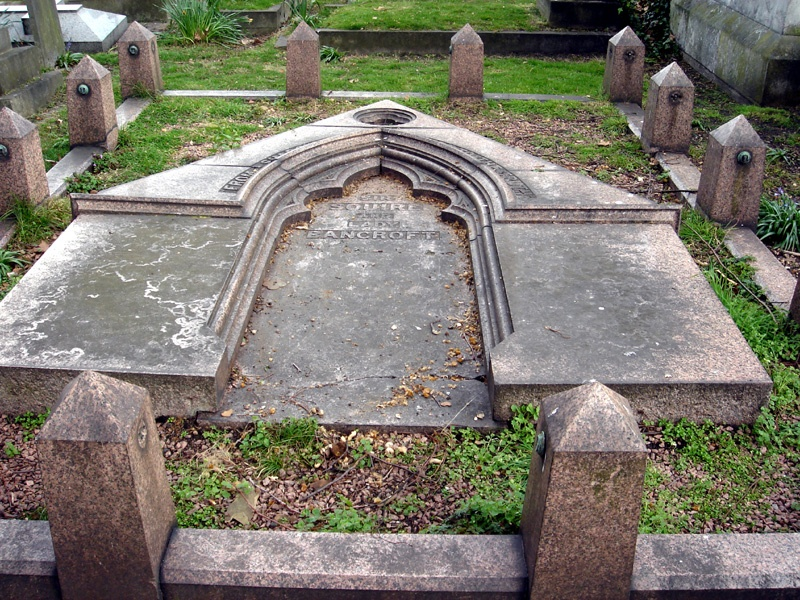
Funerary monument, Brompton Cemetery, London

== Later life and career ==
In the 1870s and 1880s, in addition to his management responsibilities, Bancroft continued to play leading roles in numerous contemporary plays, as well as in works by Shakespeare and Richard Brinsley Sheridan's and other classic plays, often opposite his wife. In 1879, the Bancrofts moved to the Haymarket Theatre, where they produced or starred in a revival of Money, and in Sardou's Odette (for which they engaged Madame Helena Modjeska), Fedora, and Pinero's Lords and Commons, with revivals of previous successes.

Having made a considerable fortune, they retired from management in 1885, but Bancroft continued to act until 1918. Bancroft was knighted in 1897. Between 1917, and his death in 1926, Bancroft maintained rooms at the fashionable Albany, in Piccadilly. He and his wife are buried in Brompton Cemetery; a flat, arch-shaped memorial marks the graves, but their mausoleum was destroyed by bombing in World War II.

== Publications ==
Bancroft wrote two books, and in collaboration with his wife, he wrote two volumes of reminiscences called Mr. and Mrs. Bancroft On and Off the Stage, Written by Themselves (London, 1888) and The Bancrofts: Recollections of Sixty Years (London: Dutton and Co., 1909).

== Sources ==
- The Bancrofts: Recollections of Sixty Years (Dutton and Co.: London, 1909)
- Stedman, Jane W. (1996). W. S. Gilbert, A Classic Victorian & His Theatre. Oxford University Press. ISBN 978-0-19-816174-5.
