= Our Boys =

Comedy by Henry James Byron

Scene from Our Boys

Cover of script, c. 1880

Our Boys is a comedy in three acts written by Henry James Byron, first performed in London on 16 January 1875 at the Vaudeville Theatre. Until it was surpassed by the run of Charley's Aunt in the 1890s, it was the world's longest-running play, up to that time, with 1,362 performances until April 1879. Theatre owner David James (1839–93) was Perkyn in the production. The production also toured extensively. The play contains the famous line, "Life’s too short for chess."

The piece played in New York in 1875, at the New Fifth Avenue Theatre, and in 1907 at the Lyric Theatre. It also played in Philadelphia. Arthur Williams appeared in a 1914 London revival of the piece.

== Roles ==
- Sir Geoffrey Champneys (a county magnate) – William Farren Jr.
- Talbot Champneys (his son, a washed-out youth) – Thomas Thorne
- Perkyn Middlewick (a retired butterman) – David James
- Charles Middlewick (his aristocratic-looking son) – Charles Warner
- Poddles (Middlewick's butler) – W. Lestocq
- Kempster (Sir Geoffrey's servant) – Mr. Howard
- Violet Melrose (an heiress) – Kate Bishop
- Mary Melrose (her poor cousin) – Amy Roselle
- Clarissa Champneys (Sir Geoffrey's sister, an elderly spinster) – Sophie Larkin
- Belinda (a lodging-house slave) – Cicely Richards

== Synopsis ==
Sir Geoffrey Champneys is very proud of his son, Talbot, an uninspired and weak youth. Mr. Middlewick, a retired butterman, also thinks highly of his son, Charles, an enthusiastic and lively young fellow. They are delighted to welcome their 'boys' home after a three-years' sojourn on the Continent. The Baronet – proud and poor – has determined that his son should marry Violet Melrose, an heiress; but that young lady and Charles Middlewick have already met at Vienna and decided differently (although she was, at first, unhappy with his lowly station). Meanwhile, Talbot is in love with her poor cousin, the free-and-easy Mary. Old Middlewick has taken a great dislike to Violet, whom he considers 'stuck-up', and he desires his son to wed Mary. Needless to say, Sir Geoffrey is also displeased, and the fathers disown their sons. The latter retire in disgrace to a miserable London rooming house, where they try to earn an independence by writing.

The fathers, after a few months, become so profoundly miserable without their boys that they follow them and find out from Belinda, the 'slavey', that the sons are at the point of starving. Miss Champneys also arrives with a chicken and other delicacies, and Violet and Mary come to discover if their lovers are still faithful. After a few more misunderstandings, the boys are forgiven and taken back into favour. Miss Champneys has designs on the butterman's hand and heart. Sir Geoffrey gives a speech of understanding.
