= Society (play) =

Comedy drama by T. W. Robertson

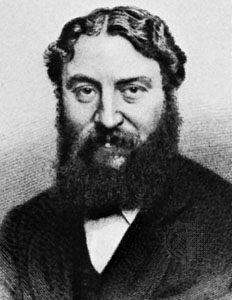
Engraving of T. W. Robertson

Society was a comedy drama by T. W. Robertson, premiered in 1865, regarded as a milestone in Victorian drama because of its realism in sets, costume, acting and dialogue. The piece, set in Victorian London's literary and theatrical bohemia, depicts "the efforts of an illiterate millionaire to introduce his son into 'society', and the equally vigorous efforts of 'society' to repel the intruder". Unusually for that time, Robertson both wrote and directed the play, and his innovative writing and stage direction inspired George Bernard Shaw and W. S. Gilbert, among others.

== Background and premiere ==
Beginning his career by 1851, T. W. Robertson had met with little success as an actor, playwright and journalist. In 1864 he wrote David Garrick, an adaptation of Mélesville's comedy Sullivan; it starred Edward Askew Sothern. The play's success advanced the Robertson's career. Encouraged, he wrote a new comic play, Society, with Sothern in mind, but the actor was unavailable.

Society was rejected by many theatrical managers in London before finally being produced at the Prince of Wales's Theatre, Liverpool, through the influence of Robertson's friend H. J. Byron, under the management of A. Henderson, opening on 8 May 1865. There it was a critical and popular success. Byron recommended the play to Effie Wilton, who had begun managing the Prince of Wales's Theatre in London's West End; Byron had been writing Victorian burlesques for her. Producing the play was a risk for a theatre manager to take: in his introduction to his edition of Society, Thomas Edgar Pemberton writes:

The supposed danger lay in the simplicity of the play. True to nature it might be, but audiences accustomed to theatrical types verging on the border-land of caricature would (so managers thought) be hardly likely to accept a mere photograph of human life. Wilton ... estimated Society at its true worth, declared that danger was better than dullness, selected her supporters, and under the now delighted author's superintendence, commenced rehearsals.

Society opened at the Prince of Wales's on 11 November 1865. Wilton starred in the play opposite Squire Bancroft, who went on to marry her in 1867 and become her co-manager.

== Success and aftermath ==
Pemberton wrote that on the morning after the London opening, "Robertson awoke to find himself famous. ... [T]he fortunes of a luckless theatre and a hitherto misunderstood dramatist were made." In a highly favourable notice the reviewer in The Times wrote, "The piece was vehemently applauded from beginning to end. Success could not be more unequivocal". Society's run of 150 performances, closing on 4 May 1866, established the fortunes of the struggling theatre, as well as those of the playwright. Another row of stalls had to be added at the theatre, and the Prince of Wales came to see the play. In Society, Robertson popularized naturalism in contemporary British drama; he looked at the world around him and tried to reproduce it realistically on stage; the characters act like people of their day, and Robertson's form of drawing room play became known as "cup and saucer drama", because real cups and saucers were used as props.

The success of Society encouraged Robertson to continue along the same realistic path in a series of plays that dealt seriously and sensitively with social issues of the day: Ours (1866), Caste (1867), Play (1868), School (1869), and M.P. (1870). The London stage was at once inundated with imitations of the new style of acting and the new kind of play. These plays, together with Society, inspired playwrights such as W. S. Gilbert and George Bernard Shaw. Gilbert's biographer Andrew Crowther wrote that Society "was written in a colloquial style that came as a breath of fresh air after the bombast and staginess of much of the drama of that age. ... [Robertson] gained a reputation as a theatre reformer, with his gift for easy, natural-seeming dialogue and his appreciation of what we would now call subtext – the idea that apparently trivial conversations can hide deep emotions." A reviewer wrote:

Society and Ours prepared the way for a complete reformation of the modern drama, and ... Caste has thrown aside all doubt. ... The scene-painter, the carpenter, and the costumier no longer usurp the place of the author and actor. ... Robertson has succeeded in concentrating an accumulation of incident and satire more interesting and more poignant than might be found in all the sensational dramas of the last half-century. The whole secret of his success is – truth!

Robertson directed his own plays, which was a radical change from the usual system in Victorian theatre of the manager of the theatre company staging the work around its star player. Squire Bancroft later said, "[H]ow much of the success I was fortunate enough to achieve [in Society] was due to the encouragement and support I received from the author, who spared no pains ... to have his somewhat novel type of characters understood and acted as he wished." W. S. Gilbert said of Robertson's directorial innovations: "I frequently attended his rehearsals and learnt a great deal from his method of stage-management, which in those days was quite a novelty, although most pieces are now stage-managed on the principles he introduced. I look upon stage-management, as now understood, as having been absolutely invented by him." Wilton's giving Robertson directorial control over his plays was a key step to institutionalising the power that directors wield in the theatre today.

Society was revived several times during the next two decades, and it was given nearly 500 performances under Wilton's (later the Bancrofts') management. Robertson's original manuscript of Society was donated to the Shakespeare Memorial Library at Stratford-upon-Avon.

== Original cast ==
- Maud Hetherington – Effie Wilton
- Sidney Daryl – Squire Bancroft
- Lord Ptarmigant – John Hare
- John Chodd, Jnr – John Clarke
- Tom Stylus – Fred Dewar
- Lady Ptarmigant – Sophie Larkin
