= Caste (play) =

Comedy drama by T. W. Robertson

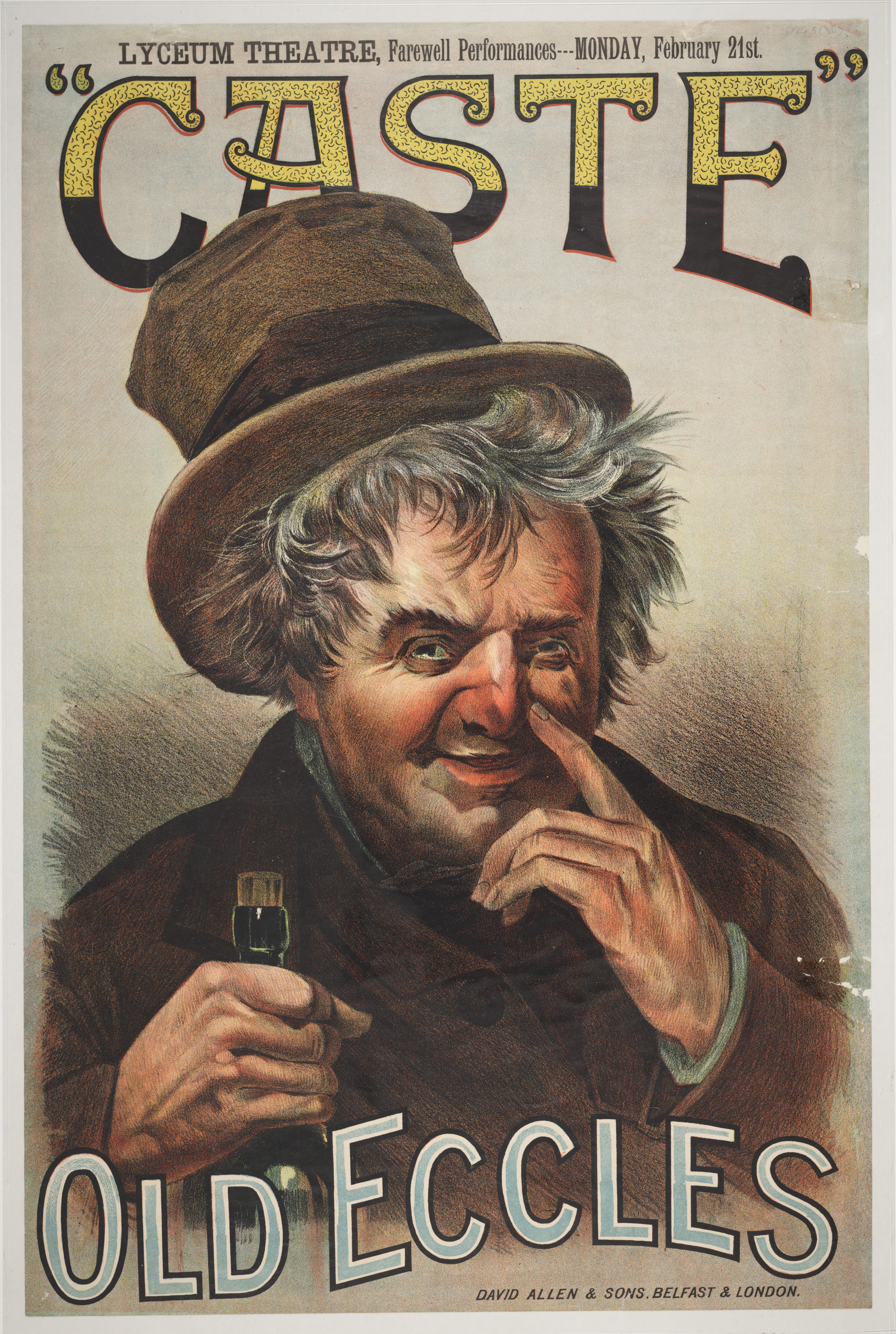
1887 poster for Caste

Caste is a comedy drama by T. W. Robertson, first seen in 1867. The play was the third of several successes by Robertson produced in London's West End by Squire Bancroft and his wife Marie Wilton. As its name suggests, Caste concerns distinctions of class and rank. Captain George D'Alroy, the son of a French nobleman, marries a lower-class ballet dancer, Esther Eccles, and then goes to war, leaving her pregnant. When word arrives that he has been killed in action, his mother tries to wrest the child from his penniless widow, who struggles to manage her family and preserve her dignity.

After its 1867 London premiere, the play was presented frequently in both Britain and the United States.

== History and early productions ==
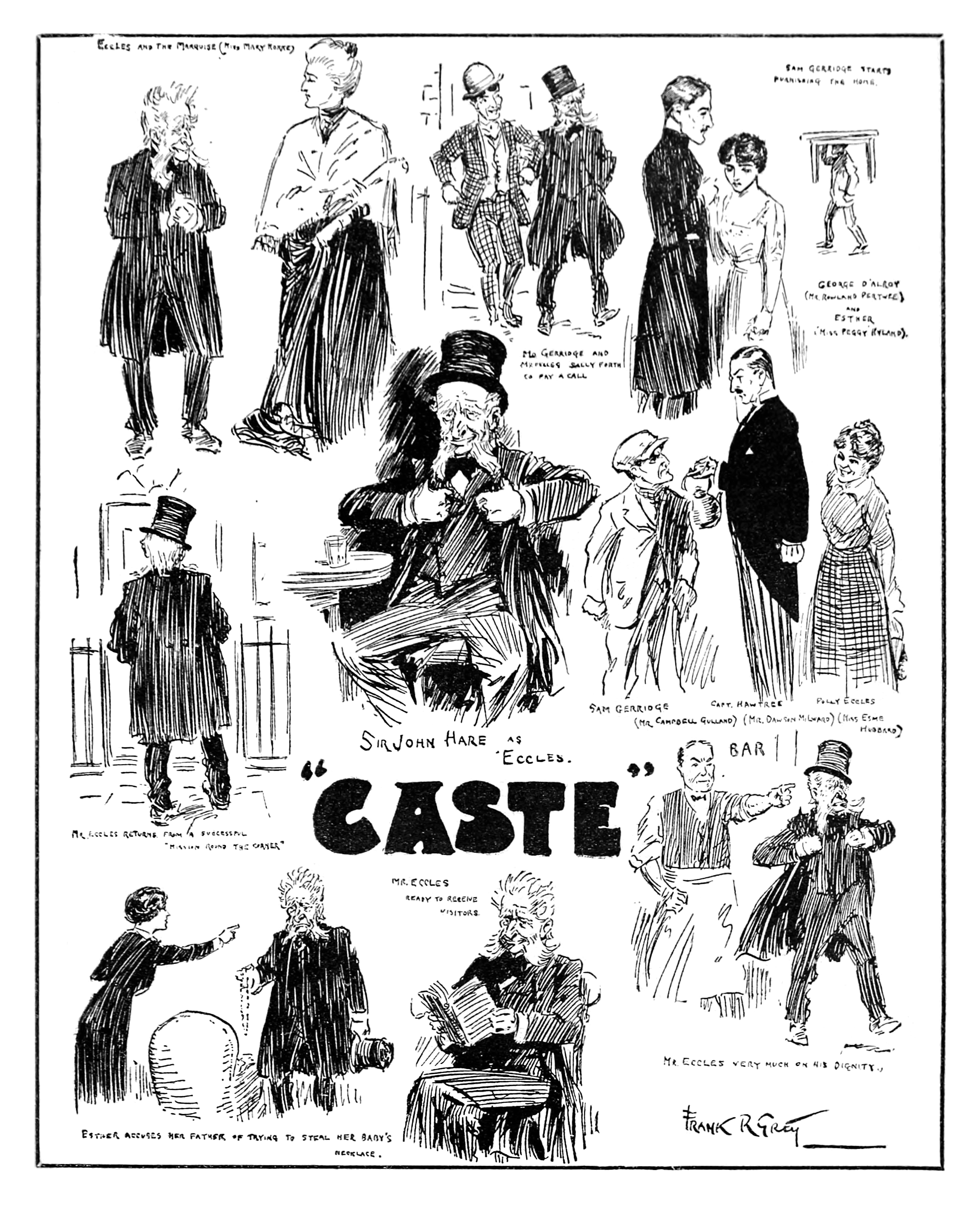
Illustrator Frank R. Grey sketched scenes from the 1915 film adaption of Caste for Pictures and The Picturegoer magazine (March 4, 1916)

Caste is based on the short story "The Poor Rate Unfolds a Tale", written by Thomas William Robertson in 1866 for Rates and Taxes, a Christmas publication edited by Tom Hood.

The play was first seen on 6 April 1867 at the Prince of Wales' Theatre, produced by Squire Bancroft and his wife, the actress Marie Wilton, to whom it was dedicated. They had produced Robertson's plays Society in 1865 and Ours in 1866. These plays are written, and were directed, in a naturalistic style that was novel for the time, in which the characters behave like real people, with settings and stage properties that add realism to the drama. The actors were in sympathy with this style, and the plays were successful. Caste, in the same vein, was particularly enduring; during the next few years it was revived three times at the same theatre, totalling 650 performances under the Bancroft management.

W. S. Gilbert's one-act farce Allow Me to Explain (1867) ran as a companion piece to Caste. The popularity of Caste led to further Robertson and Bancroft successes: Play (1868), School (1869), and M.P. (1870). A reviewer of the opening night of the play wrote:

Society and Ours prepared the way for a complete reformation of the modern drama, and until the curtain fell on Saturday night it remained a question whether Mr. Robertson would be able to hold the great reputation which those pieces conferred upon him. The production of Caste has thrown aside all doubt. The reformation is complete, and Mr. Robertson stands preeminent as the dramatist of this generation. The scene-painter, the carpenter, and the costumier no longer usurp the place of the author and actor. With the aid of only two simple scenes, a boudoir in Mayfair and a humble lodging in Lambeth, Mr. Robertson has succeeded in concentrating an accumulation of incident and satire more interesting and more poignant than might be found in all the sensational dramas of the last half century. The whole secret of his success is truth!

== Synopsis ==
Act I

"The little house in Stangate — Courtship."

In 1867, Captain George D'Alroy, whose mother is the Marquise de St. Maur, is in love with the beautiful ballet dancer Esther Eccles, who comes from a poor family. He wants advice and brings his fellow officer Captain Hawtree to meet Esther. Hawtree says, "the thing is out of the question.... Caste! – the inexorable law of caste! The social law... that commands like to mate with like".

Esther's father comes in. He is a drunkard and does not work; he leaves when George gives him a half sovereign. Esther and her sister Polly (also a ballet dancer) arrive and they get tea ready. Polly establishes a friendly banter with Hawtree as he helps. Sam Gerridge, Polly's young man, takes a dislike to Hawtree, and after Hawtree leaves, Sam says, "People should stick to their own class. Life's a railway journey, and Mankind's a passenger – first class, second class, third class."

Esther gets a letter to say she has got an engagement for work in Manchester, and George, not wanting her to leave, asks her to marry him.

"A lapse of eight months."

Act II

"The lodgings in Mayfair — Matrimony."

George and Esther are married. He tries to get the courage to tell her he must leave to join his regiment; Hawtree comes to see if he is ready. George's mother the Marquise, who does not know he is married, visits. She knows he is to go on active service, and, since she is of a family of soldiers, quotes passages from the Chronicles of Froissart. Esther, in the next room, overhears their conversation and comes in, fainting. The Marquise learns of the marriage and meets Esther, Polly, Sam and Mr Eccles, all of whom she regards with contempt; they react indignantly. George and Hawtree leave to join their regiment and go to India.

"A lapse of twelve months."

Act III

"The little house in Stangate — Widowhood."

Esther is told that George has been killed in India. She moves home to Stangate to live with her fiery-tempered sister Polly, because the money left to her was lost by her father on gambling. She has a baby and wonders if she will ever find love again. Polly is expecting to marry Sam, and he has gone into business as a gasfitter.

The Marquise arrives; she got a letter from Mr Eccles saying that Esther needed assistance. She wants to take the baby back with her, but Esther refuses. Mr Eccles is disappointed when the Marquise goes without leaving any money. Esther goes to lie down. Sam asks Mr Eccles if he can marry Polly, and he acquiesces when Sam (unnoticed by Polly) says he would supply him with alcohol and tobacco.

George, not dead in spite of reports, arrives and meets Polly and Sam. Polly breaks the news to Esther, while George is out of the room, by acting excerpts from the ballet Jeanne la folle, or, the Return of the Soldier, which Esther remembers. George explains that he was taken prisoner in India but managed to escape. The Marquise is overjoyed that her son has returned, and is reconciled to Esther.

Hawtree, however, who is now a Major but has no title, gets a letter informing him that the girl he hoped to marry, daughter of a countess, is to marry a son of a marquis – Caste has thwarted him. He says, "Best to marry in your own rank of life." George says, "But if ever you find the girl, marry her."

== Characters and original cast ==
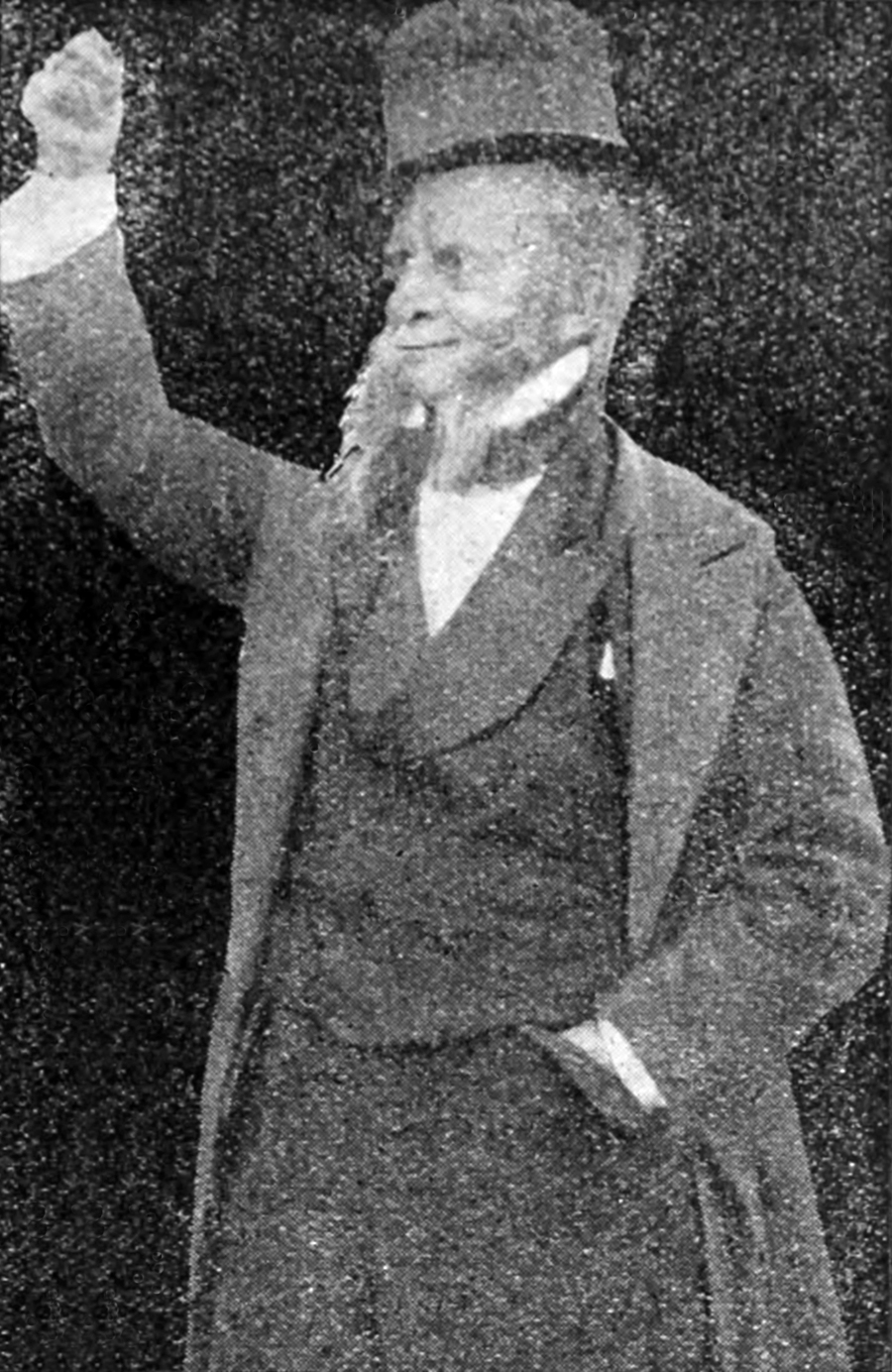
John Hare as Eccles in Caste (1915)

- Hon. George d'Alroy, a young nobleman – Frederick Younge
- Captain Hawtree, George's friend – Squire Bancroft
- Eccles, Esther's father, a drunkard and gambler – George Honey
- Sam Gerridge, Polly's fiance – John Hare
- Marquise de St. Maur, George's mother – Sophie Larkin
- Esther Eccles, a ballet dancer – Marie Wilton
- Polly Eccles, Esther's temperamental sister – Lydia Foote

== Subsequent productions ==
The first production in the United States opened at the Old Broadway Theatre on 5 August 1867. The cast included William Pleater Davidge as Eccles, Henrietta Chanfrau as Esther and Mrs. G. H. Gilbert as Polly. It also played in Boston, Massachusetts, at the Howard Athenaeum, from 2 September 1867, and at The Boston Museum from September 22, 1867. It was back in New York at Wallack's Theatre from 8 November 1873, Boston at the Globe Theatre, from 8 November 1875, Wallack's again in October 1889, the Garrick Theatre in London from 5 February 1895, Grand Theatre, London, from 16 October 1896, Knickerbocker Theatre, New York, from18 January 1897, and Tremont Theatre, Boston, from 2 March 1897. The piece was played in numerous other unauthorized productions in its early decades. Early in the 20th century, it returned to Broadway at the Empire Theatre from April to June 1910 and at the Mansfield Theatre in December 1927. The play has also been popular with amateur companies, which continued to present it into the 20th century.

A 150th anniversary production of the play ran at the Finborough Theatre, London, in April 2017, the first UK production in over 20 years. The cast included Paul Bradley as Eccles and Susan Penhaligon as the Marquise.

== Adaptations ==
Caste was adapted for a 1915 British film directed by Laurence Trimble. Sir John Hare made his first appearance in motion pictures, reprising his acclaimed stage portrayal of Eccles. Other cast included Esme Hubbard (Polly Eccles), Campbell Gullan (Sam Gerridge), Peggy Hyland (Esther), Dawson Milward (Captain Hawtree), Roland Pertwee (George d'Alroy) and Mary Rorke (The Marquise) It is believed to be a lost film.

A film was made of the play in 1930; it featured Sebastian Shaw as George d'Alroy and Hermione Baddeley as Polly Eccles, and was directed by Campbell Gullan. Michael Powell (who later made films with Emeric Pressburger) was an additional uncredited director. The period of the play was moved to 1914–15.

A TV play of Caste was made in 1954 by the BBC; it featured Robin Bailey as George d'Alroy and Jill Bennett as Polly Eccles.
