= Scala Theatre =

Former theatre in London, England

Coordinates: 51°31′12.2″N 0°8′10.0″W

- Interactive map of the Scala Theatre area

General information
- Location: 58 Charlotte Street, London, England
- Opened: 23 September 1905
- Closed: 1969
- Demolished: 1972

Design and construction
- Architect: Frank Verity

Other information
- Seating capacity: 1,111

The Scala Theatre was a theatre in Charlotte Street, London, off Tottenham Court Road. The theatre began as concert rooms in the late 18th century. It then became a private theatre club in 1802, a circus in 1808, and a proper theatre in 1810. It was operated by a succession of managers under different names until 1835. From 1839 to 1865, under the scenic artist Charles James, it became the home of lurid melodrama and acquired a poor reputation.

In 1865 the theatre was reconstructed with an elegant interior, known as the Prince of Wales's Theatre (not to be confused with the later Prince of Wales Theatre). H. J. Byron, one of the theatre's leading playwrights, and Marie Wilton, its leading lady, assumed its management, presenting burlesque, farce and prose comedies by Byron and a celebrated series of plays by T. W. Robertson. In 1867, Wilton married Squire Bancroft, the theatre's leading man. Other plays were by W. S. Gilbert, Edward Bulwer-Lytton, Richard Brinsley Sheridan, Dion Boucicault and Clement Scott. The Bancrofts managed the theatre until 1880. Edgar Bruce took over the management until 1882, when the theatre went dark, and from 1886 it was used as a Salvation Army Hostel until it was demolished in 1903.

In 1903 Edmund Distin Maddick bought the property and enlarged the site. A new theatre, designed by Frank Verity after the manner of Palladio and managed by Johnston Forbes-Robertson, opened in 1905 as The Scala Theatre. It was considered to be the most beautiful theatre in London. Robertson's management was brief and not particularly successful. The theatre then gave special matinees and occasional evening performances over the next few years. In 1911, it was taken over by Charles Urban and showed the earliest colour films. During the First World War films continued to be shown from time to time, including The Birth of a Nation in 1915.

From 1918 once again live drama was staged. During the early 1920s the Scala was opened only on rare occasions. It was intermittently used as a recording studio for orchestral works. Eva Turner and others in the Carl Rosa Opera Company appeared in a season there in 1924. The house then principally housed amateur productions with an occasional professional Christmas production. From the mid-1930s the Gang Show appeared each year, and the D'Oyly Carte Opera Company occupied it for a seven-week season in 1938. During the Second World War the theatre again hosted professional companies, and from 1945 it presented Peter Pan annually until its closure in 1969. It was soon demolished and rebuilt as a mixed development of offices and other structures, known as Scala House. The Other Cinema, in the basement of the building, showed avant-garde films in late 1976 and early 1977 and reopened as Scala Cinema in 1978. In 1980 Scala House was taken over by Channel 4 television, and soon the former Odeon King's Cross cinema in Pentonville Road was renamed Scala Cinema.

== Origins ==
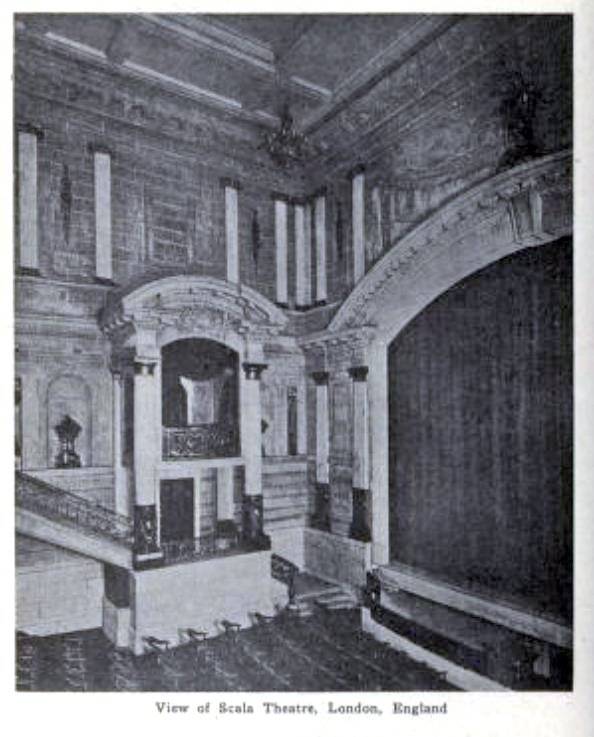
The Scala in 1917

The theatre began on this site, in 1772 as The New Rooms in Tottenham Street. Concerts were performed there under the management of Francis Pasquali. Popularity and royal patronage led to the building's enlargement by James Wyatt, and its renaming as the King's Concert Rooms (1780–1786). It then became Rooms for Concerts of Ancient Music and Hyde's Rooms (1786–1802), managed by The Directors of Concerts and Ancient Music.

In 1802, a private theatre club managed by Captain Caulfield, the "Pic-Nics", occupied the building and named it the Cognoscenti Theatre (1802–1808). The rooms briefly housed a circus in 1808, before J. Paul, a gunsmith whose wife had theatrical aspirations, had the building fitted up as a theatre, adding an entrance portico and extending the site to Pitt Street (now called Scala Street). It opened on 23 April 1810 with Love in a Village, a ballad opera by Isaac Bickerstaff and Thomas Arne.

The theatre historians Mander and Mitchenson record that Paul spent £4,000 on the theatre, but it was not a success and he was obliged to sell out in 1814 for £315. It continued under a succession of managers as the unsuccessful Regency Theatre (1815–1820), falling into decline. The theatre then reopened as the West London Theatre (1820–1831), Queen's Theatre (1831–1833, 1835–1837, and 1839–1865), and Fitzroy Theatre (1833–1835). The lessee of the theatre from 1839 to 1865 was a scenic artist, Charles James James, and the theatre became the home of lurid melodrama, being nicknamed The Dusthole. It acquired the reputation of being the lowest theatre in London.

== Prince of Wales's Royal Theatre 1865–1882 ==
In 1865, the theatre was reconstructed, reopening as the Prince of Wales's Royal Theatre by permission of the future Edward VII, who attended its inauguration on 15 April 1865. James retained the leasehold of the theatre but H. J. Byron and Marie Wilton assumed its management. They began with a triple-bill consisting of a comedy, a burlesque by Byron, and a farce. The Morning Herald described the opening night as "a brilliant success; every part of the house was densely crowded, and hundreds were unable to gain admission", and predicted that under "the popular actress and great favourite Miss Marie Wilton" the reputation of the theatre would be restored. The paper described the auditorium:

The interior of the building has been reconstructed and elegantly decorated, commodious stalls have been added, and the private boxes have been neatly and comfortably fitted up. Light green is the prevailing colour, the decorations being brought out tastefully in white and gold, the combination producing a cool and pleasing effect. The lighting of the audience part of the house by means of a chandelier from the ceiling has been dispensed with, and the modern mode of a sun-light in the centre substituted—a great advantage in a small house, (Note: According to a list published in 1870, the average capacity of London's 37 theatres was slightly over 1,900 seats. With a capacity of 814 the Prince of Wales's was the sixth-smallest.) not only with regard to the brilliancy of the light obtained, but also in giving a clear open space.

Wilton had an eye for rising talent, and among the performers in her original company were Fanny Josephs, Bella Goodall and Squire Bancroft (under his real name, Sydney Bancroft). It was in the following November that the house presented Society, the first of a celebrated series of plays by T. W. Robertson, which in the view of Mander and Mitchenson changed the course of English drama. Society is a comedy depicting what one critic called "the efforts of an illiterate millionaire to introduce his son into 'society', and the equally vigorous efforts of 'society' to repel the intruder". In a highly favourable notice the reviewer in The Times wrote, "The piece was vehemently applauded from beginning to end. Success could not be more unequivocal". Society ran for 26 weeks – 150 performances – a notable run for the time, establishing the fortunes of both the theatre and the author.

Wilton presented three more burlesques by Byron, and he agreed to write his first prose comedies, War to the Knife (a success in 1865) and A Hundred Thousand Pounds (1866). He left the partnership in 1867, succeeded as Wilton's business partner by James. In the same year Wilton married Bancroft, her leading man, who later joined her in the management of the theatre. The Bancrofts acquired a share in the lease from James and remained at the theatre until 1880. The house staged further successful domestic drama-comedies by Robertson: Ours (1866), Caste (1867), Play (1868), School (1869), and M.P. (1870). Other plays were W. S. Gilbert's Allow Me To Explain (1867; this ran as a companion piece to Robertson's Caste) and Sweethearts (1874), as well as Tame Cats (1868), Lytton's Money (1872), The School for Scandal (1874), a revival of Boucicault's London Assurance (1877), and Diplomacy (Clement Scott's 1878 adaptation of Sardou's Dora). A number of prominent actors played at the theatre during this period, among them John Hare, Charles Coghlan, the Kendals, and Ellen Terry.

Edgar Bruce took over the management until 1882, and presented Geneviève Ward in several plays. His biggest success was F. C. Burnand's aesthetic burlesque The Colonel, which ran for 550 performances, transferring to the Imperial Theatre. Bruce acted in some of the productions as also did Herbert Beerbohm Tree, then near the start of his career. During 1882 there was a dispute between Wilton, James and Bruce about who was to be responsible for the alterations on which the Metropolitan Board of Works insisted if the theatre were to be allowed to remain open to the public. As Bruce had made so much money out of The Colonel, both in London and on tour, he was able to leave the Prince of Wales's and built his own West End theatre, originally called the Princes and, from 1886, the Prince of Wales Theatre.

In 1882 the old Prince of Wales's went dark, and from 1886 the theatre buildings were used as a Salvation Army Hostel, until it was demolished in 1903.

== Scala Theatre 1905–1969 ==
Interior of the Scala, 1904, showing the unusual staircase underneath the royal box

In 1903 Edmund Distin Maddick bought the property, and adjoining properties, and enlarged the site. The main entrance was now in Charlotte Street, and the old portico in Tottenham Street became the stage door. The new theatre, designed by Frank Verity, opened in 1905, as The Scala Theatre, seating 1,139 and boasting a large stage. The interior was unusual with stairways from either side of the dress circle leading down to the stalls, passing under the boxes. It is this feature that gave its name to the theatre, scala being the Italian for staircase. The chief motif of the decoration was the superimposing of the Doric and Ionic orders, after the manner of Palladio. It was carried out in Pavonazzo marble and stone composite with wrought iron and other metal embellishments. The theatre was in two tiers, the gallery rising behind the upper circle.

The opening ceremony was performed by Lady Bancroft (as Wilton had by then become) on 19 December 1904. She made a speech, at the end of which W. S. Gilbert said that he had been at the back of the dress circle where he had heard every word; he added that her voice was as beautiful as ever, and that if she continued to take pains and work hard, she might be sure of having a great career behind her. One drama critic called the Scala the most beautiful theatre in London, possibly in the world, a view echoed by a colleague in The Musical Times two decades later.

The Scala opened to the public in September 1905 under the management of Johnston Forbes-Robertson, who produced The Conqueror and then a revival of For the Crown and in November a new play by Madeleine Lucette Ryley, Mrs Grundy. In all three plays, his wife, Gertrude Elliott, was the leading lady. His management was not particularly successful. After he left, the theatre was mainly used only for special matinees and occasional performances over the next few years.

In 1911 the Scala was taken over by Charles Urban, one of the pioneers of the cinema. For the next three years until 1914 the public saw the earliest colour films, "Kinemacolor" and another innovation "Kinoplastikon", the screenless cinema. During the First World War films continued to be shown from time to time, including The Birth of a Nation in 1915.

F. J. Nettlefold took the theatre in 1918 and once again live drama was staged. Matheson Lang appeared in The Purple Mask. In January 1919 Martin Harvey appeared in The Burgomaster of Stilemonde at a charity matinee. The following Christmas the Reandean Company presented Fifinella, a musical fantasy by Barry Jackson and Basil Dean. During the early 1920s the Scala (known for a time as the New Scala) was opened only on rare occasions. It was intermittently a classical music venue, used as a recording studio for large-scale orchestral works: Sir Henry Wood, Sir Thomas Beecham, Sir Hamilton Harty and Felix Weingartner all made recordings of Beethoven symphonies there for the Columbia label, and Eva Turner and her colleagues in the Carl Rosa Opera Company appeared in a season there in 1924 with a repertory that included Beethoven's Fidelio, which had not been staged in London since Beecham's 1910 opera season. Other operas staged were Lohengrin, Samson and Delilah, The Tales of Hoffmann, Madame Butterfly and Carmen.

In 1925 Distin Maddick sold the theatre to A. E. Abrahams and from then on the house was principally the home of amateur productions with an occasional professional Christmas production. From the mid-1930s Ralph Reader's Gang Show appeared at the Scala each year and the D'Oyly Carte Opera Company occupied it for a seven-week season from May 1938, with a repertoire of eleven Gilbert and Sullivan operas plus Cox and Box by Burnand and Sullivan.

After the outbreak of the Second World War the theatre again housed professional companies. In 1943 Eileen Herlie appeared in revivals of Rebecca and Peg o'My Heart. Later the same year the theatre became the home of the United States Army Theatre Unit. At Christmas 1943 Tom Arnold and Ivor Novello presented a musical version of Alice in Wonderland dramatised by Clemence Dane with music by Richard Addinsell and a cast headed by Sybil Thorndike. In 1944 Donald Wolfit presented and starred in a season of plays by Shakespeare, Ben Jonson and Ibsen, and in 1945 Peter Pan began its association with the Scala and returned there every year until the closure of the theatre in early 1969.

The Scala was used as a filming location in numerous movies including The Halfway House, For Them That Trespass, Stage Fright, Circle of Danger, The Voice of Merrill, The Limping Man, Indiscreet, Idol on Parade, A Hard Day’s Night, and Mister Ten Per Cent.

In 1972 the local authority granted planning permission for the demolition of the theatre and the building of a mixed development of offices and other structures, known as Scala House (25 Tottenham Street).

== Cinema (1976–1980) ==
The Other Cinema opened in October 1976 in the basement of Scala House; it showed avant-garde films and closed in February 1977. The premises reopened as Scala Cinema in June 1978. It showed a daily programme of films. In 1980 Scala House was taken over by Channel 4 television, and in 1981 the former Odeon King's Cross cinema in Pentonville Road was renamed Scala Cinema.

== Plans ==
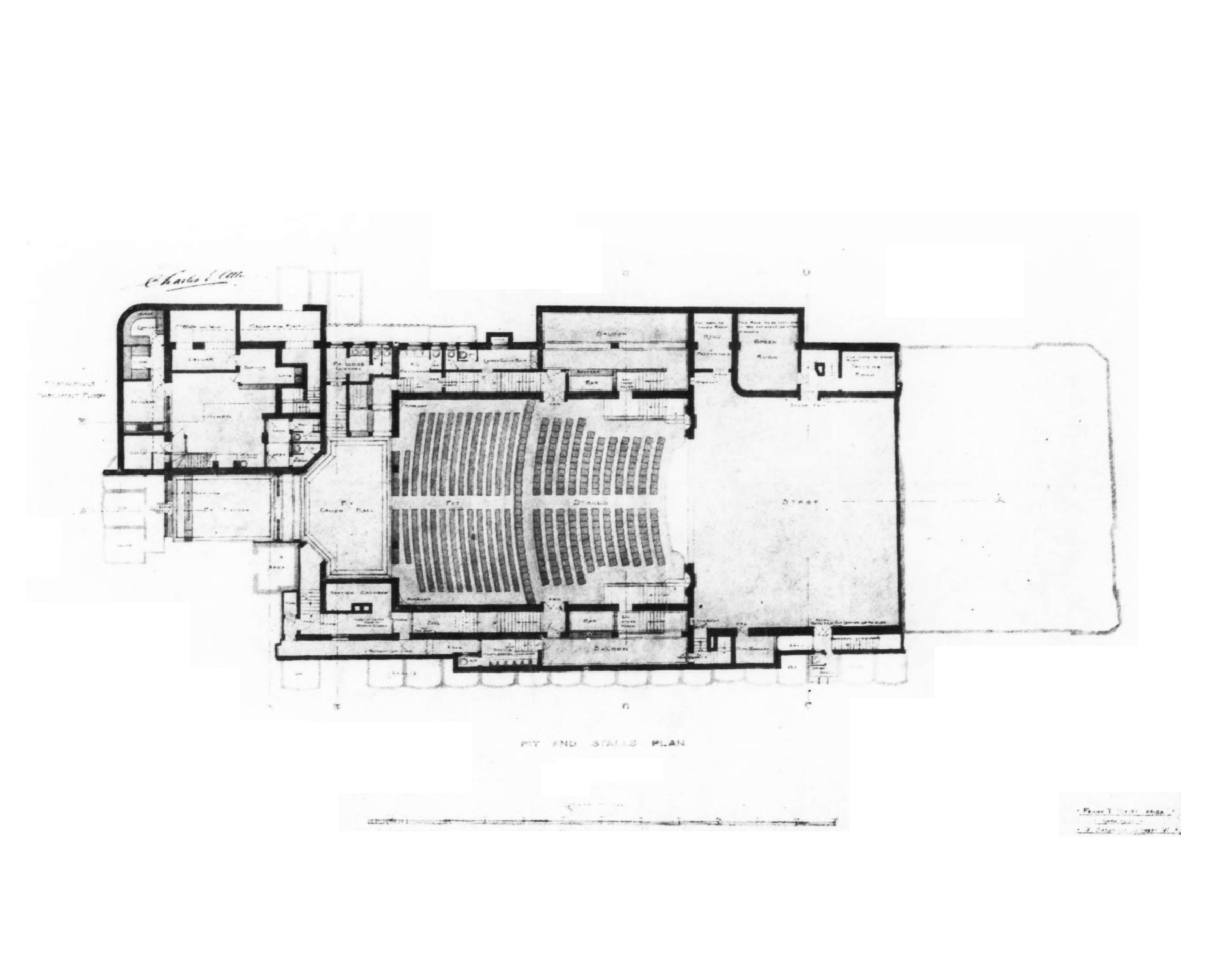
Pit and stalls (floor)

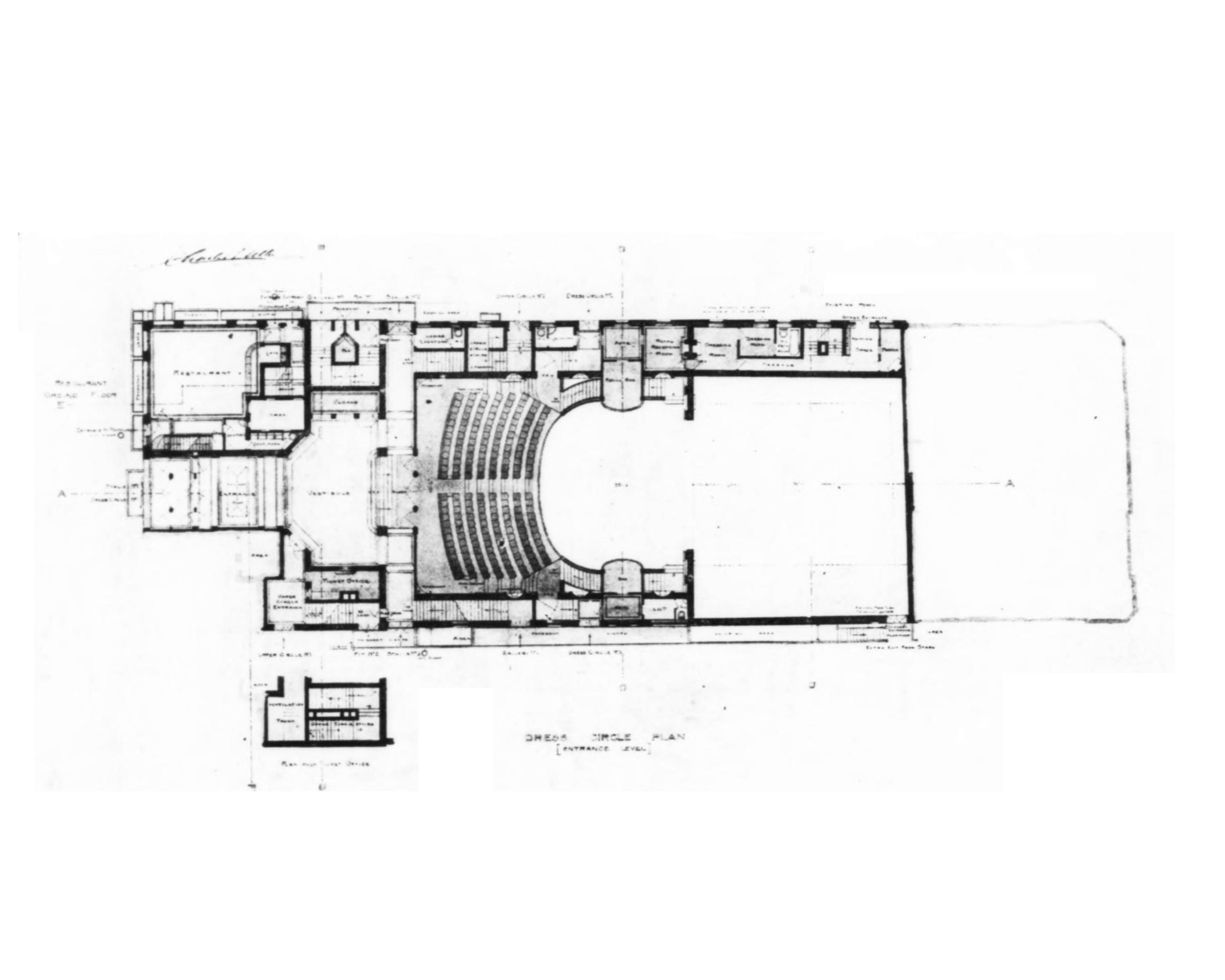
Dress circle (first mezzanine)

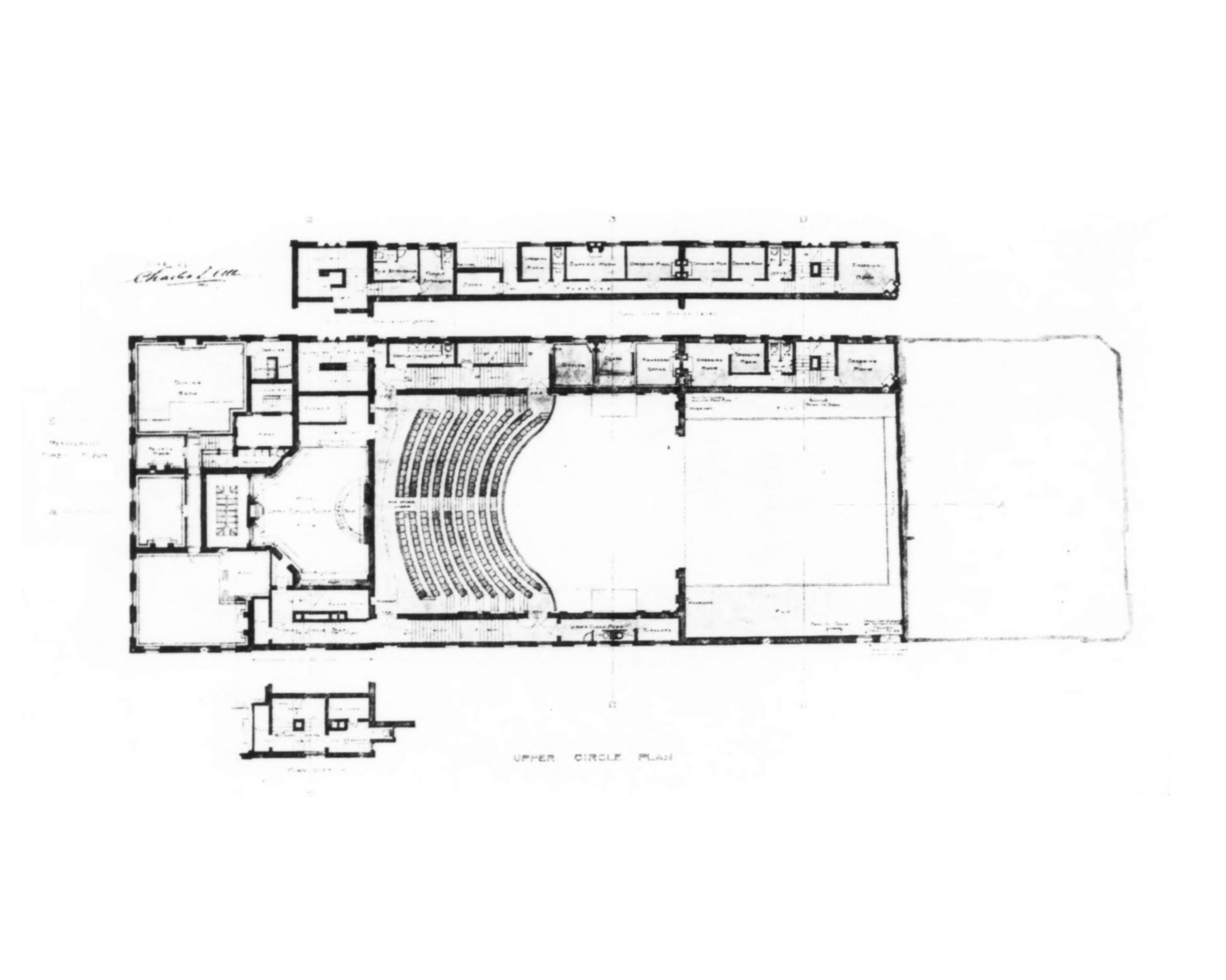
Upper circle (second mezzanine)

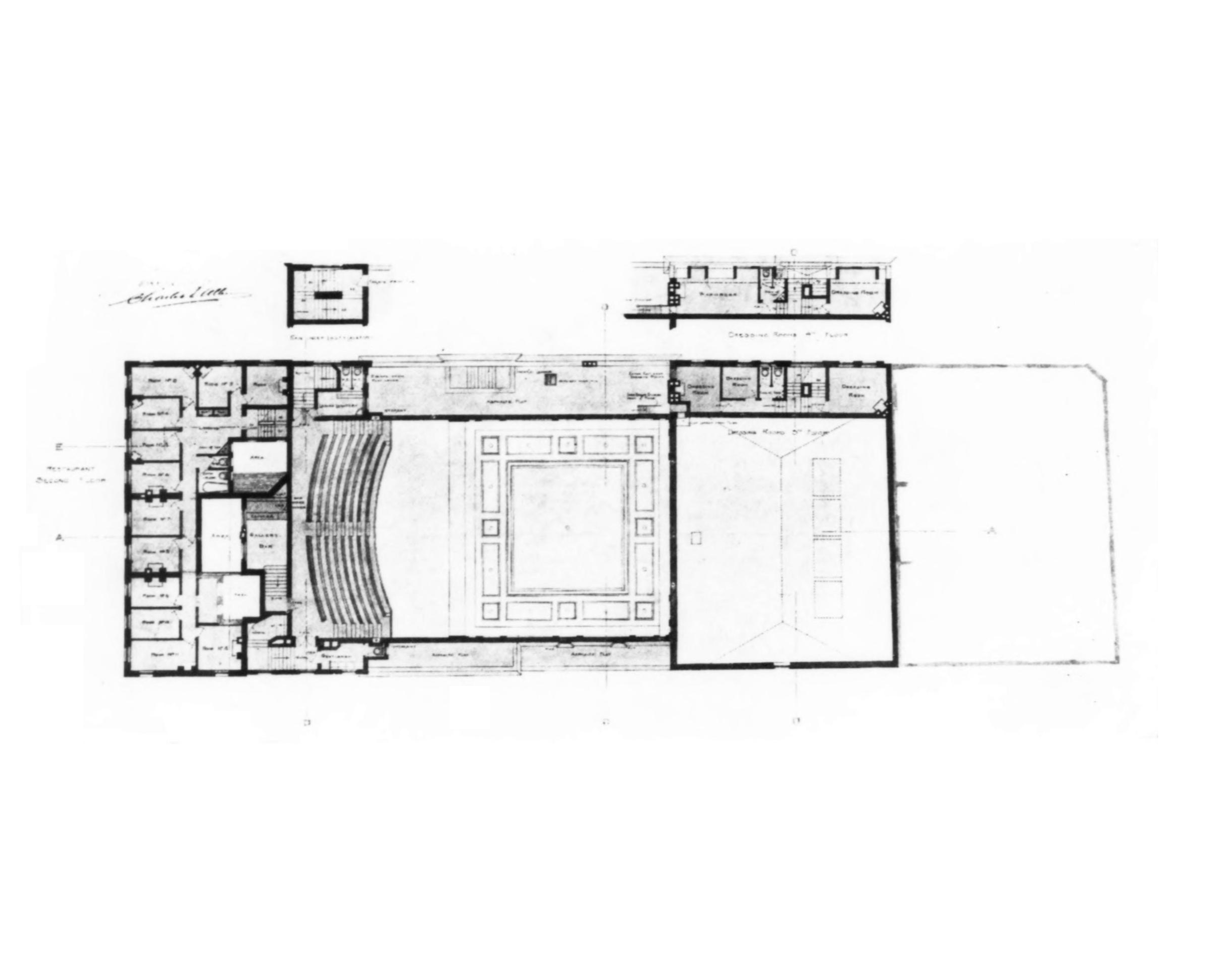
Gallery (third mezzanine)

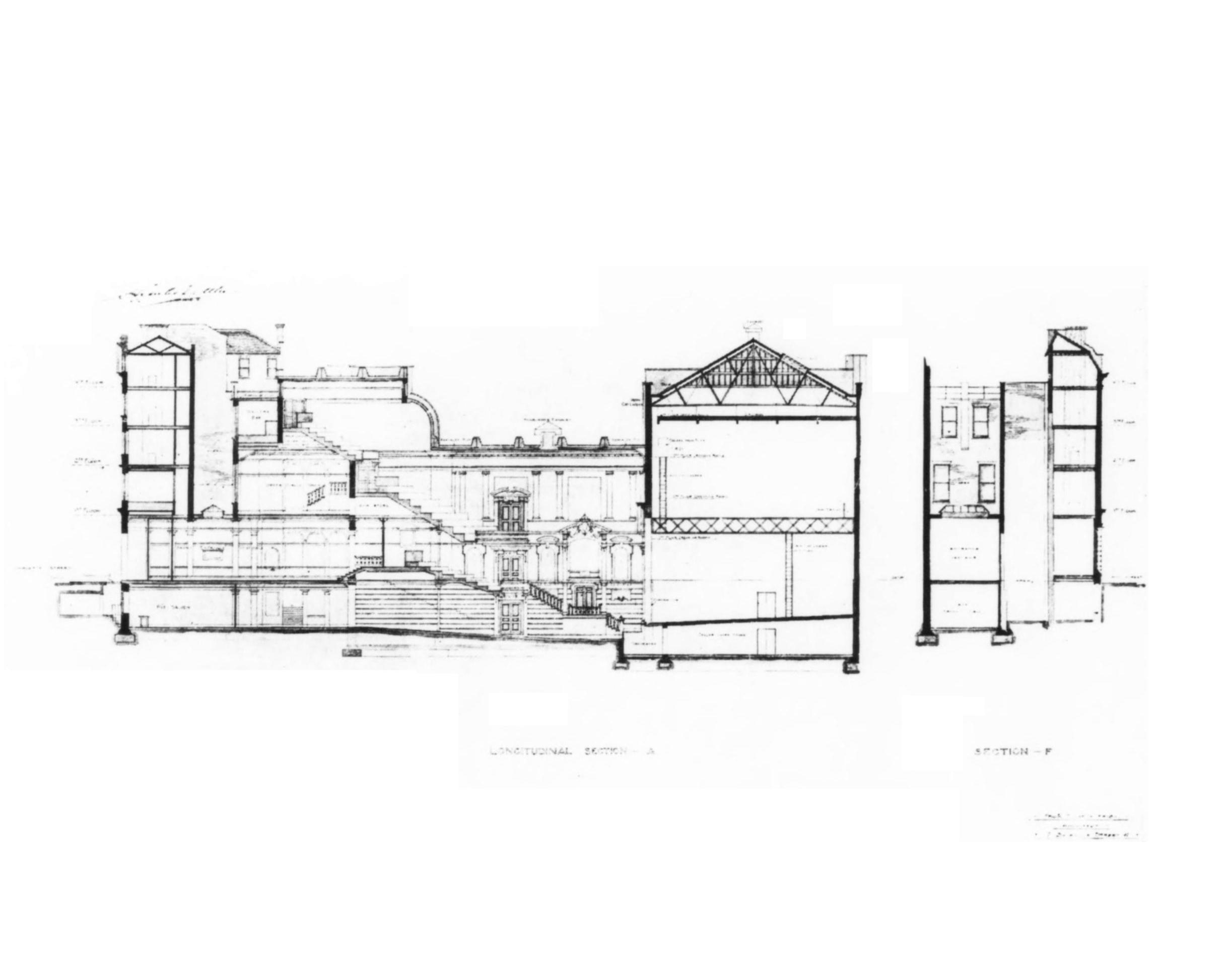
Longitudinal section

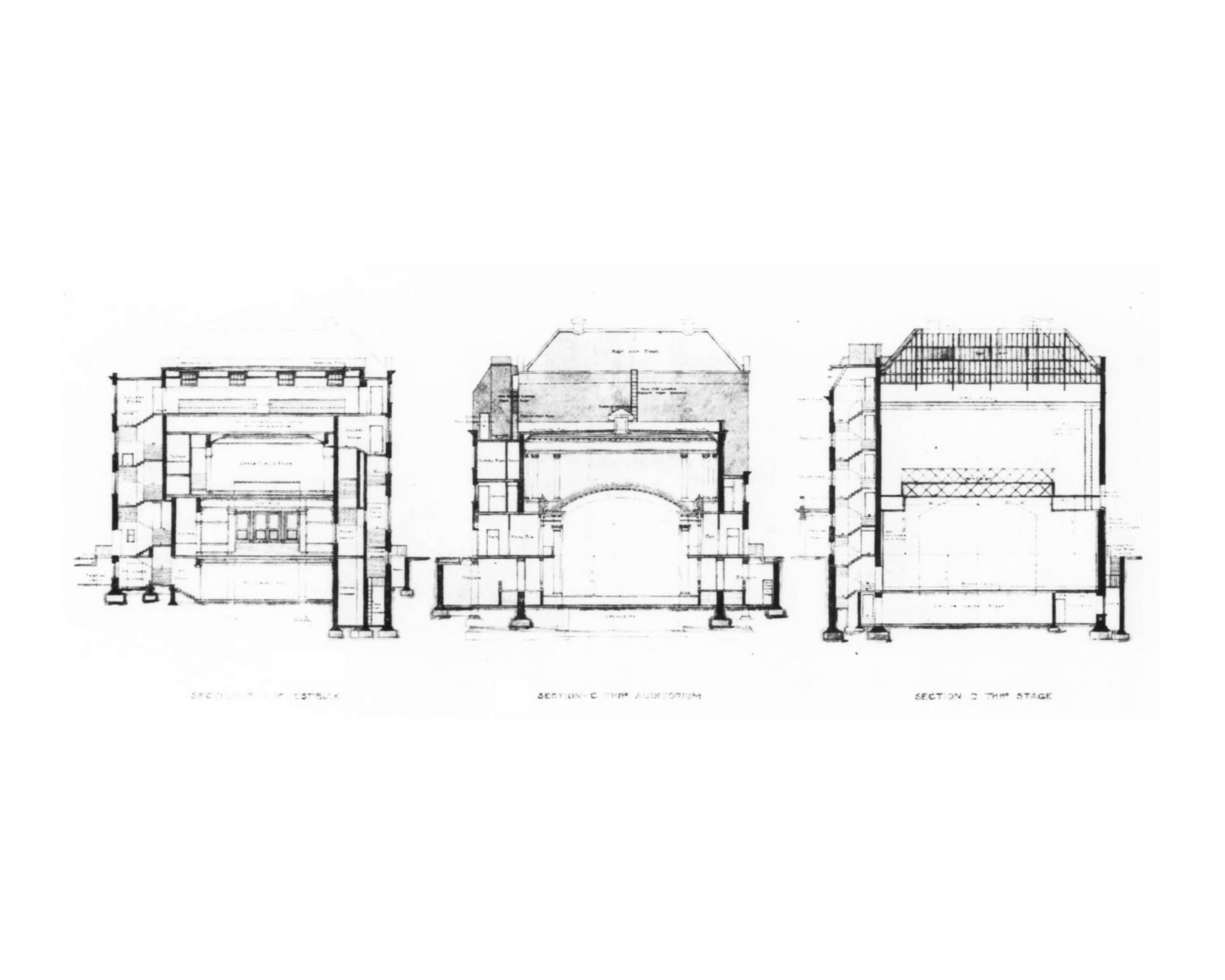
Cross sections

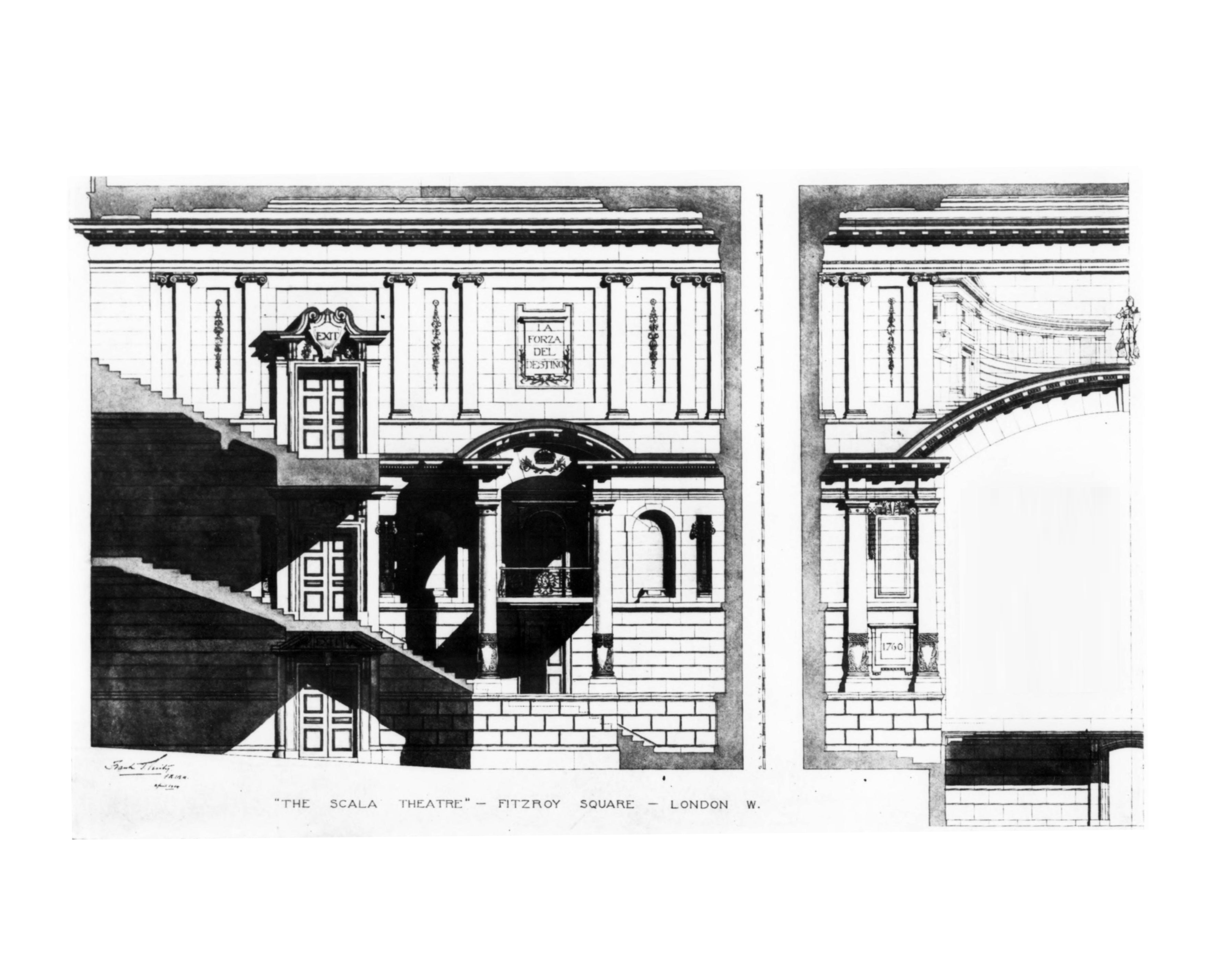
Details

== Notes, references and sources ==
=== Sources ===
- Mander, Raymond; Joe Mitchenson (1976). Lost Theatres of London (fourth ed.). London: New English Library. ISBN 0-45-002838-0.
- Rollins, Cyril; R. John Witts (1962). The D'Oyly Carte Opera Company in Gilbert and Sullivan Operas: A Record of Productions, 1875–1961. London: Michael Joseph. OCLC 504581419.
