= T. W. Robertson =

English dramatist and stage director (1829–1871)

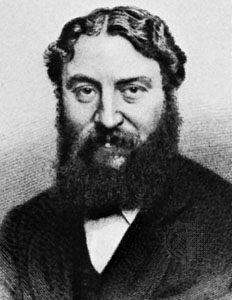
Robertson, 1860s

Thomas William Robertson (9 January 1829 – 3 February 1871) was an English dramatist and stage director known for his development of naturalism in British theatre.

Born to a theatrical family, Robertson began as an actor, but he was not a success and gave up acting in his late 20s. After earning a modest living writing articles for the press, translating and adapting foreign plays and writing several of his own plays he achieved success in 1865 with his play Society, which the actor-manager Marie Wilton presented at a small London theatre, the Prince of Wales's. Over the next five years Robertson wrote five more plays for the Prince of Wales's. Their naturalistic style and treatment of contemporary social issues was in strong contrast to the melodramas and exaggerated theatricality to which the public had been accustomed, and Robertson's plays were box-office and critical successes. Robertson supervised their productions and was a pioneer of modern stage directing.

Among later theatrical figures influenced by Robertson's Prince of Wales's plays and productions were W. S. Gilbert, Arthur Wing Pinero, Bernard Shaw and Harley Granville-Barker. Robertson wrote numerous plays for other theatres, and adapted many foreign plays for the English stage, but few of these made a strong or lasting impression. He strove successfully to improve the financial condition of dramatists, securing payment per performance, a basis that became the norm after his death.

Robertson suffered from heart disease and died at the age of 42 at the height of his fame and popularity.

== Life and career ==
=== Early years ===
Robertson was born in Newark-upon-Trent, Nottinghamshire on 9 January 1829. He came from a long-established theatrical family, active on the English stage since the early 18th century, and was the eldest son of William Shaftoe Robertson and his wife, Margharetta Elisabetta (née Marinus), a Danish-born actress. Robertson senior had been articled to a lawyer, but abandoned the law to become an actor, and was taken on by his uncle's Lincoln Circuit Company, of which he afterwards became manager. Many of Robertson's large family of siblings went on the stage, including his brothers Frederick and Edward, and his sisters Fanny, Elizabeth and Margaret, the last subsequently famous as Madge Kendal. He made his first appearance on the stage in June 1834 at the age of five as Hamish, the son of the title character in Rob Roy, and played roles including Cora's child in Sheridan's Pizarro and the Count's child in Kotzebue's The Stranger.

At the age of seven Robertson was sent to Spalding Academy, and then to a school in Whittlesey, acting with the family's theatrical company during the school holidays. When he was about 15 his schooling ceased and he rejoined the company full-time, not only as an actor, but also, according to his biographer Michael R. Booth, "as a scene painter, songwriter, playwright, prompter, and stage-manager". He wrote stage adaptations of Dickens stories for the company: "The Battle of Life" and "The Haunted Man". Apart from a brief and unsuccessful spell in the Netherlands as an English teacher, he remained with the company until its disbandment in 1849.

=== London ===
Robertson moved to London, earning a meagre living, writing and taking such acting parts as he could get. His biographer T. Edgar Pemberton wrote, "The amount of work that he did there during his early struggling days was prodigious. In addition to writing and adapting plays he contributed stories, essays, and verses to many magazines: dramatic criticisms to several newspapers: and ephemeral work to numerous comic journals".

Friends and associates of Robertson: clockwise from top left, F. C. Burnand, H. J. Byron, W. S. Gilbert and Tom Hood

In 1851 Robertson had a new play presented in the West End, A Night's Adventure, a comic drama set in the time of the Jacobite rising of 1745. He hoped this would be start of a successful career as a dramatist, but the play was not a success, closing after four nights, and he continued to scratch a living as a writer and actor. Together with H. J. Byron, who became a close friend, he put on an entertainment at the Gallery of Illustration, without success. He worked as a prompter at the Olympic Theatre, tried unsuccessfully to join the army, and travelled to Paris with a company giving a season of English plays there. In 1855, while playing at the Queen's Theatre, he met a 19-year-old actress, Elizabeth Burton. (Note: Elizabeth Burton (1836–1865) was born Elizabeth Jane Taylor; she had been a member of the Queen's company since 1852.) They were married in July the following year; they had a son and three daughters. (Note: Their children were Thomas William Shafto, 1857–1895; Elizabeth Phyllis, 1859–1860; Maude Fanny Maria, 1861–1930; and Elizabeth Ruth, 1863–1926.) After their wedding the Robertsons toured Ireland before returning to act in London and the provinces. From 1858 Robertson, feeling that the life of a touring actor left no time for the serious business of writing plays, gave up acting and concentrated on writing.

Robertson's farcical sketch The Cantab, staged as an after-piece at the Strand Theatre in February 1861, attracted the attention of a Bohemian literary set, and led to his becoming a member of the Savage, Arundel and Reunion Clubs, where, in the words of his biographer Joseph Knight, "he enlarged his observation of human nature, and whence he drew some curious types". Among the up-and-coming writers with whom he mixed were F. C. Burnand, W. S. Gilbert, Tom Hood and Clement Scott. When Byron founded the magazine Fun in 1861, Robertson was a contributor from the outset. Writers for magazines and papers were seldom well paid, and to maintain a modest income Robertson wrote copiously: Pemberton lists a dozen publications to which he contributed in this period, ranging from Beeton's Englishwoman's Domestic Magazine and The Boy's Own Magazine to London Society and The Illustrated Times. Success remained elusive, and Robertson considered giving up writing and becoming a tobacconist.

=== Success ===
Edward Sothern in the title role of Robertson's David Garrick, 1864

John Hare in Robertson's Ours, 1866

An important step to success came in 1864, when Robertson wrote David Garrick, an adaptation of Mélesville's comedy Sullivan. Edward Sothern staged the piece and starred in it. The actor was at the height of his popularity, and although the notices paid more attention to his performance than to Robertson's writing, the success of the production advanced the author's career. Encouraged by this professional achievement, he wrote a new play, Society, a comedy depicting what one critic called "the efforts of an illiterate millionaire to introduce his son into 'society', and the equally vigorous efforts of 'society' to repel the intruder". This play was his breakthrough. London managements turned it down, but through Byron's influence it was produced in Liverpool, where it was a critical and popular success.

Byron was a professional associate of Marie Wilton, who had recently taken over the management of one of London's smaller theatres, the Prince of Wales's. (Note: According to a list published in 1870, the average capacity of London's 37 theatres was slightly over 1,900 seats. With a capacity of 814 the Prince of Wales's was the sixth-smallest.) At his instigation Society was presented there on 11 November 1865. In a highly favourable notice the reviewer in The Times wrote, "The piece was vehemently applauded from beginning to end. Success could not be more unequivocal". Society ran for 26 weeks – 150 performances – a notable run for the time, establishing the fortunes of the theatre, as well as those of the author. It was revived several times during the next two decades, and was given nearly 500 performances under Wilton's (later the Bancrofts') management. Between the Liverpool and London openings, Robertson suffered the loss of his wife, who died on 14 August after months of ill health.

Robertson wrote the libretto of the 1865 one-act comic opera Constance, with music by Frederic Clay. It was well reviewed when presented at Covent Garden, but ran only briefly, and Robertson did not return to the musical theatre. In 1869 Clay asked him for a second libretto, but he declined and instead gave Clay an introduction to "a better man than I shall ever be", namely Gilbert, who collaborated with Clay on the successful Ages Ago.

The success of Society established Robertson as a playwright and enabled him to have a decisive voice in the staging of his subsequent plays. His next, the comedy Ours, was first given in August 1866 at the Prince of Wales's, Liverpool, under his personal direction with a cast that included Wilton, Squire Bancroft (her future husband and partner) and John Hare. The play transferred to the Prince of Wales's in London the following month and ran for 150 performances. The Times remarked on the "ultra-real" nature of the piece and of its staging.

=== "A complete reformation of the modern drama" ===
During the run of Ours, Robertson, Gilbert, Scott and others contributed short stories to a collection edited by Tom Hood. Robertson's, "The Poor-Rate Unfolds a Tale", formed the basis for his next play at the Prince of Wales's, but before that he had two plays staged at other London theatres: Shadow-Tree Shaft, a drama, at the Princess's, and A Rapid Thaw, an adaptation of a Sardou comedy, at the St James's. (Note: A Rapid Thaw was adapted from Sardou's 1864 play Le Dégel, received dreadful reviews and closed within a week.) In April 1867 his stage version of the short story opened at the Prince of Wales's under the title Caste. In this piece Robertson developed the naturalistic, unexaggerated style for which he was becoming famous. Both as author and director he avoided the over-theatrical bombast of the early Victorian theatre. After the first night of Caste one critic wrote:

Marie Wilton as Polly Eccles in Robertson's Caste

Society and Ours prepared the way for a complete reformation of the modern drama, and until the curtain fell on Saturday night it remained a question whether Mr Robertson would be able to hold the great reputation which those pieces conferred upon him. The production of Caste has thrown aside all doubt. The reformation is complete, and Mr Robertson stands pre-eminent as the dramatist of this generation. The scene-painter, the carpenter, and the costumier no longer usurp the place of the author and actor. With the aid of only two simple scenes – a boudoir in Mayfair and a humble lodging in Lambeth – Mr Robertson has succeeded in concentrating an accumulation of incident and satire more interesting and more poignant than might be found in all the sensational dramas of the last half-century. The whole secret of his success is – truth!

Gilbert, looking back in 1901, considered Caste Robertson's masterpiece, a judgement with which analysts in the 20th and 21st centuries have concurred. The play ran for 156 performances and was revived for several further runs during the rest of the 19th century.

In 1867 Robertson remarried. His second wife was Rosetta Elizabeth Rodmill Feist (1844–1912), whom he had met at a party in London in 1866. They became engaged in August 1867, married at the British consulate in Frankfurt on 17 October, and honeymooned in Paris. They had a daughter and a son. (Note: Their children were Rosette Caroline (1869–1897) and Dion William Moritz Jacob (1871–1908).) Once back in London, Robertson continued to write and direct. In February 1868 Play was produced at the Prince of Wales's. It ran for 106 performances and was followed by a successful revival of Society. In the same year Robertson adapted Alfred de Musset's 1834 play On ne badine pas avec l'amour for his sister Madge. As Passion Flowers it was staged under Robertson's direction at the Theatre Royal, Hull, and on tour.

Robertson had written Society with Sothern in mind, but the actor had been unavailable. In late 1868 Robertson adapted Émile Augier's comedy L'Aventurière, presented at the Haymarket as Home, with Sothern in the lead role, and Ada Cavendish as Mrs Pinchbeck, in January 1869. It had a good run of 136 performances, but was outstripped by Robertson's School – loosely based on Roderich Benedix's Aschenbrödel – which opened at the Prince of Wales's in the same month and ran for 381 performances.

=== Last years ===
Robertson's last Liverpool premiere was on 22 February 1869. My Lady Clara was given at the Alexandra Theatre. The play was restaged in London on 27 March 1869 at the Gaiety Theatre, retitled Dreams. The London production featured Madge Robertson; it ran for 96 performances. Later in the same year A Breach of Promise ("An Extravagant Farce") was staged at the Globe Theatre, London, and Dublin Bay (a "comedietta") was performed at the Theatre Royal, Manchester.

Programme for Robertson's last Prince of Wales's play, 1870

In January 1870 Robertson was diagnosed as suffering from heart disease. He continued to write, and 1870 saw the production of Progress (adapted from Sardou) at the Globe, The Nightingale, a drama, at the Adelphi Theatre and his final work for the Prince of Wales's – M. P.. Robertson was an early beneficiary of improved financial terms for playwrights; the practice of payment by royalties was not widespread until the 1880s, but the management of the Prince of Wales's had paid him £1 a night for Society in 1865, and by the time of this final piece his nightly fee had risen to £5. He was also – most unusually for the period – paid for revivals. He was unable to supervise the production of M. P. or even to attend the first night. The company went to his house and gave him a private performance.

A comedy called Birth was presented by Sothern at the Theatre Royal, Bristol, followed by a provincial tour. Against medical advice Robertson attended the first night of a revival of Ours at the Prince of Wales's on 26 November. The following month he travelled to Torquay on doctor's orders, but found no improvement in his health and returned to London after two weeks. He was too ill to have any hand in the production of his last play, War, a drama staged at the St James's Theatre on 16 January 1871.

Robertson died at his home in Chalk Farm, London on 3 February 1871, aged 42. He was buried in Abney Park Cemetery. More than a thousand people attended the funeral, including the entire company of the Prince of Wales's, led by Marie Wilton, who placed a chaplet of flowers on the coffin. (Note: Among others at the graveside were Gilbert, Hood, Scott, Dion Boucicault, W. H. Kendal and Maddison Morton.) The theatre was closed that night in tribute to Robertson – an exceptional honour, according to The Times:

We cannot call to mind any precedent in this capital for so singular a compliment to a dramatic author; but, perhaps, there was never an instance of a dramatist ... being so intimately associated with the fortunes of a particular theatre as Mr Robertson was with the stage and company governed by Miss Marie Wilton".

== Plays ==
Playbill for Society, 1865

Robertson's reputation rests on his series of plays for Marie Wilton's company at the Prince of Wales's Theatre. They were seen as "problem plays", because they dealt seriously and sensitively with social issues of the day. Caste was about marriage across the class barrier and Society explored prejudice against social mobility. The plays were notable for what the critic Thomas Purnell dubbed their "cup and saucer" realism, treating contemporary British subjects in settings that were recognisable, unlike the oversized acting in Victorian melodramas that were popular at the time. The characters spoke in normal language rather than declaiming their lines. Looking back thirty years later at the original production, Bernard Shaw called Robertson's play Caste "epoch making ... After years of sham heroics and superhuman balderdash, Caste delighted everyone by its freshness, its nature, its humanity".

Shaw was mistaken in supposing everyone was delighted: some critics wrote that there was nothing in Robertson's plays but commonplace life represented without a trace of wit and sparkle, and absurdly realistic. More typical was the comment by a correspondent in The Era shortly after Robertson's death, asking who else could "successfully break, as he did, the trammels of conventionalism, and show us upon the stage living, breathing figures of flesh and blood, who walk, talk, act and think as tangible men and women really do in this work-a-day world of ours".

Some later analysts have disputed whether Robertson really originated some of the innovations attributed to him. In a 1972 study Errol Durbach suggests that "the 'revolution' had been initiated in France years before by Scribe and Sardou, those forerunners of the bourgeois domestic theatre and the well-made play". Durbach adds that in England, Vestris was staging plays "with a scrupulous concern for realistic detail", and Bulwer Lytton was already writing "the sort of play that would later be called 'Robertsonian'". Booth (2004) comments that Robertson "was neither the herald of a new drama nor the apostle of a new realism, in spite of the claims of some of his successors and of later historians. He affirmed middle-class values rather than questioned them".

Scene from Ours, 1866, showing one of Robertson's realistic stage effects – snow blowing in after the figure entering, left

Although Robertson's reputation as a revolutionary dramatist is debated, his importance in the development of modern stagecraft is generally agreed. Before him, star actors usually had control of scripts, and theatre managers had control of casting. Robertson insisted on retaining control over his scripts and casting and required that his actors follow his directions – a novel concept at that time. Dion Boucicault had been a forerunner, directing spectacular productions of his own plays, but Robertson applied the directorial precept to English domestic drama for the first time. Unlike Boucicault he did not act in his plays but applied himself exclusively to directing (or as it was called at the time "stage management") (Note: In the 19th century, the term "stage-manager" covered the artistic functions now ascribed to directors as well as the purely technical aspects of staging to which "stage-manager" has subsequently come to be restricted.) and in that capacity he could focus on ensemble and balance. Gilbert attended Robertson's rehearsals and later directed his own plays and operas based on what he had learned. He said of Robertson:

Why, he invented stage management. It was an unknown art before his time. Formerly, in a conversation scene for instance, you simply brought down two or three chairs, and people sat down and talked, and when the conversation was ended the chairs were replaced. Robertson showed how to give life and variety and nature to the scene, by breaking it up with all sorts of little incidents and delicate by-play. I have been at many of his rehearsals and learnt a great deal from them.

The actor-manager John Hare, who appeared under Robertson's direction at the Prince of Wales's, wrote:

My opinion of Robertson as a stage-manager is of the very highest. He had a gift peculiar to himself, and which I have never seen in any other author, of conveying by some rapid and almost electrical suggestion to the actor an insight into the character assigned to him. As nature was the basis of his own work, so he sought to make actors understand it should be theirs. He thus founded a school of natural acting which completely revolutionized the then existing methods, and by so doing did incalculable good to the stage.

As well as Gilbert, Hare and Shaw, leading theatrical figures who were influenced by Robertson included Arthur Wing Pinero and Harley Granville-Barker. The idealistic young playwright Tom Wrench in Pinero's Trelawny of the 'Wells' (1898) is an affectionate portrait of Robertson, of whom Pinero said, "If it hadn't been for Robertson I should never have been able to do what I have done, and that applies to the other fellows".

=== Original plays by Robertson ===
Title	Genre	Acts	Premiered at	Year
Birth	comedy	3	Theatre Royal, Bristol	1870
Breach of Promise, A	farce	2	Globe Theatre	1867
Cantab, The	farce	1	Strand Theatre	1861
Caste	comedy	3	Prince of Wales's Theatre	1867
Castles in the Air	drama	1	City Theatre	1854
Constance	comic opera (Note: Music by Frederic Clay)	1	Covent Garden	1865
Dream of Venice, A	German Reed entertainment	2	Gallery of Illustration	1867
Dreams (Note: This was at first called My Lady Clan, but on its production at the Gaiety Theatre on 27 March 1869, it was renamed Dreams.)	drama	5	Alexandra Theatre, Liverpool	1869
Dublin Bay	farce	1	Theatre Royal, Manchester	1869
For Love; Or Two Heroes	drama	3	Holborn Theatre	1867
M.P.	comedy	4	Prince of Wales's Theatre	1870
Nightingale, The	drama	5	Adelphi Theatre	1870
Night's Adventure, A	comic drama	2	Olympic Theatre	1851
Not At All Jealous	farce	1	Court Theatre	1871
Ours	comedy	3	Prince of Wales's Theatre, Liverpool	1866
Play	comedy	4	Prince of Wales's Theatre	1868
Rapid Thaw, A	comedy	2	St James's Theatre	1867
Row in the House, A (Note: Posthumously produced by the author's son T. W. Robertson the younger.)	farce	1	Toole's Theatre	1883
School (Note: Partly suggested by the German Aschenbrödl of Roderich Benedix.)	comedy	4	Prince of Wales's Theatre	1869
Shadow Tree Shaft	drama	3	Princess's Theatre	1869
Society	comedy	3	Prince of Wales's Theatre, Liverpool	1865
War	drama	3	St James's Theatre	1871

Source: T. Edgar Pemberton's edition of Society and Caste, 1905.

=== Adaptations ===
Title	Genre	Acts
Battle of Life, The	drama	3
Birds of Prey; Or a Duel in the Dark	drama	3
Chevalier de St George, The	drama	3
Clockmaker's Hat, The	farce	1
Cricket On the Hearth, The	drama	3
David Garrick	comedy	3
Duke's Daughter, The; Or the Hunchback of Paris	drama	3
Ernestine	drama	4
Faust and Marguerite	drama	3
Glass of Water, A	comedy	2
Half Caste, The; Or the Poisoned Pearl	drama	3
Haunted Man, The	drama	3
Home	comedy	3
Jocrisse the Juggler	drama	3
Ladies' Battle, The	comedy	3
Muleteer of Toledo, The	drama	4
My Wife's Diary	farce	1
Noemie	drama	2
Passion Flowers	drama	3
Peace at Any Price	farce	1
Progress	comedy	3
Robinson Crusoe	burlesque	1
Ruy Blas	drama	3
Sea of Ice, The; Or the Prayer of the Wrecked and the Gold Seekers of Mexico	drama	5
Star of the North, The	drama	5
Two Gay Deceivers; or, Black, White and Grey (Note: In collaboration with T. H. Lacy)	farce	1

Source: Pemberton.

=== Unperformed ===
Title	Genre	Acts
Down in Our Village	comedy drama	2
Over the Way,	comedietta	1
Photographs and Ices	farce	1
Post Haste	comedy	3
Which Is It?	comedy	2

Source: Pemberton.

== Notes, references and sources ==
=== Sources ===
- Archer, William (1904). Real Conversations. London: Heinemann. OCLC 669763568.
- Hamilton, Clayton (1917). The Social Plays of Arthur Wing Pinero. New York: Dutton. OCLC 157236101.
- Pemberton, T. Edgar (1893). The Life and Writings of T. W. Robertson. London: R. Bentley and Son. OCLC 1048298589.
- Pemberton, T. Edgar (1905). Society and Caste. Boston and London: D. C. Heath. OCLC 492931290.
- Robertson, Thomas William Shafto (1889). The Principal Dramatic Works of Thomas William Robertson. London: Samuel French. OCLC 9315106.
- Rowell, George (1978). The Victorian Theatre 1792–1914 (second ed.). Cambridge: Cambridge University Press. ISBN 978-0-521-22070-5.
- Savin, Maynard (1950). Thomas William Robertson: His Plays and Stagecraft. Providence, Rhode Island: Brown University Press. OCLC 1031745352.
- Shaw, Bernard (1922). Dramatic Opinions and Essays. New York: Brentano's. OCLC 40138182.
- Thorndike, Ashley (1965) [1929]. English Comedy. New York: Cooper Square. OCLC 432990136.
- Tydeman, William (1982). Plays by Tom Robertson. Cambridge and New York: Cambridge University Press. OCLC 1150933010.
