= Henry James Byron =

English dramatist and editor (1835–1884)

Byron in the 1870s

Henry James Byron (8 January 1835 – 11 April 1884) was an English dramatist, writing more than 150 dramatic pieces, as well as an editor, director, theatre manager, novelist and actor.

After an abortive start at a medical career, Byron struggled as a provincial actor and aspiring playwright in the 1850s. Returning to London and beginning to study for the bar, he finally found playwriting success in burlesques and other punny plays. In the 1860s, he became an editor of humorous magazines and a noted man-about-town, while continuing to build his playwriting reputation, notably as co-manager, with Marie Wilton, of the Prince of Wales's Theatre. In 1869, he returned to the stage as an actor and, during the same period, wrote numerous plays, including the record-setting international success, Our Boys. In his last years, he grew frail from tuberculosis and died at the age of 49.

== Biography ==
Byron was born in Manchester, England, the son of Henry Byron (1804–1884, second cousin to the poet Lord Byron and descendant of many Lords Byron), at one time British consul in Port-au-Prince, Haiti, and Elizabeth Josephine née Bradley. He was educated in Essex and then at St. Peter's Collegiate School in Eaton Square, London. Although his mother wanted him to pursue a career in the Navy, Byron did not do so. Instead, he first became a physician's clerk in London for four years and then studied medicine with his grandfather, Dr. James Byron Bradley, in Buxton. Byron married Martha Foulkes (1831–1876) in London in 1856. He entered the Middle Temple as a student briefly in 1858, but he had already begun writing for the stage and soon returned to that vocation.

=== Early career ===
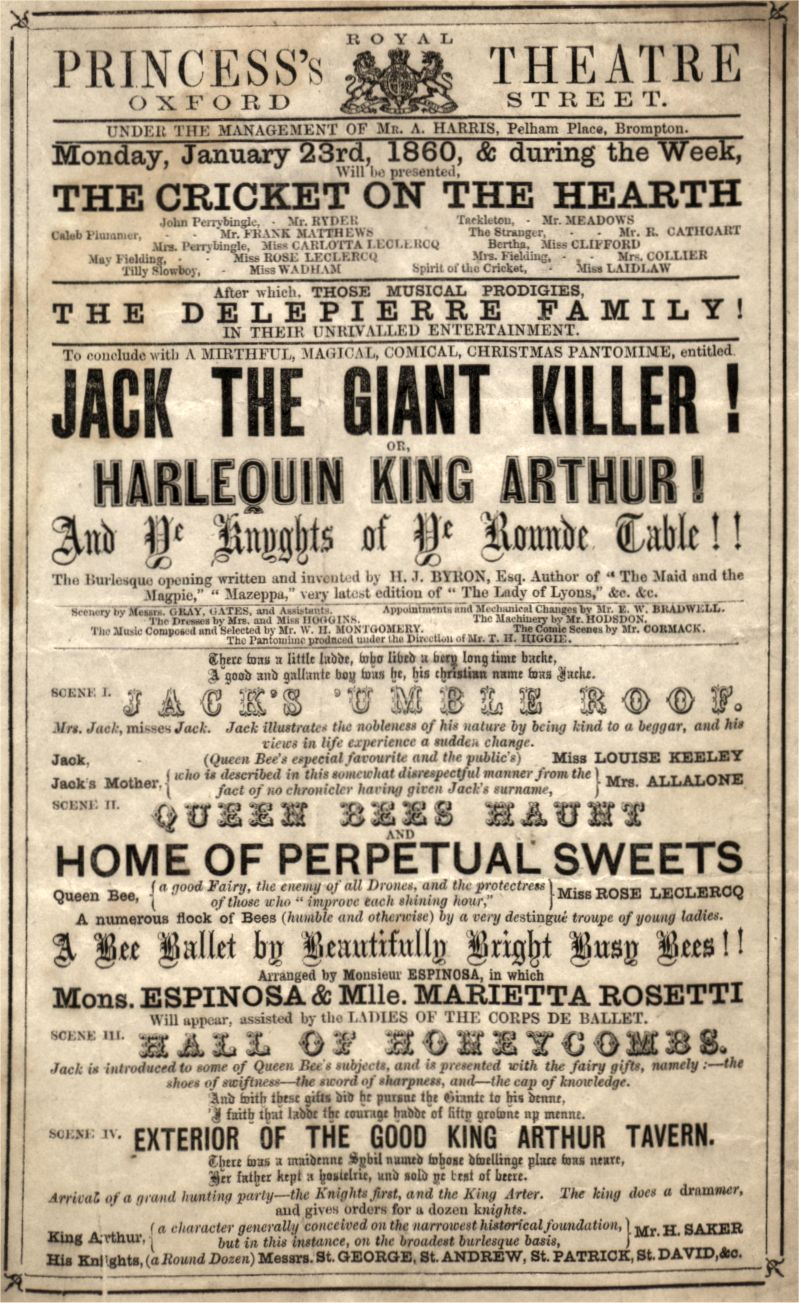
Poster for Byron's 1859–60 pantomime, Jack the Giant Killer

Byron joined several provincial companies as an actor from 1853–57, sometimes in his own plays and sometimes in those of T. W. Robertson (with whom he acted and starved) or others, but had little success. He described his early attempts at acting, and the hardships of the journeyman touring actor, in an 1873 essay for The Era Almanack and Annual called "Eighteen Parts a Week". He began writing burlesques of melodramas and extravaganzas in the mid-1850s. In 1857, his burlesque of Richard of the Lion Heart premièred at the Royal Strand Theatre. His successful works in 1858 included The Lady of Lyons, or, Twopenny Pride and Pennytence and Fra Diavolo Travestie; or, The Prince, the Pirate and the Pearl, also at the Strand, which later played in New York. This was so well received that Byron abandoned the law to concentrate full-time on theatre. Another successful Strand burlesque in 1858 was The Maid and the Magpie; or, The Fatal Spoon an early play to include a dance at the end of a song. This starred Marie Wilton as Pippo and was also revived in New York. In 1859, he wrote another successful burlesque, The Babes in the Wood and the Good Little Fairy Birds. He soon wrote other burlesques for the Strand, the Olympic Theatre, and the Adelphi Theatre, as well as a sequence of Christmas pantomimes for the Princess's Theatre, beginning in 1859 with Jack the Giant Killer, or, Harlequin, King Arthur, and ye Knights of ye Round Table and followed the next year by Robinson Crusoe, or Harlequin Friday and the King of the Caribee Islands!

Byron also wrote for periodicals, and in 1861, he became the first editor of Fun magazine, where he showcased the comic talents of the then-unknown W. S. Gilbert. He became editor of Comic News in 1863. He also founded the short-lived Comic Trials and wrote a three-volume novel, Paid in Full, in 1865. In 1867, he became the editor of Wag, another humour magazine, and in 1877, the sixpenny magazine Mirth. He wrote numerous dramatic critiques and humorous essays for magazines, including the rival of Fun, Punch. During this period, he was a well-known man-about-town, joining, and popular as a guest at, various London dining clubs and, in 1863, becoming a founding member of the Arundel Club. Henry Morley acknowledged with dismay Byron's position in the literary world as chief punster but found in him "a true power of fun that makes itself felt by high and low". He became a Member of the Dramatic Authors' Society by 1860.

At the same time, he continued writing for the Strand, the Adelphi, the Theatre Royal, Drury Lane, the Haymarket Theatre and the Princess's, among other London theatres. Among Byron's dozens of plays in the early 1860s, his early successes were mostly burlesques, such as Bluebeard from a New Point of Hue (1860); Cinderella (1860); Aladdin, or, The Wonderful Scamp (1861); and Esmeralda, or, The Sensation Goat (1861), all in rhymed couplets. Another success was George de Barnwell; or Harlequin Folly in the Realms of Fancy (1862). Several of these early plays were revived in Britain and received New York productions.

1868 production of Dearer Than Life showing seated l. to r. Toole, Lionel Brough and Irving

Between 1865 and 1867, he joined Marie Wilton, whom he had met through his early work at the Strand, in the management of the Prince of Wales's Theatre. She provided the capital, and he was to write the plays. His first was a burlesque of La sonnambula. However, Wilton wanted to present more sophisticated pieces. She agreed to produce three more burlesques by Byron, but he agreed to write his first prose comedies, War to the Knife (a success in 1865) and A Hundred Thousand Pounds (1866). They also staged one of T. W. Robertson's biggest successes, Society, in 1865. Upon his severing the partnership and starting theatre management on his own account in the provinces, he lost money, ending up in bankruptcy court in 1868. However, he produced many of his plays at these theatres while continuing to write for London theatres. One successful provincial work was Dearer than Life (1867), which received many revivals, beginning with a London revival in 1868 starring J. L. Toole and the young Henry Irving. Another, the same year, was The Lancashire Lass; or, Tempted, Tried and True (1867), a melodrama, also revived in London in 1868. He even collaborated with W. S. Gilbert on Robinson Crusoe; or, The Injun Bride and the Injured Wife, which played in 1867 at the Haymarket Theatre in London.

=== Return to acting and later years ===
He returned to acting, making his London acting début, in 1869, achieving much greater success than in his early attempts, as Sir Simon Simple in his comedy Not Such a Fool as He Looks. He followed this with successful outings as Fitzaltamont in The Prompter's Box: A Story of the Footlights and the Fireside (1870), The Prompter's Box (1870, revived in 1875 and often thereafter, and later renamed The Crushed Tragedian), Captain Craven in Daisy Farm (1871) and Lionel Leveret in Old Soldiers (1873). Byron's acting was again admired in An American Lady in 1874, with which he began as the manager of the Criterion Theatre, and then Married in Haste (1875) which was much revived. In 1876, he played in his The Bull by the Horns and Old Chums. Other roles included Dick Simpson in Conscience Money (1878), Charles Chuckles in his An English Gentleman (1879) and John Blunt in his Michael Strogoff (1881). In 1881, he played the role of Cheviot Hill in a revival of his friend Gilbert's eccentric comedy, Engaged. He continued acting until 1882, when ill health forced him to retire. Not surprisingly, Byron achieved his greatest acting successes in timing of the delivery of his own witty lines. The Times explained that "in such parts as Gibson Greene in Married in Haste, a self-possessed, observant, satirical, well-bred man of the world, [Byron] was beyond the reach of rivalry. To ease and grace of manner he united a peculiar aptitude for the delivery of the good things he put into his own mouth."

Our Boys, 1875

Byron continued to write prose comedies with the ambitious semi-autobiographical Cyril's Success (1868), The Upper Crust (starring Toole), Uncle Dick's Darling (1870, starring Henry Irving), An English Gentleman (1871, starring Edward Sothern), Weak Woman (1875, starring Marion Terry), and his greatest success, Our Boys (1875–79, Vaudeville Theatre). With 1,362 performances in its original production, Our Boys set the record for the longest-running play in history and held it for almost two decades. It was also much revived, especially in America.

From 1876 to 1879, he wrote several successful burlesques for the Gaiety Theatre, London, such as a burlesque of Dion Boucicault's Don Caesar de Bazan called Little Don Caesar de Bazan, and The Gaiety Gulliver (1879). Also during that period, he edited the humour magazine Mirth. In 1878, he co-wrote a highly successful charity pantomime, The Forty Thieves, together with Robert Reece, W. S. Gilbert and F. C. Burnand. In 1880, four volumes of his plays were published, with fourteen plays in each book. After 1880, as his health greatly declined, so did Byron's playwriting output. The popular three-act comedy The Guv'nor, credited to "E. G. Lankester" and first performed in the 1880s, has been attributed to Byron on stylistic grounds.

Byron is described by Jim Davis in the introduction to his 1984 collection, Plays by H. J. Byron, as the most prolific playwright of the mid-Victorian period, as he produced over 150 dramatic pieces. The Times called Byron a master of "genial wit and humour". It also commented that "The secret of his success... lay chiefly in his dialogue, which is seldom otherwise than neat, pointed and amusing. He fires verbal shots in such rapid succession that one laugh has scarcely died away when another is raised. In the delineation of character, too, he is often extremely happy".

By 1874, he was showing symptoms of tuberculosis, which caused his retirement in 1882. His first wife died in 1876 at the age of 45, and the same year he remarried Eleanor Mary née Joy, the daughter of Edward Joy, a lawyer. His son Henry and daughter Crede (a pun on Crede Byron, the Byron family motto) also became actors, and he had another son.

During the last few years of his life Byron was in frail health, and he died at his home in Clapham, London, England, in 1884 at the age of 49. He is buried in Brompton Cemetery, London.
