= Erethism =

Neurological disorder caused by mercury poisoning

Mercury poisoning, chronic (neurological symptomatology)
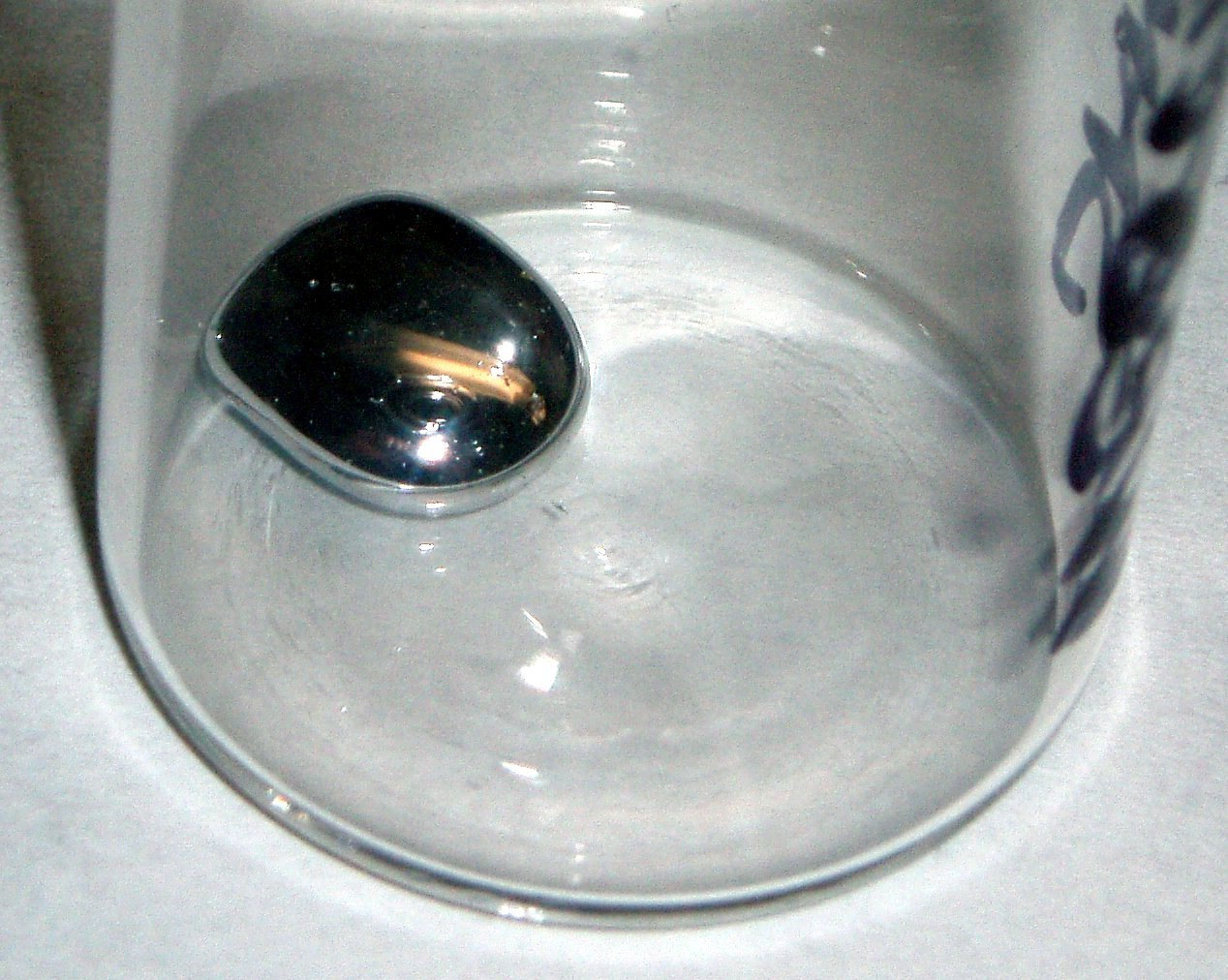
- Elemental mercury
- Specialty: Emergency medicine

Erethism, (Note: From Greek ἐρεθισμός erethismos "irritation".) also known as erethismus mercurialis, mad hatter disease, or mad hatter syndrome, is a neurological disorder which affects the whole central nervous system, as well as a symptom complex, derived from mercury poisoning. Erethism is characterized by behavioral changes such as irritability, low self-confidence, depression, apathy, shyness and timidity, and in some extreme cases with prolonged exposure to mercury vapors, by delirium, personality changes and memory loss. People with erethism often have difficulty with social interactions. Associated physical problems may include a decrease in physical strength, headaches, general pain, and tremors, as well as an irregular heartbeat.

Mercury is an element that is found worldwide in soil, rocks, and water. People who get erethism are often exposed to mercury through their jobs. Some of the higher risk jobs that can lead to occupational exposure of workers to mercury are working in a chlor-alkali, thermometer, glassblowing, or fluorescent light bulb factory, and working in construction, dental clinics, or in gold and silver mines. In factories, workers are exposed to mercury primarily through the base products and processes involved in making the final end consumer product. In dental clinics it is primarily through their interaction and installation of dental amalgams to treat dental caries. In the case of mining, mercury is used in the process to purify and completely extract the precious metals.

Some elemental and chemical forms of mercury (vapor, methylmercury, inorganic mercury) are more toxic than other forms. The human fetus and medically compromised people (for example, patients with lung or kidney problems) are the most susceptible to the toxic effects of mercury.

Mercury poisoning can also occur outside of occupational exposures including in the home. Inhalation of mercury vapor may stem from cultural and religious rituals where mercury is sprinkled on the floor of a home or car, burned in a candle, or mixed with perfume. Due to widespread use and popular concern, the risk of toxicity from dental amalgam has been exhaustively investigated. It has conclusively been shown to be safe although in 2020 the FDA issued new guidance for at-risk populations who should avoid mercury amalgam.

Historically, this was common among felt hat makers in England, who were exposed to mercury vapours they used when stabilising wool during the felting process. The industrial workers were exposed to the mercury vapours, giving rise to the expression "mad as a hatter". Some believe that the character the Mad Hatter in Lewis Carroll's Alice in Wonderland is an example of someone with erethism, but the origin of this account is unclear. The character was almost certainly based on Theophilus Carter, an eccentric furniture dealer who was well known to Carroll.

== Signs and symptoms ==
Acute mercury exposure has given rise to psychotic reactions such as delirium, hallucinations, and suicidal tendencies. Occupational exposure has resulted in erethism, with irritability, excitability, excessive shyness, and insomnia as the principal features of a broad-ranging functional disturbance. With continuing exposure, a fine tremor develops, initially involving the hands and later spreading to the eyelids, lips, and tongue, causing violent muscular spasms in the most severe cases. The tremor is reflected in the handwriting which has a characteristic appearance. In milder cases, erethism and tremor regress slowly over a period of years following removal from exposure. Decreased nerve conduction velocity in mercury-exposed workers has been demonstrated. Long-term, low-level exposure has been found to be associated with less pronounced symptoms of erethism, characterized by fatigue, irritability, loss of memory, vivid dreams, and depression (WHO, 1976).

The man affected is easily upset and embarrassed, loses all joy in life and lives in constant fear of being dismissed from his job. He has a sense of timidity and may lose self control before visitors. Thus, if one stops to watch such a man in a factory, he will sometimes throw down his tools and turn in anger on the intruder, saying he cannot work if watched. Occasionally a man is obliged to give up work because he can no longer take orders without losing his temper or, if he is a foreman, because he has no patience with men under him. Drowsiness, depression, loss of memory and insomnia may occur, but hallucinations, delusions and mania are rare.
The most characteristic symptom, though it is seldom the first to appear, is mercurial tremor. It is neither as fine nor as regular as that of hyperthyroidism. It may be interrupted every few minutes by coarse jerky movements. It usually begins in the fingers, but the eyelids, lips and tongue are affected early. As it progresses it passes to the arms and legs, so that it becomes very difficult for a man to walk about the workshop, and he may have to be guided to his bench. At this stage the condition is so obvious that it is known to the layman as "hatter's shakes."

— Buckell et al., Chronic Mercury Poisoning (1946)

Effects of chronic occupational exposure to mercury, such as that commonly experienced by affected hatters, include mental confusion, emotional disturbances, and muscular weakness. Severe neurological damage and kidney damage can also occur. Signs and symptoms can include red fingers, red toes, red cheeks, sweating, loss of hearing, bleeding from the ears and mouth, loss of appendages such as teeth, hair, and nails, lack of coordination, poor memory, shyness, insomnia, nervousness, tremors, and dizziness. A survey of exposed U.S. hatters revealed predominantly neurological symptomatology, including intention tremor. After chronic exposure to the mercury vapours, hatters tended to develop characteristic psychological traits, such as pathological shyness and marked irritability (see box). Such manifestations among hatters prompted several popular names for erethism, including "mad hatter disease", "mad hatter syndrome", "hatter's shakes" and "Danbury shakes".

== Biomarkers of exposure ==
While hatters in the past were diagnosed with erethism through their symptoms, it was sometimes harder to prove that erethism was the result of mercury exposure, as seen in the case of the hatters of New Jersey below. Today, although erethism from the hat making industry is no longer an issue, it persists in other high-risk occupations. As a result, methods have been established to measure the mercury exposure of workers more accurately. They include the collection and testing of mercury levels in blood, hair, nails, and urine. Most of these biomarkers have a shorter half-life for mercury (e.g. in blood the half-life is usually only around 2–4 days), which makes some of them better for testing acute, high doses of mercury exposure. However, mercury in urine has a much longer half-life (measured in weeks to months), and unlike the other biomarkers is more representative of the total body burden of inorganic and elemental mercury. This makes it the ideal biomarker for measuring occupational exposure to mercury because it is suitable to measuring low, chronic exposure, and specifically exposure to inorganic and elemental mercury (i.e. mercury vapor), which are the two types most likely to be encountered in a higher risk occupation.

== History among hatters ==
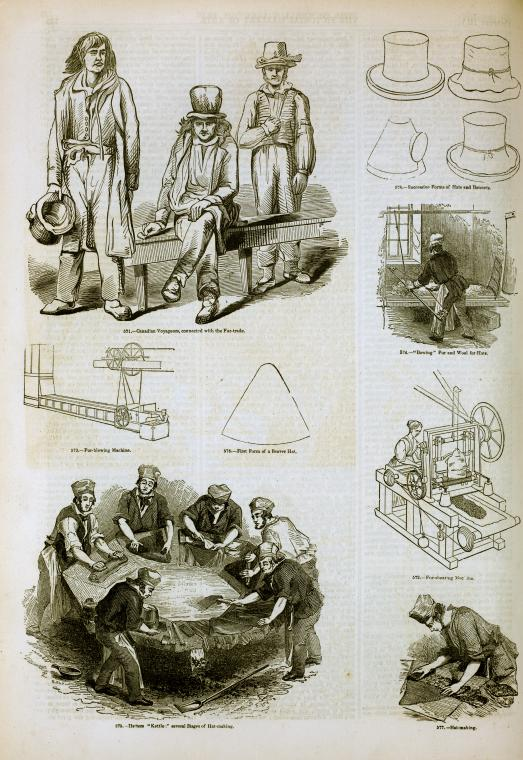
Some of the steps in the manufacture of felt hats are illustrated in this image from 1858.

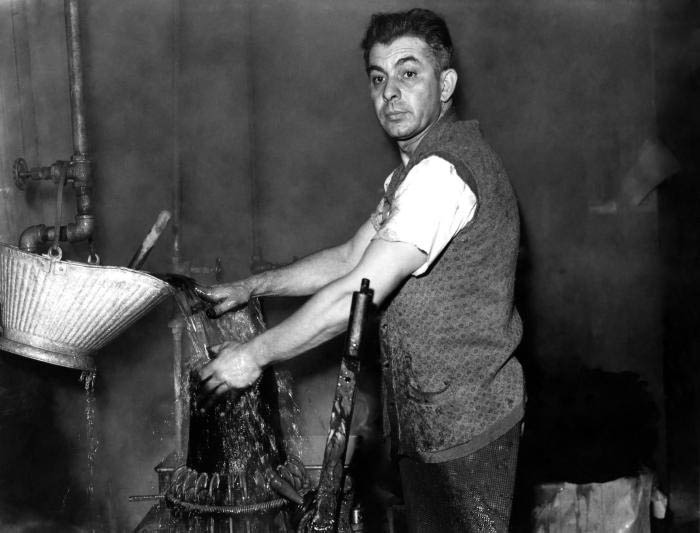
A man working in hat manufacture with no protective equipment, putting him at risk for mercury poisoning

Especially in the 19th century, inorganic mercury in the form of mercuric nitrate was commonly used in the production of felt for hats. During the carroting process in which furs from small animals such as rabbits, hares or beavers were separated from their skins and matted together, an orange-colored solution containing mercuric nitrate was used as a smoothing agent. The resulting felt was then repeatedly shaped into large cones, shrunk in boiling water and dried. In treated felts, a slow reaction released volatile free mercury. Hatters (or milliners) who came into contact with vapours from the impregnated felt often worked in confined areas.

Use of mercury in hatmaking is thought to have been adopted by the Huguenots in 17th-century France, at a time when the dangers of mercury exposure were already known. This process was initially kept a trade secret in France, where hatmaking rapidly became a hazardous occupation. At the end of the 17th century the Huguenots carried the secret to England, following the revocation of the Edict of Nantes. During the Victorian era the hatters' malaise became proverbial, as reflected in popular expressions like "mad as a hatter" (see below) and "the hatters' shakes".

The first description of symptoms of mercury poisoning among hatters appears to have been made in St Petersburg, Russia, in 1829. In the United States, a thorough occupational description of mercury poisoning among New Jersey hatters was published locally by Addison Freeman in 1860. Adolph Kussmaul's definitive clinical description of mercury poisoning published in 1861 contained only passing references to hatmakers, including a case originally reported in 1845 of a 15-year-old Parisian girl, the severity of whose tremors following two years of carroting prompted opium treatment. In Britain, the toxicologist Alfred Swaine Taylor reported the disease in a hatmaker in 1864.

In 1869, the French Academy of Medicine demonstrated the health hazards posed to hatmakers. Alternatives to mercury use in hatmaking became available by 1874. In the United States, a hydrochloride-based process was patented in 1888 to obviate the use of mercury, but was ignored.

In 1898, legislation was passed in France to protect hatmakers from the risks of mercury exposure. By the turn of the 20th century, mercury poisoning among British hatters had become a rarity.

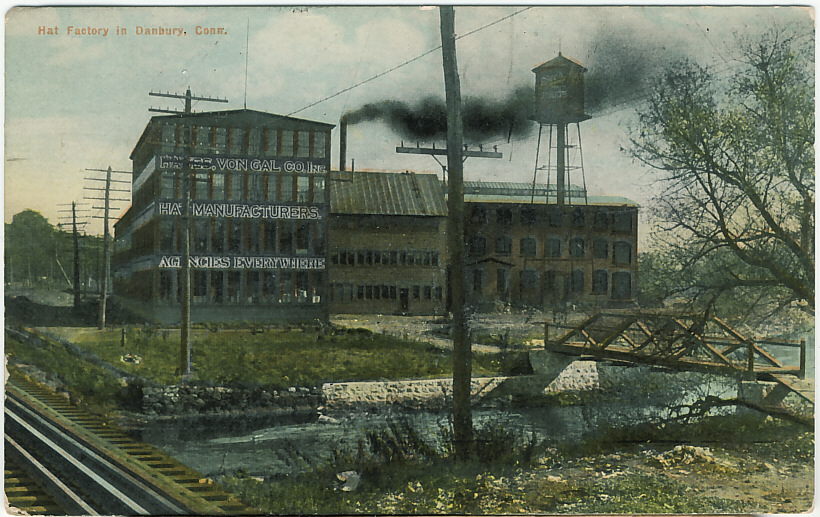
Picture postcard of a hat factory in Danbury (postmarked 1911)

In the United States, the mercury-based process continued to be adopted until as late as 1941, when it was abandoned mainly due to the wartime need for the heavy metal in the manufacture of detonators. Thus, for much of the 20th century mercury poisoning remained common in the U.S. hatmaking industries, including those located in Danbury, Connecticut (giving rise to the expression the "Danbury shakes").

Another 20th-century cohort of affected hatmakers has been studied in Tuscany, Italy.

=== Hatters of New Jersey ===
The experience of hatmakers in New Jersey is well documented and has been reviewed by Richard Wedeen. In 1860, at a time when the hatmaking industry in towns such as Newark, Orange and Bloomfield was growing rapidly, a physician from Orange called J. Addison Freeman published an article titled "Mercurial Disease Among Hatters" in the Transactions of the Medical Society of New Jersey. This groundbreaking paper provided a clinical account of the effects of chronic mercury poisoning among the workforce, coupled with an occupational description of the use of mercuric nitrate during carroting and inhalation of mercury vapour later in the process (during finishing, forming and sizing). Freeman concluded that "A proper regard for the health of this class of citizens demands that mercury should not be used so extensively in the manufacture of hats, and that if its use is essential, that the hat finishers' room should be large, with a high ceiling, and well ventilated." Freeman's call for prevention went unheeded.

In 1878, an inspection of 25 firms around Newark conducted by Dr L. Dennis on behalf of the Essex County Medical Society revealed "mercurial disease" in 25% of 1,589 hatters. Dennis recognized that this prevalence figure was probably an underestimate, given the workers' fear of being fired if they admitted to being diseased. Although Dennis did recommend the use of fans in the workplace he attributed most of the hatters' health problems to excessive alcohol use (thus using the stigma of drunkenness in a mainly immigrant workforce to justify the unsanitary working conditions provided by employers).

The surprise is that men can be induced to work at all in such death producing enclosures. It is hard to believe that men of ordinary intelligence could be so indifferent to the ordinary laws of health... It does not seem to have occurred to them that all the efforts to keep up wages... [are] largely offset by the impairment of their health, due to neglect of proper hygienic regulations of their workshops... And when the fact of the workmen in the sizing room, who stand in water, was mentioned, and the simple and inexpensive means by which it could be largely avoided was spoken of, the reply was that it would cost money and hat manufacturers did not care to expend money for such purposes, if they could avoid it.

— Bishop, Annual Report of the Bureau of Statistics of Labor and Industries of New Jersey (1890)

Some voluntary reductions in mercury exposure were implemented after Lawrence T. Fell, a former journeyman hatter from Orange who had become a successful manufacturer, was appointed Inspector of Factories in 1883. In the late nineteenth century, a pressing health issue among hatters was tuberculosis. This deadly communicable disease was rife in the extremely unhygienic wet and steamy enclosed spaces in which the hatters were expected to work (in its annual report for 1889, the New Jersey Bureau of Labor and Industries expressed incredulity at the conditions—see box). Two-thirds of the recorded deaths of hatters in Newark and Orange between 1873 and 1876 were caused by pulmonary disease, most often in men under 30 years of age, and elevated death rates from tuberculosis persisted into the twentieth century. Consequently, public health campaigns to prevent tuberculosis spreading from the hatters into the wider community tended to eclipse the issue of mercury poisoning. For instance, in 1886 J. W. Stickler, working on behalf of the New Jersey Board of Health, promoted prevention of tuberculosis among hatters, but deemed mercurialism "uncommon", despite having reported tremors in 15–50% of the workers he had surveyed.

While hatters seemed to regard the shakes as an inevitable price to pay for their work rather than a readily preventable disease, their employers professed ignorance of the problem. In a 1901 survey of 11 employers of over a thousand hatters in Newark and Orange, the head of the Bureau of Statistics of New Jersey, William Stainsby, found a lack of awareness of any disease peculiar to hatters apart from tuberculosis and rheumatism (though one employer remarked that "work at the trade develops an inordinate craving for strong drink").

By 1934, the U.S. Public Health Service estimated that 80% of American felt makers had mercurial tremors. Nevertheless, trade union campaigns (led by the United States Hat Finishers Association, originally formed in 1854) never addressed the issue and, unlike in France, no relevant legislation was ever adopted in the United States. Instead, it seems to have been the need for mercury in the war effort that eventually brought to an end the use of mercuric nitrate in U.S. hatmaking; in a meeting convened by the U.S. Public Health Service in 1941, the manufacturers voluntarily agreed to adopt a readily available alternative process using hydrogen peroxide.

=== "Mad as a hatter" ===
While the name of Lewis Carroll's Mad Hatter may contain an allusion to the hatters' syndrome, the character itself appears to have been based on an eccentric furniture dealer.

Although the expression "mad as a hatter" was associated with the syndrome, the origin of the phrase is uncertain.

Lewis Carroll's iconic Mad Hatter character in Alice's Adventures in Wonderland displays markedly eccentric behavior, which includes taking a bite out of a teacup. Carroll would have been familiar with the phenomenon of dementia among hatters, but the literary character is thought to be directly inspired by Theophilus Carter, an eccentric furniture dealer who did not show signs of mercury poisoning.

The actor Johnny Depp has said of his portrayal of a carrot-orange haired Mad Hatter in Tim Burton's 2010 film, Alice in Wonderland that the character "was poisoned ... and it was coming out through his hair, through his fingernails and eyes".

== See also ==
- Danbury Hatters' case
- Minamata disease

== Sources ==
- Wedeen, Richard P. (1989). "Were the hatters of new jersey 'mad'?". American Journal of Industrial Medicine. 16 (2): 225–233. doi:10.1002/ajim.4700160213. PMID 2672802.
