= Mad as a hatter =

Lighthearted English colloquialism on the topic of insanity and mercury poisoning

The Mad Hatter, illustration by John Tenniel, 1865

"Mad as a hatter" is a colloquial English phrase used in conversation to suggest (lightheartedly) that a person is suffering from insanity. The etymology of the phrase is uncertain, with explanations both connected and unconnected to the trade of hatmaking. The earliest known appearance of the phrase in print is in an 1829 issue of Blackwood's Edinburgh Magazine, predating the Mad Hatter from Lewis Carroll's Alice's Adventures in Wonderland by several decades.

== Etymology ==
There are many theories about the possible origin of the saying:

- Mercury poisoning of hatmakers – In 18th- and 19th-century England, mercury was used in the production of felt, which was commonly used in the hat-making trade at the time. Long-term use of mercury products often resulted in mercury poisoning-induced erethism among hat-makers. In the late 19th-century United States, a notable example occurred in Danbury, Connecticut, where hatmaking was a major industry. Instances of erethism were so widespread among hatmakers, the condition became known locally as the "Danbury Shakes." It was characterized by slurred speech, tremors, stumbling, and, in extreme cases, hallucinations.
- An incident of nominalization of the verb hatter, which means "To harass; to weary; to wear out with fatigue," according to Samuel Johnson's A Dictionary of the English Language, published in 1755. In the text, he cites a passage from the work of John Dryden as an example of usage: "He's hatter'd out with pennance."
- Roger Crab, a 17th-century hermit who has been suggested as the inspiration for Carroll's Mad Hatter. After working for a short time as a hatter, Crab gave all his goods to the poor and wore homemade sackcloth clothes. However, this was presaged by political and religious radicalism and was followed by a long married life.
- An adaptation of the Old English word atter meaning "poison", or of the unrelated word adder in reference to the venomous crossed viper. Lexicographers William and Mary Morris in Morris Dictionary of Word and Phrase Origins (1977) favour this derivation because "mad as a hatter" was known before hat making was a recognized trade. According to A Dictionary of Common Fallacies (1980), "'mad' meant 'venomous' and 'hatter' is a corruption of 'adder' or viper, so that the phrase 'mad as an atter' originally meant 'as venomous as a viper'."

== Historical significance ==
Boston Corbett, who shot Abraham Lincoln's assassin John Wilkes Booth, spent his early life as a hat maker. It is believed that the effects of his early life job affected his decision-making for his future. He was considered "mad as a hatter" for going against orders when his unit had Booth surrounded in a barn in Virginia, and Sergeant Corbett shot Booth instead of taking him alive. After investigation, Sergeant Corbett was forgiven for his disobedience, but left the Army and went back to hat making. After a few years, Corbett suffered further mental illness, and he was thrown into an insane asylum. Corbett managed to escape, and he was never seen again.

== Early uses ==
In a section of Volume 25 of Blackwood's Edinburgh Magazine, headed Noctes Ambrocianæ. No. XLIV, there is a conversation between a group of fictional characters:

NORTH: Many years – I was Sultan of Bello for a long period, until dethroned by an act of the grossest injustice; but I intend to expose the traitorous conspirators to the indignation of an outraged world.

TICKLER (aside to SHEPHERD.): He's raving.
SHEPHERD (to TICKLER.): Dementit.

ODOHERTY (to both.): Mad as a hatter. Hand me a segar.

Canadian author Thomas Chandler Haliburton misused the phrase twice in his 1835 book (though it may have been an accepted colloquial use) The clockmaker; or the sayings and doings of Samuel Slick of Slickville: "And with that he turned right round, and sat down to his map and never said another word, lookin' as mad as a hatter the whole blessed time" and "Father he larfed out like any thing; I thought he would never stop – and sister Sall got right up and walked out of the room, as mad as a hatter. Says she, Sam, I do believe you are a born fool, I vow."

== See also ==
- The dictionary definition of mad as a hatter at Wiktionary
- Mad as a March hare
- Going postal
