= Twinkle, Twinkle, Little Bat =

1865 verse by Lewis Carroll

The Mad Hatter reciting, with the Dormouse next to him, as illustrated by John Tenniel

"Twinkle, Twinkle, Little Bat" is a verse recited by the Mad Hatter in chapter seven of Lewis Carroll's 1865 novel Alice's Adventures in Wonderland. It is a parody of "Twinkle Twinkle Little Star".

== Text ==
Twinkle, twinkle, little bat!
How I wonder what you're at!
Up above the world you fly,
Like a tea tray in the sky.

== Context ==
The Hatter is interrupted in his recitation by the Dormouse. "The Bat" was the nickname of Professor Bartholomew Price, one of the Dons at Oxford, a former teacher of Carroll's and well known to Alice Liddell's family.
