= Canción de Alicia en el país =

"Canción de Alicia en el país" is a protest song by Charly García, recorded by the Argentine rock group Serú Girán and included on the album Bicicleta in 1980.

The song refers to the last military dictatorship in Argentina, originally composed for a film, then reformed with the intention of reflecting the reality experienced in the 1970s. The author tried to prevent his song from being censored by the government by drawing metaphors with the novel Alice in Wonderland (1865) by Lewis Carroll. The song reached number one in a number of Latin American countries, including Argentina, Brazil, Colombia and Uruguay.

== History ==
In 1976, visual artist Eduardo Plá premiered his first and only feature film: "Alice in Wonderland." To compose the film's song, he contacted Charly García in 1973. According to the film's credits, "Alice in Wonderland Song" was, at that time, simply titled "Alice," and during the transition of the author's name from Carlos Alberto to Charly, he was still in the stage where he was known as "Charlie."

This first version of “Canción de Alicia en el país” (Alice's Song in Wonderland) has another unique feature: it is not sung by Charly. Although his name is not written anywhere in the film, the song is performed by Raúl Porchetto, a friend of Charly García.

== Credits ==
- Charly García: piano and vocals.
- David Lebón : guitar and backing vocals
- Pedro Aznar : electric bass, keyboards and backing vocals.
- Oscar Moro : drums and percussion.
