= 'Tis the Voice of the Lobster =

1865 poem by Lewis Carroll

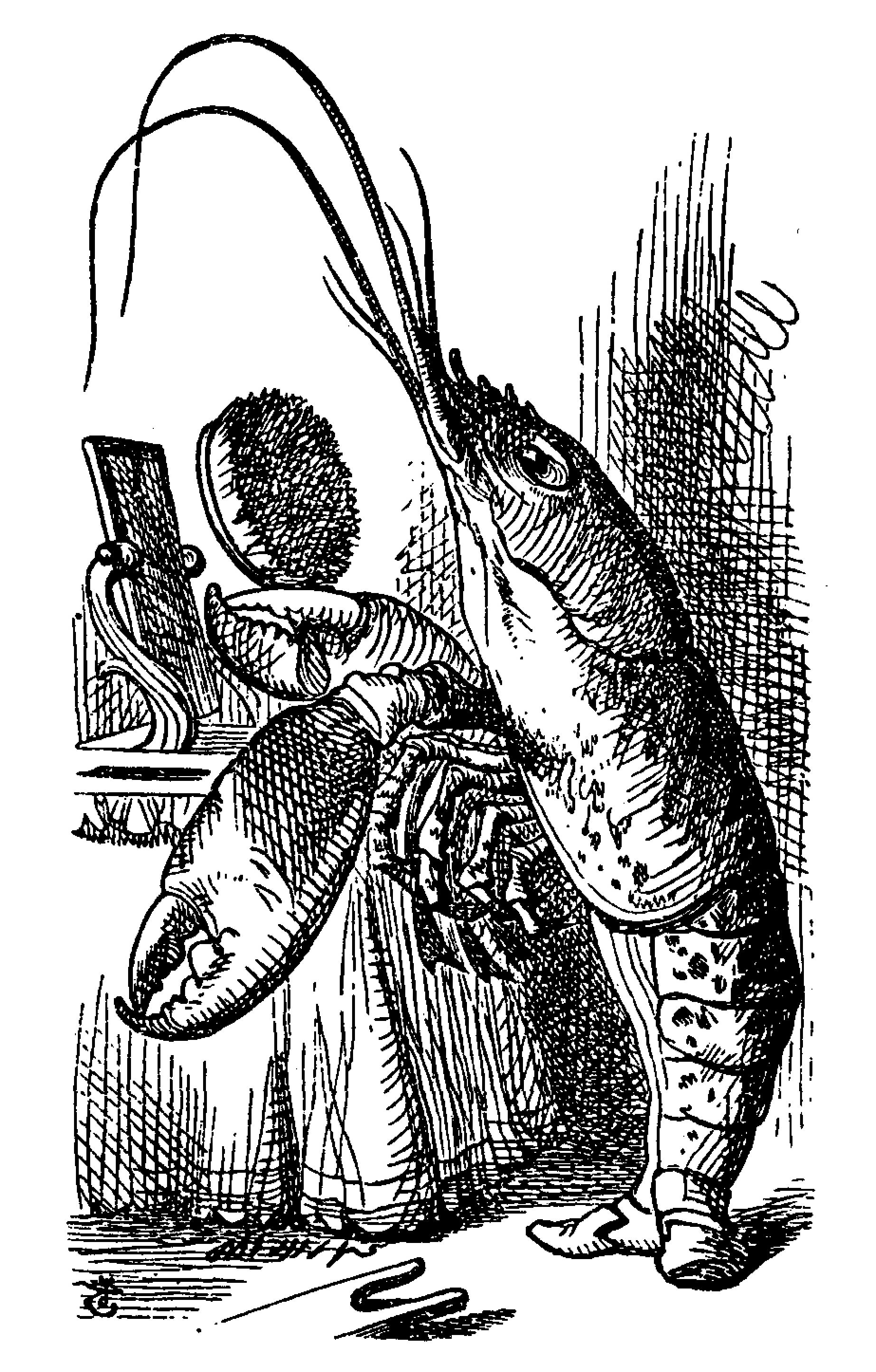
The Lobster, illustrated by John Tenniel

"'Tis the Voice of the Lobster" is a poem by Lewis Carroll that appears in Chapter 10 of his 1865 novel Alice's Adventures in Wonderland. It is recited by Alice to the Mock Turtle and the Gryphon.

== Analysis ==
"'Tis the Voice of the Lobster" is a parody of "The Sluggard", a moralistic poem by Isaac Watts which was well known in Carroll's day. "The Sluggard" depicts the unsavory lifestyle of a slothful individual as a negative example. Carroll's lobster's corresponding vice is that he is weak and cannot back up his boasts, and is consequently easy prey. This fits the pattern of the predatory parody poems in the two Alice books.

== Text ==
=== Published version ===
As published in Alice's Adventures in Wonderland (1867):

[After the Gryphon and the Mock Turtle have sung and danced to the Lobster Quadrille, Alice mentions the poems she has attempted to recite, and the Gryphon tells Alice to stand and recite "'Tis the voice of the sluggard", which she reluctantly does] "but her head was so full of the Lobster Quadrille, that she hardly knew what she was saying ..."

'Tis the voice of the lobster; I heard him declare,
"You have baked me too brown, I must sugar my hair."
As a duck with its eyelids, so he with his nose
Trims his belt and his buttons, and turns out his toes.

[The Gryphon and the Mock Turtle interrupt with a brief exchange about what this unfamiliar version of the poem means, and then insist that Alice continue:]

I passed by his garden, and marked, with one eye,
How the owl and the oyster were sharing a pie—

[Alice's recitation is cut short by the Mock Turtle, who finds the poem "the most confusing thing I ever heard".]

=== Expanded version ===
In 1886, Carroll wrote an altered and expanded version of the poem for the first theatrical adaptation of Alice. In this version, a panther replaces the oyster. A manuscript signed and dated 31 October 1886 reads:

'Tis the voice of the Lobster, I heard him declare
"You have baked me too brown: I must sugar my hair."
As a duck with its eyelids, so he with his nose
Trims his belt & his buttons, & turns out his toes.
When the sands are all dry, he is gay as a lark,
And will talk in contemptuous tones of the Shark:
But, when the tide rises and Sharks are around,
His voice has a timid & tremulous sound.

I passed by his garden, & marked with one eye
How the Owl & the Panther were sharing a pie:
The Panther took pie-crust, & gravy, & meat,
While the Owl got the dish as his share of the treat.
When the pie was all finished, the Owl, as a boon,
Was kindly permitted to pocket the spoon:
While the Panther received knife & fork with a growl,
And concluded the banquet by [eating the Owl].
