= Theophilus Carter =

British furniture dealer

- Born: 1824; Oxford, England
- Died: 21 December 1904 (aged 79–80)
- Resting place: Holywell Cemetery, Oxford
- Occupations: Furniture dealer, cabinet-maker
- Spouse(s): Mary Ann Clarkson (m. 1846; d. 1887); Anne Carter (m. by 1901)
- Children: 5

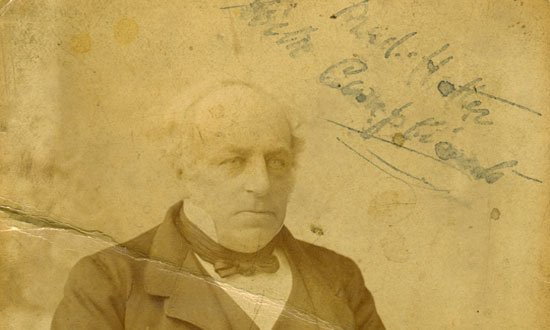
Theophilus Carter c. 1894

Theophilus Carter (1824 – 21 December 1904) was an eccentric British furniture dealer who may have been an inspiration for the illustration by Sir John Tenniel of Lewis Carroll's characters the Mad Hatter in his 1865 novel Alice's Adventures in Wonderland and Hatta in the 1871 sequel Through the Looking-Glass.

== Inventor and craftsman ==
Carter was born in Oxford, the son of Thomas Carter and Harriet (née Eldridge). Some writers claim that Carter was a servitor at Christ Church, one of the University of Oxford's colleges during the 1850s and 1860s, at the same time that Lewis Carroll was there. However, there is no evidence for this claim (see below). It is claimed by some sources that Carter invented The Alarm Clock Bed, exhibited at the Great Exhibition of 1851, and which tipped out the sleeper at waking-up time into a tub of cold water. However, while an alarm clock bed was indeed displayed at the Exhibition – in fact two were – Carter's name is lacking in both the Exhibition's catalogue and any other known documentation.

He was a cabinet-maker and owned a furniture and upholstery shop at 48–49 High Street in Oxford; from 1875 to 1883 at No. 48, and from 1861 to 1894 at No.49, where he employed five men. Census records for 1881 show that Carter lived above this shop with his wife, Mary Anne Carter, daughter, grand-daughter and two servants.

== Family ==
In 1846 Carter married Mary Ann Clarkson (1822–1887), two years his senior, and had the following children:

1. Thomas (born 1847)
2. John (born 1849)
3. Harriet (born 1851)
4. William (born 1855)
5. Frederick (born 1860), who later married Laura Emma Deacon.

According to the 1901 census, Carter was still living in Oxford and was married to an Anne Carter (born 1839).

== The Hatter ==
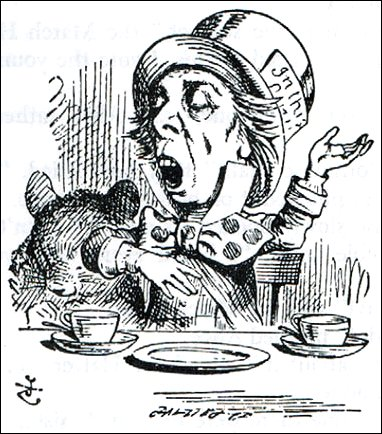
The Hatter as depicted by Tenniel, reciting his nonsense poem, "Twinkle twinkle little bat"

It is often claimed that Carter is Lewis Carroll's inspiration for the character of the Hatter, due to his habit of standing in the door of his shop in Oxford wearing a top hat on the back of his head.

In 1935 H. W. Greene wrote a letter to The Times asserting that Carroll had Tenniel model his drawing of the Mad Hatter on Carter. According to Greene, Carter "was the doubtless unconscious model for the Mad Hatter in 'Through the Looking-Glass' [sic] as depicted by Tenniel, who was brought down to Oxford by the author, as I have heard, on purpose to see him. The likeness was unmistakable." A few days later, the Reverend W. Gordon Baillie disputed the notion that Carter did not know he had been the model for the Mad Hatter:

"Your correspondent, Mr. H.W. Greene, thinks that Theophilus Carter was unaware that he figured in "Through the Looking Glass" [sic] But all Oxford called him "The Mad Hatter," and surely his friends, or enemies, must have chaffed him about it. He would stand at the door of his furniture shop in the High, sometimes in an apron, always with a top-hat at the back of his head, which, with a well-developed nose and a somewhat receding chin, made him an easy target for the caricaturist. The story went that Mr. Dodgson ("Lewis Carroll"), thinking T. C. had imposed upon him, took this revenge. In justice to the man's memory, I may say that I possess a carved oak armchair which I bought from him, second-hand, 50 years ago. It is as good as ever, and the price was very moderate."

Further to this correspondence, W. J. Ryland, who had originally mentioned Carter in connection with the clockwork bed, testified that he had not known "that Carter was the original of the 'Mad Hatter,' but on looking again at the Tenniel drawing I see it is he to the life. To me," he went on, "he was the living image of the late W. E. Gladstone, and, being well aware of the fact, was always careful to wear the high collar and black stock so often depicted in Punch in cartoons of the 'Grand Old Man."

All three witnesses agreed that Carter looked like Tenniel's Mad Hatter. Further, according to Baillie the resemblance was widely noticed, but the explanation of this resemblance is clearly based on hearsay. Over the years, the Carter legend has often been retold, but no evidence has come to light, either in Carroll's diaries, letters, or elsewhere, that Carroll ever brought Tenniel to Oxford for any purpose.

According to Dodgson's nephew, Stuart Dodgson Collingwood, who wrote a biography of his uncle in 1898, during Carroll's undergraduate days at Christ Church he had a place at a dining table along with an unidentified person who was the model for the Mad Hatter. The author Derek Hudson, in his biography of Carroll, believed that Collingwood's reference to a model for the Mad Hatter must be referring to Carter. In the first edition of his biography of Carroll he claimed that Carter was "once of Christ Church" and "later a furniture dealer in the High."

Roger Lancelyn Green failed to find Carter listed in Alumni Oxonienses and concluded that he "may simply have waited" on Carroll's table, and identified Carter as "at one time a servitor at Christ Church and later a furniture dealer with a shop in the High at Oxford." For the second edition of his biography, Hudson revised his description to come into line with Green's, now stating that Carter was "once a servitor of Christ Church" before he became a furniture dealer. However, there is no evidence that either Collingwood or Greene was right about the Mad Hatter, let alone that they both were.

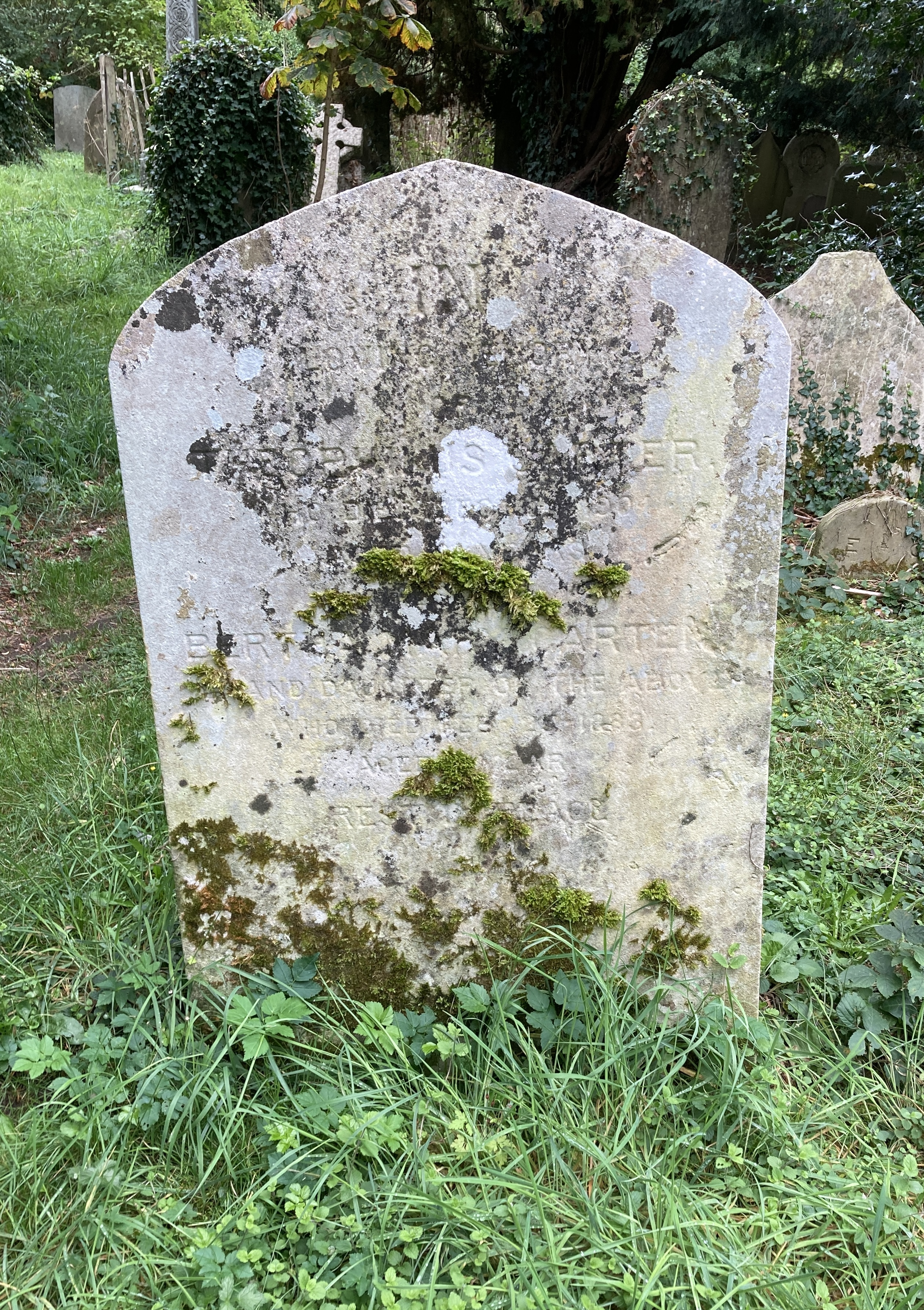
Grave of Theophilus Carter in Holywell Cemetery in Oxford in 2024

In his reference Collingwood seems to be claiming that the model for the Mad Hatter was an undergraduate colleague of Carroll's, and not a waiter. "In those days," he wrote, "the undergraduates dining in hall were divided into 'messes.' Each mess consisted of about half a dozen men, who had a table to themselves. In Mr. Dodgson's mess were Philip Pusey (son of Edward Pusey, the theologian), the late Rev. G. C. Woodhouse, and, among others, one who still lives in 'Alice in Wonderland' as the 'Hatter.' "

Theophilus Carter died in 1904 and was buried in Oxford's Holywell Cemetery (Plot G77). He was buried with his granddaughter, Bertha Mary, aged 1 year (1882–1883).
