= Alice's Adventures in Wonderland =

1865 children's novel by Lewis Carroll

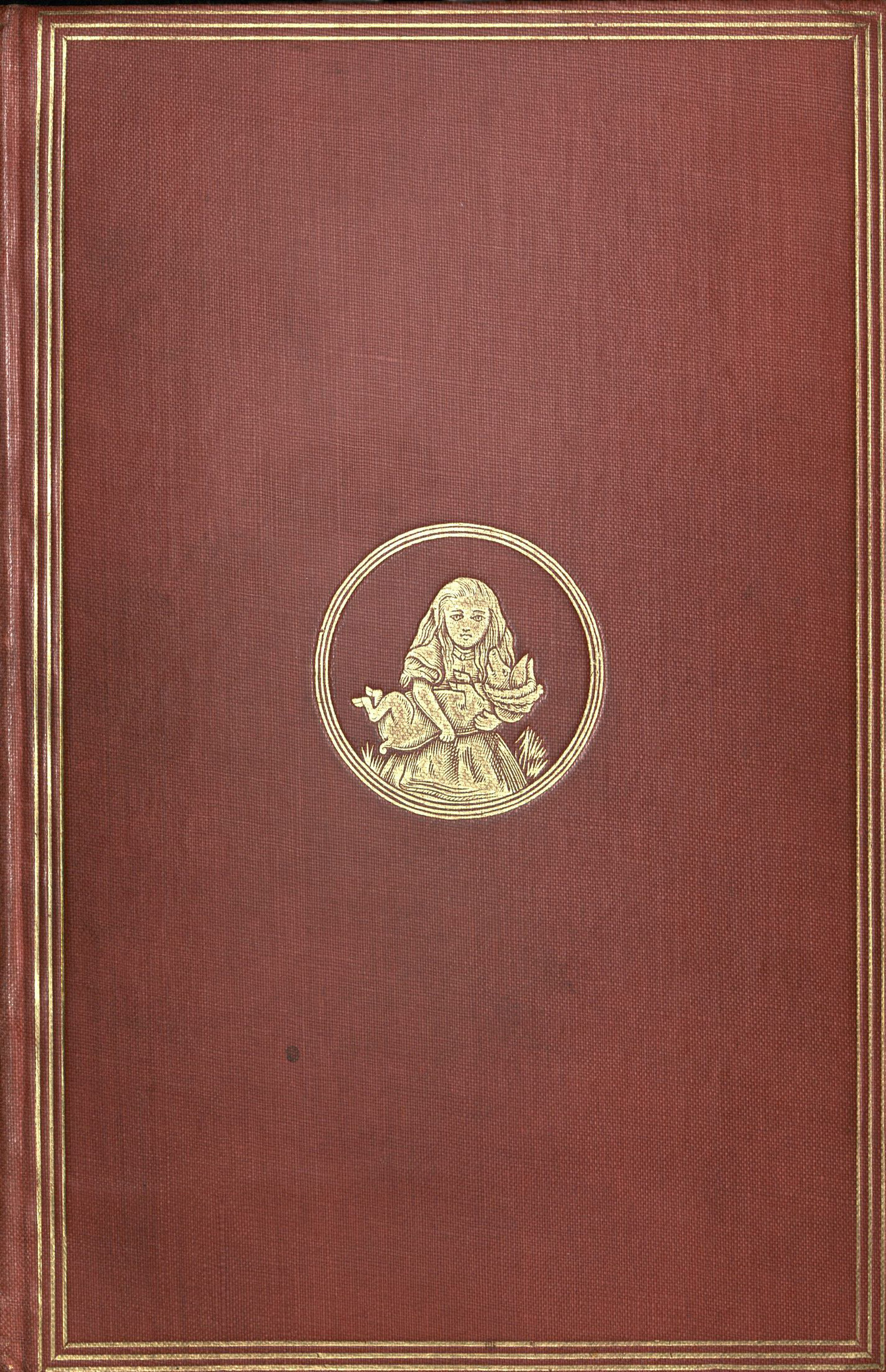
- First edition cover (1865)
- Author: Lewis Carroll
- Illustrator: John Tenniel
- Language: English
- Genre: Children's fiction portal fantasy literary nonsense
- Publisher: Macmillan
- Publication date: November 1865; 161 years ago
- Publication place: United Kingdom
- Media type: Print (hardcover)
- Pages: 192
- Followed by: Through the Looking-Glass
- Text: Alice's Adventures in Wonderland at Wikisource

Alice's Adventures in Wonderland (also known as Alice in Wonderland) is an 1865 English children's novel by Lewis Carroll. It tells the story of a little girl named Alice who falls through a rabbit hole into a fantasy world of anthropomorphic creatures. It is seen as an example of the literary nonsense genre. The artist John Tenniel provided 42 wood-engraved illustrations for the original edition.

The novel received positive reviews upon release. It has become one of the best-known works of Victorian literature; its narrative, structure, characters, and imagery have had a wide influence on popular culture and literature, especially in the fantasy genre. It is credited as helping end an era of didacticism in children's literature, inaugurating an era in which writing for children aimed to "delight or entertain". The tale plays with logic, giving the story lasting popularity with adults as well as with children. The titular character, Alice, shares her name with Alice Liddell, a girl Carroll knew; scholars disagree about the extent to which the character was based upon her.

The novel has never been out of print and has been translated into 174 languages. Its legacy includes adaptations to screen, radio, visual art, ballet, opera, and musical theatre as well as theme parks, board games, and video games. Carroll published a sequel in 1871 entitled Through the Looking-Glass and a shortened version for young children, The Nursery "Alice", in 1890.

== Background ==
=== "All in the golden afternoon..." ===
Alice's Adventures in Wonderland was conceived on 4 July 1862, when Lewis Carroll and the Reverend Robinson Duckworth rowed up the river Isis with the three young daughters of Carroll's friend Henry Liddell: Lorina Charlotte (aged 13; "Prima" in the book's prefatory verse); Alice Pleasance (aged 10; "Secunda" in the verse); and Edith Mary (aged 8; "Tertia" in the verse).

Lewis Carroll in 1863

The journey began at Folly Bridge, Oxford, and ended 5 miles (8 km) upstream at Godstow, Oxfordshire. During the trip, Carroll told the girls a story that he described in his diary as "Alice's Adventures Under Ground", which his journal says he "undertook to write out for Alice". Alice Liddell recalled that she asked Carroll to write it down: unlike other stories he had told her, this one she wanted to preserve. She finally received the manuscript more than two years later.

The day 4 July was known as the "golden afternoon", prefaced in the novel as a poem. In fact, the weather around Oxford on 4 July was "cool and rather wet", although at least one scholar has disputed this claim. Scholars debate whether Carroll in fact came up with Alice during the "golden afternoon" or whether the story was developed over a longer period.

Carroll had known the Liddell children since around March 1856, when he befriended Harry Liddell. He had met Lorina by early March as well. In June 1856, he took the children out on the river. Robert Douglas-Fairhurst, who wrote a literary biography of Carroll, suggests that Carroll favoured Alice Pleasance Liddell in particular because her name was ripe for allusion. "Pleasance" means pleasure and the name "Alice" appeared in contemporary works, including the poem "Alice Gray" by William Mee, of which Carroll wrote a parody; Alice is a character in "Dream-Children: A Reverie", a prose piece by Charles Lamb. Carroll, an amateur photographer by the late 1850s, produced many photographic portraits of the Liddell children – and especially of Alice, of which 20 survive.

=== Manuscript: Alice's Adventures Under Ground ===
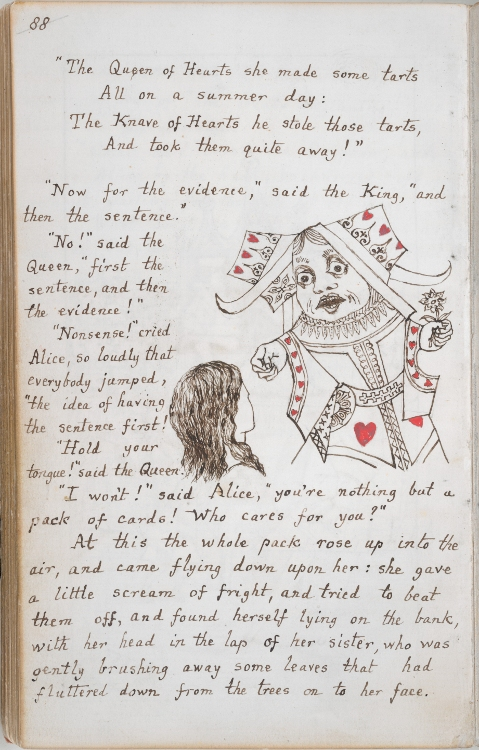
Page from the manuscript of Alice's Adventures Under Ground, 1864. Handwritten and illustrated by Carroll, it is held in the British Library.

Carroll began writing the manuscript of the story the next day, although that earliest version is lost. The girls and Carroll took another boat trip a month later, when he elaborated the plot of the story to Alice, and in November, he began working on the manuscript in earnest. To add the finishing touches, he researched natural history in connection with the animals presented in the book and then had the book examined by other children—particularly those of George MacDonald. Though Carroll did add his own illustrations to the original copy, on publication he was advised to find a professional illustrator so that the pictures were more appealing to his audience. He subsequently approached Punch cartoonist John Tenniel to reinterpret his visions through his own artistic eye, telling him that the story had been well-liked by the children.

Carroll began planning a print edition of the Alice story in 1863. He wrote on 9 May 1863 that MacDonald's family had suggested he publish Alice. A diary entry for 2 July says that he received a specimen page of the print edition around that date. On 26 November 1864, Carroll gave Alice the manuscript of Alice's Adventures Under Ground, with illustrations by Carroll, dedicating it as "A Christmas Gift to a Dear Child in Memory of a Summer's Day". The published version of Alice's Adventures in Wonderland is about twice the length of Alice's Adventures Under Ground and includes episodes, such as the Mad Hatter's Tea-Party, that do not appear in the manuscript. The only known manuscript copy of Under Ground is held in the British Library. Macmillan published a facsimile in 1886.

== Plot ==
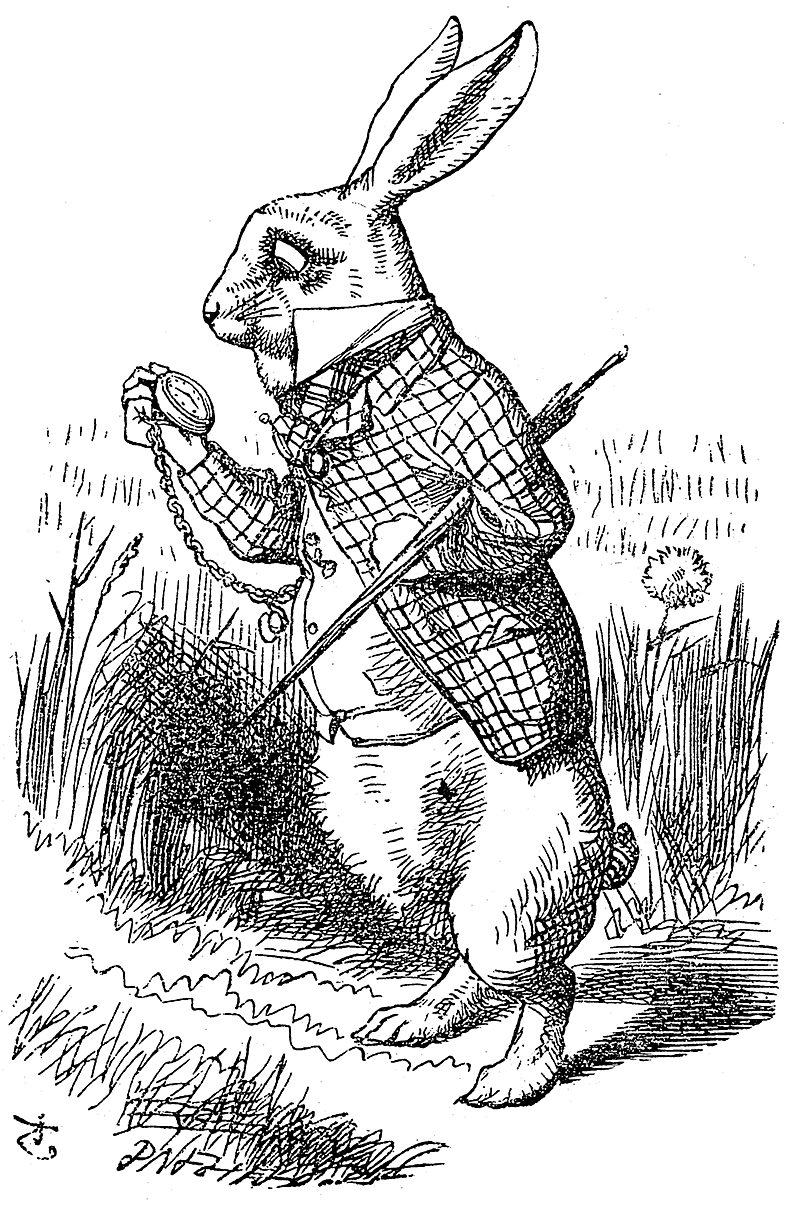
The White Rabbit

Sitting with her older sister on a bank, and feeling rather sleepy and bored, Alice suddenly spots a White Rabbit with a pocket watch and waistcoat hurrying by, lamenting that he is late. Surprised, Alice follows him down a rabbit hole, which sends her into a lengthy fall. Landing safely, she finds herself inside a room where she discovers a key to a tiny door, beyond which is a garden. While pondering how to fit through the door, she notices a bottle labelled "Drink me". Alice drinks some of the contents and, to her astonishment, shrinks small enough to enter the door. However, she had left the key on a table and is now unable to reach it. She finds and eats a cake labelled "Eat me", which causes her to grow to a tremendous size. Distraught, Alice bursts into tears. As she cries, the White Rabbit rushes past, dropping a fan and gloves. Alice uses the fan to cool herself down, which causes her to shrink once more and leaves her swimming in a pool of her own tears. There she meets various animals and birds, who convene on a bank and engage in a "Caucus Race" to dry themselves. Alice inadvertently frightens the animals away by mentioning her cat.

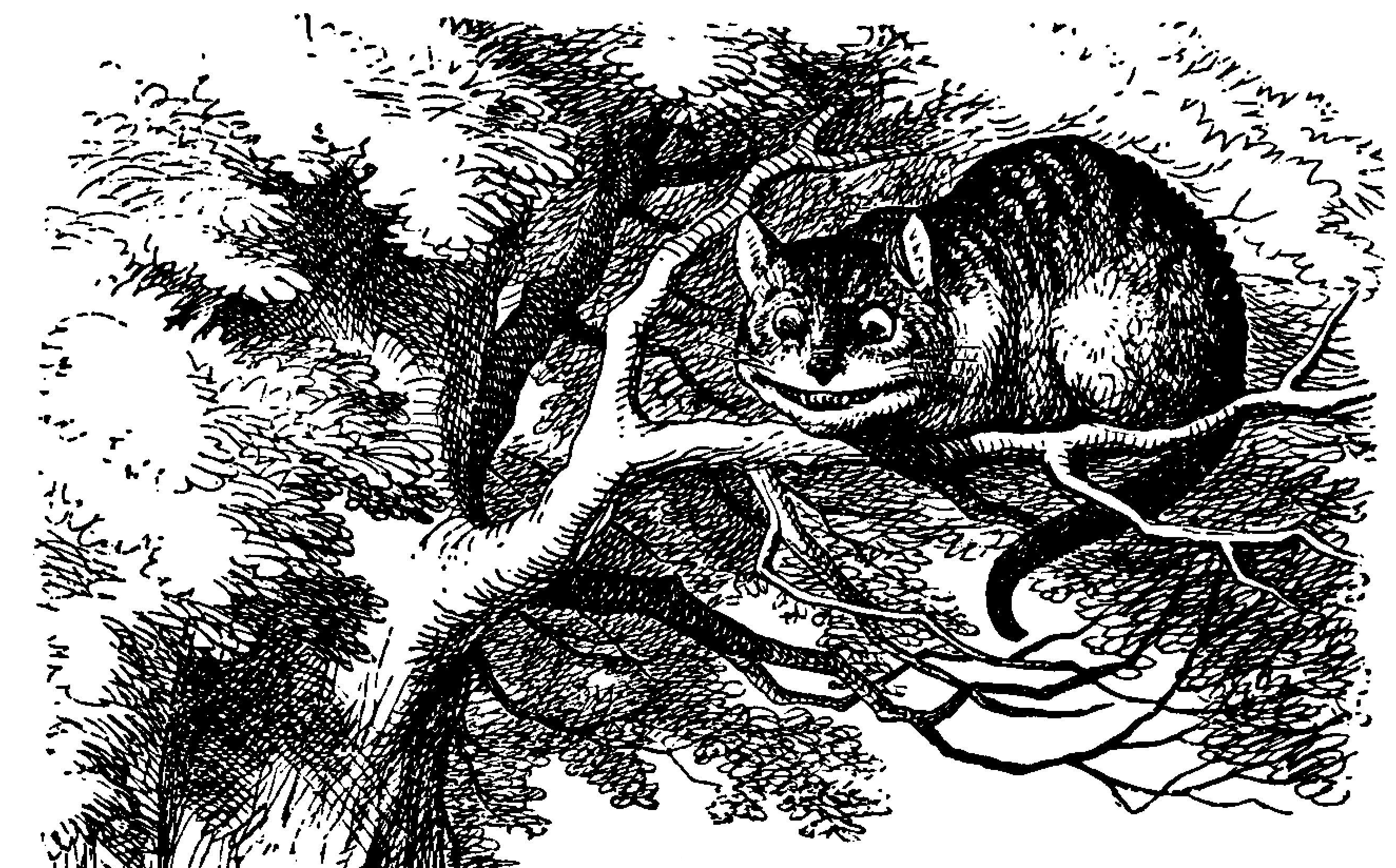
The Cheshire Cat

Mistaking her for his maidservant, the White Rabbit orders Alice to go to his house and retrieve his lost gloves and fan. Alice finds another bottle and drinks from it, causing her to grow to such an extent that she gets stuck in the house. Attempting to extract her, the White Rabbit and his neighbours eventually take to hurling pebbles that turn into small cakes. Alice eats one and shrinks herself, allowing her to flee into the forest. She meets a Caterpillar seated on a mushroom and smoking a hookah. Under the Caterpillar's questioning, Alice begins to admit to her current identity crisis, compounded by her inability to remember a poem. Before crawling away, the Caterpillar says that a bite of one side of the mushroom will make her larger, while a bite from the other side will make her smaller. During a period of trial and error, Alice's neck extends between the treetops, frightening a pigeon who mistakes her for a serpent. After shrinking to an appropriate height, Alice arrives at the home of a Duchess, who owns a perpetually grinning Cheshire Cat. The Duchess's baby, whom she hands to Alice, transforms into a piglet, which Alice releases into the woods. The Cheshire Cat appears to Alice and directs her toward the Hatter and March Hare before disappearing, leaving his grin behind. Alice finds the Hatter, March Hare, and a sleepy Dormouse in the middle of a tea party. The Hatter explains that it is always 6 p.m. (tea time) – the consequence of his having quarrelled with Time. Unable to answer the riddle "Why is a raven like a writing desk?", and considering the company rude, Alice walks off, declaring "It's the stupidest tea-party I ever was at in all my life!"

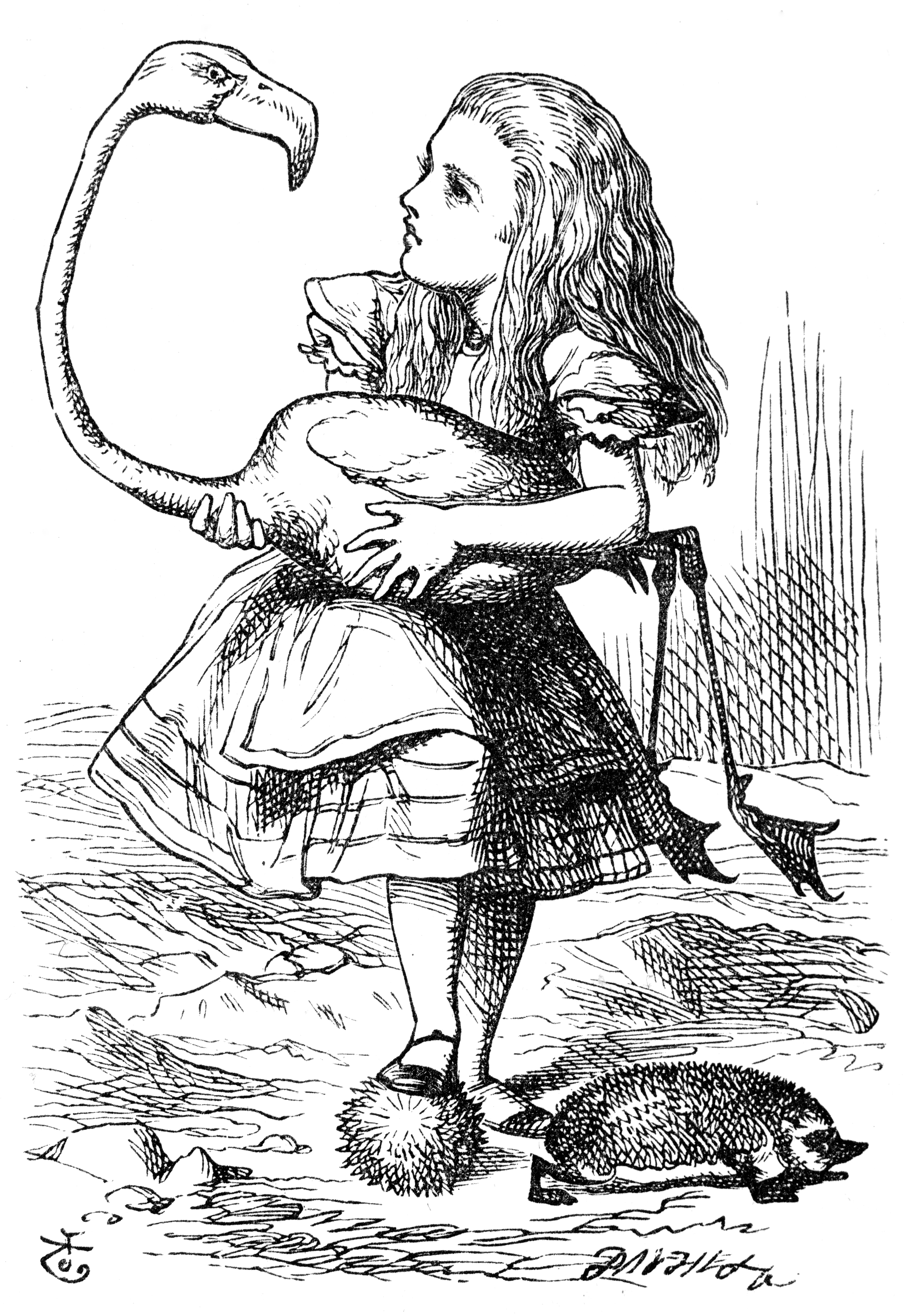
Alice trying to play croquet with a Flamingo

Noticing a door in a tree, Alice passes through and finds herself back in the room from the beginning of her journey. She takes the key and opens the door to the garden, which turns out to be the croquet court of the Queen of Hearts, whose guard consists of living playing cards. Alice participates in a croquet game, in which hedgehogs are used as balls, flamingos are used as mallets, and soldiers act as hoops. The Queen is short-tempered, constantly ordering beheadings. When the Cheshire Cat's lone head appears, the Queen orders its beheading, an act which appears impossible in the absence of a body from which to sever it. Alice prompts the Queen to release the Duchess, now in prison.

Alice meets a Gryphon and a Mock Turtle, who dance to the Lobster Quadrille while Alice recites (rather incorrectly) a poem. The Mock Turtle sings "Beautiful Soup", during which the Gryphon drags Alice away for a trial, in which the Knave of Hearts stands accused of stealing the Queen's tarts. The trial is conducted by the King of Hearts, and the jury is composed of animals that Alice previously met. Alice gradually grows in size and confidence, allowing herself increasingly frequent remarks on the irrationality of the proceedings. The Queen eventually commands Alice's beheading, but Alice scoffs that her guard is only a pack of playing cards. The cards rise up into the air and come swarming down upon her.

Alice wakes from her dream to find her sister brushing leaves from her face. Alice tells her about her adventures, then runs in for her tea, leaving her sister on the bank to imagine all the curious happenings for herself.

== Characters ==
The main characters in Alice's Adventures in Wonderland are the following:

- Alice
- The White Rabbit
- The Mouse
- The Dodo
- The Lory
- The Eaglet
- The Duck
- Pat
- Bill the Lizard
- Puppy
- The Caterpillar
- The Duchess
- The Cheshire Cat
- The Hatter
- The March Hare
- The Dormouse
- The Queen of Hearts
- The King of Hearts
- The Knave of Hearts
- The Gryphon
- The Mock Turtle

=== Character allusions ===
Mad Tea Party. Theophilus Carter, an eccentric furniture dealer from Oxford, has been suggested as a model for The Hatter.

In The Annotated Alice, Martin Gardner provides background information for the characters. The members of the boating party that first heard Carroll's tale show up in chapter 3 ("A Caucus-Race and a Long Tale"). Alice Liddell is there, while Carroll is caricatured as the Dodo (Lewis Carroll was a pen name for Charles Lutwidge Dodgson; because he stuttered when he spoke, he sometimes pronounced his last name as "Dodo-Dodgson"). The Duck refers to Robinson Duckworth, and the Lory and Eaglet to Alice Liddell's sisters Lorina and Edith.

Bill the Lizard may be a play on the name of British Prime Minister Benjamin Disraeli. One of Tenniel's illustrations in Through the Looking-Glass—the 1871 sequel to Alice—depicts the character referred to as the "Man in White Paper" (whom Alice meets on a train) as a caricature of Disraeli, wearing a paper hat. The illustrations of the Lion and the Unicorn (also in Looking-Glass) look like Tenniel's Punch illustrations of William Ewart Gladstone and Disraeli, although Gardner says there is "no proof" that they were intended to represent these politicians.

Gardner has suggested that the Hatter is a reference to Theophilus Carter, an Oxford furniture dealer, and that Tenniel apparently drew the Hatter to resemble Carter, on a suggestion of Carroll's. The Dormouse tells a story about three little sisters named Elsie, Lacie, and Tillie. These are the Liddell sisters: Elsie is L.C. (Lorina Charlotte); Tillie is Edith (her family nickname is Matilda); and Lacie is an anagram of Alice.

The Mock Turtle speaks of a drawling-master, "an old conger eel", who came once a week to teach "Drawling, Stretching, and Fainting in Coils". This is a reference to the art critic John Ruskin, who came once a week to the Liddell house to teach the children to draw, sketch, and paint in oils. The Mock Turtle sings "Turtle Soup", a parody of a song called "Star of the Evening, Beautiful Star", which the Liddells sang for Carroll.

== Poems and songs ==
Carroll wrote multiple poems and songs for Alice's Adventures in Wonderland, including:

- "All in the golden afternoon..."—the prefatory verse to the book, an original poem by Carroll that recalls the rowing expedition on which he first told the story of Alice's adventures underground
- "How Doth the Little Crocodile"—a parody of Isaac Watts's nursery rhyme, "Against Idleness and Mischief"
- "The Mouse's Tale"—an example of concrete poetry
- "You Are Old, Father William"—a parody of Robert Southey's "The Old Man's Comforts and How He Gained Them"
- The Duchess's lullaby, "Speak roughly to your little boy..."—a parody of David Bates' "Speak Gently"
- "Twinkle, Twinkle, Little Bat"—a parody of Jane Taylor's "Twinkle Twinkle Little Star"
- "The Lobster Quadrille"—a parody of Mary Botham Howitt's "The Spider and the Fly"
- "'Tis the Voice of the Lobster"—a parody of Isaac Watts's "The Sluggard"
- "Beautiful Soup"—a parody of James M. Sayles's "Star of the Evening, Beautiful Star"
- "The Queen of Hearts"—an actual nursery rhyme
- "They told me you had been to her..."—White Rabbit's evidence

== Writing style and themes ==
=== Symbolism ===
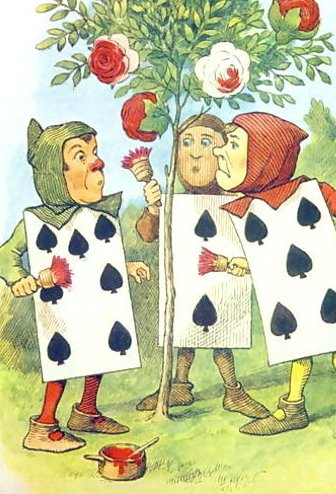
Three cards painting the white rose tree red to cover it up from the Queen of Hearts (coloured Tenniel illustration)

Carroll's biographer Morton N. Cohen reads Alice as a roman à clef populated with real figures from Carroll's life. Alice is based on Alice Liddell; the Dodo is Carroll; Wonderland is Oxford; even the Mad Hatter's Tea Party, according to Cohen, is a send-up of Alice's own birthday party. The critic Jan Susina rejects Cohen's account, arguing that Alice the character bears a tenuous relationship with Alice Liddell.

Beyond its refashioning of Carroll's everyday life, Cohen argues, Alice critiques Victorian ideals of childhood. It is an account of "the child's plight in Victorian upper-class society", in which Alice's mistreatment by the creatures of Wonderland reflects Carroll's own mistreatment by older people as a child.

In the eighth chapter, three cards are painting the roses on a rose tree red, because they had accidentally planted a white-rose tree that the Queen of Hearts hates. According to Wilfrid Scott-Giles, the rose motif in Alice alludes to the English Wars of the Roses: red roses symbolised the House of Lancaster, and white roses the rival House of York.

=== Language ===
Alice is full of linguistic play, puns, and parodies. According to Gillian Beer, Carroll's play with language evokes the feeling of words for new readers: they "still have insecure edges and a nimbus of nonsense blurs the sharp focus of terms". The literary scholar Jessica Straley, in a work about the role of evolutionary theory in Victorian children's literature, argues that Carroll's focus on language prioritises humanism over scientism by emphasising language's role in human self-conception.

Pat's "digging for apples" is a cross-language pun, as pomme de terre (literally; "apple of the earth") means potato and pomme means apple. In the second chapter, Alice initially addresses the mouse as "O Mouse", based on her memory of the noun declensions "in her brother's Latin Grammar, 'A mouse – of a mouse – to a mouse – a mouse – O mouse!'" These words correspond to the first five of Latin's six cases, in a traditional order established by medieval grammarians: mus (nominative), muris (genitive), muri (dative), murem (accusative), (O) mus (vocative). The sixth case, mure (ablative) is absent from Alice's recitation. Nilson suggests that Alice's missing ablative is a pun on her father Henry Liddell's work on the standard A Greek-English Lexicon, since ancient Greek does not have an ablative case. Further, mousa (μούσα, meaning muse) was a standard model noun in Greek textbooks of the time in paradigms of the first declension, short-alpha noun.

=== Mathematics ===
Mathematics and logic are central to Alice. As Carroll was a mathematician at Christ Church, it has been suggested that there are many references and mathematical concepts in both this story and Through the Looking-Glass. Literary scholar Melanie Bayley asserts in the New Scientist magazine that Carroll wrote Alice in Wonderland in its final form as a satire on mid-19th century mathematics.

=== Eating and devouring ===
Carina Garland notes how the world is "expressed via representations of food and appetite", naming Alice's frequent desire for consumption (of both food and words), her 'Curious Appetites'. Often, the idea of eating coincides to make gruesome images. After the riddle "Why is a raven like a writing-desk?", the Hatter claims that Alice might as well say, "I see what I eat...I eat what I see" and so the riddle's solution, put forward by Boe Birns, could be that "A raven eats worms; a writing desk is worm-eaten"; this idea of food encapsulates idea of life feeding on life itself, for the worm is being eaten and then becomes the eater—a horrific image of mortality.

Nina Auerbach discusses how the novel revolves around eating and drinking which "motivates much of her [Alice's] behaviour", for the story is essentially about things "entering and leaving her mouth." The animals of Wonderland are of particular interest, for Alice's relation to them shifts constantly because, as Lovell-Smith states, Alice's changes in size continually reposition her in the food chain, serving as a way to make her acutely aware of the 'eat or be eaten' attitude that permeates Wonderland.

=== Nonsense ===
Alice is an example of the literary nonsense genre. According to Humphrey Carpenter, Alice's brand of nonsense embraces the nihilistic and existential. Characters in nonsensical episodes such as the Mad Hatter's Tea Party, in which it is always the same time, go on posing paradoxes that are never resolved.

=== Rules and games ===
Wonderland is a rule-bound world, but its rules are not those of our world. The literary scholar Daniel Bivona writes that Alice is characterised by "gamelike social structures". She trusts in instructions from the beginning, drinking from the bottle labelled "drink me" after recalling, during her descent, that children who do not follow the rules often meet terrible fates. Unlike the creatures of Wonderland, who approach their world's wonders uncritically, Alice continues to look for rules as the story progresses. Gillian Beer suggests that Alice looks for rules to soothe her anxiety, while Carroll may have hunted for rules because he struggled with the implications of the non-Euclidean geometry then in development.

== Illustrations ==
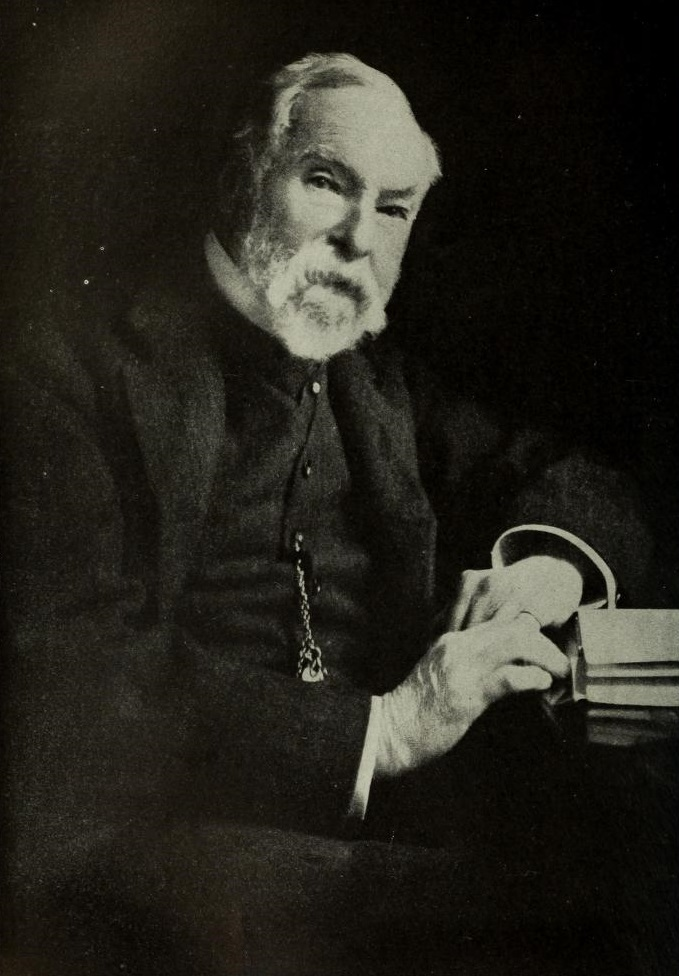
John Tenniel, who was already famous as the chief cartoonist for Punch, was approached by Carroll to provide the illustrations for the published novel.

The manuscript was illustrated by Carroll, who added 37 illustrations—printed in a facsimile edition in 1887. John Tenniel provided 42 wood-engraved illustrations for the 1865 published version of the book. The first print run was destroyed (or sold in the US) at Carroll's request because Tenniel was dissatisfied with the printing quality. There are only 22 known first edition copies in existence. The book was reprinted and published in 1866. Tenniel's detailed black-and-white drawings remain the definitive depiction of the characters.

Carroll's text was often light on description, and Tenniel invented his own characterisations, drawing from a vast range of sources, including fine art, natural history, heraldry, caricature and his previous work for Punch. Once committed to paper, the now famous illustrations were carved into woodblocks by engravers, and electrotype copies made to be used by the publishers Macmillan for printing. The praise from critics and readers following publication was unanimous.

— The V&A museum on Tenniel's illustrations for the novel.

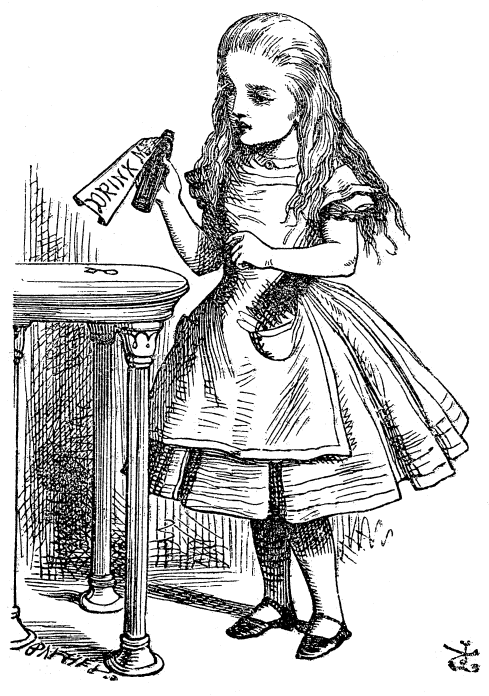
Alice by Tenniel, one of his 42 illustrations for the novel.

Tenniel's illustrations of Alice do not portray the real Alice Liddell, who had dark hair and a short fringe. In 1911, Harry Theaker, with Tenniel's approval, was commissioned by Macmillan to colour sixteen of Tenniel's plates for an Alice edition and her dress was blue – and has remained so in the popular mind ever since. Alice has provided a challenge for other illustrators, including those of 1907 by Charles Pears and the full series of colour plates and line-drawings by Harry Rountree published in the (inter-War) Children's Press (Glasgow) edition. Other significant illustrators include: Arthur Rackham (1907), Willy Pogany (1929), Mervyn Peake (1946), Ralph Steadman (1967), Salvador Dalí (1969), Graham Overden (1969), Max Ernst (1970), Peter Blake (1970), Tove Jansson (1977), Anthony Browne (1988), Helen Oxenbury (1999), and Lisbeth Zwerger (1999). To mark the 200th anniversary of Tenniel's birth, in 2020 Chris Riddell provided illustrations for a new edition of the novel.

== Publication history ==
Carroll first met Alexander Macmillan, a high-powered London publisher, on 19 October 1863. His firm, Macmillan Publishers, agreed to publish Alice's Adventures in Wonderland by sometime in 1864. Carroll financed the initial print run, possibly because it gave him more editorial authority than other financing methods. He managed publication details such as typesetting and engaged illustrators and translators.

Macmillan had published The Water-Babies, also a children's fantasy, in 1863, and suggested its design as a basis for Alice's. Carroll saw a specimen copy in May 1865. 2,000 copies were printed by July, but Tenniel objected to their quality, and Carroll instructed Macmillan to halt publication so they could be reprinted. In August, he engaged Richard Clay as an alternative printer for a new run of 2,000. The reprint cost £600, paid entirely by Carroll. He received the first copy of Clay's edition on 9 November 1865.

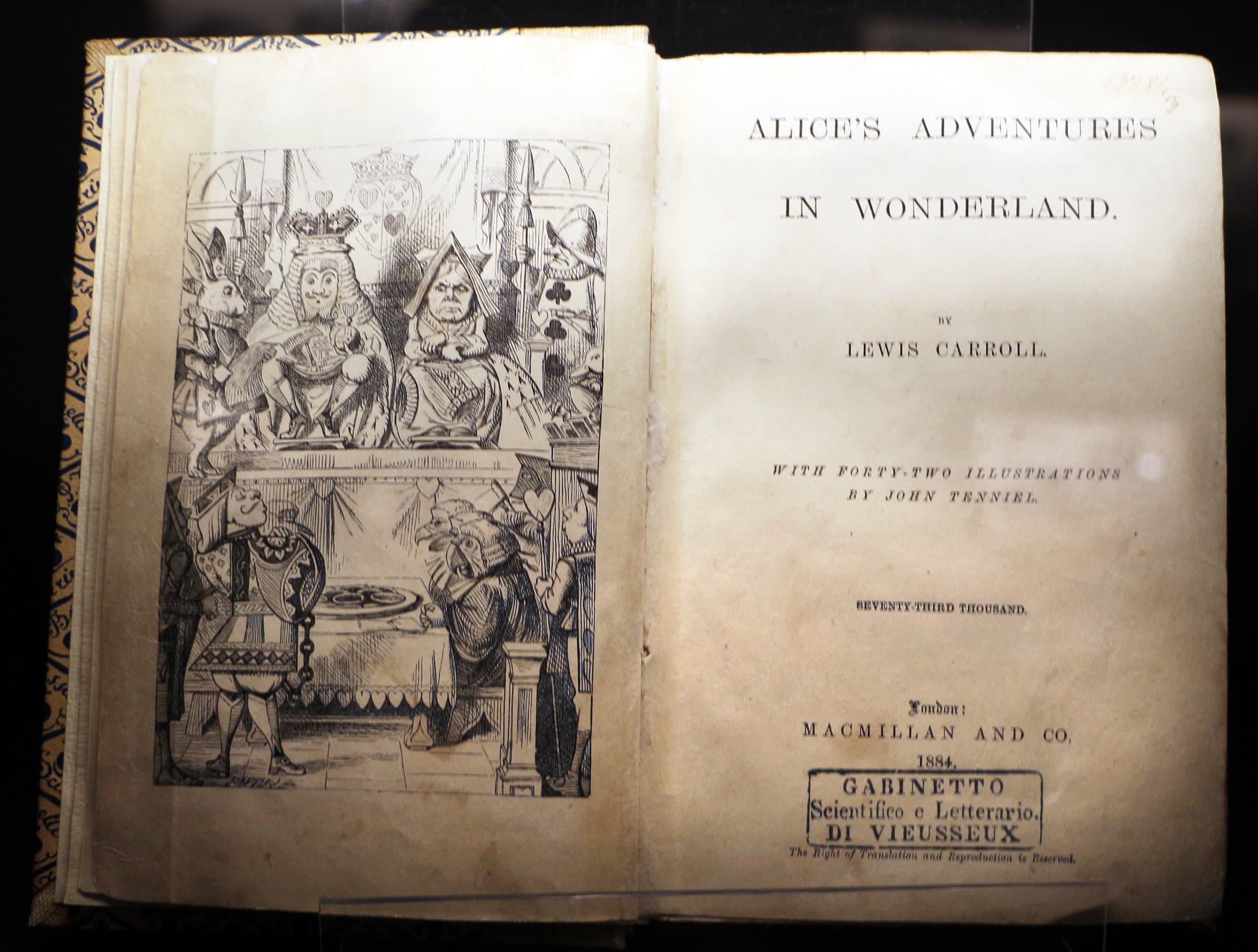
Opening pages of Alice's Adventures in Wonderland, Macmillan Publishers, London

Macmillan finally published the new edition, printed by Richard Clay, in November 1865. Carroll requested a red binding, deeming it appealing to young readers. A new edition, released in December 1865 for the Christmas market but carrying an 1866 date, was quickly printed. The text blocks of the original edition were removed from the binding and sold with Carroll's permission to the New York publishing house of D. Appleton & Company. The binding for the Appleton Alice was identical to the 1866 Macmillan Alice, except for the publisher's name at the foot of the spine. The title page of the Appleton Alice was an insert cancelling the original Macmillan title page of 1865 and bearing the New York publisher's imprint and the date 1866.

The entire print run sold out quickly. Alice was a publishing sensation, beloved by children and adults alike. Oscar Wilde was a fan; Queen Victoria was also an avid reader of the book. She reportedly enjoyed Alice enough that she asked for Carroll's next book, which turned out to be a mathematical treatise; Carroll denied this. The book has never been out of print. Alice's Adventures in Wonderland has been translated into 174 languages.

=== Publication timeline ===
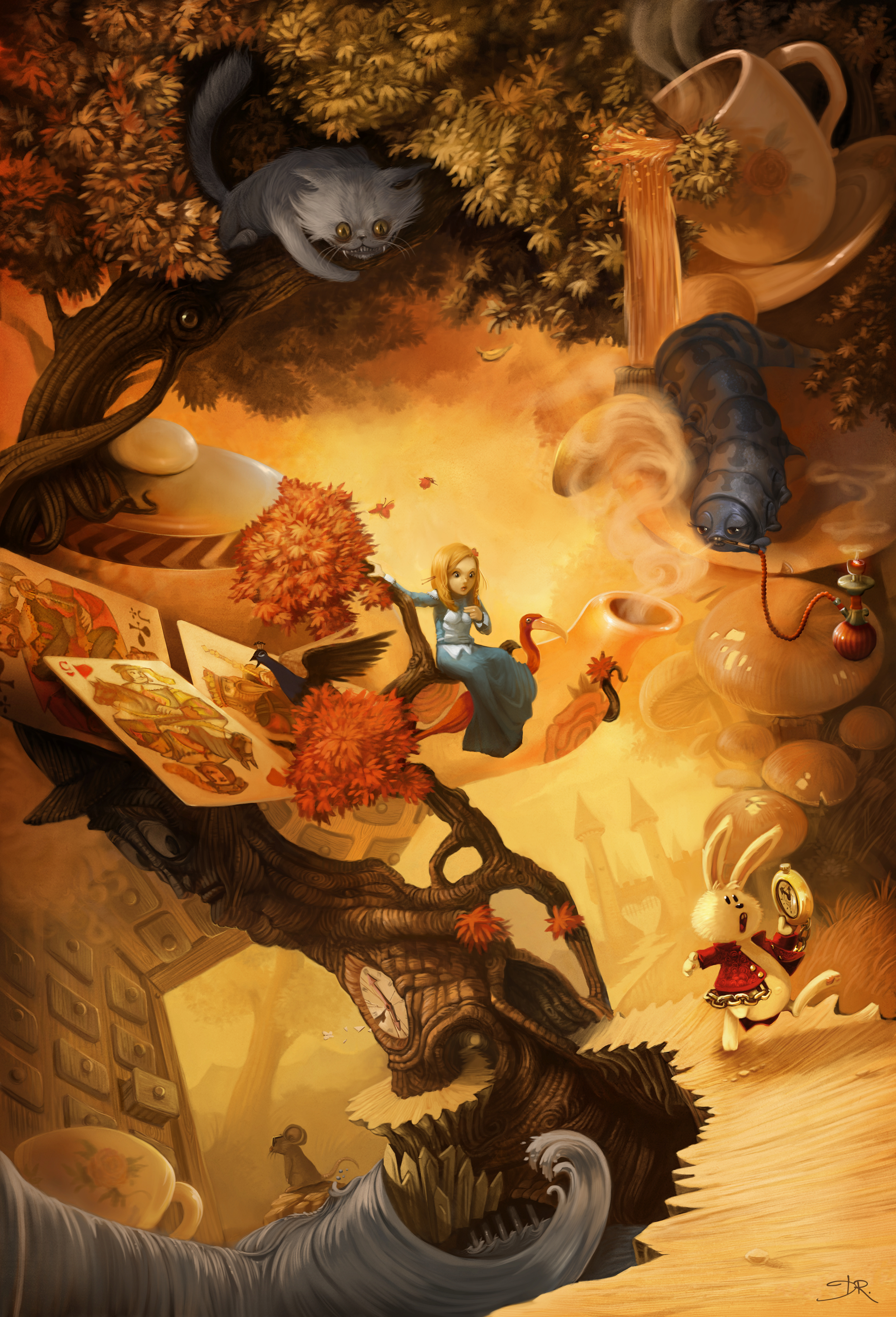
In 1907, the copyright on Alice's Adventures in Wonderland expired in the UK, entering the tale into the public domain. Since the story was intimately tied to the illustrations by Tenniel, new illustrated versions were then received with some significant objection by English reviewers. In 2010, artist David Revoy received the CG Choice Award for his digital painting "Alice in Wonderland".

The following list is a timeline of major publication events related to Alice's Adventures in Wonderland:

- 1869: Published in German as Alice's Abenteuer im Wunderland, translated by Antonie Zimmermann.
- 1869: Published in French as Aventures d'Alice au pays des merveilles, translated by Henri Bué.
- 1870: Published in Swedish as Alice's Äventyr i Sagolandet, translated by Emily Nonnen.
- 1871: Carroll meets another Alice, Alice Raikes, during his time in London. He talks with her about her reflection in a mirror, leading to the sequel, Through the Looking-Glass, and What Alice Found There, which sells even better.
- 1872: Published in Italian as Le Avventure di Alice nel Paese delle Meraviglie, translated by Teodorico Pietrocòla Rossetti.
- 1886: Carroll publishes a facsimile of the earlier Alice's Adventures Under Ground manuscript.
- 1890: Carroll publishes The Nursery "Alice", an abridged version, around Easter.
- 1905: Mrs J. C. Gorham publishes Alice's Adventures in Wonderland Retold in Words of One Syllable in a series of such books published by A. L. Burt Company, aimed at young readers.
- 1906: Published in Finnish as Liisan seikkailut ihmemaailmassa, translated by Anni Swan.
- 1907: Copyright on Alice's Adventures in Wonderland expires in the UK, entering the tale into the public domain, 42 years after its publication, some nine years after Carroll's death in January 1898.
- 1910: Published in Esperanto as La Aventuroj de Alicio en Mirlando, translated by E. L. Kearney.
- 1915: Alice Gerstenberg's stage adaptation premieres.
- 1928: The manuscript of Alice's Adventures Under Ground written and illustrated by Carroll, which he had given to Alice Liddell, was sold at Sotheby's in London on 3 April. It was sold to Philip Rosenbach of Philadelphia for £15,400, a world record for the sale of a manuscript at the time; the buyer later presented it to the British Library (where the manuscript remains) as an appreciation for Britain's part in two World Wars.
- 1960: American writer Martin Gardner publishes a special edition, The Annotated Alice.
- 1988: Lewis Carroll and Anthony Browne, illustrator of an edition from Julia MacRae Books, win the Kurt Maschler Award.
- 1998: Carroll's own copy of Alice, one of only six surviving copies of the 1865 first edition, is sold at an auction for US$1.54 million to an anonymous American buyer, becoming the most expensive children's book (or 19th-century work of literature) ever sold to that point.
- 1999: Lewis Carroll and Helen Oxenbury, illustrators of an edition from Walker Books, win the Kurt Maschler Award for integrated writing and illustration.
- 2008: Folio publishes Alice's Adventures Under Ground facsimile edition (limited to 3,750 copies, boxed with The Original Alice pamphlet).
- 2009: Children's book collector and former American football player Pat McInally reportedly sold Alice Liddell's own copy at auction for US$115,000.

== Reception ==
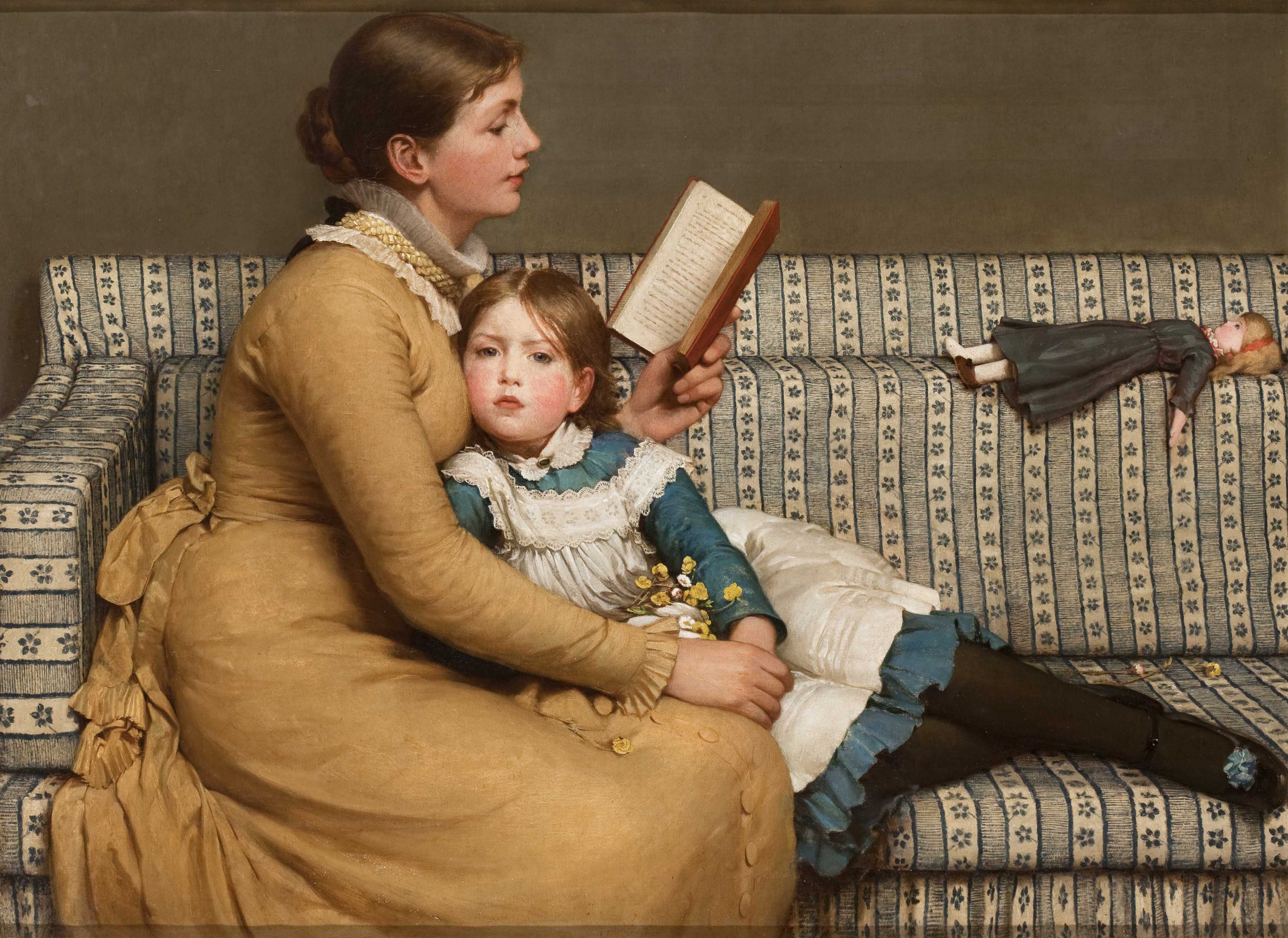
Alice in Wonderland (1879) by the artist George Dunlop Leslie. Exhibited at the Royal Academy of Arts, it depicts a mother reading the book to her child (whose light blue dress and white pinafore were inspired by Alice).

Alice was published to critical praise. One magazine declared it "exquisitely wild, fantastic, [and] impossible". In the late 19th century, Walter Besant wrote that Alice in Wonderland "was a book of that extremely rare kind which will belong to all the generations to come until the language becomes obsolete".

No story in English literature has intrigued me more than Lewis Carroll's Alice in Wonderland. It fascinated me the first time I read it as a schoolboy.

— Walt Disney in The American Weekly, 1946.

F. J. Harvey Darton argued in a 1932 book that Alice ended an era of didacticism in children's literature, inaugurating a new era in which writing for children aimed to "delight or entertain". In 2014, Robert McCrum named Alice "one of the best loved in the English canon" and called it "perhaps the greatest, possibly most influential, and certainly the most world-famous Victorian English fiction". A 2020 review in Time states: "The book changed young people's literature. It helped to replace stiff Victorian didacticism with a looser, sillier, nonsense style that reverberated through the works of language-loving 20th-century authors as different as James Joyce, Douglas Adams and Dr. Seuss." Joe Sommerlad in The Independent writes that Roald Dahl "owes a debt to the "Drink Me" episode in Alice" in regard to Dahl's George's Marvellous Medicine where the protagonist's grandmother drinks a potion and is blown up to the size of a farmhouse. The protagonist of the story, Alice, has been recognised as a cultural icon. In 2006, Alice in Wonderland was named among the icons of England in a public vote.

== Adaptations and influence ==
Books for children in the Alice mould emerged as early as 1869 and continued to appear throughout the late 19th century. Released in 1903, the British silent film Alice in Wonderland was the first screen adaptation of the book.

In 2015, Robert Douglas-Fairhurst wrote in the Guardian,

Since the first publication of Alice's Adventures in Wonderland 150 years ago, Lewis Carroll's work has spawned a whole industry, from films and theme park rides to products such as a "cute and sassy" Alice costume ("petticoat and stockings not included"). The blank-faced little girl made famous by John Tenniel's original illustrations has become a cultural inkblot we can interpret in any way we like.

Labelled "a dauntless, no-nonsense heroine" by the Guardian, the character of the plucky, yet proper, Alice has proven immensely popular and inspired similar heroines in literature and pop culture, many also named Alice in homage. The book has inspired numerous film and television adaptations, which have multiplied, as the original work is now in the public domain in all jurisdictions. Musical works inspired by Alice include the Beatles's song "Lucy in the Sky with Diamonds"; songwriter John Lennon attributed the song's fantastical imagery to his reading of Carroll's books. Argentine prog-rock band Seru Giran used Alice as a metaphor to represent the political climate in Argentina during the 1970s in their song "Canción de Alicia en el país". A popular figure in Japan since the country opened up to the West in the late 19th century, Alice has been a popular subject for writers of manga and a source of inspiration for Japanese fashion, in particular Lolita fashion.

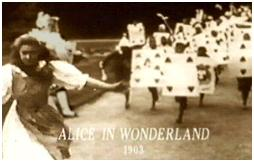
Screenshot of the British silent film Alice in Wonderland (1903), the first screen adaptation of the book, which the BFI called a "landmark fantasy"

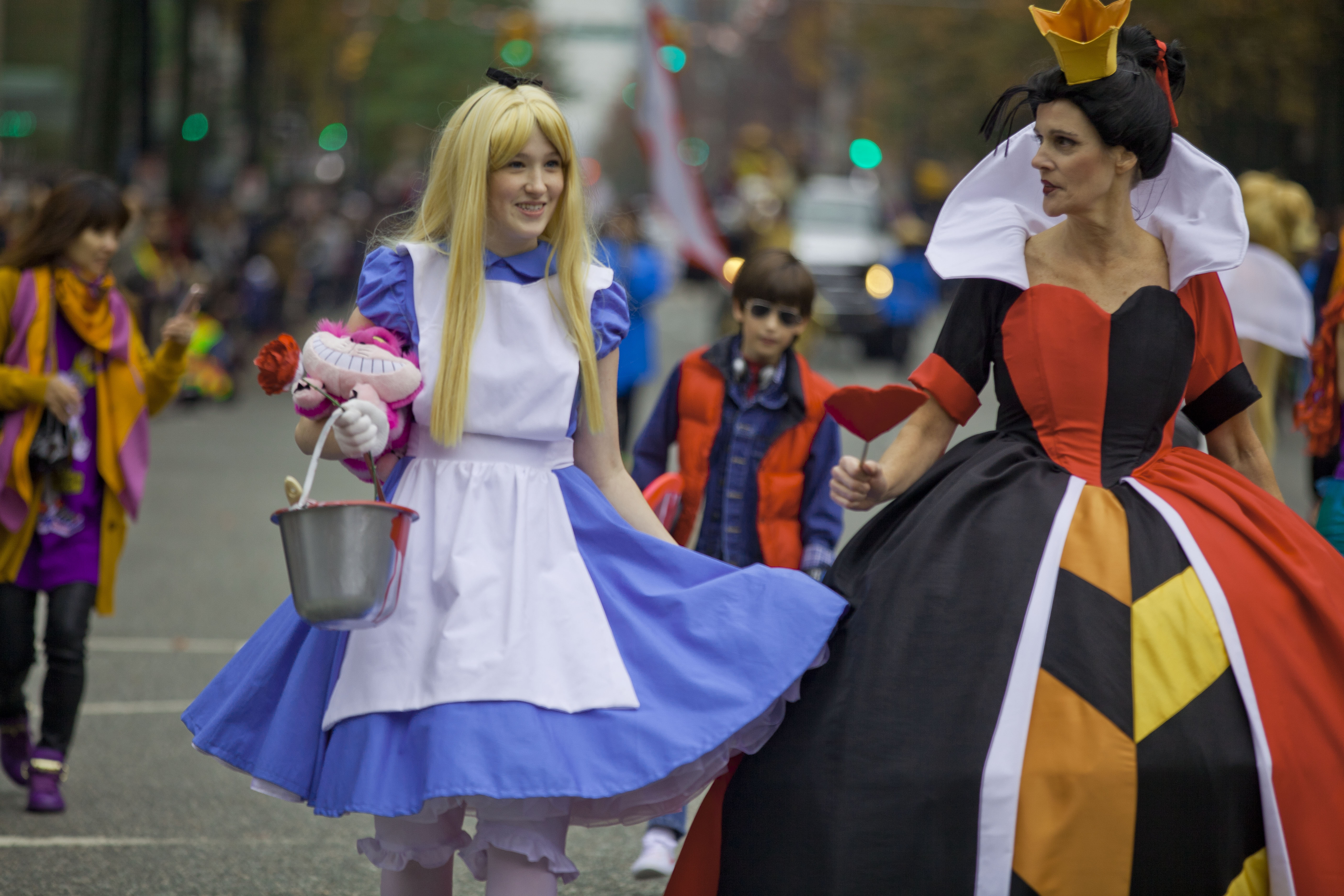
Halloween costumes of Alice and the Queen of Hearts, 2015

=== Live performance ===
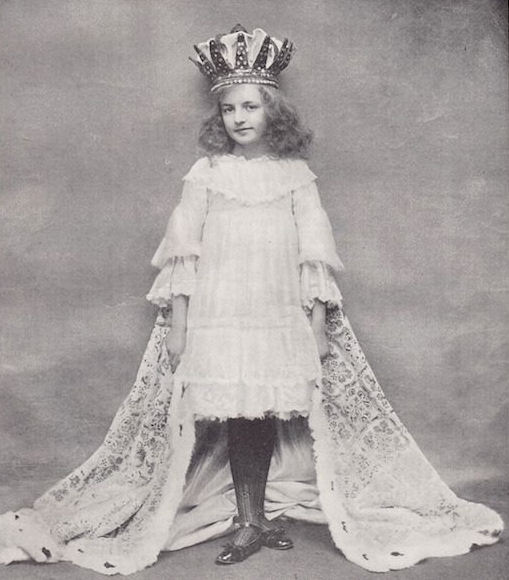
Maidie Andrews as Alice c. 1903 in the West End musical Alice in Wonderland

The first full major production was Alice in Wonderland, a musical play in London's West End by Henry Savile Clarke and Walter Slaughter, which premiered at the Prince of Wales Theatre in 1886. Twelve-year-old actress Phoebe Carlo (the first to play Alice) was personally selected by Carroll for the role. Carroll attended a performance on 30 December 1886, writing in his diary that he enjoyed it. The musical was frequently revived during West End Christmas seasons during the four decades after its premiere, including a London production at the Globe Theatre in 1888, with Isa Bowman as Alice.

As the book and its sequel are Carroll's most widely recognised works, they have also inspired numerous live performances, including plays, operas, ballets, and traditional English pantomimes. These works range from fairly faithful adaptations to those that use the story as a basis for new works. Eva Le Gallienne's stage adaptation of the Alice books premiered on 12 December 1932 and ended its run in May 1933. The production was revived in New York in 1947 and 1982. A community theatre production of Alice was Olivia de Havilland's first foray onto the stage.

A dramatisation by Herbert M. Prentice premiered at the Shakespeare Memorial Theatre, Stratford-upon-Avon in 1947, and was in turn adapted for television by John Glyn-Jones and shown by the BBC on Christmas Day 1948. The BBC screened another adaptation of Prentice's play in 1956. Joseph Papp staged Alice in Concert at the Public Theater in New York City in 1980. Elizabeth Swados wrote the book, lyrics, and music based on both Alice's Adventures in Wonderland and Through the Looking-Glass. Papp and Swados had previously produced a version of it at the New York Shakespeare Festival. Meryl Streep played Alice, the White Queen, and Humpty Dumpty. The cast also included Debbie Allen, Michael Jeter, and Mark Linn-Baker. Performed on a bare stage with the actors in modern dress, the play is a loose adaptation, with song styles ranging the globe. The 2001 Adrian Mitchell play, Alice in Wonderland and Through the Looking-Glass, commissioned by the Royal Shakespeare Company, is notable for adapting almost every scene from both books.

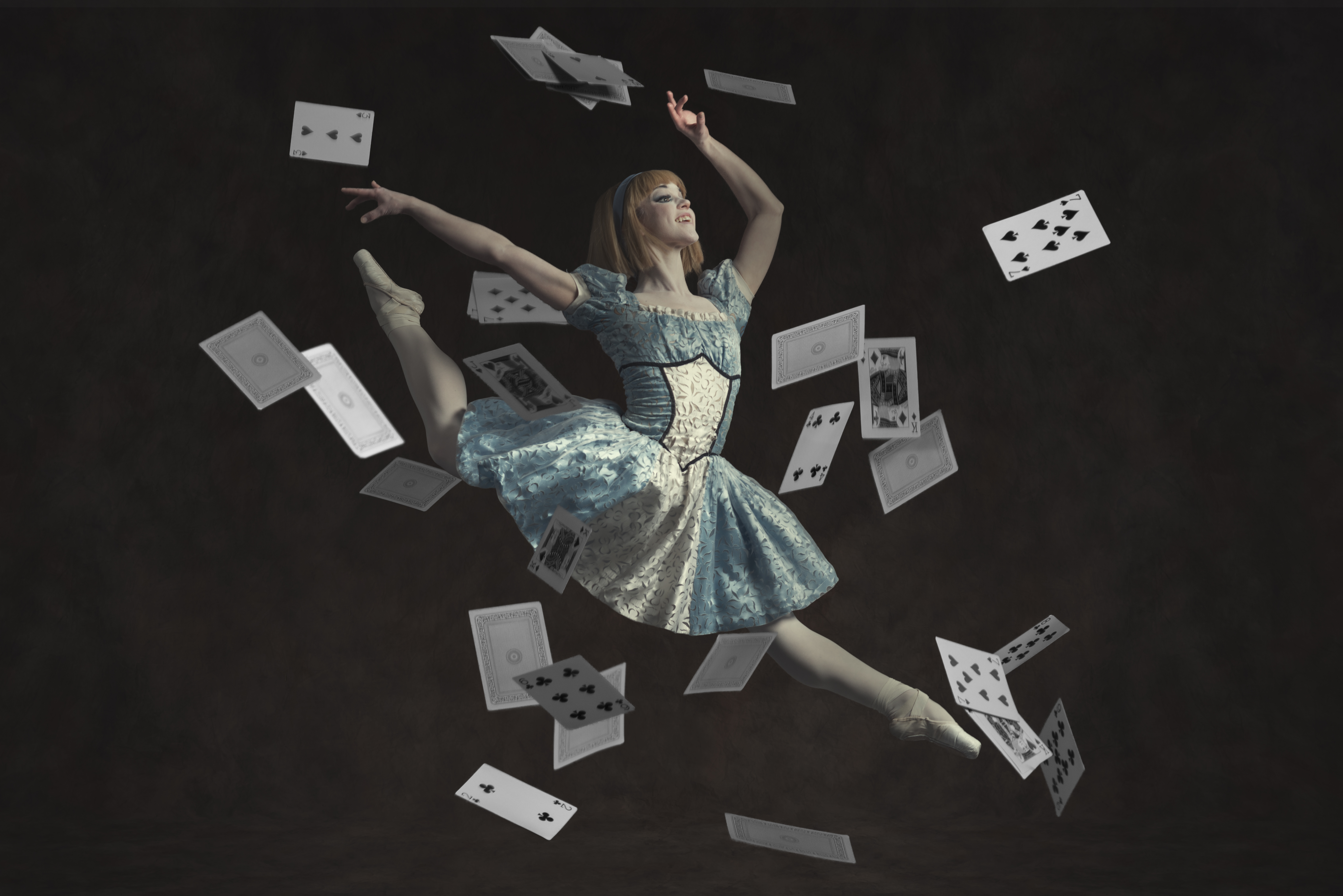
Production of Alice in Wonderland by the Kansas City Ballet in 2013

The 1992 musical theatre production Alice used both books as its inspiration. It also employs scenes with Carroll, a young Alice Liddell, and an adult Alice Liddell, to frame the story. Paul Schmidt wrote the play, with Tom Waits and Kathleen Brennan writing the music. Although the original production in Hamburg, Germany, received only a small audience, Tom Waits released the songs as the album Alice in 2002.

Joseph Horovitz composed an Alice in Wonderland ballet commissioned by the London Festival Ballet in 1953. It was performed frequently in England and the US. A ballet by Christopher Wheeldon and Nicholas Wright commissioned for the Royal Ballet entitled Alice's Adventures in Wonderland premiered in February 2011 at the Royal Opera House in London. The ballet was based on the novel Wheeldon grew up reading as a child and is generally faithful to the original story, although some critics claimed it may have been too faithful.

Unsuk Chin's opera Alice in Wonderland premiered in 2007 at the Bavarian State Opera and was hailed as World Premiere of the Year by the German opera magazine Opernwelt. Gerald Barry's 2016 one-act opera, Alice's Adventures Under Ground, first staged in 2020 at the Royal Opera House, is a conflation of the two Alice books. In 2022, the Opéra national du Rhin performed the ballet Alice, with a score by Philip Glass, in Mulhouse, France.

== Commemoration ==
Following the establishment of a memorial fund in 1932 to celebrate the centenary of Carroll's birth, characters from the book were depicted in the stained glass windows of his hometown church, All Saints', in Daresbury, Cheshire, which was dedicated in 1935. Another commemoration of Carroll's work in his home county of Cheshire is the granite sculpture The Mad Hatter's Tea Party, located in Warrington. International works based on the book include the Alice in Wonderland statue in Central Park, New York, and the Alice statue in Rymill Park, Adelaide, Australia.

In 2015, Alice characters were featured on a series of UK postage stamps issued by the Royal Mail to mark the 150th anniversary of the publication of the book. In 2021, the Royal Mint issued their first Alice's Adventures in Wonderland commemorative coin collection, including a £5 coin featuring Alice and the Cheshire Cat (inspired by Tenniel's original illustration).

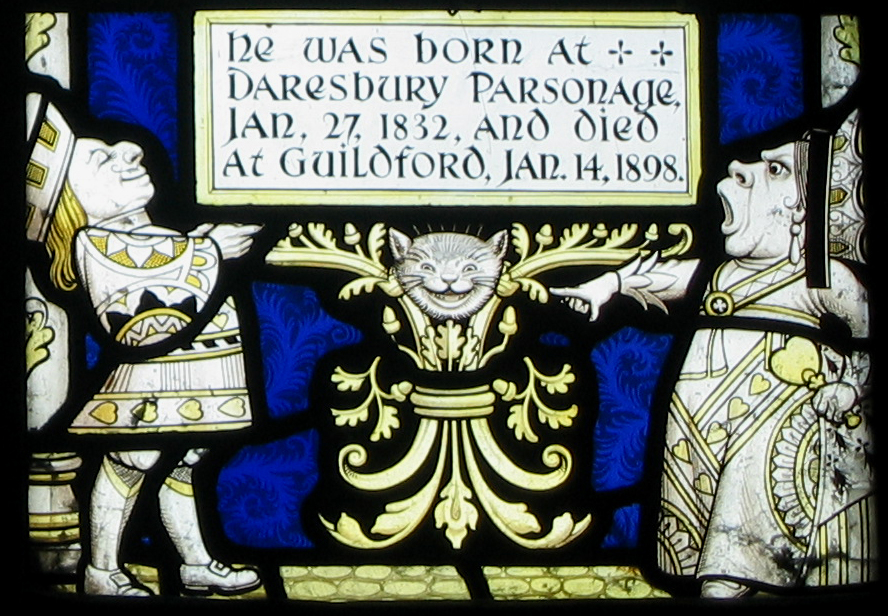
Stained glass window of Alice characters (Queen of Hearts and Knave of Hearts) in All Saints' church, Daresbury, Cheshire

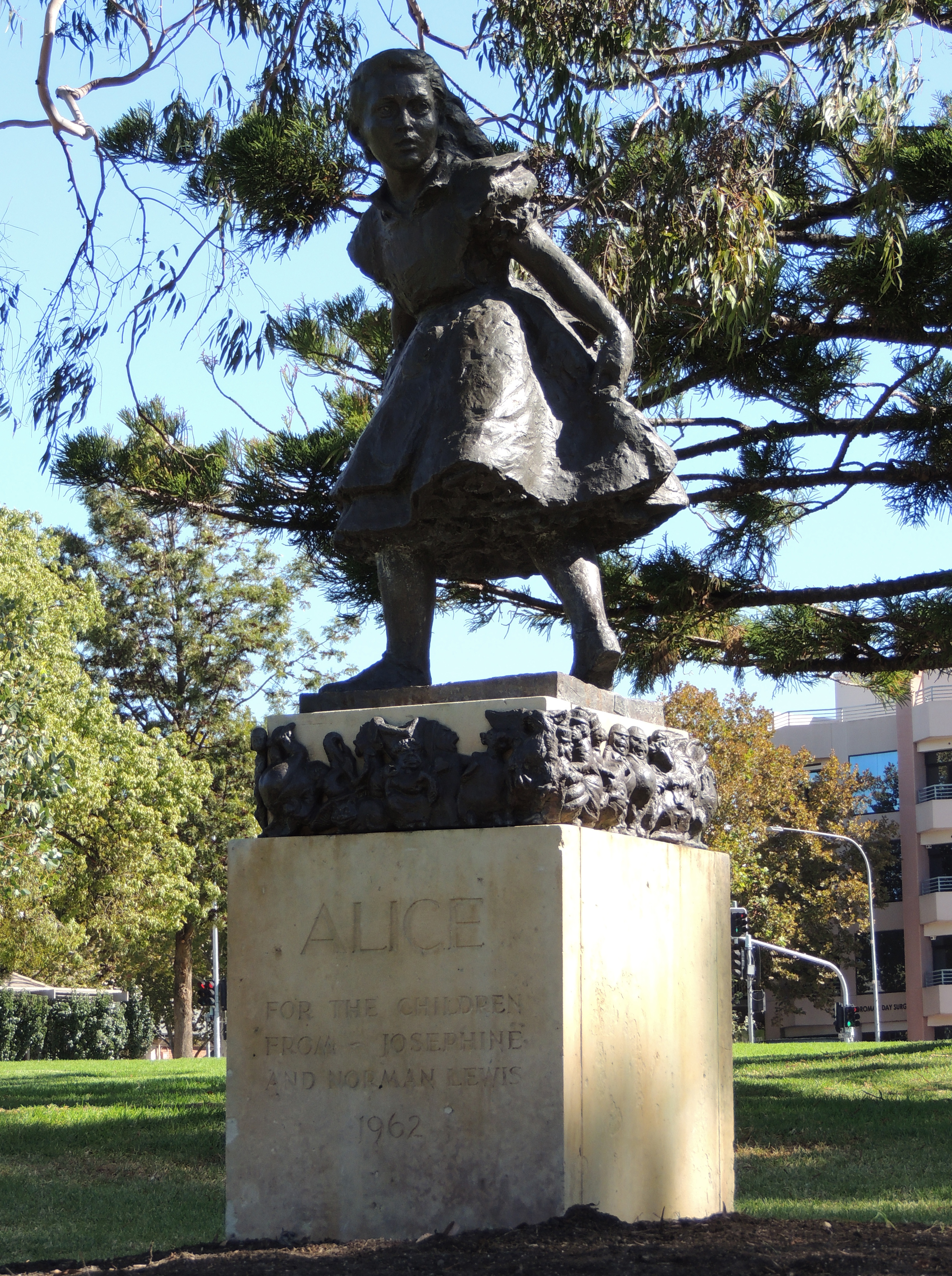
Statue of Alice in Rymill Park, Adelaide, South Australia

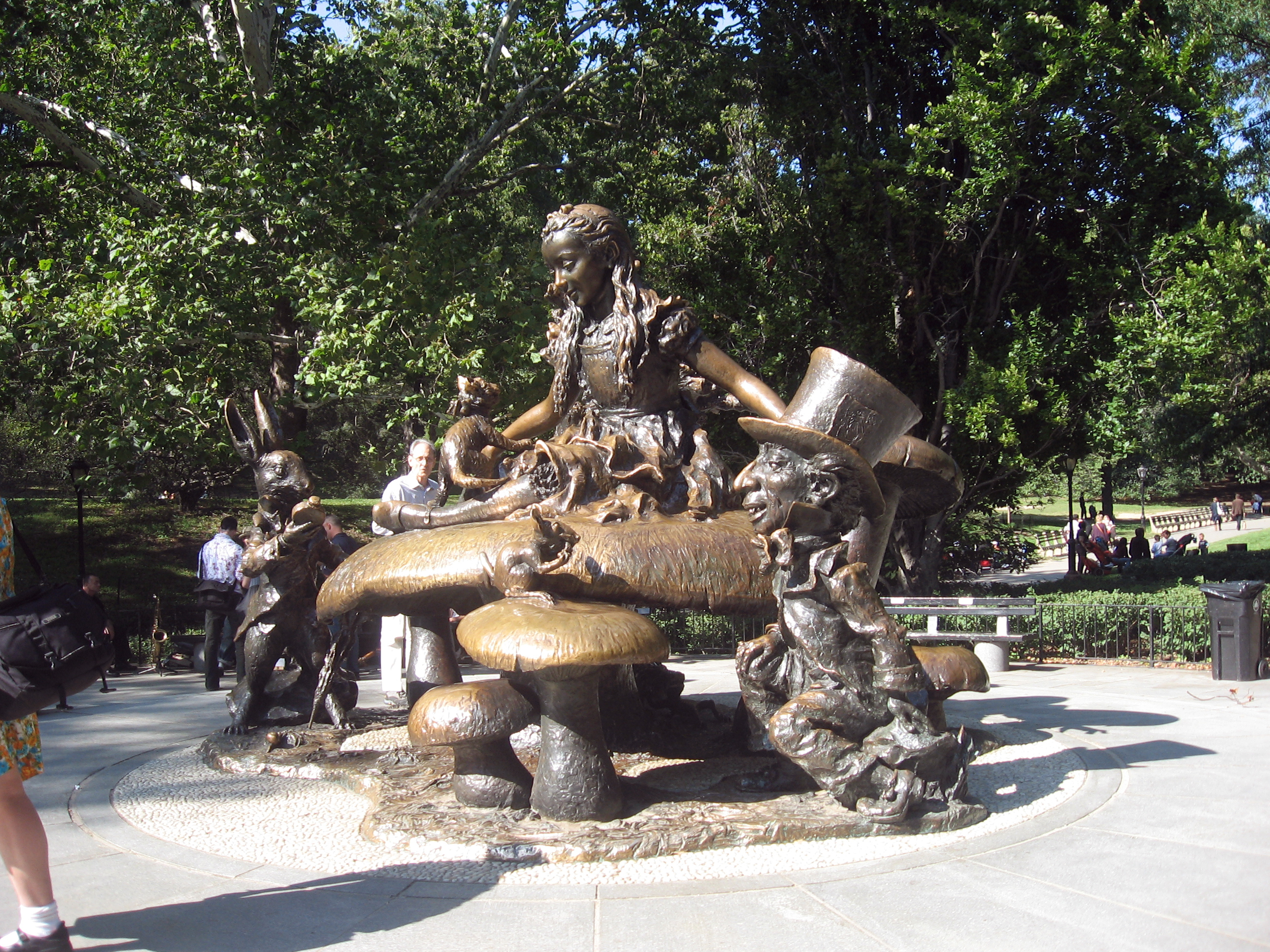
Alice in Wonderland sculpture in Central Park, New York

== See also ==
- Down the rabbit hole
- Translations of Alice's Adventures in Wonderland
- Translations of Through the Looking-Glass
