= Mad Hatter =

Alice's Adventures in Wonderland character

The Hatter
- Alice character
- The Hatter as depicted by John Tenniel, reciting his nonsensical poem, "Twinkle, Twinkle, Little Bat"
- First appearance: Alice's Adventures in Wonderland (1865)
- Last appearance: Through the Looking-Glass (1871)
- Created by: Lewis Carroll

In-universe information
- Aliases: Mad Hatter; Hatta
- Species: Human
- Gender: Male
- Occupation: Messenger, hatter
- Nationality: Wonderland, Looking-glass world
- Other versions: Tarrant Hightopp

The Hatter (called Hatta in Through the Looking-Glass) is a fictional character in Lewis Carroll's 1865 book Alice's Adventures in Wonderland and its 1871 sequel Through the Looking-Glass. He is often referred to as the Mad Hatter in adaptations and pop culture, though this term was never used by Carroll. The phrase "mad as a hatter" predates Carroll's works. The Hatter and the March Hare are described as "both mad" by the Cheshire Cat in Alice's Adventures in Wonderland.

== Fictional character biography ==
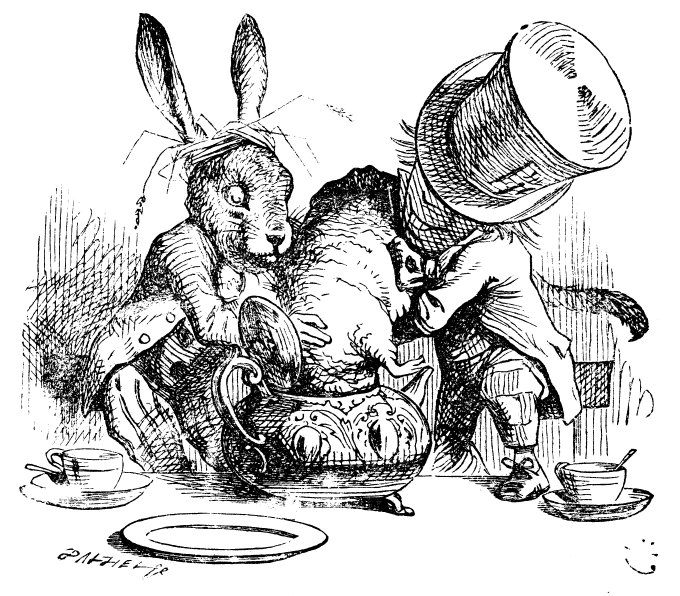
The March Hare and the Hatter put the Dormouse's head in a teapot, by Sir John Tenniel.

=== Alice's Adventures in Wonderland ===
The Hatter character, alongside all the other fictional beings, first appears in Lewis Carroll's 1865 novel Alice's Adventures in Wonderland. In "Chapter Seven – A Mad Tea-Party", while exploring Wonderland, Alice comes across the Hatter having tea with the March Hare and the Dormouse.

The Hatter tells Alice how he once always had Time on his side, but explains that now they have argued – they are always having tea because when he tried to sing for the foul-tempered Queen of Hearts, she sentenced him to death for "murdering the time", but he escapes decapitation. In retaliation, now Time (referred to as "he" by the Hatter) will not do a thing for the Hatter, keeping him trapped at 6:00 pm (aka teatime).

When Alice arrives at the tea party, the Hatter is characterised by switching places on the table at any given time, making short, personal remarks, asking unanswerable riddles, and reciting nonsensical poetry, all of which eventually drives Alice away. The Hatter appears again in "Chapter Eleven – Who Stole the Tarts?", as a witness at the Knave of Hearts' trial, where the Queen appears to recognise him as the singer she sentenced to death, and the King of Hearts also cautions him not to be nervous or he will have him "executed on the spot".

=== Through the Looking-Glass ===
The character also appears briefly in Carroll's 1871 Through the Looking-Glass, the sequel to Alice's Adventures in Wonderland. Under the name of "Hatta", the Hatter was in trouble with the law once again. He was, however, not necessarily guilty, as the White Queen explained that subjects were often punished before they commit a crime, rather than after, and sometimes they did not even commit one at all. He was also mentioned as one of the White King's messengers along with March Hare, who went under the name of "Haigha". Sir John Tenniel's illustration depicts Hatta as sipping from a teacup as he did in the original novel. Alice does not comment on whether Hatta is the Hatter of her earlier dream.

== Characterization ==
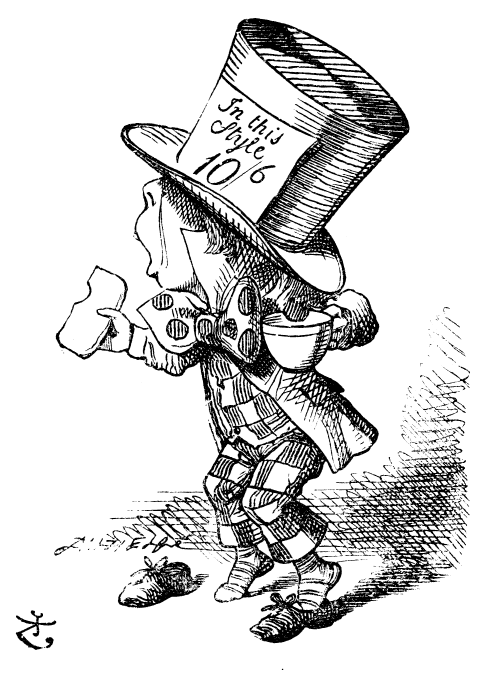
The Hatter enjoying a cup of tea and bread-and-butter, by Sir John Tenniel

=== Etymology ===
Mercury was used in the manufacturing of felt hats during the 19th century, causing a high rate of mercury poisoning among those working in the hat industry. Mercury poisoning causes neurological damage, including slurred speech, memory loss, and tremors, which led to the phrase "mad as a hatter". In the Victorian age, many workers in the textile industry, including hatters, sometimes developed illnesses affecting the nervous system, such as central nervous system (CNS) tuberculosis, which is portrayed in novels like Alton Locke by Charles Kingsley and North and South by Elizabeth Gaskell, which Lewis Carroll had read. Many such workers were sent to Pauper Lunatic Asylums, which were supervised by Lunacy Commissioners such as Samuel Gaskell and Robert Wilfred Skeffington Lutwidge, Carroll's uncle. Carroll was familiar with the conditions at asylums and visited at least one, the Surrey County Asylum, himself, which treated patients with so-called non-restraint methods and occupied them, amongst others, in gardening, farming and hat-making. Besides staging theatre plays, dances and other amusements, such asylums also held tea-parties.

=== Appearance ===
Although, during the trial of the Knave of Hearts, the King of Hearts remarks upon the Hatter's headgear, Carroll does not describe the exact style of hat he wears. The character's signature top hat comes from John Tenniel's illustrations for the first edition, in which the character wears a large top hat with a hatband reading "In this style 10/6". This is further elaborated on in The Nursery "Alice", a shortened version of Alice's Adventures in Wonderland, adapted by the author himself for young children. Here it is stated that the character is wearing a hat on his head with a price tag containing the numbers 10 and 6, giving the price in pre-decimal British money as ten shillings and six pence (or half a guinea).

=== Personality ===
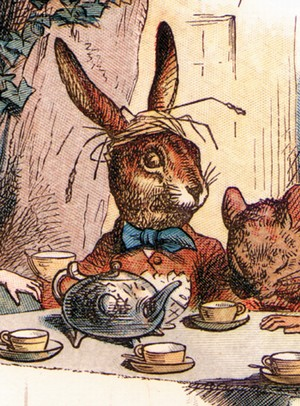
Illustration of the March Hare, one of the Hatter's tea party friends, by Sir John Tenniel

The Hatter and his tea party friend, the March Hare, are initially referred to as "both mad" by the distinctive Cheshire Cat. The first mention of both characters occurs in the sixth chapter of Carroll's Alice's Adventures in Wonderland, titled "Pig and Pepper", in a conversation between the child protagonist Alice and the Cheshire Cat, when she asks "what sort of people live about here?" to which the cat replies "in that direction lives a Hatter, and in that direction, lives a March Hare. Visit either you like: they're both mad!" Both then subsequently make their actual debuts in the seventh chapter of the same book, which is titled "A Mad Tea-Party". Alice elects to visit the March Hare (reasoning he may be less mad as it is May) but of course meets both at the Tea Party.

Hat making was the main trade in Stockport where Carroll grew up, and it was not unusual then for hatters to appear disturbed or confused; many died early as a result of mercury poisoning. However, the Hatter does not exhibit the symptoms of mercury poisoning, which include excessive timidity, increasing shyness, loss of self-confidence, anxiety, and a desire to remain unobserved and unobtrusive.

=== Resemblance to Theophilus Carter ===
It has often been claimed that the Hatter's character may have been inspired by Theophilus Carter, an eccentric furniture dealer. Carter was supposedly at one time a servitor at Christ Church, one of the University of Oxford's colleges. This is not substantiated by university records. He later owned a furniture shop, and became known as the "Mad Hatter" from his habit of standing in the door of his shop wearing a top hat. Sir John Tenniel is reported to have come to Oxford especially to sketch him for his illustrations. There is no evidence for this claim, however, in either Carroll's letters or diaries.

== Riddle ==
In the chapter "A Mad Tea Party", the Hatter asks a much-noted riddle: "Why is a raven like a writing desk?" When Alice gives up trying to figure out why, the Hatter admits "I haven't the slightest idea!" Carroll originally intended the riddle to be without an answer, but after many requests from readers, he and others—including puzzle expert Sam Loyd—suggested possible answers; in his preface to the 1896 edition of Alice's Adventures in Wonderland, Carroll wrote:

Inquiries have been so often addressed to me, as to whether any answer to the Hatter's riddle can be imagined, that I may as well put on record here what seems to me to be a fairly appropriate answer, "because it can produce a few notes, though they are very flat; and it is nevar put with the wrong end in front!" This, however, is merely an afterthought; the riddle as originally invented had no answer at all. (Note: Here, Carroll deliberately spelled the word "never" as "nevar", which is "raven" backward.)

Loyd proposed a number of alternative solutions to the riddle, including "because Poe wrote on both" (alluding to Poe's 1845 narrative poem The Raven) and "because the notes for which they are noted are not noted for being musical notes". The April 2017 edition of Bandersnatch, the Newsletter of the Lewis Carroll Society [Issue 172, ISSN 0306-8404, Apr 2017], published the following solution, proposed by puzzle expert Rick Hosburn: "Why is a Raven like a Writing-desk?" "Because one is a crow with a bill, while the other is a bureau with a quill!" The RSPB, in its definition of Raven, states: "The raven [...] is all black with a large bill, and long wings." American author Stephen King provides an alternative answer to the Hatter's riddle in his 1977 horror novel The Shining. Snowbound and isolated in the Rocky Mountains, Danny Torrance hears whispers of the malign "voice of the [Overlook] hotel" inside his head, including this bit of mockery: "Why is a raven like a writing desk? The higher the fewer, of course! Have another cup of tea!"

Other proposed answers include; "because one has flapping fits and the other fitting flaps"; "because one is good for writing books and the other better for biting rooks"; and "because a writing desk is a rest for pens and a raven is a pest for wrens".

== In popular culture ==
The Hatter has been featured in nearly every adaptation of Alice in Wonderland to date; he is usually the male lead despite being a supporting character. The character has been portrayed in film by Norman Whitten, Edward Everett Horton, Sir Robert Helpmann, Martin Short, Peter Cook, Anthony Newley, Ed Wynn, Andrew-Lee Potts, Johnny Depp, and Miloš Biković. In music videos, the Hatter has been portrayed by Tom Petty, Dero Goi, and Steven Tyler. He has also been portrayed on stage by Nikki Snelson, Wesley Taylor, and Katherine Shindle, and on television by John Robert Hoffman, Pip Donaghy and Sebastian Stan. In ballet adaptations, Steven McRae also portrayed him as a mad 'Tapper'. In March 2019, Chelsy Meiss became the first female soloist to play the Mad Hatter for the National Ballet of Canada.

=== Films ===
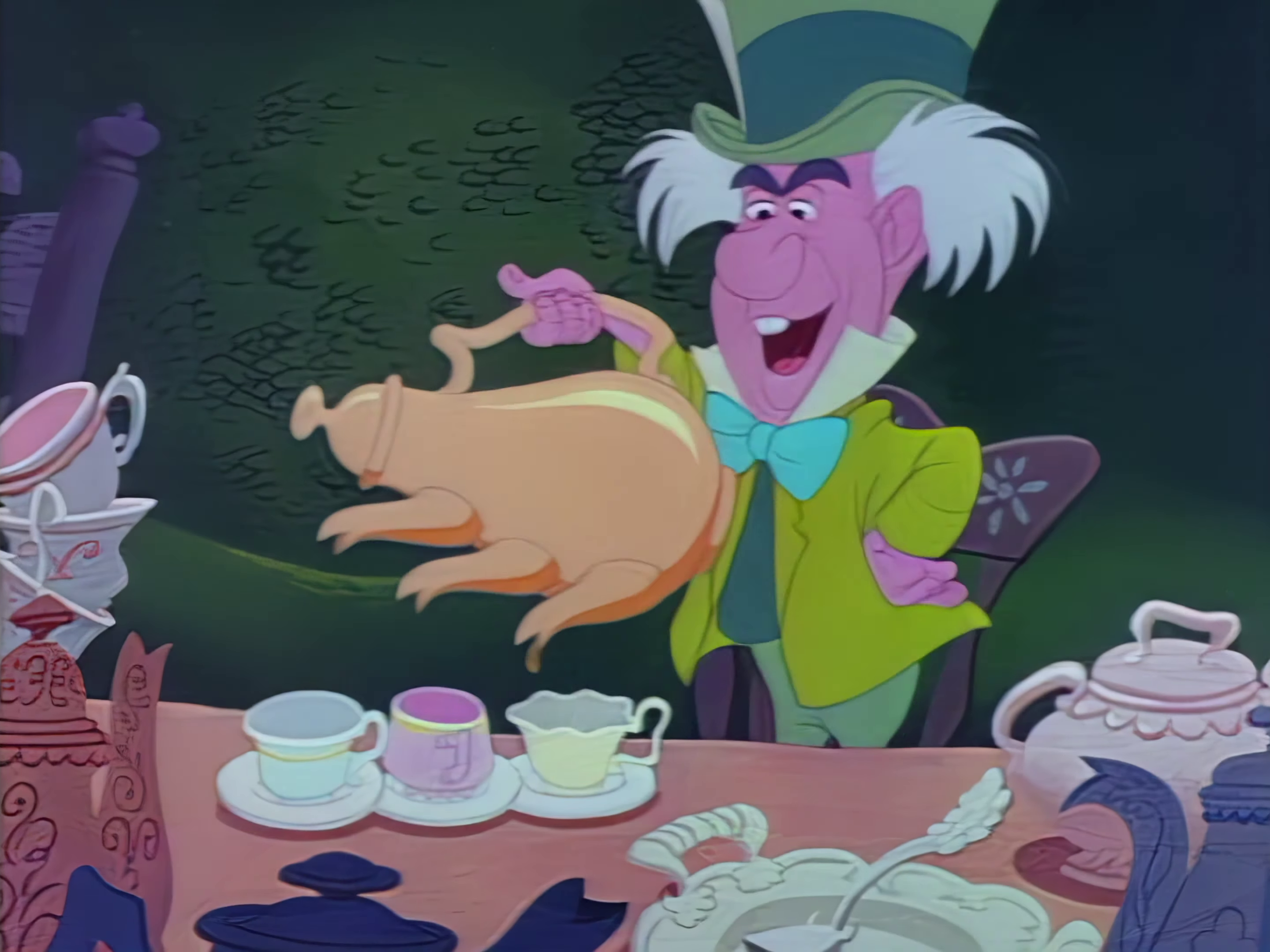
The Mad Hatter from the 1951 animated film

- In the 1951 Walt Disney animated feature Alice in Wonderland, the Hatter, referred to by others as "The Mad Hatter", appears as a short, hyperactive man with grey hair, a large nose and a comical voice. He was voiced by Ed Wynn in 1951, and by Corey Burton in his later appearances (Bonkers, House of Mouse), while Alan Tudyk voices him in the short film Once Upon a Studio. Alice stumbles upon the Hatter and the March Hare having an "un-birthday" party for themselves. The Hatter asks her the infamous riddle "why is a raven like a writing desk?", but when she tries to answer, the Hatter and the March Hare think she is "stark raving mad", completely forgetting that he asked her the riddle. Throughout the course of the film, the Hatter pulls numerous items out of his hat, such as cake and smaller hats. His personality is that of a child; angry one second, happy the next.
- Martin Short portrays the Mad Hatter in the 1999 television film Alice in Wonderland. In this adaptation the character is an imaginary counterpart in Alice's dream of one of the attendees at her family's party, who is a man who also wears a top hat and drinks tea. The Mad Hatter performs a bizarre parody of "Twinkle Twinkle Little Star", just like the character does in the novel, and mentions that he once sang the same piece during the Queen's concert but was sent away because she was offended by his performance. He also performs along with the March Hare a song called "Auntie's Wooden Leg".
- The Hatter appears in Tim Burton's 2010 version of Alice in Wonderland, portrayed by Johnny Depp and given the name Tarrant Hightopp. In the film, the Hatter takes Alice toward the White Queen's castle and relates the terror of the Red Queen's reign while commenting that Alice is not the same as she once was. The Hatter subsequently helps Alice avoid capture by the Red Queen's guards by allowing himself to be seized instead. He is later saved from execution by the Cheshire Cat and calls for rebellion against the Red Queen. Near the end of the film, the Hatter unsuccessfully suggests to Alice that she could stay in Wonderland and consummate his feelings for her. Critical reception to Johnny Depp's portrayal of the Hatter was generally positive. David Edelstein of New York Magazine remarked that while the elements of the character suggested by Depp don't entirely come together, "Depp brings an infectious summer-stock zest to everything he does." Bill Goodykoontz of The Arizona Republic said that "Depp is exactly what you'd expect, which is a good thing. Gap-toothed and leering, at times he looks like Madonna after sticking a fork in a toaster. How he finds his characters is anybody's guess, a sort of thrift-store warehouse of eccentricities, it seems like. But it works." Owen Gleiberman of Entertainment Weekly had a more mixed opinion and commented that Depp as the Hatter is "a fantastic image, but once Depp opens his mouth, what comes out is a noisome Scottish brogue that makes everything he says sound more or less the same. The character offers no captivatingly skewed bat-house psychology. There isn't much to him, really—he's just a smiling Johnny one-note with a secret hip-hop dance move—and so we start to react to him the way that Alice does to everything else: by wondering when he's going to stop making nonsense." Kenneth Turan of Los Angeles Times stated that "there's no denying Depp's gifts and abilities, but this performance feels both indulgent and something we've all seen before."
- The Mad Hatter appears in Come Away, portrayed by Clarke Peters. This version is the father of Captain Hook, the grandfather of Alice and Peter Pan, and the great-grandfather of Wendy Darling, John Darling, and Michael Darling.
- The Mad Hatter is voiced by Mawaan Rizwan in the 2024 animated movie The Night Before Christmas in Wonderland.
- A combined Hatter and Dormouse analogue appears in the 2021 satire film Alice, Through the Looking, played by Steven Berkoff. This version of the character is an "executive producer" who views the director character, Adam's finished film, which is inspired by the Alice books. Instead of properly commenting on the film, over coffee, the Executive Producer tells an absurd story (similar to the Dormouse's in the original text) about 3 sons fighting over a pair of glasses.
- The Mad Hatter appears in the 2025 Russian adaptation, portrayed by Miloš Biković. This version is the double of Alice's real life father.
- A horror iteration of The Mad Hatter will appear in The Twisted Childhood Universe film Poohniverse: Monsters Assemble as one of the film's primary villains, alongside Peter Pan and Mary Poppins. The character will additionally appear in a standalone film Alice & The Mad Hatter. The film will centre around the character becoming obsessed with the franchise's version of Alice, an escort for an agency named The White Rabbit.
- An animated film based on the character, helmed by director Scott Mosier, entered development at Amazon MGM Studios by July 2026.

=== Television ===
- The Disney incarnation of the Mad Hatter appears in Bonkers and House of Mouse, voiced by Corey Burton in both appearances.
- The Mad Hatter appears in Alice, portrayed by Andrew-Lee Potts. This version is a smuggler who starts off working as a double agent for the Queen of Hearts and the Wonderland Resistance in the story; over the course of the story, he begins to side more and more with the Resistance, and ends up falling in love with Alice as he helps her along the way.
- The Mad Hatter appears in Once Upon a Time, portrayed by Sebastian Stan.

=== Video games ===
- In the 2000 video game American McGee's Alice, the Mad Hatter is portrayed as psychotic, literally gone "mad" and obsessed with time and clockworks, and considers himself to be a genius. He invents mechanical devices, often evidently using the bodies of living organisms for the base of his inventions, as he plans to do to all of Wonderland's inhabitants. He appears in the 2011 sequel Alice: Madness Returns in the same appearance, although this time, he requests Alice's help in retrieving his lost limbs from his former compatriots the March Hare and Dormouse.
- The Disney incarnation of the Mad Hatter appears in the 2000 video game based on the film. He also appears in the Kingdom Hearts series, first appearing in a cameo in a painting depicted in Kingdom Hearts (2002) and Kingdom Hearts 358/2 Days (2009) before making a physical appearance in Kingdom Hearts χ (2013). Other appearances in Disney video games include Kinect: Disneyland Adventures, Disney Magical World, Disney Magic Kingdoms, and Disney Speedstorm.
- The Mad Hatter appears in the Sunsoft's 2006 mobile game Alice's Warped Wonderland (歪みの国のアリス, Yugami no kuni no Arisu; Alice in Distortion World). He is portrayed as a middle-school age boy in oversized clothes and a large hat that covers his whole head. Unlike most Wonderland residents, he acts rather bratty and rude to Ariko (the "Alice" of the game). In one of the bad endings, Mad Hatter is killed by the Cheshire Cat.
- In the 2018 eroge game Black Souls II, the Mad Hatter is portrayed as a young girl in a moe style.
- The Hatter takes on the role of narrator, guiding players through a detective quest based on Alice's Adventures in Wonderland in Sherlock: Hidden Match-3 Cases, developed by G5 Entertainment in 2020.

=== Music ===
- The song "Mad Hatter" by an American garage rock band Shag was inspired by the character. It appeared on their self-titled album in 1969.
- Sir John Tenniel's drawing of the Hatter, combined with a montage of other images from Alice in Wonderland, were used as a logo by Charisma Records from 1972 onwards.
- The Mad Hatter's name is used in Elton John's 1972 song "Mona Lisas and Mad Hatters".
- The Mad Hatter is referenced to in the eponymous 2015 song by Melanie Martinez, alongside several other characters from Carroll's Alice in Wonderland.

=== Live performance ===
- In 1887, the Alice books were adapted for stage by Savile Clarke. Lewis Carol wrote a review he called ""Alice" on the Stage". He singled out for praise "the Hatter" played by Sydney Harcourt (who also played Tweedledum), saying "To see him enact the Hatter was a weird and uncanny thing, as though some grotesque monster, last seen in a dream, should walk into a room in broad daylight and quietly say "Good Morning!" I need not try to describe what I ment the Hatter to be, since, as far as I can now remember, it was exactly what Mr. Harcourt has now made him: and I may say nearly the same about Tweedledum: but the Hatter surprised me most-perhaps only because it came first in the play."
- The Disney incarnation of the Mad Hatter appears as a meet-and-greet character at the Disneyland Resort, Walt Disney World Resort, Tokyo Disney Resort, Disneyland Paris and Hong Kong Disneyland Resort.
- In Shrek The Musical, the Mad Hatter plays a small role as a fairytale creature (replacing the Gnome) and has two lines in songs including "They ridiculed my hat" and "I smell like sauerkraut".
- Frank Wildhorn composed the music to and co-wrote the music to Wonderland: A New Alice. In this adaption the Hatter is portrayed as a female, the villain of the story, and Alice's alter-ego and is a mad woman who longs to be Queen. She was played by Nikki Snelson in the original Tampa, Florida production, and then by Kate Shindle in the Tampa/Houston Tour, and the production on Broadway.
- The Mad Hatter appears in the 2012 musical Alice By Heart by Duncan Sheik, Steven Sater, and Jessie Nelson. The character outside of Wonderland is called Harold Pudding, and has been notably played by Alex Brightman and Wesley Taylor.
- In the 2015 Cbeebies Pantomime, the Mad Hatter (here just called the Hatter) is played by Andy Day, who got top male billing in promotional material. He first appears at the tea party, which is also attended by the March Hare, the Dormouse, the White Rabbit and Alice herself. They play the game and sing the song "Ring Around the Table". He later appears at the Queen of Hearts' Garden Party where he competed in the Croquet game (alongside the Queen and the Duchess); he hit the hedgehog but missed the hoop.

=== Comic strips and books ===
- The Mad Hatter (Jervis Tetch) is a supervillain and enemy of Batman in the DC Comics universe, first appearing in Batman #49 (October 1948). He is portrayed as a brilliant neurotechnician with considerable knowledge in controlling the human mind. Tetch is obsessed with Lewis Carroll's books and believes himself to be the reincarnation of the Mad Hatter.
- A spin-off of the traditional Alice in Wonderland story, Frank Beddor's The Looking Glass Wars features a character named Hatter Madigan, a member of an elite group of bodyguards known in Wonderland as the "Millinery" after the business of selling women's hats. He acts as the bodyguard of the rightful Queen, and as guide/guardian to the protagonist, Alyss Heart.
- The Mad Hatter in the Pandora Hearts manga series is a chain (creature from the Abyss) that was contracted by Xerxes Break. The hatter resembles a large top hat with flowery decorations (similar to Break's top hat) and a tattered cape. When summoned, it destroys chains and objects from the Abyss within a large area.
- The Japanese manga Alice in the Country of Hearts has been translated into English. The Hatter role is played by Blood Dupre, a crime boss and leader of a street gang called The Hatters, which controls one of the four territories of Wonderland.
- The book Heartless by Marissa Meyer, a retelling of the Queen of Hearts and her adolescence, showcases the Mad Hatter as a character named Hatta, who is a travelling hat maker and salesman and the owner of Hatta's Marvelous Millinery. He is a supporting character in the novel.

=== Other ===
- The doll line Ever After High includes Madeline Hatter, who is Mad Hatter's daughter.

== See also ==
- March Hare
- Dormouse

== Sources ==
- Collingwood, Stuart (2011). The Life and Letters of Lewis Carroll. Cambridge University. ISBN 978-1108033886.
- Hancher, Michael (1985). The Tenniel Illustrations to the "Alice" Books. Ohio State University. ISBN 978-0814204085.
- Myers, Richard (2003). The Basics of Chemistry. Greenwood Publishing Group. ISBN 978-0313316647.
