= Robert Douglas-Fairhurst =

British literary scholar and author

Robert Douglas-Fairhurst is a British author. He is professor of English Literature at Magdalen College, Oxford.

He is a fellow of the Royal Society of Literature.

== Books ==
- Victorian Afterlives: The Shaping of Influence in Nineteenth-Century Literature (Oxford University Press, 2002)
- Becoming Dickens: The Invention of a Novelist (Harvard University Press, 2011)
- The Story of Alice: Lewis Carroll and the Secret History of Wonderland (Harvill Secker; Harvard University Press, 2015)
- The Turning Point: A Year in the Life of Charles Dickens (Jonathan Cape/Alfred A. Knopf, 2021)
- Metamorphosis: A Life in Pieces (Jonathan Cape, 2023)
- Look Closer: How to Get More Out of Reading (Vintage, 2025)
- (ed.) A Christmas Carol and Other Christmas Books (Oxford World's Classics, 2006)
- (ed.) Great Expectations (Oxford World's Classics, 2008)
- (ed. with Seamus Perry) Tennyson Among the Poets: Bicentenary Essays (Oxford University Press, 2009)
- (ed.) London Labour and the London Poor: A Selected Edition (Oxford World's Classics, 2010)
- (ed.) The Water-Babies (Oxford World's Classics, 2013)
- (ed.) The Collected Peter Pan (Oxford World's Classics, 2019)
- (ed.) A Tale of Two Cities (Norton, 2019)
