= An Ideal Husband =

Play by Oscar Wilde

Act II: Mrs Cheveley, centre, denounces Sir Robert Chiltern to his wife, 1895 premiere

An Ideal Husband is a four-act play by Oscar Wilde that revolves around blackmail and political corruption, and touches on the themes of public and private honour. It was first produced at the Haymarket Theatre, London in 1895 and ran for 124 performances. It has been revived in many theatre productions and adapted for the cinema, radio and television.

== Background and first production ==
Lewis Waller as Sir Robert Chiltern

In June 1893, with his second drawing room play, A Woman of No Importance, running successfully at the Haymarket Theatre, Oscar Wilde began writing An Ideal Husband for the actor-manager John Hare. He completed the first act while staying at a house he had taken in Goring-on-Thames, after which he named a leading character in the play along with other characters from the surrounding area. Between September 1893 and January 1894 he wrote the remaining three acts. Hare rejected the play, finding the last act unsatisfactory; Wilde then successfully offered the play to Lewis Waller, who was about to take temporary charge of the Haymarket in the absence in America of its usual manager, Herbert Beerbohm Tree.

The play was put into rehearsal in December 1894 and opened on 3 January 1895, billed as "A new and original play of modern life". It ran at the Haymarket for 111 performances, regarded as a good run at the time. (Note: According to Who's Who in the Theatre an average of 12 new productions a year ran in the West End for more than 100 performances in the decade 1890 to 1899, including plays, operettas, burlesques and other genres.) In April, on the last day of the Haymarket run, Wilde was arrested for gross indecency; his name was removed from the playbills and programmes when the production transferred to the Criterion Theatre, where it ran for a further 13 performances, from 13 to 27 April. The play could have run longer at the Criterion, but the theatre was required by its proprietor, Charles Wyndham, for a new production.

The play was published in 1899 in an edition of 1000 copies; Wilde's name was not printed: the work was published as "By the author of Lady Windermere's Fan". It is dedicated to Frank Harris, "A slight tribute to his power and distinction as an artist, his chivalry and nobility as a friend." The published version differs slightly from the performed play, as Wilde added many passages and cut others. Prominent additions included written stage directions and character descriptions. Wilde was a leader in the effort to make plays accessible to the reading public.

== Original cast ==
1895 programme

- The Earl of Caversham, KG – Alfred Bishop
- Viscount Goring (his son) – Charles Hawtrey
- Sir Robert Chiltern (under-secretary for foreign affairs) – Lewis Waller
- Vicomte de Nanjac (attaché at the French embassy in London) – Cosmo Stuart
- Mr Montford – Henry Stanford
- Phipps (Lord Goring's servant) – Charles Brookfield
- Mason (butler to Sir Robert Chiltern) – H. Deane
- James (footman at Lord Goring's) – Charles Meyrick
- Harold (footman at Sir Robert Chiltern's) – Charles Goodhart
- Lady Chiltern – Julia Neilson
- Lady Markby – Fanny Brough
- Countess of Basildon – Vane Featherston
- Mrs Marchmont – Helen Forsyth
- Miss Mabel Chiltern (Sir Robert's sister) – Maude Millett
- Mrs Cheveley – Florence West

== Plot ==
=== Act I ===
The Octagon Room in Sir Robert Chiltern's house in Grosvenor Square

Lord Caversham, Mabel Chiltern and Lord Goring, 1895 premiere

Sir Robert – a member of the House of Commons and junior government minister – and his wife, Lady Chiltern, are hosting a gathering that includes his friend Lord Goring, a dandified bachelor, Chiltern's sister Mabel and other guests. During the party, Mrs Cheveley, an enemy of Lady Chiltern from their schooldays, attempts to blackmail Sir Robert into supporting a fraudulent scheme to build a canal in Argentina. Her late mentor and lover, Baron Arnheim, induced the young Chiltern to sell him a Cabinet secret – which enabled Arnheim to buy shares in the Suez Canal Company three days before the British government announced its purchase of the company. Arnheim's payoff was the basis of Sir Robert's fortune, and Mrs Cheveley has Robert's letter to Arnheim as proof of his crime. Fearing the ruin of both career and marriage, Sir Robert submits to her demands. When Mrs Cheveley pointedly informs Lady Chiltern of Sir Robert's change of heart regarding the canal scheme, the morally inflexible Lady Chiltern, unaware of both her husband's past and the blackmail plot, insists that Sir Robert renege on his promise to Mrs Cheveley. For Lady Chiltern, their marriage is predicated on her having an "ideal husband"—that is, a model spouse in both private and public life whom she can worship; thus, Sir Robert must remain unimpeachable in all his decisions. Sir Robert complies with her wishes and apparently seals his doom.

Toward the end of Act I, Mabel and Lord Goring come upon a diamond brooch that Goring gave someone many years ago. He takes the brooch and asks Mabel to tell him if anyone comes to retrieve it.

=== Act II ===
Morning room in Sir Robert Chiltern's house

Goring urges Chiltern to fight Mrs Cheveley and admit his guilt to his wife. He also reveals that he and Mrs Cheveley were once engaged. After finishing his conversation with Chiltern, Goring engages in flirtatious banter with Mabel. He also takes Lady Chiltern aside and obliquely urges her to be less morally inflexible and more forgiving. Once Goring leaves, Mrs Cheveley appears, unexpected, in search of a brooch she lost the previous evening. Incensed at Chiltern's reneging on his promise, she exposes him to his wife. Lady Chiltern denounces her husband and refuses to forgive him.

=== Act III ===
The library of Lord Goring's house in Curzon Street

Lord Goring burns the incriminating letter

Goring receives a letter from Lady Chiltern asking for his help – a letter that could be misinterpreted as a compromising love note. Just as Goring receives this note, his father, Lord Caversham, drops in and demands to know when his son will marry. A visit from Chiltern, who seeks further counsel from Goring, follows. Meanwhile, Mrs Cheveley arrives unexpectedly and, misrecognised by the butler as the woman Goring awaits, is ushered into Lord Goring's drawing room. While she waits, she finds Lady Chiltern's letter. Chiltern discovers Mrs Cheveley in the drawing room and, convinced of an affair between these two former lovers, he storms out of the house.

When Mrs Cheveley and Lord Goring confront each other, she makes a proposal. Claiming to still love Goring from their early days of courtship, she offers to exchange Chiltern's letter for her old beau's hand in marriage. Lord Goring declines, accusing her of defiling love by reducing courtship to a vulgar transaction and ruining the Chilterns' marriage. He then springs his trap. Removing the diamond brooch from his desk drawer, he binds it to Cheveley's wrist with a hidden lock. Goring then reveals how the item came into her possession: she stole it from his cousin, Mary Berkshire, years ago. To avoid arrest, Cheveley must trade the incriminating letter for her release from the bejewelled handcuff. After Goring obtains and burns the letter, Mrs Cheveley steals Lady Chiltern's note from his desk. Vengefully she plans to send it to Chiltern as, ostensibly, a love letter from Lady Chiltern to Goring. Mrs Cheveley exits the house in triumph.

=== Act IV ===
Morning room in Sir Robert Chiltern's house (same as act ii)

Lord Goring proposes to and is accepted by Mabel. Lord Caversham tells his son that Chiltern has denounced the Argentine canal scheme in the House of Commons. Lady Chiltern appears, and Lord Goring tells her that Chiltern's letter has been destroyed but that Mrs Cheveley has stolen her note and plans to use it to destroy her marriage. At that moment, Chiltern enters while reading Lady Chiltern's letter, but as the letter does not have the name of the addressee, he assumes it is meant for him, and reads it as a letter of forgiveness. The two are reconciled. Lady Chiltern initially agrees to support Chiltern's decision to renounce his career in politics, but Goring dissuades her from allowing her husband to resign. When Chiltern refuses Goring his sister's hand in marriage, still believing he has taken up with Mrs Cheveley, Lady Chiltern is forced to explain last night's events and the true nature of the letter. Chiltern relents, and Goring and Mabel are permitted to marry. Lady Chiltern reaffirms her love for her husband and says, "For both of us a new life is beginning".

== Reception ==
In The Pall Mall Gazette, H. G. Wells wrote of the play:

It is not excellent; indeed, after Lady Windermere's Fan and The Woman of No Importance, it is decidedly disappointing. But worse have succeeded, and it was at least excellently received. ... But, taking it seriously, and disregarding any possibly imaginary tendency towards a new width of treatment, the play is unquestionably very poor.

William Archer wrote, "An Ideal Husband is a very able and entertaining piece of work, charmingly written, wherever Mr. Wilde can find it in his heart to sufflaminate his wit. There are several scenes in which the dialogue is heavily overburdened with witticisms, not always of the best alloy. ... An Ideal Husband, however, does not positively lack good things, but simply suffers from a disproportionate profusion of inferior chatter." A. B. Walkley called the play "a strepitous, polychromatic, scintillant affair, dexterous as a conjurer's trick of legerdemain, clever with a cleverness so excessive as to be almost monstrous and uncanny". He found the plot unbelievable, and thought that although the play, "by sheer cleverness, keeps one continually amused and interested", Wilde's work was "not only poor and sterile, but essentially vulgar". George Bernard Shaw praised the play: "In a certain sense Mr Wilde is to me our only thorough playwright. He plays with everything: with wit, with philosophy, with drama, with actors and audience, with the whole theatre. Such a feat scandalizes the Englishman...".

In 1996 the critic Bindon Russell wrote that An Ideal Husband is "the most autobiographical of Wilde's plays, mirroring, as it does, his own situation of a double life and an incipient scandal with the emergence of terrible secrets. Whilst Lord Goring is a character with much of Wilde's own wit, insight and compassion, Gertrude Chiltern can be seen as a portrait of Constance [Wilde]".

== Production history ==
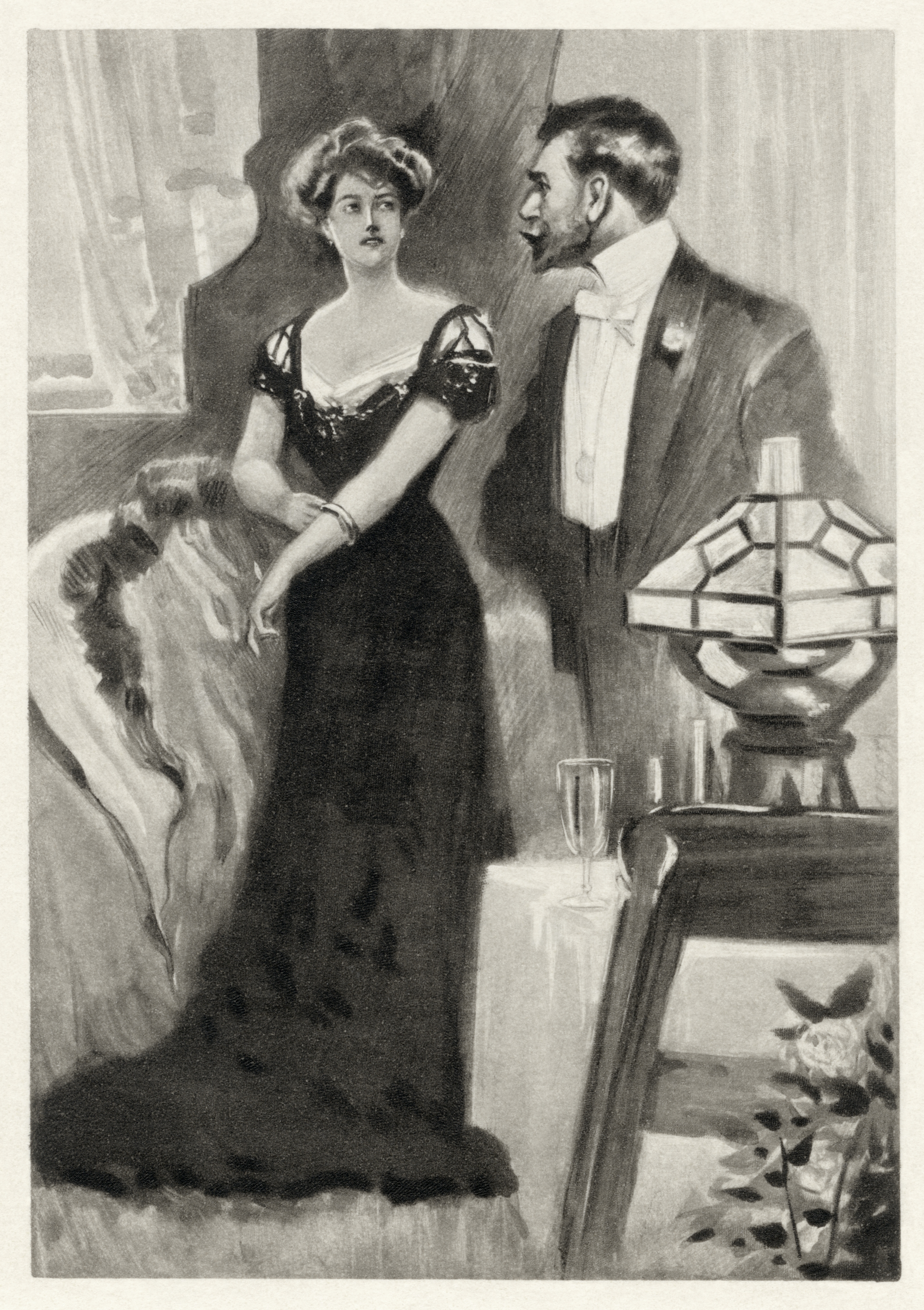
Lord Goring confronts Mrs Cheveley. From a 1901 collected edition of Wilde's work

=== Britain ===
The first West End revival was presented by George Alexander in May 1914 at the St James's Theatre, and featured Arthur Wontner as Sir Robert Chiltern, Phyllis Neilson-Terry as Lady Chiltern, Hilda Moore as Mrs Cheveley and Alexander as Lord Goring. The play was next staged in London at the Westminster Theatre in 1943–44, with Manning Whiley as Sir Robert Chiltern, Rosemary Scott as Lady Chiltern, Martita Hunt as Mrs Cheveley, Roland Culver as Lord Goring and Irene Vanbrugh as Lady Markby, set design by Rex Whistler.

A London revival in 1965–66 ran at three West End theatres in succession; it starred Michael Denison as Sir Robert Chiltern, Dulcie Gray as Lady Chiltern, Margaret Lockwood as Mrs Cheveley and Richard Todd as Lord Goring. The play was again seen at the Westminster in 1989 in a short-lived revival, and in 1992 a new production was presented at the Globe Theatre which was subsequently seen in four other London theatres and on Broadway between November 1992 and March 1999. It was directed by Peter Hall, and the original cast featured David Yelland as Sir Robert Chiltern, Hannah Gordon as Lady Chiltern, Anna Carteret as Mrs Cheveley, Martin Shaw as Lord Goring, Michael Denison as Lord Caversham and Dulcie Gray as Lady Markby. The various stagings of the production ran for an aggregate three years, the longest running production of a Wilde play. (Note: The longest continuously running Wilde production was John Gielgud's 1945 production of Lady Windermere's Fan which run for 18 months at the Haymarket.)

A production at the Vaudeville Theatre, London in 2010–11 featured Alexander Hanson as Sir Robert Chiltern, Rachael Stirling as Lady Chiltern, Samantha Bond as Mrs Cheveley and Elliot Cowan. A revival at the same theatre in 2018 featured Nathaniel Parker and Sally Bretton as the Chilterns, the father and son combination of Edward Fox as Lord Caversham and Freddie Fox as Lord Goring, and Frances Barber as Mrs Cheveley, and Susan Hampshire as Lady Markby.

=== International ===
The play was seen in the US in March 1895, running at the Lyceum Theatre on Broadway for 40 performances. It was revived on Broadway at the Comedy Theatre in 1918 with a cast including Norman Trevor and Beatrice Beckley as the Chilterns, Julian L'Estrange as Lord Goring and Constance Collier as Mrs Cheveley. The next (and at 2021 the most recent) Broadway presentation was Peter Hall's production, seen at the Ethel Barrymore Theatre in 1996–97, featuring its original West End lead players, except for the Lady Chiltern, now played by Penny Downie.

An Ideal Husband was produced in Australia in April 1895 by the Brough-Boucicault company; they gave the play its New Zealand premiere later in the same year. The Irish premiere was in Dublin in 1896, given (with no mention of the author's name) by a touring company managed by Hawtrey, at the Gaiety Theatre. The cast included Alma Stanley as Mrs Cheveley and Cosmo Stuart, promoted from his small role in the London production, as Lord Goring.

A French translation was given in Geneva in 1944. The first performance in France recorded by Les Archives du spectacle was in 1955; the site records seven French productions between then and 2016.

=== Settings ===
Rex Whistler designs for the 1943–44 London revival:

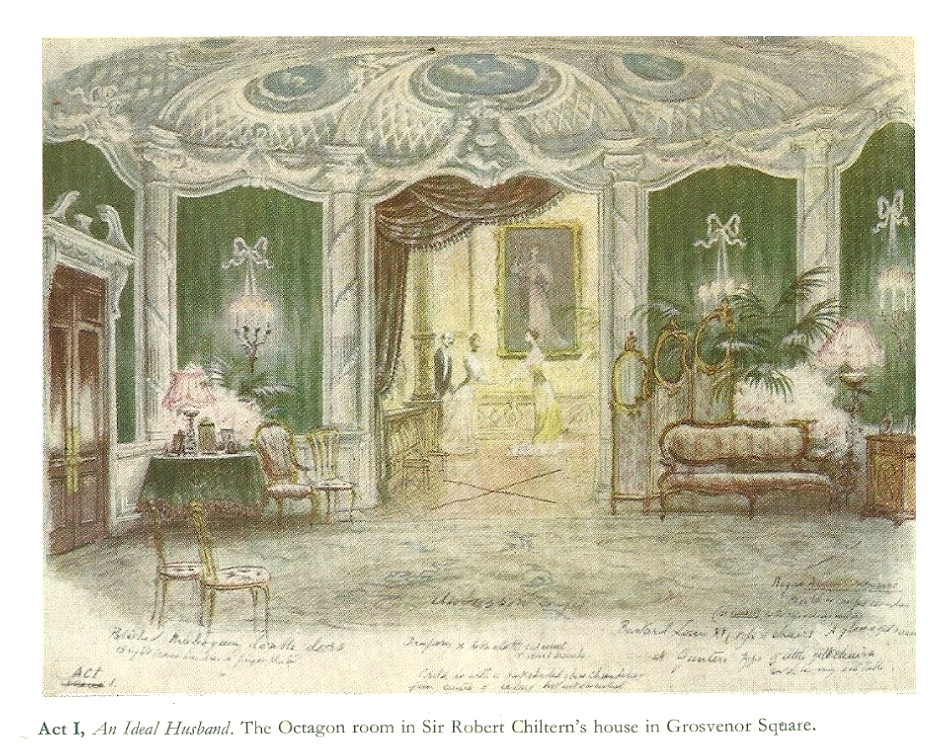
Act I

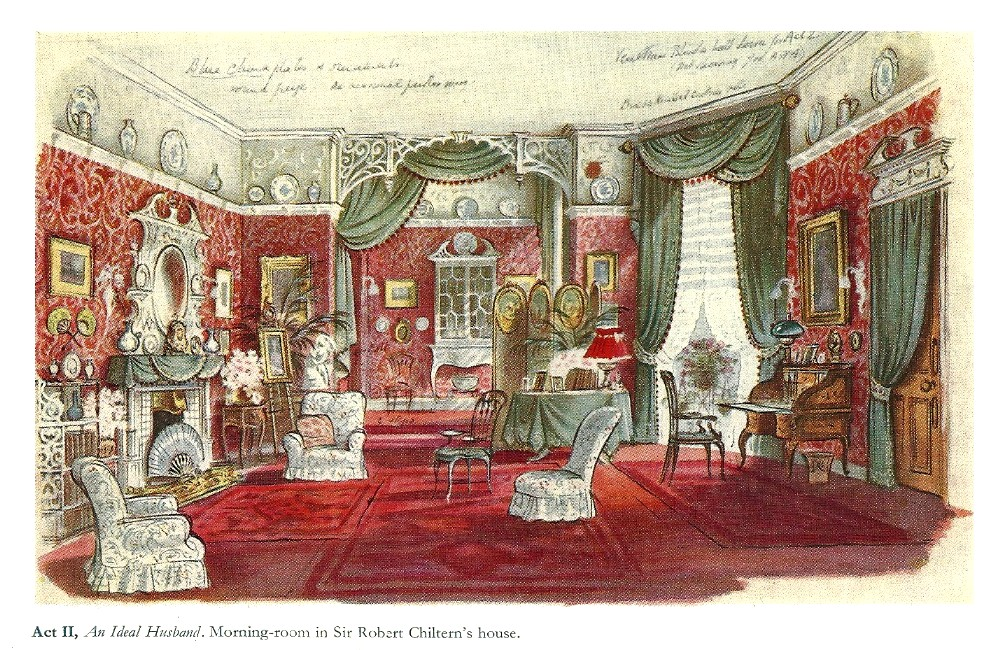
Acts II and IV

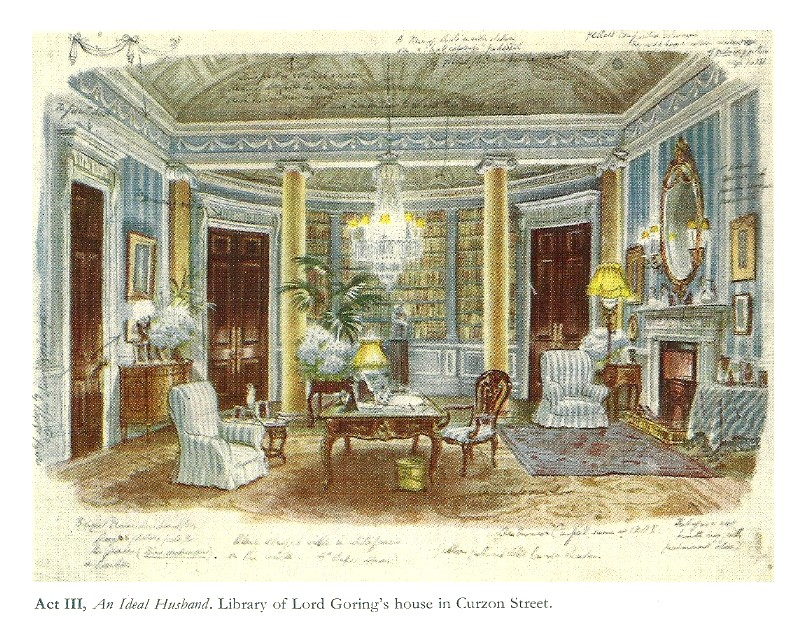
Act III

=== Commemoration ===
To mark the centenary of the first production, Sir John Gielgud unveiled a plaque at the Haymarket Theatre in January 1995, in the presence of, among many others, Wilde's grandson Merlin Holland and the Marquess of Queensberry.

== Adaptations ==
=== Films ===
There have been at least six adaptations of the play for the cinema:

- in 1935, a German film directed by Herbert Selpin and starring Brigitte Helm and Sybille Schmitz;
- in 1947, a British film produced by London Films and starring Paulette Goddard, Michael Wilding and Diana Wynyard;
- in 1947, an Argentine film directed by Luis Bayón Herrera and starring Santiago Gómez Cou and Alicia Barrié
- in 1980, a Soviet version starring Lyudmila Gurchenko and Yury Yakovlev;
- in 1999, a British film starring Julianne Moore, Minnie Driver, Jeremy Northam, Cate Blanchett and Rupert Everett;
- in 2000, a British film starring James Wilby and Sadie Frost.

=== Radio and television ===
The BBC has broadcast seven radio adaptations since its first, in 1926: a 1932 version starring Leslie Perrins and Kyrle Bellew; a radio version of the 1943 Westminster Theatre production; a Bristol Old Vic version in 1947 featuring William Devlin, Elizabeth Sellars, Catherine Lacey and Robert Eddison; a 1950 production with Griffith Jones, Fay Compton and Isabel Jeans; a 1954 version produced by Val Gielgud; a 1959 adaptation starring Tony Britton and Faith Brook; a 1970 version with Noel Johnson, Ronald Lewis, Jane Wenham and Rosemary Martin; and a 2007 adaption with Alex Jennings, Emma Fielding, Janet McTeer and Jasper Britton.

BBC television adaptations were broadcast in 1958 (with Ronald Leigh-Hunt, Sarah Lawson, Faith Brook and Tony Britton) and 1969 (with Keith Michell, Dinah Sheridan, Margaret Leighton and Jeremy Brett).

A television version (Ein Idealer Gatte) in German was broadcast in June 1958 by Nord und Westdeutscher Rundfunkverband (NWRV) with Marius Goring as Lord Goring and Albert Lieven as Sir Robert Chiltern.

== Notes, references and sources ==
=== Sources ===
- Beckson, Karl (2003). Oscar Wilde: The Critical Heritage. London: Routledge. ISBN 978-1-13-472286-0.
- Jackson, Russell (1993). "Introduction". An Ideal Husband. London: A & C Black. ISBN 978-0-71-363789-2.
- Parker, John, ed. (1922). Who's Who in the Theatre (4th ed.). London: Sir Isaac Pitman and Sons. OCLC 473894893.
- Raby, Peter (1997). "Wilde's Comedies of Society". In Raby, Peter (ed.). The Cambridge Companion to Oscar Wilde. London: Cambridge University Press. ISBN 978-0-52-147987-5.
- Wearing, J. P. (1976). The London Stage, 1890–1899: A Calendar of Plays and Players. Metuchen, New Jersey: Scarecrow Press. ISBN 978-0-81-080910-9 – via Internet Archive.
- Wilde, Oscar (1899). An Ideal Husband. London: L. Smithers. OCLC 1046540480.
- Wilde, Oscar (1966). Plays. London: Penguin. OCLC 16004478.
