= Mrs. Bernard Beere =

English actress (1851–1915)

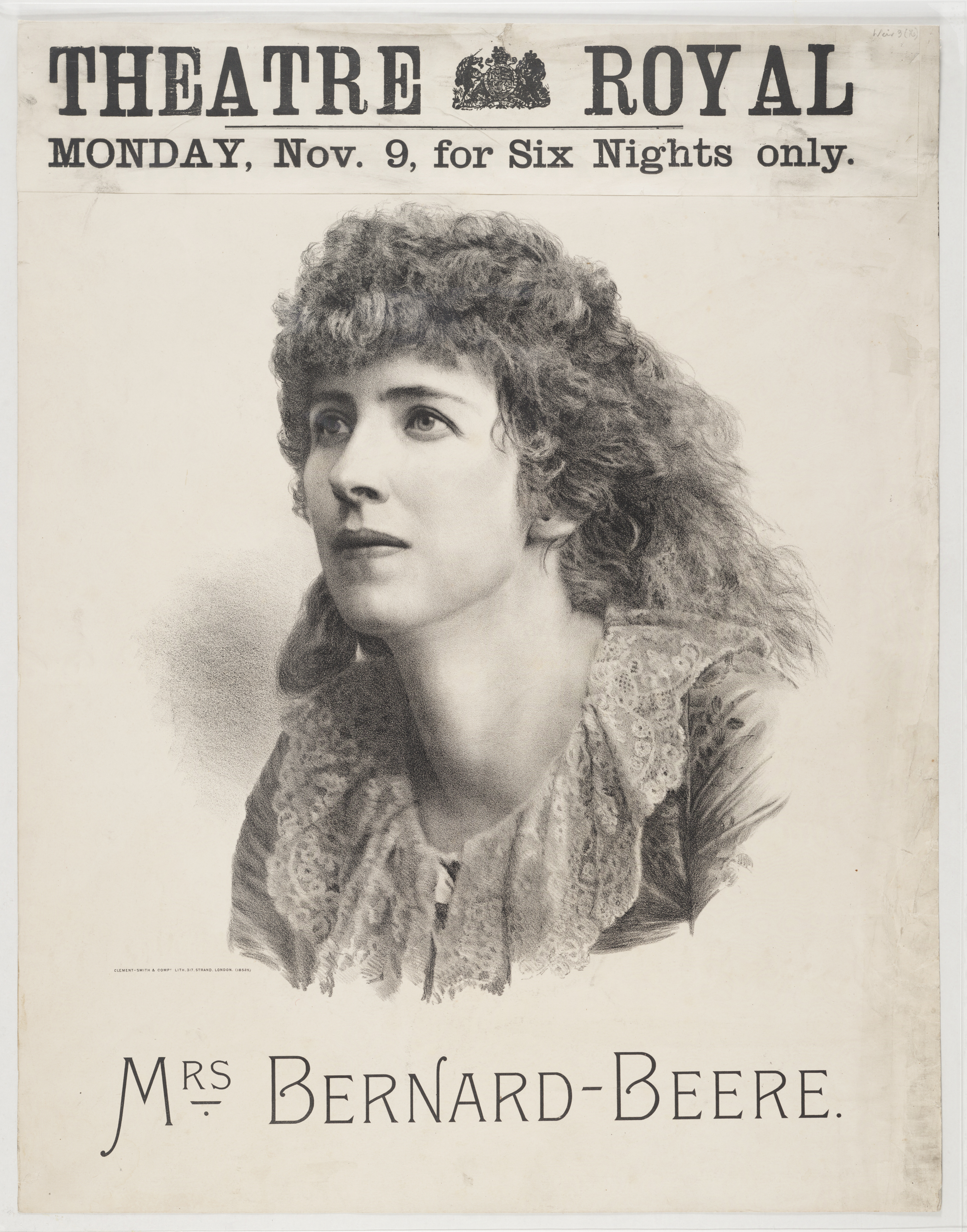
- Lithograph of Mrs Bernard-Beere in 1885
- Born: Fanny Mary Whitehead; 5 October 1851; King's Lynn, Norfolk, England
- Died: 25 March 1915 (aged 63)
- Other names: Fanny Bernard-Beere
- Occupation: Actress
- Spouse: Edward Cholmeley Dering (m. 1874; died 1874) Edward Beer (m. 1876, divorced) Alfred Charles Seymour Olivier (m. 1900)
- Children: 1

Fanny Mary Whitehead (5 October 1851 – 25 March 1915) was an English actress in the mid-19th century. She was also known, after her marriage as Fanny Bernard-Beere, billed as Mrs. Bernard Beere.

== Early life ==
She was born in 1851 in King's Lynn in Norfolk, England, the daughter of Francis Wilby Whitehead, who was listed on the 1861 England census as an "Artist and Picture Dealer". Her birth was the result of an affair - it is family lore that her mother was a housekeeper who died shortly after her birth, but it is unknown who this woman could be, since Francis Wilby didn't seem to have any servants. Francis Wilby Whitehead's wife, Elizabeth Jane Jarrold, left him in 1855 because of "his drunkenness and other causes" (adultery) and took her children, except for their son, Francis Wilby, Jr., and emigrated to America. In the 1861 England Census Francis Whitehead is shown as living with his common law wife, Mary Elizabeth Linford, her son James, Francis Wilby, Jr., and Fanny Mary. Her father Francis Wilby Whitehead died in 1862, when Fanny was just 11 years old.

== Theatrical career ==
Beere was trained for the stage by Hermann Vezin, appearing first in London at the Opera Comique in 1877. Later she played Emilia in Othello and various English comedy roles at the St. James's Theatre. She appeared in W. S. Gilbert's play Gretchen in 1879. In 1883 she was engaged by the Bancrofts to play leading parts in Fédora and other dramas at the Haymarket Theatre. In 1891 she played Lady Teazle in Charles Wyndham's production of School for Scandal, and two years later played Mrs. Arbuthnot with Herbert Beerbohm Tree in Oscar Wilde's A Woman of No Importance.

Beere married three times; firstly in 1874 to Edward Cholmeley Dering (1833–1874), with whom she had a daughter, Janet Elizabeth Adela Dering (1874–1875). In 1876 as a young widow she married merchant Edward Beer (1850–1915) at St. George's church in Bloomsbury in London. After her second marriage she retired a short time from the stage, presently returning to it as Mrs. Bernard Beere. They presumably divorced before in 1900 as a 'widow' she married wine merchant Alfred Charles Seymour Olivier (1867–1922) in St. Mary's church in Kilburn. In 1892 she toured Australia with Otho Stuart as her leading man and in the same year visited the United States professionally.

She is mentioned in Women of History where she is referred to as an operatic soprano.
