= Drawing room play =

Type of literary work

A drawing room play is a type of play, developed during the Victorian period in the United Kingdom of Great Britain and Ireland. They set upper and middle-class characters confronting a social problem of the time with a comedic twist. The play is formed from a blend of three parts: part well-made play, part society drama, part comedy of manners. Exponents of this style include Henrik Ibsen, Arthur Wing Pinero, George Bernard Shaw, Oscar Wilde, Edward Martyn and George Moore.

The name drawing room play has its origins in the upper and middle classes of Victorian society, who with time on their hands, enacted amateur plays for the pleasure of their families in the drawing room.

The style was later revisited by playwrights such as Noël Coward and J. B. Priestley; with in turn John Osborne and the Angry young men, in reaction to the revival, creating kitchen sink dramas.

== Examples ==
- Dying for Love by John Maddison Morton
- Orange Blossoms by J. P. Wooler
- Romantic Attachment by Arthur Wood
- Match Making by John Poole
- The Gay Lord Quex by Arthur Wing Pinero
- Lady Frederick by W. Somerset Maugham
- Oscar Wilde's The Importance of Being Earnest is one of the most widely known examples of the drawing room play. His other plays in this style are Lady Windermere's Fan, A Woman of No Importance and An Ideal Husband.
- Aren't We All? by Frederick Lonsdale
- Relative Values by Noël Coward
- An Inspector Calls by J. B. Priestley
- Who's Afraid of Virginia Woolf? by Edward Albee.

== See also ==
- Chamber play
- Comedy of manners
- Silver fork literature
