= Diplomacy (play) =

Play by B. C. Stephenson and Clement Scott

Diplomacy is an 1878 English play which is a translation and adaptation by B. C. Stephenson and Clement Scott of the 1877 French play Dora by Victorien Sardou. It saw frequent revivals and was a popular play for over fifty years.

== History ==
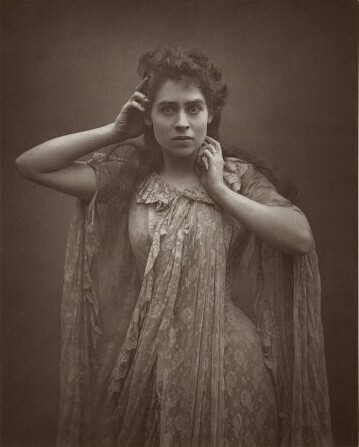
Eleanor Calhoun as Dora in Diplomacy, 1885

Sardou's original play debuted in Paris in January 1877, and was a success, making it ripe for "adaptation" into English. B. C. Stephenson and Clement Scott had previously adapted the Sardou play Nos Intimes for the Bancrofts, under the name Peril to great success, and thus they were engaged to adapt Dora as well (with contributions by the Bancrofts) for use at the Princes of Wales Theatre. Diplomacy was described by the English theatrical paper The Era as "the great dramatic hit of the season". From 12 January 1878 to 10 January 1879 it ran on a single bill and long held a record as the only English theatre production to stay unchanged for a year. A revival opening on 8 November 1884 by the Bancrofts at The Haymarket ran for another 117 performances. Later English revivals occurred in 1893 at the Garrick, in 1913 (featuring Owen Nares and Gladys Cooper) at Wyndham's, in 1924 at the Adelphi, and at Prince's in 1933.

Diplomacy had its Broadway debut at Wallack's Theatre on 1 April 1878 and played until 15 June, the end of the season. It remained a favorite play whenever revived by the Wallack company. It saw Broadway revivals in 1892 at the Star Theatre, in 1901 at the Empire (produced by Charles Frohman, 56 perf.), a 1910 revival at Maxine Elliott's Theatre (33 perf.), another Frohman revival at the Empire in 1914 (63 perf.), and a 1928 revival at Erlanger's Theatre (40 perf.).

The Jitney Players touring company performed an updated version of the play by Ethel Barrymore in 1938.

== Original London cast (1878) ==
- John Clayton as Henry Beauclerc
- William Hunter Kendal as Julian Beauclerc
- Arthur Cecil as Baron Stein
- Squire Bancroft as Count Orloff
- Mr. Dean as Antoine
- Madge Kendal as Dora
- Effie Bancroft as Countess Zika
- Roma Le Thiere as Marquise

== Original Broadway cast (1878) ==
- Lester Wallack as Henry Beauclerc
- Henry James Montague as Captain Julian Beauclerc
- Frederic Robinson at Count Orloff
- W.R. Floyd as Algie Fairfax
- J.W. Shannon as Baron Stein
- W.J. Leonard as Markham
- W.A. Eytange as Charven
- C.E. Edwin as Sheppard
- Herbert Ayling as Antoine
- J. Peck as Francois
- Rose Coghlan as Countess Zicka
- Maude Granger as Dora
- Madame Ponisi as Marquise de rio Zares
- Pearl Eytinge as Mion

== Adaptations ==
F.C. Burnand wrote an 1878 burlesque of the play called Dora and Diplunacy.

It was adapted to silent films in 1916 and 1926. A BBC radio version aired in June 1938.
