= Jitney Players =

Traveling American acting company formed in 1923

Jitney Players was the name of a traveling American acting company that was formed in 1923.

== Origin ==
The Jitney Players were begun by Horace B. Cheney Jr., He and his wife, Alice, "planned the formation of a troupe of strolling players", and he developed plans for traveling via automobiles. The idea grew out of his wife's theatrical experience before they married. Alice B. Keating (her maiden name) and Constance Wilcox put on plays during summers in Wilcox's yard in Madison, Connecticut, first using the name Woodland Garden Plays and later The Playbarn. The newlywed Cheneys helped Wilcox put on one-act plays in her backyard barn, and in the summer of 1923 someone requested that the group perform in another town. Wilcox chose not to go, but the Cheneys accepted, and the Jitney Players were born. The travels did not stop with that other town but "proceeded from village to village". The newly formed company used the Talcott Bradley House in Madison as headquarters.

== Bankruptcy ==
The Players filed a petition in bankruptcy court in Madison, Connecticut, on September 1, 1934. Alice Keating Cheney, president of the group, signed the petition, which listed $142 in assets and $48,016 in liabilities, including wages due to actors.

== Logistics ==
During the Players' first 11 years, the troupe traveled as far north as Canada and as far south as Mexico. Each summer one or more vehicles left Madison carrying a stage, performers, stagehands, costumes, lights, props and scenery. Ahead lay "a summer-long tour of one-night stands". By 1929, the transportation had grown from a single truck to three trucks "with six or seven automobiles stringing along behind". The equipment was set up on whatever space was available, including tennis courts and athletic fields.

The first tour, in New England in 1923, included students from Yale and Harvard, "erecting the stage, setting the scenes and sleeping in tents."

Initially the Players traveled through Connecticut, Massachusetts, New Hampshire, and Rhode Island, often performing in "many spots that perchance never otherwise see a local dramatic presentation of any sort". Summer productions were performed using scenery custom-built for the company's truck. In winter weather plays were staged in heated halls of schools and colleges. The troupe's first venture into New York City was in 1928, at the Cherry Lane Theatre.

An item in The Emerson Quarterly in 1928 described the Players' truck-mounted stage:

It is difficult to believe that [the set] is mounted entirely on a stage the main portion of which is a Ford truck. . . . Heavy drapes or hangings form a considerable part. When period furniture is needed, cardboard cut-outs are used to fit around the chairs, tables, and so on. It is, of course, impractical to carry around a variety of heavy furniture. The Jitney Players carry a portable lighting system. Side flaps afford dressing rooms at the right and left of the stage. The players live in tents, and living quarters and theater can be set up or struck in very short order.

By 1929 transported equipment included 300 folding chairs, which often were too few for the audience.

Members of the troupe sometimes stayed with citizens where they were performing. Ethel Barrymore Colt said in 1938, "We get the newly married daughter's bed, or the son's bed while he's in Europe, and then a good cup of coffee from a kind mother".

While traveling, the actors doubled as stagehands, doing work such as setting up scenery and lights. Actresses handled wardrobe-mistress-type duties, such as pressing clothes and sewing as needed.

The company's first winter tour was in 1928–29. By 1939, the tour had grown to a total of 8,000 miles with the group performing in 20 states.

Horace Cheney was the group's initial manager. His son, Bushnell Cheney, succeeded him as manager.

Notable actors who performed with the group included:King Donovan and Anne Seymour.

== Selected productions ==
- Ah, Wilderness!
- Both Your Houses
- Creatures of Impulse
- Diplomacy
- The Duenna
- Private Lives
- Seven Keys to Baldpate
- Smilin' Through
- The Sorcerer
- Tonight at 8:30
- A Trip to Scarborough

== Papers ==
The New York Public Library houses records of the Jitney Players in its Billy Rose Theatre Division. Papers in the collection "mostly document the Jitney Players' theatrical performances through photographs, scrapbooks, clippings, correspondence and playbills".
