= Roma Guillon Le Thière =

Italian actress

Roma Guillon Le Thière (c. 1837–1903) was an Italian actress whose career was on the London stage. She appeared in the original productions of Diplomacy and of Oscar Wilde's play A Woman of No Importance.

== Life ==
Le Thière's London debut was in 1865 at the New Royalty Theatre, as Emilia in Shakespeare's Othello. During the following years she appeared in Hunted Down at St James's Theatre; Life for Life by John Westland Marston at the Lyceum Theatre; revivals of T. W. Robertson's plays Ours and Caste at the Prince of Wales's Theatre; and Rob Roy at the Drury Lane Theatre, as Helen Macgregor.

In January 1878 she created the part of the Marquise de Rio Zares in Diplomacy, an adaptation of Dora by the French dramatist Victorien Sardou, at the Prince of Wales's Theatre. A reviewer in The Daily Telegraph (8 February 1878) wrote: "Especial attention may be invited to the scene between mother and daughter in the first act, so excellently sustained by Miss Le Thiere as the Marquise de Rio Zares, and Mrs. Kendal as Dora. We have here a picture of pure and tender affection approached in an earnest spirit and touched by both ladies with graceful skill, a scene instinct with variety, charm, and truth. ...."

In July 1869 at the Haymarket Theatre she produced her own play All for Money, a comedy in which Amy Sedgwick, Jane Stephens and Henry Irving appeared; the play was unsuccessful.

Le Thière in the cast of the original production of A Woman of No Importance

Later appearances were in Partners by Robert Buchanan and The Pompadour by Sydney Grundy, both at the Haymarket Theatre in the 1887–1888 season; Ravenswood by Herman Merivale at the Lyceum Theatre in the 1890–1891 season; and John A Dreams by C. Haddon Chambers at the Haymarket Theatre in the 1894–1895 season.

In April 1893 at the Haymarket Theatre Le Thière created the role of Lady Caroline Pontefract in A Woman of No Importance by Oscar Wilde, directed by Herbert Beerbohm Tree.
