= Bernard Capes =

English author

- Capes in c1916
- Born: Bernard Edward Joseph Capes; August 30, 1854; London, England
- Died: November 2, 1918 (aged 64); Winchester, England
- Education: Beaumont College
- Occupations: Novelist, short story writer, journalist
- Relatives: Harriet Capes (sister); John Moore Capes (uncle); Renalt Capes (son)
- Writing career
- Period: Victorian era
- Genres: Fiction, supernatural fiction, historical fiction, poetry
- Notable works: The Mill of Silence (1897), The Lake of Wine (1898), At a Winter’s Fire (1899), The Skeleton Key (1919)

Bernard Edward Joseph Capes (30 August 1854 – 2 November 1918) was an English author.

== Biography ==
Capes was born in London, one of eleven children: his elder sister, Harriet Capes, was a noted translator and author of more than a dozen children's books. His uncle, John Moore Capes, was President of the Oxford Union while attending Balliol College, Oxford and published a semi-autobiographical novel. His grandfather, John Capes, had converted to Roman Catholicism, so Capes was brought up a Catholic, and educated at the Catholic college Beaumont College. However, he rapidly 'gave this up'.

Capes was a prolific Victorian author, publishing more than forty volumes – romances, mysteries, poetry, history – together with many articles for the magazines of the day. His early writing career was as a journalist, later becoming editor of the monthly magazine The Theatre, the most highly regarded British dramatic periodical of its time. Other magazines for which Capes wrote included Blackwood's, Butterfly, Cassell's, Cornhill Magazine, Hutton's Magazine, Illustrated London News, Lippincott's, Macmillan's Magazine, Literature, New Witness, Pall Mall Magazine, Pearson's Magazine, The Idler, The New Weekly, and The Queen.

Capes wrote numerous ghost stories, which were later rediscovered by anthologist Hugh Lamb in the 1970s. His 1899 story "The Black Reaper" features a supernatural personification of Death. Capes also wrote historical novels. Love Like A Gipsy (1901) is set during the American Revolution. Capes' Bembo: A Tale of Italy is a novel which takes place during the reign of Galeazzo Sforza, the fifteenth-century Duke of Milan.

He finally committed to writing novels full-time, taking around four months for each novel. On several occasions he had two or three novels published in the same year – and even four in 1910. His first success came in 1897, when he entered a $30,000 competition for new authors sponsored by the Chicago Record. He was awarded second prize for The Mill of Silence, published by Rand, McNally that year. The following year the Chicago Record ran the competition again, and this time Capes won it with The Lake of Wine, published by Heinemann.

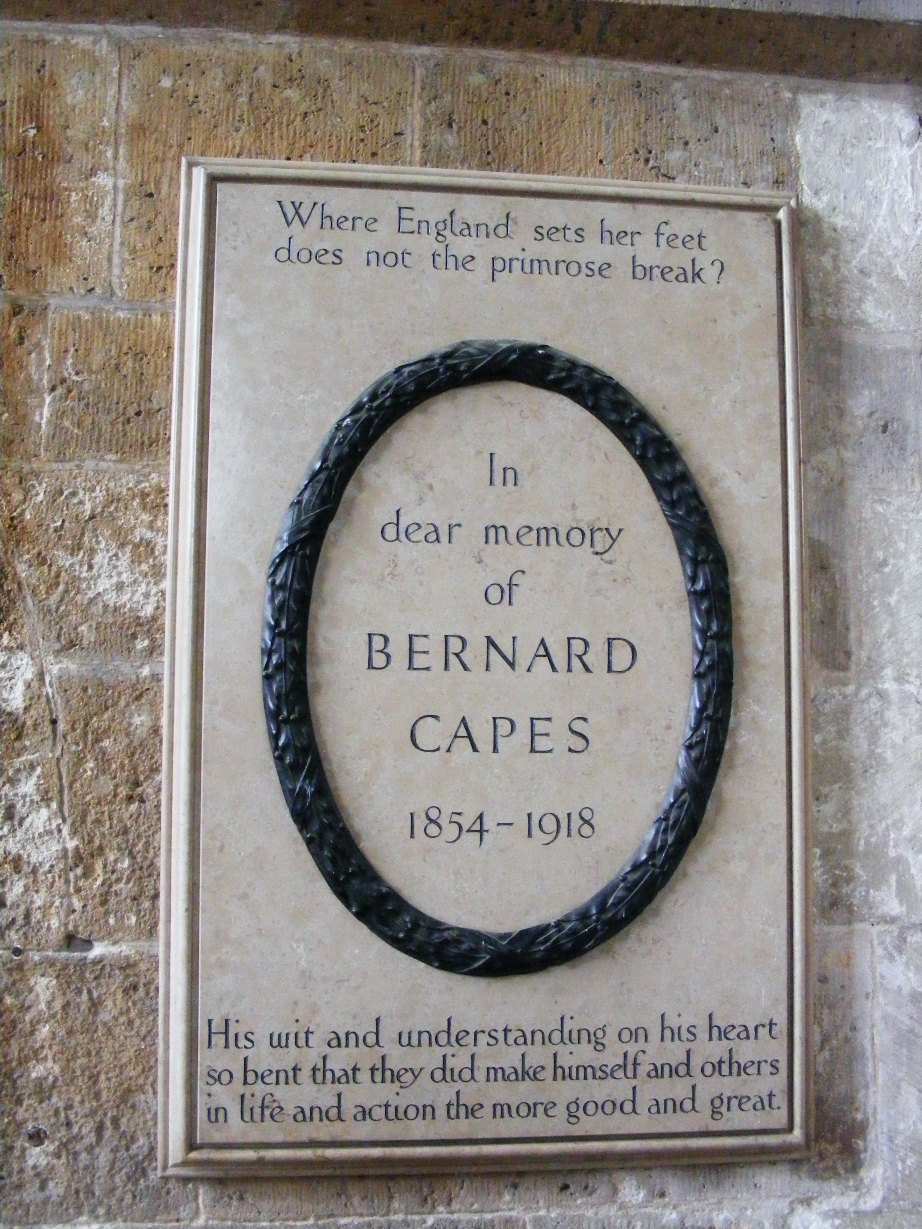
Bernard Capes Memorial Plaque in Winchester Cathedral

He died in the 1918 'flu epidemic. A memorial plaque commemorating his life is in Winchester Cathedral (where he worked in the years leading up to his death), affixed to the wall by the door which leads to the crypt.

Capes' son Renalt Capes (1905-1983), and grandsons, also (Dr) Renalt Capes (1956-), Ian Bernard and Graham Burns, are also published authors.

== Works ==
(Information supplied by Capes's grandson Ian Bernard Graham Burns)

- The Haunted Tower (as 'Bevis Cane'), Spencer Blackett, London, 1888
- The Missing Man (as 'Bevis Cane'), Eglington & Co, 1889
- The Mill of Silence, Rand, McNally & Company, Chicago, 1897
- The Lake of Wine, Heinemann, 1897, 8 editions published between 1898 and 1931 and held by 23 libraries worldwide
- Adventures of the Comte de Muette, William Blackwood and Sons, Edinburgh, 1898, 9 editions published in 1898 and held by 35 libraries worldwide
- The Mysterious Singer, J.W. Arrowsmith,
- Our Lady of Darkness, Wm Blackwood, 1898
- At a Winter's Fire, Arthur Pearson, 1899, Short Stories, 13 editions published between 1899 and 2006 and held by 173 libraries worldwide, (e-issued, 1978, by Ayer Co Publishing (USA)
- From Door to Door, Wm Blackwood, 1900, Short Stories
- Joan Brotherhood, C. A. Pearson, London, 1900
- Love Like a Gypsy, Archibald Constable & Co, Westminster, 1901
- Plots, Methuen & Co, London, 1902, Short Stories
- A Castle in Spain, Smith, Elder & Co, London, 1903
- The Secret in the Hill, Smith, Elder & Co, London, 1903
- The Extraordinary Confessions of Diana Please, Methuen & Co, 1904
- A Jay of Italy, Methuen, 1905, 7 editions published between 1905 and 1995 and held by 22 libraries worldwide
- The Romance of Lohengrin, Dean and Son, 1906(?)
- Bembo: A Tale of Italy, Dutton & Co., NY, 1906, 2 editions published in 1906 and held by 33 libraries worldwide
- Loaves and Fishes (2nd edition 1906), 1906, Short Stories
- A Rogue's Tragedy, Methuen & Co, London 1906
- The Green Parrot, Smith, Elder & Co, 1908
- Amaranthus: A Book of Little Songs, T. Fisher Unwin, 1908
- The Love Story of St Bel, 1909
- The Great Skene Mystery, Methuen & Co, 1909
- Why Did He Do It?, 1910
- Historical Vignettes, 1st Series, T. Fisher Unwin, 1910, 13 editions published between 1904 and 1965 in English and Czech and held by 57 libraries worldwide
- Jemmy Abercraw, Methuen, 1910
- The Will and the Way, John Murray, London, 1910
- Gilead Balm, T. Fisher Unwin, 1911, 4 editions published in 1911 and held by 28 libraries worldwide
- The House of Many Voices, T. Fisher Unwin, London, 1911
- Jessie Bazley, Constable and Company, London, 1912
- Historical Vignettes, 2nd Series, Sidgwick & Jackson, 1912
- Bag and Baggage, Constable, 1912
- The Pot of Basil, Constable and Company, 1913
- The Story of Fifine, Constable, 1914 (re-issued 1919)
- The Fabulists, Mills & Boon, London, 1915, Short Stories
- Moll Davis, George Allen & Unwin, 1916
- If Age Could, Duckworth and Co, London, 1916
- Where England Sets Her Feet, 1918
- A Fool’s Passion and Other Poems
- The Skeleton Key, W. Collins Sons, London, 1919, 8 editions published between 1919 and 1929 in English and held by 30 libraries worldwide. Re-issued as The Mystery of the Skeleton Key, HarperCollins, London, September 2015
- The Black Reaper, ed Hugh Lamb, Equation, Wellingborough, 1989, held by 25 libraries worldwide
- The Black Reaper, ed Hugh Lamb, Ash-Tree Press, Ashcroft, British Columbia, 1998
- Dancing Shadows, Coachwhip Publications, Landisville, Pennsylvania, 2011
- Twists and Turns: Tales of Mystery, Adventure, Crime, and Humor, Coachwhip Publications, 2011

== Uncollected Stories ==
The following stories are not included in the six short story collections:-

- Wanted—A Bicycle. The Strand Magazine Vol. 17, June 1899
- Dunberry Bells. @ Papers Past New Zealand Newspapers, 26 July 1902
- As a Fly in Amber. The Illustrated London News, 9 December 1905. Also @ Papers Past
- The Diamond George. The Illustrated London News, 14–21 July 1906. Also @ Trove Australia Newspapers
- Love and the Belt. The London Magazine Vol.17, 1906. Also @ Trove
- The Vanishing Cheques. The London Magazine Vol.18, 1907. First published separately 1904 London: Daily Mail
- Norah's Secret. Cardiff Times, 15 February 1908. Also @ Trove
- Forfeits. @ Papers Past, 9 January 1909
- The Tell-Tale Hall-Mark. @ Trove, 21 December 1912
- St. Sigebert's Chimney. @ Trove, 6 September 1913
- A Popular Success. @ Trove, 12 March 1914
