= William Beatty-Kingston =

Beatty-Kingston

William Beatty-Kingston (1837 – 4 October 1900) was an English journalist, known both as a foreign correspondent and a music critic.

== Life and career ==
Beatty-Kingston was born in London in 1837. His father was a well-known scholar and archaeologist, for many years secretary of the English Historical Society. His mother was a composer, who published songs under the pseudonym "Marielle". Beatty-Kingston joined the staff of the Public Record Office, but found little scope for advancement there, and in 1856 he moved to work for the Austrian consular service in London. In 1860 he married a Parisienne, Cecile Antoinette Cadenne de Lannoy. They had a son and two daughters.

In 1866 Beatty-Kingston began working for The Daily Telegraph as its correspondent in Vienna, afterwards moving to Berlin, and then returning to London as the paper's foreign editor. His foreign assignments for the Telegraph included covering six conflicts: the Austro-Prussian War in 1866; the siege of Rome a year later; the Franco-Prussian War; the Herzegovina uprising in 1875–1877; the Serbian rebellion of 1876–1878; and the Russo-Turkish War of 1877–1878. As a correspondent with the Prussian forces in 1870–71 he got on well with Bismarck and was able to obtain the terms of the capitulation of Paris much earlier than his peers on other British papers or even the British government. A fluent linguist, Beatty-Kingston contributed not only to numerous British publications, including Macmillan's Magazine, The Fortnightly Review, The Graphic and The English Illustrated Magazine, but also continental papers such as Die Presse in Vienna and Perseveranze in Milan. He disliked gossip columns and refused to write for the society press.

In Austria and Germany, Beatty-Kingston developed a strong love of music. He was a contributor to magazines including The Theatre, for which he and his successor Herman Klein wrote the music column. In 1884 he wrote the English version of Millöcker's Der Bettelstudent for Carl Rosa, and later he was librettist of Herve's Frivoli at Drury Lane, the adapter for the English stage of Verdi's Falstaff and the writer of other librettos and books. His first book, A Journalist's Jottings (1880), was drawn from his reports as a foreign correspondent. He followed it with Monarchs I Have Met (1886). In 1887 he wrote two volumes on Music and Manners and Wanderer's Notes. He published in 1892 a 64-page booklet Intemperance: Its Causes and Its Remedies and in 1895 a 316-page book Men, Cities, and Events.

Beatty Kingston died suddenly at sea, aged 63, returning to England from France.

== Sources ==
- Wong, Helene Harlin (1955). The Late Victorian Theatre: as Reflected in 'The Theatre', 1878–1897 (Thesis). Louisiana State University. OCLC 10804838.

}
