= Eleanor Lazarovich-Hrebelianovich =

American actress

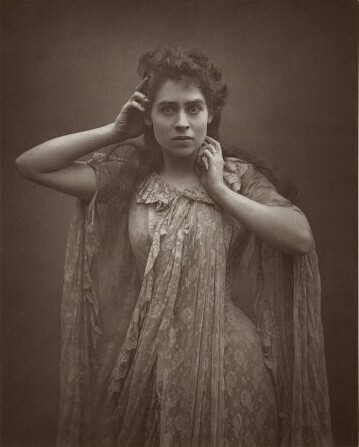
- Eleanor Calhoun as Dora in Diplomacy, 1885
- Born: 1862; Visalia
- Died: January 9, 1957; New York City

Princess Eleanor Lazarovich-Hrebelianovich (1862 – January 9, 1957) was an American actress who gained international fame under her maiden name Eleanor Calhoun and the wife of Prince Lazarovich-Hrebelianovich, a claimant to the throne of the Kingdom of Serbia.

Eleanor Hulda Calhoun was born in Visalia, California. Nicknamed "Nellie", she was the daughter of Judge E. E. Calhoun, a Tulare County, California pioneer and relative of John C. Calhoun, and Laura A. Davis Calhoun, a writer on biological and agricultural topics.

Her stage debut was as Juliet in Romeo and Juliet at the Grand Opera House in San Francisco in 1880. She became a protégé of Phoebe Hearst, but when Calhoun announced her engagement to Hearst's son William Randolph Hearst, she became enraged, labeling Calhoun a "Devil fish". Hearst informed Calhoun that her son would be disinherited if they married, and may have offered her a cash bribe. Calhoun moved to London.

Calhoun made her London debut in 1882 as Rosalind in As You Like It. In 1884, she and her friend Janey Sevilla Callander, Lady Campbell organized a lavish outdoor performance of As You Like It at the Campbell home of Coombe Hill Farm near Kingston upon Thames. Aside from Calhoun as Rosalind, the cast consisted of amateur actors. From 1883 to 1885 she appeared at the Haymarket Theatre, starring in roles such as Dora in Diplomacy and Lydia Languish in The Rivals. In 1888, she produced a stage adaptation of The Scarlet Letter at the Royalty Theatre, starring as Hester Prynne with Johnston Forbes-Robertson as Dimmesdale.

Calhoun moved to Paris to study and appear on stage with the famous French actor Benoît-Constant Coquelin. They starred in a French translation of The Taming of the Shrew at the Théâtre d'Orléans, with Calhoun playing Katherine. The height of her time in France was her role as Hermione in Andromache.

In 1903, she married Prince Stephan Lazarovich-Hrebelianovic. He was born Eugen Czernucki in Zagreb, but family tradition claimed descent from Lazar of Serbia and Vladislav Hercegović, and he reinvented himself as the fourteenth Duke of St. Sava and heir to the Serbian throne. The couple were prominent advocates for Serbia and co-wrote a book, The Servian people, their past glory and their destiny (1910). They divorced in 1926.

She largely retired from the stage after her marriage, but returned to star in several prominent performances. She returned to California in 1912 to appear as Doña Josefa de la Cortina de Argüello in the historical pageant The Mission Play. She ended her stage career performing Lady Macbeth in Stratford-on-Avon.

Eleanor Lazarovich-Hrebelianovich died on 9 January 1957 in New York City.

== Bibliography ==
- The Servian people, their past glory and their destiny (1910), with Prince Stephan Lazarovich-Hrebelianovic
- Pleasures and Palaces (1915)
- The Way: Christ and Evolution (1926)
