= Clement Scott =

English theatre critic and writer

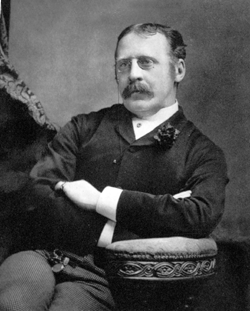
A Woodburytype portrait of Scott, from The Theatre, c. 1880

Clement William Scott (6 October 1841 – 25 June 1904) was an influential English theatre critic for The Daily Telegraph and other journals, and a playwright, lyricist, translator and travel writer, in the final decades of the 19th century. His style of criticism, acerbic, flowery and (perhaps most importantly) carried out on the first night of productions, set the standard for theatre reviewers through to today.

Scott accumulated enemies among theatre managers, actors and playwrights over the years, picking quarrels with William Archer, Ibsen, George Bernard Shaw and others. After he gave a particularly ill-considered 1898 interview, in which he attacked the morals of theatre people, especially actresses, he was forced to retire as a theatre critic, and his reputation and prospects suffered badly until, by the end of his life, he was impoverished.

== Life and career ==
Born the son of William Scott, the perpetual curate of Hoxton in Tower Division, Middlesex, Scott converted to Roman Catholicism before his 21st birthday. Educated at Marlborough College, he became a civil servant, working in the War Office beginning in 1860.

=== Early career ===
Encouraged to write by the humourist Tom Hood the younger, who also was a clerk in the War Office, Scott contributed to The Era, Weekly Dispatch, and to Hood's own paper, Fun, where Scott and W. S. Gilbert were colleagues. Scott's interest in writing and the theatre led him to brief dalliance with the failed Victoria Review.

He became the dramatic writer for The Sunday Times in 1863 but held the position for only two years because of the intemperance of his published opinions and his unpopular praise of the French theatre. In 1871, Scott began his nearly thirty years as a theatre critic with The Daily Telegraph. He also contributed regularly to The Theatre, a magazine that he edited from 1880 to 1889, and wrote sentimental poetry and song lyrics (including "Oh Promise Me"), which were often published in the magazine Punch by his friend, the editor, F. C. Burnand. Scott continued to work at the War Office until 1879, when he finally decided to earn his living entirely by writing.

As well as criticism, Scott wrote plays, including The Vicarage, The Cape Mail, Anne Mié, Odette, and The Great Divorce Case. He wrote several English adaptations of Victorien Sardou's plays, some of which were written in collaboration with B. C. Stephenson, such as Nos intimes (as Peril) and Dora (1878, as Diplomacy). The latter was described by the theatrical paper The Era as "the great dramatic hit of the season". It also played with success at Wallack's Theatre in New York. Scott and Stephenson also wrote an English version of Halévy and Meilhac's libretto for Lecocq's operetta Le Petit Duc (1878). Their adaptation so pleased the composer that he volunteered to write some new music for the English production. For all these, Scott adopted the pen name "Saville Rowe" (after Savile Row) to match Stephenson's pseudonym, "Bolton Rowe", another Mayfair street. The pieces with Stephenson were produced by the Bancrofts, the producers of T. W. Robertson's plays, which Scott admired. He also wrote accounts of holiday tours around the British Isles and abroad, becoming known for his florid style. Scott's travels also inspired his creative writing. Some sources say that after a tour of New Zealand, he wrote the tune to the "Swiss Cradle Song", later adapted as "Now Is the Hour" and as "Haere Ra", the Māori farewell song, which white New Zealanders "mistakenly thought [to be] an old Maori folksong". It is also used for the hymn "Search Me, O God", with lyrics by J. Edwin Orr. However, an Australian family has long claimed that the "Clement Scott" who wrote the tune is a pseudonym for a family member.

=== Poppyland and later years ===
In 1883, The Daily Telegraph printed an article which Scott had written about a visit to the north Norfolk coast. He became enamoured of the district and gave it the name Poppyland. His writing was responsible for members of the London theatre set visiting and investing in homes in the area. Ironically, he was unhappy at the result of his popularisation of this previously pristine area.

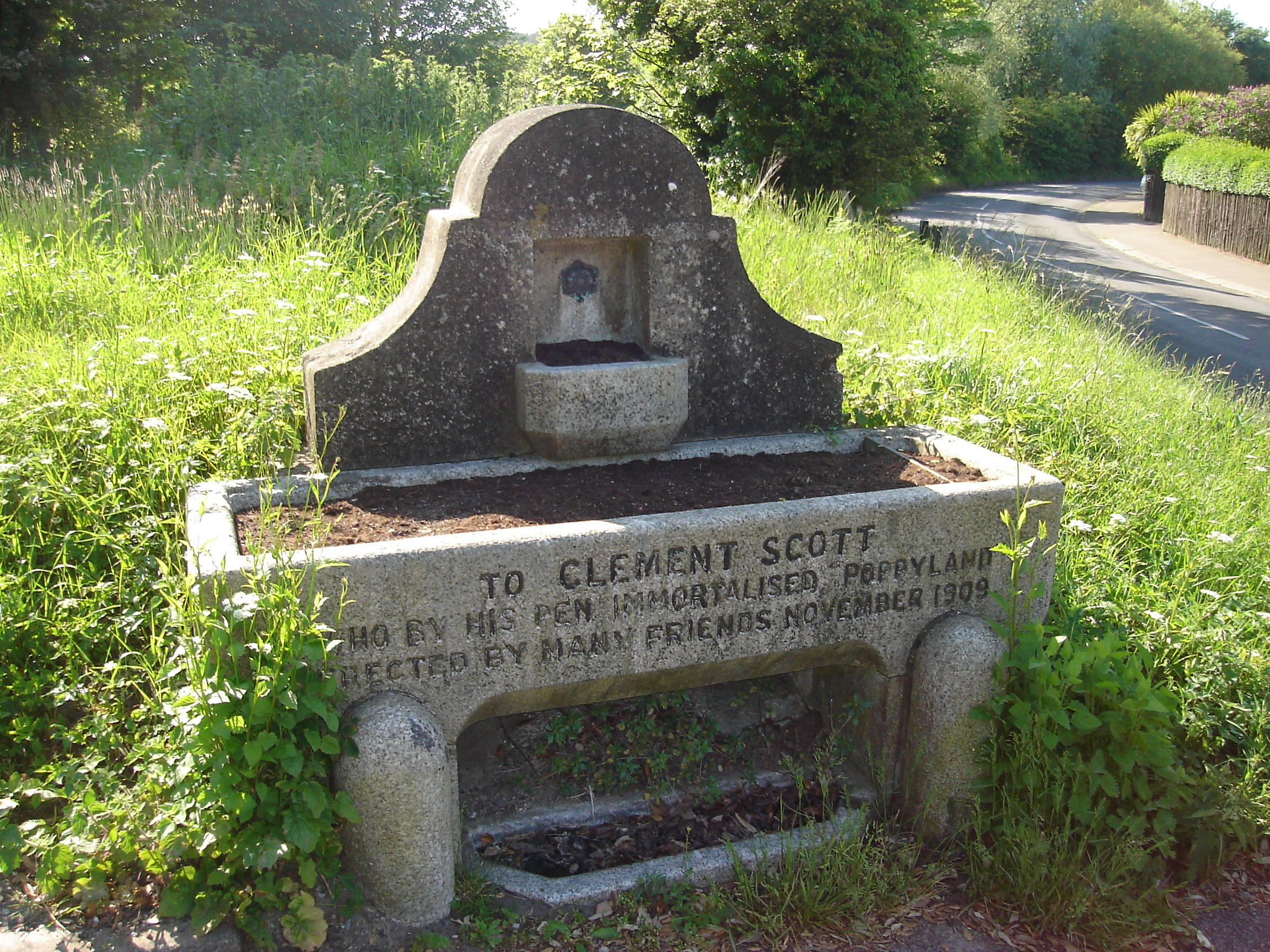
Clement Scott memorial at Cromer, Norfolk

Scott married Isabel Busson du Maurier, the sister of George du Maurier, and the couple had four children. She died in 1890, and he remarried Constance Margaret Brandon, an English journalist and actress, in San Francisco. Scott's long-time wish to be elected a member of the famous literary gentlemen's club, the Garrick Club (to which Henry Irving, Gilbert and Arthur Sullivan, among many other notable men belonged), was finally realised in 1892. After an ill-considered 1898 interview in Great Thoughts, Scott was forced to retire as a theatre critic and moved to Biarritz to write The Drama of Yesterday and Today. He then worked for a couple of years at the end of the century for the New York Herald, later returning to London. In 1900, he founded The Free Lance, a Popular Society and Critical Journal, for writers who worked by the job, which he edited.

Scott fell into illness and poverty in his last years and died at his residence in Woburn Square at the age of 62. Scott was buried in the crypt at the chapel attached to Nazareth House, Southend-on-Sea, a convent run by the Sisters of Nazareth.

== Style, controversies and influence ==
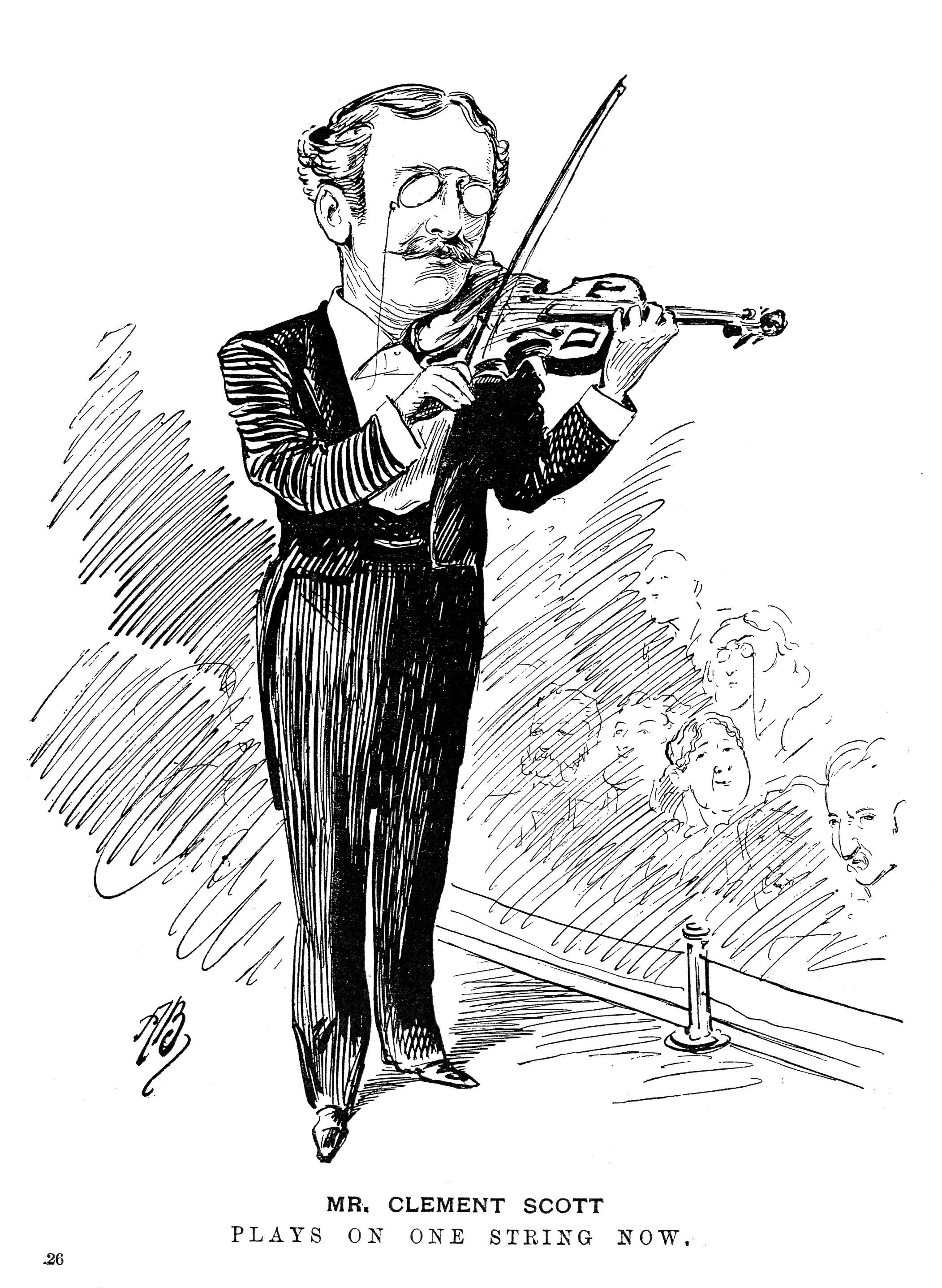
Scott playing The Daily Telegraph violin (1897)

Scott's position on The Daily Telegraph and the support of its proprietor, J. M. Levy, allowed him to pioneer the essay-style review of drama, which came to replace the earlier bare notices. His column of notes and reviews became very popular throughout Britain, and later his own magazine, The Theatre, achieved wide circulation. He wrote his theatre reviews immediately after he saw the opening night of a piece which, together with his short temper and his dislike of critic William Archer, the chief English supporter of Ibsen, tended to involve him often in controversies.

Scott played an important part in encouraging a more attentive attitude by theatre audiences. In his early days, it was not uncommon for audiences to be very boisterous and noisy, frequently booing and talking during productions, especially through the overture. He also insisted on first night reviews. It had been common for reviewers to wait a few days before writing about a production. Scott insisted that the paying audience on the first night should expect to see a fully fledged production, and not one where the leading characters did not know all their lines. Theatre managers disliked the opening night reviews when they felt that a new piece had not had time to settle down yet. On the other hand, Scott supported actor-managers of his time by providing them with translations of popular French plays and with his own plays.

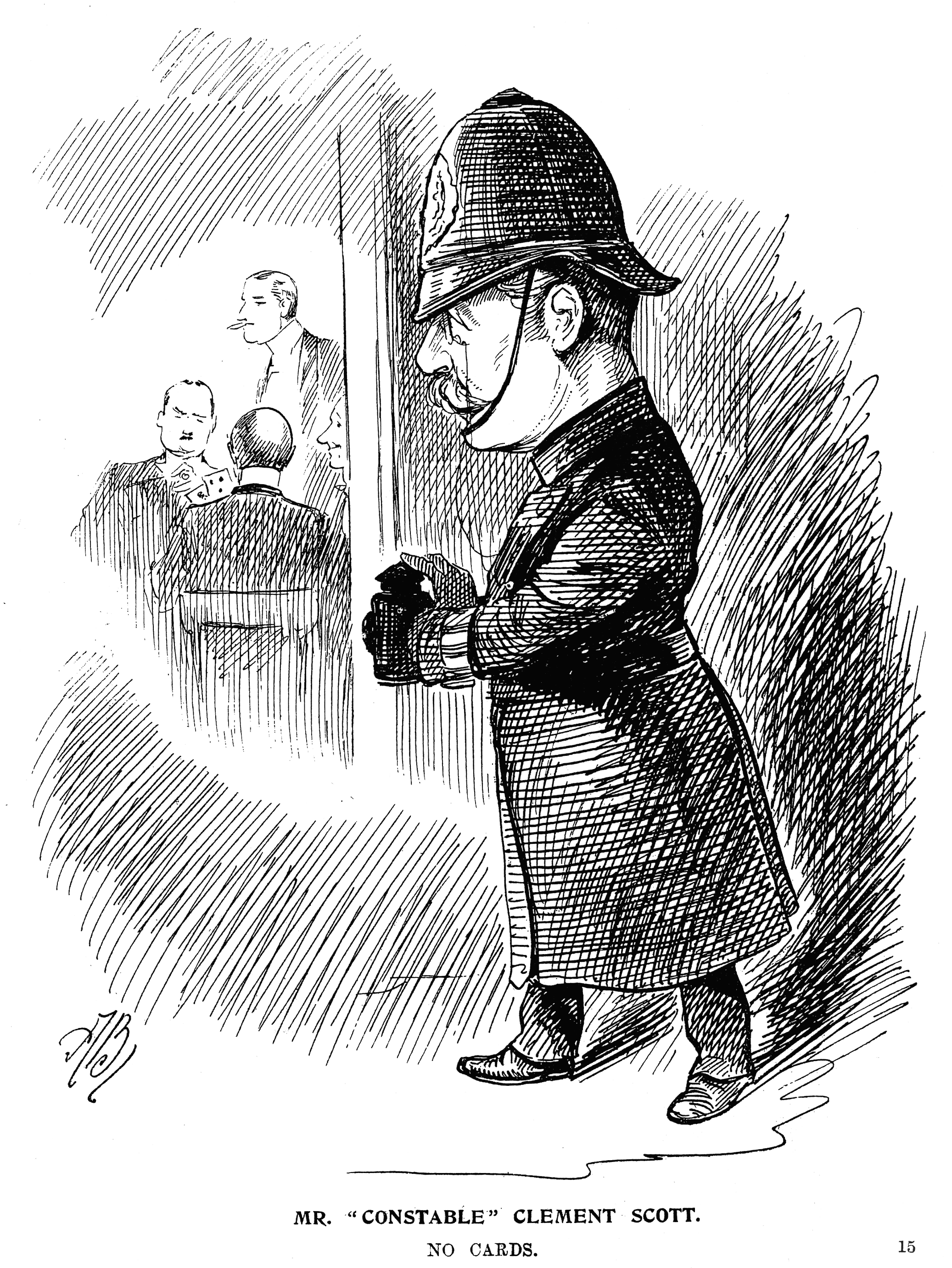
Scott in the Entr'acte in 1898, when he accused Ibsen and Shaw of being harmful to society

Early in his career, he wrote approvingly of the "cup and saucer" realism movement, led by T. W. Robertson, whose plays were notable for treating contemporary British subjects in realistic settings. Later, he favoured the grand and spectacular type of London theatrical production which had developed with new types of theatre building, electric lighting and technologies allowed more and more adventurous staging. As time went on, he became strongly conservative and opposed to the new drama of Ibsen and Shaw, arguing that domestic intrigue, sexual situations and wordy philosophising were inappropriate for an evening at the theatre, and even harmful to society, especially young women. Scott especially became embroiled in legal claims through his outspoken criticism of various actors and actresses. His scathing attacks on Ibsen and Shaw became evident in their lack of journalistic neutrality.

Scott outraged the theatre community with an extraordinary attack on the morals of theatre people in general, and especially of actresses, in an interview that was published in the evangelical weekly Great Thoughts in 1898. He said that the theatre warps people's character and that it was impossible for a pure woman to be successful in a stage career, and that all leading actresses were immoral and could have achieved their success only by virtue of the extent of their "compliance". Even before the publication, the transcript of the interview was released to the press, and Scott immediately received a firestorm of condemnation. Although he apologised and recanted his remarks, he was barred from theatres, and The Daily Telegraph was forced to dismiss him. He soon retired and found his reputation and prospects much diminished. By the end of his life, however, he received a measure of forgiveness, and shortly before his death the theatre community held a generous benefit for him.

His papers are located in the library of the University of Rochester. Filmmaker John Madden made his first film, for BBC Two television, Poppyland (1985), around the story of Scott's 1883 visit to Poppyland.
