= Karl Beckson =

American academic (1926–2008)

Karl Beckson

Karl E. Beckson (February 4, 1926 – April 29, 2008) was an American educator, scholar, and author of numerous articles and sixteen books on British literature, culture, and authors including Oscar Wilde, Arthur Symons, and Henry Harland. Of particular interest to him was the late 19th century Symbolist Movement and its influence on late 19th century and early 20th century authors including James Joyce, D. H. Lawrence, and Bernard Shaw. He co-authored, with Arthur Ganz, Literary Terms: A Dictionary, first published in 1960, and still available in its extensively revised 1990 third edition.

== Academic career ==
He earned a B.A., English, from University of Arizona in 1949, an M.A. from Columbia University in 1952, and a Ph.D. from Columbia University in 1959. At Columbia, he studied with Lionel Trilling, Mark Van Doren, and William York Tindall. The subject of his Ph.D. dissertation was the Rhymers' Club. He first taught at Columbia (1956–1959), then at Bronx Community College (1959–1960), and at Fairleigh-Dickinson University (1960–1961). He taught at Brooklyn College, City University of New York, from 1961 until his retirement in 2004 having held the title of professor since 1976. He led a seminar for psychiatry residents with Dr. Simon Grolnick at Cornell University Medical College (1981–1995) with the title of Lecturer of English in Psychiatry.

== Awards ==
City University of New York Summer Research Award, 1967. Research Foundation Award, 1972–1973. Andrew Mellon Fellowship, William Andrews Clark Memorial Library, 1978. National Endowment of the Arts Senior Fellow, 1989–90.

== Personal ==
Born Emmanuel Berkson to Lithuanian Jewish immigrants and raised in East Harlem and the Bronx, he obtained his first library card at the 96th Street branch of the New York Public Library. In 1943, at age 17, he volunteered for the United States Navy, serving to yeoman 2nd class aboard the destroyer USS Ross (DD-563), the only ship in U.S. naval history to survive two underwater mine explosions (Leyte Gulf, South Pacific). He was married since February 9, 1957 to Estelle Zimmerman, with whom he had two sons, Mace and Eric.

== Bibliography ==
- Literary Terms: A Dictionary; Farrar, Straus and Giroux, 1960.
- Great Theories in Literary Criticism; Farrar, Straus and Company, 1963.
- Oscar Wilde: The Critical Heritage; Routledge and Kegan Paul, 1970.
- Max and Will; Edited by Mary Lago and Karl Beckson; Harvard University Press, 1975.
- The Memoirs of Arthur Symons: Life and Art in the 1890s; The Pennsylvania State University Press, 1977.
- Henry Harland: His Life and Work; The Eighteen Nineties Society, 1978.
- Oscar Wilde: A Memoir by Theodore Wrattislaw; Foreword by Sir John Betjeman; Introduction and Notes by Karl Beckson; The Eighteen Nineties Society, 1979.
- Aesthetes and Decadents of the 1890s: An Anthology of British Poetry and Prose; Academy Chicago, 1981.
- Arthur Symons: A Life; Clarendon Press, 1987.
- Arthur Symons: Selected Letters 1880-1935; Edited by Karl Beckson and John M. Munro; The MacMillan Press, 1989.
- Arthur Symons: A Bibliography; Edited by Karl Beckson, Ian Fletcher, Lawrence W. Markert, John Stokes; ELT Press, 1990;
- London in the 1890s: A Cultural History; W.W. Norton, 1992.
- I Can Resist Everything Except Temptation and other Quotations from Oscar Wilde; Columbia University Press, 1996.
- The Oscar Wilde Encyclopedia; Foreword by Merlin Holland; AMS Press, 1998.
- The Complete Works of Oscar Wilde, Volume 1: Poems and Poems in Prose; Edited by Bobby Fong and Karl Beckson; Oxford University Press, 2000.
- The Religion of Art: A Modernist Theme in British Literature; AMS Press, 2006.
