= The Theatre (magazine) =

Defunct magazines published in the UK

Cover of June 1885 issue

The Theatre was a magazine published in London between 1877 and 1897.

It contained reviews of theatre productions around the world, theatrical news, short stories, verse and biographical sketches of important figures of the time, written by prominent critics, playwrights, managers and actors, and illustrated with Woodburytype photographs. Its longest-serving editor was Clement Scott, the most influential British drama critic of his time, and under his editorship The Theatre was regarded as the leading British theatre magazine.

== History ==
=== Early years ===
According to the Oxford Dictionary of National Biography (ODNB), The Theatre was founded by the actor-manager Henry Irving, initially as a vehicle for his self-promotion. Its first editor was Frederick William Hawkins, best known for his biography of Edmund Kean (1869).

The first issue came out in January 1877, and from then until August 1878 it was a weekly publication. After that The Theatre was published monthly. It provided topical articles, reviews of productions around the world, theatrical news, extracts from new novels and plays, and biographical sketches of theatrical celebrities of the time. From August 1878 sketches were illustrated with high quality Woodburytype photographs. The first in this "Portraits" series was Irving's leading lady, Ellen Terry, and Irving himself was featured in a similar article in the same issue.

Among those writing for the magazine during Hawkins's editorship were Irving, W. Davenport Adams, F. C. Burnand, H. J. Byron, W. S. Gilbert, George Grossmith, John Hollingshead and Tom Taylor.

=== Clement Scott, editor 1880 to 1889 ===
Clement Scott in 1885

In 1879 Irving sold The Theatre to the drama critic Clement Scott for £1,000, and from January 1880 to the end of 1889 Scott edited the magazine. He was widely seen as the most influential theatre critic of his time, and The Theatre enjoyed what one historian has called "dominating prestige and influence". In the words of the ODNB, Scott used his editorship "to consolidate his own position as London's principal leader of dramatic taste and opinion". Scott did not shy away from controversy, and in The Theatre he frequently provoked arguments, even feuds, with other writers. He also often published opinions disagreeing with his own. Despite its prestige The Theatre was not a highly profitable publication, and went through several financial crises under Scott and his successors before its closure at the end of 1897.

Under Scott the coverage of London theatre was expanded. Each issue would carry eight to ten reviews of new productions; West End premieres were reviewed in a section called "Our Play-Box". "Our Omnibus Box" contained a miscellany and editorial comment. Musical matters, including operas, concerts and publications, were covered in "Our Musical-Box", seen in some but not all issues. Contributors to The Theatre under Scott's editorship included Irving, Gilbert, William Archer, Lewis Carroll, J. T. Grein, Gilbert à Beckett, Arthur Wing Pinero, George R. Sims and Herbert Beerbohm Tree; those contributing to the music section included William Beatty-Kingston and Herman Klein. In addition to the reviews, articles ranged over diverse theatrical topics, from "The Immorality of French Comedy", to "The Old Globe Theatre", the reminiscences of E. A. Sothern, "French Translations of Hamlet", and W. S. Gilbert's autobiography.

=== 1889 to 1897 ===
Scott left in 1889, and for the remaining eight years of its existence The Theatre continued under Bernard Capes, Charles Eglington and Addison Bright. Under their editorships the content of the magazine remained broadly as it had been under Scott, with a few minor innovations, although Scott's combative style was abandoned. The title of "Our Play-Box" was changed to "Plays of the Month", and "Our Omnlbus-Box" became "Notes of the Month". From May 1893 the magazine carried a series of interviews with leading theatre personalities at home, which were the forerunners of many such interviews in 20th-century periodicals.

Contributors in the post-Scott era included Scott himself, Davenport Adams, Hollingshead, Beatty-Kingston, Joseph Bennett, William Henry Hudson, Jerome K. Jerome and William Poel. The final issue was published in December 1897.

== References and sources ==
=== Sources ===
- Graham, Walter (1980) [1930]. English Literary Periodicals. New York: Octagon Books. ISBN 978-0-374-93230-5.
- Wong, Helene Harlin (1955). The Late Victorian Theatre: as Reflected in 'The Theatre', 1878–1897 (Thesis). Louisiana State University. OCLC 10804838.
