= Les Archives du spectacle =

Les Archives du spectacle – The Performing Arts Archive – is an online French database covering live performance (theatre, dance, opera, puppetry, etc.). It was created in 2007.

== Goals ==
The site is designed to provide free information about plays, actors, actresses, directors, playwrights and other people and companies involved in the development of a show, a play, a musical or an opera in a French-speaking country (France, Switzerland, Belgium, Luxembourg, Canada). Details are given of major revivals as well as new works. Foreign shows performed in France are sometimes covered. The site offers no judgments on the quality of the shows it covers.

== Organization ==
The site is run from the city of Montpellier. It operates in co-operation with the French Performing Arts Archives and ARTCENA, a national centre created by the French Ministry of Culture to coordinate and increase digital resources on circus, street and theatre arts.

== History ==
The site's first prototype dates from December 2006, and the first version was launched in March 2007 by Jacques Brunerie, an engineer who graduated from the École nationale supérieure d'informatique et de mathématiques appliquées de Grenoble. The site is hosted by Infomaniak Network SA from Geneva.
