= The Colonel (play) =

Farce by F. C. Burnand

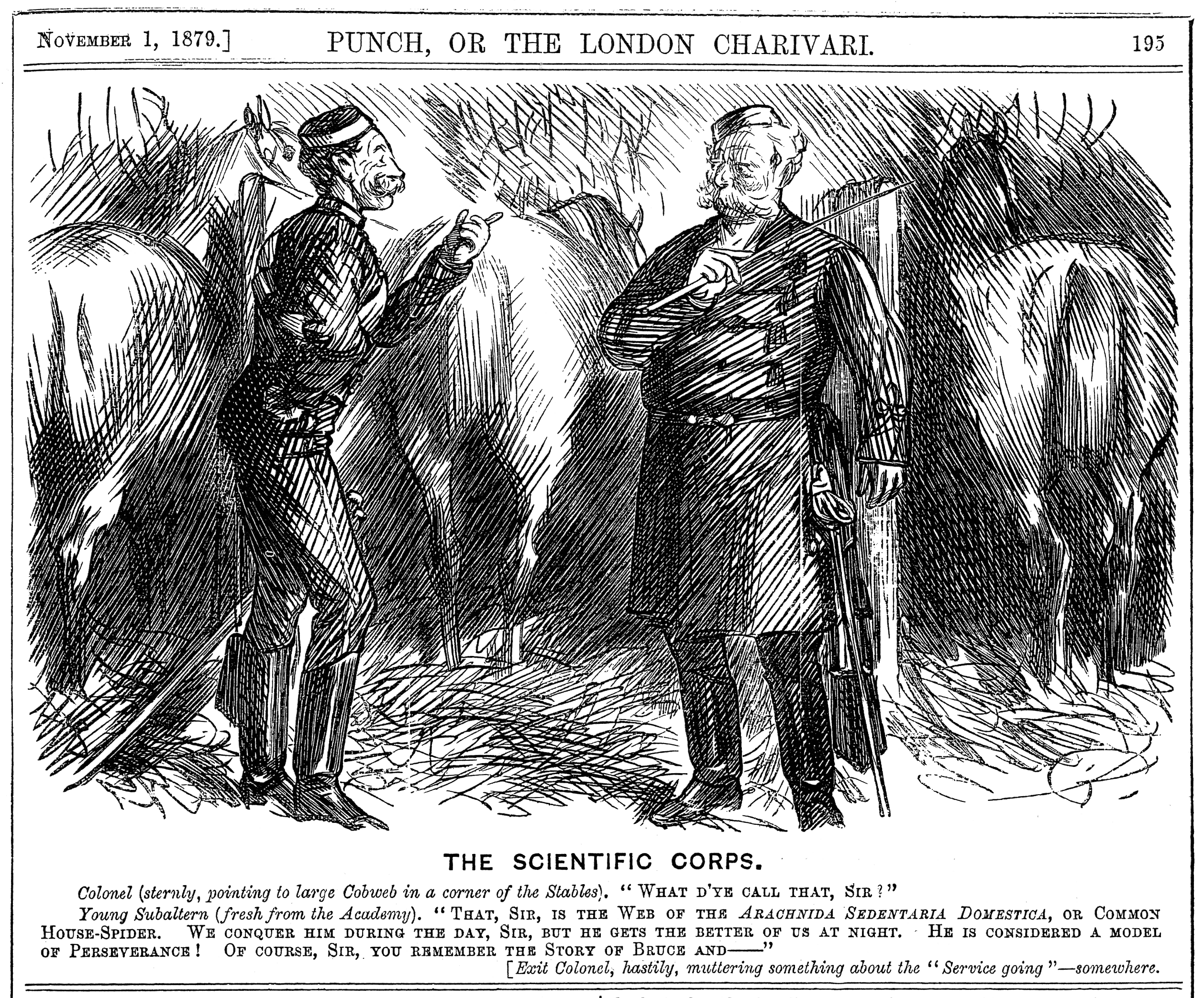
One of the Punch cartoons featuring the colonel

The Colonel is a farce in three acts by F. C. Burnand based on Jean François Bayard's Le mari à la campagne (The Husband in the Country), first produced in 1844 and produced in London in 1849 by Morris Barnett, adapted as The Serious Family. The story concerns the efforts of two aesthetic impostors to gain control of a family fortune by converting a man's wife and mother-in-law to follow aestheticism. The man is so unhappy that he seeks the company of a widow in town. His friend, an American colonel, intervenes to persuade the wife to return to conventional behavior and obey her husband to restore domestic harmony, and the colonel marries the widow.

The Colonel was first produced on 2 February 1881, and its initial run at the Prince of Wales's Theatre lasted for 550 performances, an extraordinary run in those days. Simultaneously, a second company was touring the British provinces with the play. On 4 October 1881, The Colonel received a command performance before Queen Victoria (the first play to do so in twenty years (since the death of Prince Albert in 1861). The play transferred to the Imperial Theatre in 1883 and then to the new Prince of Wales Theatre in 1884, built by the producer of The Colonel, Edgar Bruce, from the profits from the comedy's extraordinary success. In July 1887, there was a revival at the Comedy Theatre.

== Background ==
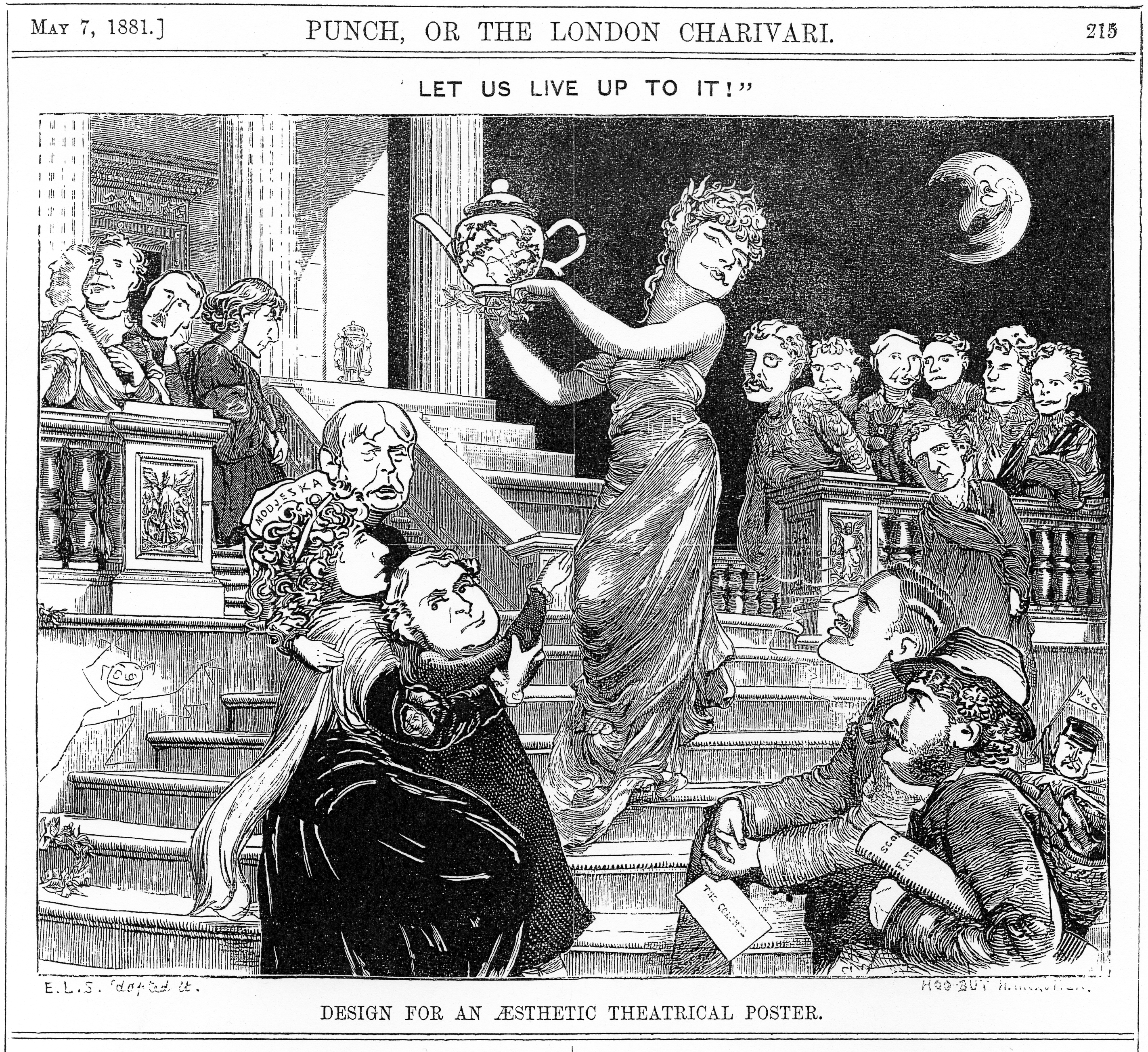
Theatrical poster from Punch shortly after the première of Patience and The Colonel

The play, like the Bayard play on which it is based, follows a Tartuffe-type plot: a wealthy family is infiltrated by a religious impostor who threatens to gain control over the family fortune until an old friend comes to the rescue – in this version, an American colonel, the title character of the play. A young husband generally uses the pretence of going to the country to escape his oppressive domestic circumstances. The old friend restores the husband's supremacy in his home by pointing out to the misguided wife the dangers inherent in suppressing innocent and fashionable pleasures in the name of an exaggerated devotion. Burnand's most important modification to this plot consisted in substituting "aesthetic" impostors for the religious hypocrites of the earlier versions – a fake "professor of aesthetics" is pitted against the practical American colonel.

Squire Bancroft, manager of the Haymarket Theatre had asked Burnand, a prolific dramatic author who produced nearly 200 stage works, to create a new version of Bayard's story. Bancroft, however, decided not to stage the play, giving Burnand more license to freely adapt it. The "aesthetic craze" was an obvious target for Burnand, who had been a regular contributor to Punch since 1863 and had become its editor in 1880 (a position he held until 1906). Beginning in the late 1870s, George du Maurier had published a long series of cartoons in the magazine satirizing the aesthetes. "The Colonel" was a recurring character in Punch. Punch had so frequently attacked the aesthetic movement, as The Observer noted, that The Colonel came at a point when it "might, indeed, have been thought that Punch had well nigh played the subject out." Fun, a rival publication, wryly noted that Burnand should have acknowledged du Maurier as co-author. According to Burnand's memoir, Frederic Clay leaked the information to him that Gilbert and Sullivan were working on an "æsthetic subject", and so Burnand raced to produce the play before the operatic duo's Patience opened.

== Roles and original cast ==
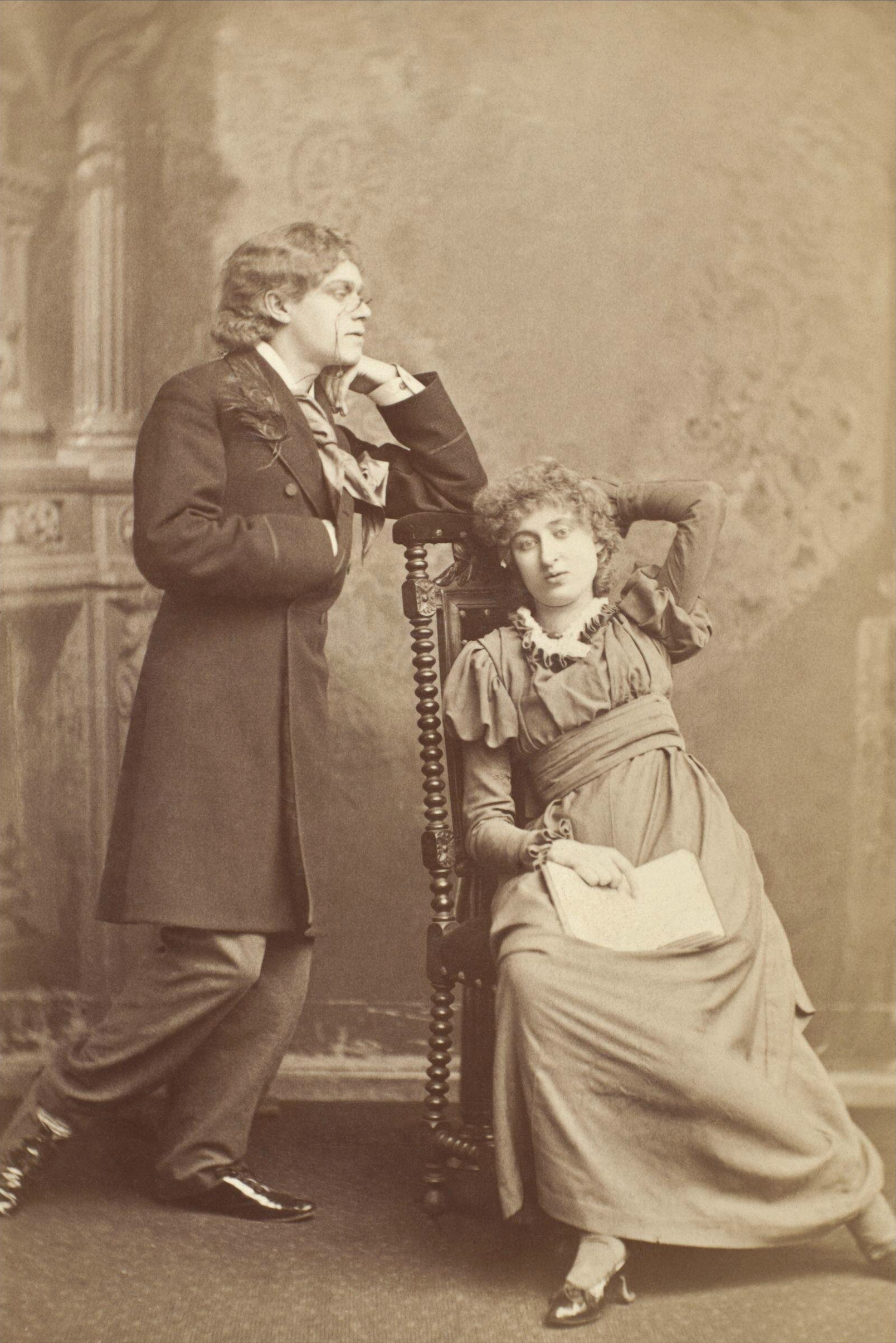
Rowland Buckstone and Cissy Grahame reprising their roles in the 1887 revival

- Colonel Wootwell W. Wood, U.S. Cavalry – Charles Francis Coghlan
- Richard Forrester – W. Herbert
- Lambert Strekye – James Fernandez
- Basil Giorgione (his Nephew) – Rowland Buckstone
- Edward Langton [in love with Nellie] – Eric Bayley
- Mullins [Butler] – Mr. Rowley
- Parkes (Waiter) – Charles Cecil
- Romelli [Restaurateur & Confectioner] – Mr. Grey
- Lady Tompkins – Mrs. Leigh Murray
- Olive (her Daughter, Forrester's Wife) – Myra Holme
- Nellie (Forrester's Sister [and Ward]) – Cissy Grahame
- Mrs. Blythe – Amy Roselle
- Goodall (her Maid) – Miss Houston

== Notes ==
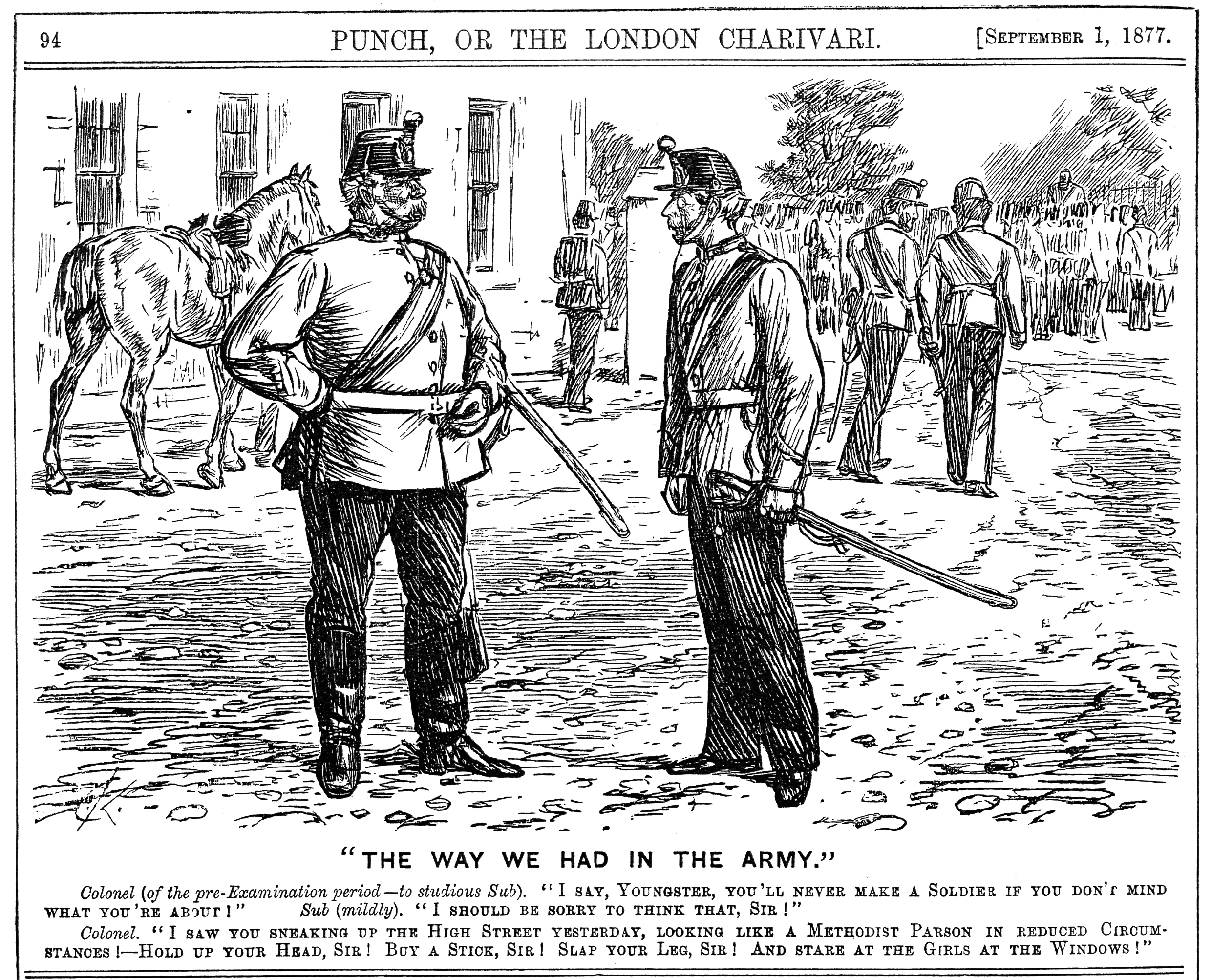
Another Punch cartoon
