= Royal Command Performance =

Annual performance in Britain

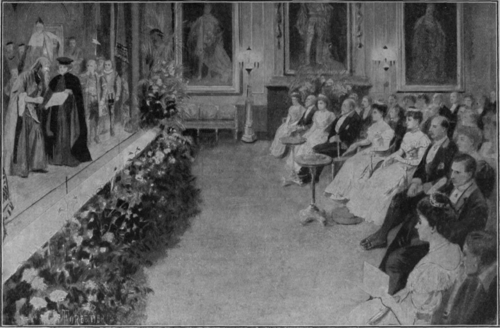
Command Performance, 1905 at Windsor Castle: The Merchant of Venice, performed by Arthur Bourchier's company

A Royal Command Performance is any performance by actors or musicians that occurs at the direction or request of a reigning monarch of the United Kingdom.

Although English monarchs have long sponsored their own theatrical companies and commissioned theatrical performances, the first Royal Command Performance to bear that name was staged at Windsor Castle in 1848 by order of Queen Victoria. From then on, command performances were frequently staged, often calling upon the leading actors from the London theatres, until the death of Prince Albert in 1861. There were no further command performances until they recommenced in 1881. These included plays, revues, comic operas and other musical theatre. King Edward VII called for several performances each year.

In 1911 a Great "Gala" performance was given by the theatrical profession at His Majesty's Theatre in London in celebration of the coronation of King George V. In 1912, George V and Queen Mary attended an all-star Royal Command Performance at London's Palace Theatre in aid of the Variety Artistes' Benevolent Fund, and the following year it was decided to make the evening an annual event.

1919 saw the first event to be named the Royal Variety Performance, and a variety of entertainment, including music (of all genres), comedy, dance, music-hall and speciality acts were included. The monarch or a senior member of the British Royal attends the event each year, and the event continues as a fundraiser for the Royal Variety Charity. The Royal Variety Performance attracts over 150 million worldwide television viewers annually.

== Early history ==
As long as there has been a monarchy, kings and queens have maintained minstrels and jesters to entertain their courts, and these performances could be called "command performances". The history of the command performance as we recognise it today dates back at least to the time of Queen Elizabeth I, during whose reign the first permanent theatre was built. In addition, Elizabeth built her own theatre where she could watch plays performed by her own company of players. This was formed in 1583 by Edmund Tilney, the then Master of the Revels, and was known as Queen Elizabeth's Men.

Later British monarchs continued the tradition of sponsoring their own theatrical companies until the dissolution of the monarchy, with its subsequent abolition of the theatre, during the Protectorship of Oliver Cromwell. The restoration of the monarchy following the death of Cromwell also resulted in the restoration of the relationship between the monarch and theatre.

== Modern British command performances ==
The Gondoliers performed before Queen Victoria at Windsor Castle in 1891

At the beginning of Queen Victoria's reign in 1837 the command performance was an established part of Britain's theatrical life. The first Royal Command Performance as it is known today is generally accepted to have been that staged at Windsor Castle on 28 December 1848 by order of Queen Victoria. The play was The Merchant of Venice, and the cast included Mr and Mrs Charles Kean, Mr and Mrs Keeley, Henry Lowe, Leigh Murray and Alfred Wigan. From then on, command performances were frequently staged, often calling upon the leading actors from the London theatres and their supporting casts, until the death of Prince Albert in December 1861.

There were no further command performances until they recommenced on 4 October 1881 with a production of Burnand's The Colonel. Queen Victoria called for a command performance of W. S. Gilbert's play Sweethearts (together with Uncle's Will) on 1 February 1887, starring Mr and Mrs Kendal. The great Shakespearean actors Henry Irving and Ellen Terry performed for the Queen in 1889 and 1893. In 1891, the Queen enjoyed two performances by the D'Oyly Carte Opera Company of Gilbert and Sullivan operas, namely The Gondoliers on 6 March 1891 at Windsor Castle and The Mikado on 4 September 1891 at Balmoral. Performances of operas by the Royal Opera Company and the Carl Rosa Opera Company were given on several occasions in the 1890s for Victoria.

On 21 July 1896 the first Royal Command Film Performance was held at Marlborough House. The film showed the Prince and Princess of Wales visiting the Cardiff Exhibition. When Birt Acres, the cinematographer, requested permission to show the film to the general public the Prince asked to see it himself before agreeing. The film was screened before forty royal guests in a specially erected marquee along with a collection of other short films. King Edward VII called for several performances per year. These included Quality Street by the company of husband and wife stars Ellaline Terriss and Seymour Hicks and plays by Sir Charles Wyndham's company and Arthur Bourchier's company. Sir Herbert Beerbohm Tree's company played for both Victoria and Edward during their respective reigns.

On 27 June 1911 a Great 'Gala' performance was given by the theatrical profession at His Majesty's Theatre in London in celebration of the coronation of King George V. The proceeds from this event were used to found the 'King George's Pension Fund for Actors and Actresses'. A second Royal Command Performance was held on 1 July 1912, featuring many of the leading stars of the theatre and music halls, in aid of the Variety Artistes' Benevolent Fund, now the Royal Variety Charity. From 1913, it was decided to make this a regular annual 'all-star' event to continue contributing to the fund. The 1913 show was a production of the Dion Boucicault comedy London Assurance at St James's Theatre on 27 June 1913 and raised £1,093. These events are now called Royal Variety Performances.

1919 saw the first event to be named the Royal Variety Performance. The reason for the name change followed desire from Buckingham Palace that the show should 'clearly reflect all areas of show business popular amongst the masses of the time'. Hence, a variety of entertainment, including music (of all genres), comedy, dance, music-hall and speciality acts, rather than for it be incorrectly perceived as one reflecting the Royal Family's own specific choice of artistes.

King George V became patron of the Royal Variety Charity in 1921 and decreed that the monarch or a senior member of the British Royal family would attend an annual event in aid of the Royal Variety Charity and its care home for elderly entertainers, Brinsworth House, once a year thereafter. This tradition and fundraising event for the Royal Variety Charity, continues to the present day, with the Royal Variety Performance now attracting over 150 million worldwide television viewers, making it the longest running and most successful entertainment show in the world.

== See also ==
- Royal Variety Performance
