= Alice in Wonderland (musical) =

Musical by H. Savile Clarke, Walter Slaughter and Aubrey Hopwood

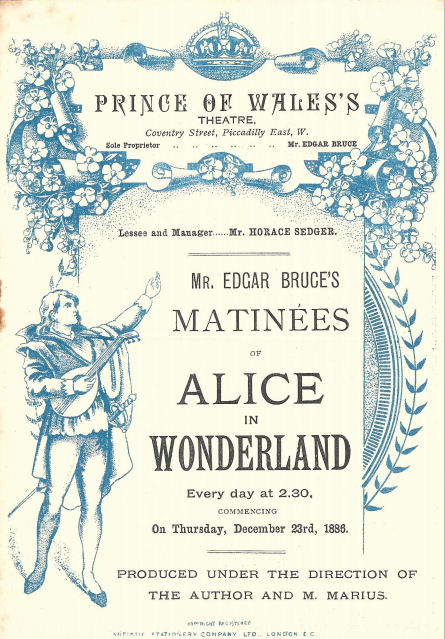
- Programme for the original production of Alice in Wonderland (1886)
- Music: Walter Slaughter
- Lyrics: Lewis Carroll and Henry Savile Clarke
- Book: H. Savile Clarke
- Basis: Lewis Carroll's novels Alice's Adventures in Wonderland and Through the Looking-Glass
- Productions: 1886 West End; West End revivals in 1888, 1898, 1900, 1906, 1907, 1909, 1910, 1913, 1914, 1915, 1916, 1917, 1920, 1921, and 1922

Alice in Wonderland is a musical by Henry Savile Clarke (book and lyrics) and Walter Slaughter (music), based on Lewis Carroll's books Alice's Adventures in Wonderland (1865) and Through the Looking-Glass (1871). It debuted at the Prince of Wales's Theatre in the West End on 23 December 1886. Aubrey Hopwood (lyrics) and Walter Slaughter (music) wrote additional songs which were first used for the 1900 revival.

The piece, billed as "A musical dream play in two acts", achieved considerable popularity. At Carroll's request, Slaughter retained the old tunes in the parodies such as "Bonny Dundee".

== Background ==
There were several amateur productions of Alice after the book's publication, and Carroll himself considered dramatizing the story for the professional stage. In 1877 he wrote to Arthur Sullivan (of Gilbert and Sullivan) in an attempt to persuade him to write the songs for a musical production. Sullivan was interested in the idea and proposed that he would compose a score to Carroll's libretto. Carroll hesitated, partly at the high fee Sullivan suggested for his work. Wanting to know what he would get for his money, Carroll suggested that Sullivan first score a song or two. After this the proposed collaboration fizzled out.

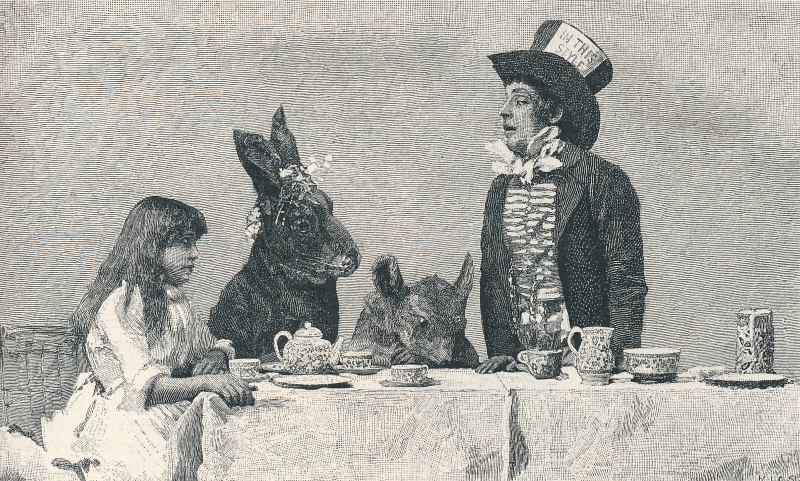
Phoebe Carlo as Alice, Edgar Norton as Hare, Dorothy D'Alcourt as Dormouse and Sydney Harcourt as Hatter in the original production (1886)

In August 1886 the dramatist and critic Henry Savile Clarke wrote to Carroll asking to adapt Alice in Wonderland for the stage. Carroll gave permission but with several stipulations:

There are one or two wishes on the subject, which I will name for your consideration: but the only essential consideration is that I should have your written guarantee that, neither in the libretto nor in any of the stage business, should any coarseness, or anything suggestive of coarseness, be admitted. ... This piece ought to be an Operetta (like The Mikado) and not a Pantomime.

Carroll was involved completely in the production from beginning to end, offering advice on everything from the adaptation of the novel to choosing the cast. He chose the child actress Phoebe Carlo for the title role, bought her costumes at his own expense and sent her to the actress Kate Terry for lessons in elocution. Dorothy D'Alcourt, who played the Dormouse, was aged 6 1/2.

The production opened on 23 December 1886 at the Prince of Wales's Theatre in London. The Theatre described the piece as a pantomime but wrote in its review, "Alice in Wonderland will not appeal to the children alone. ... Mr. Savile Clarke has done wonders. ... The play is beautifully mounted, and splendidly acted, Miss Phœbe Carlo being very successful as the little heroine... she played in a delightful and thoroughly artistic fashion, and in this respect she was closely followed by a tiny mite, Miss Dorothy D'Alcort, who plays first the Dormouse. ... Mr. Edgar Bruce, Mr. Walter Slaughter (who has written some charming music for the piece), and Mr. Savile Clarke, all deserve unstinted praise." The piece was frequently revived over the next four decades.

== Synopsis ==
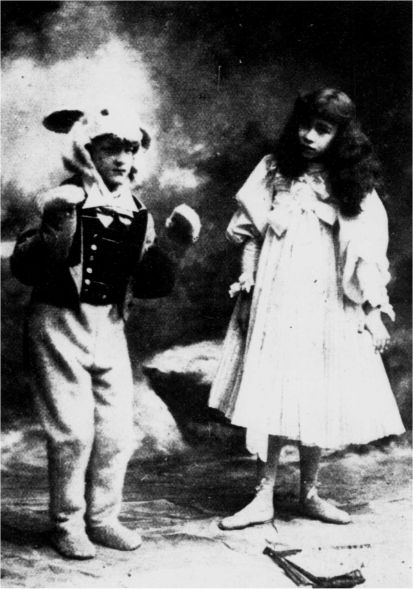
1898 revival: Rose Hersee talking to the White Rabbit

Act I, "Alice's Adventures in Wonderland", is in two scenes: "A Forest in Autumn" and "A Glade in Wonderland". Act II, "Through the Looking Glass", consists of four scenes: "Through the Looking Glass"; "The Garden of Live Flowers"; "A Sea-Shore"; and "The Banqueting Hall – The Forest Again." A review in The Theatre summarised the story as follows:

The story runs glibly, opening with a chorus of fairies surrounding Alice asleep in a chair beneath a tree, from there we progress splendidly, making a new acquaintance with all our old friends, the White Rabbit, the Caterpillar, the duchess with her Baby, the Cook with her reckless use of pepper, the Cheshire Cat with his remarkable smile, the Hatter, the Hare, and the Dormouse, who have their perpetual tea party, and treat Alice to conundrums and unconventional rudeness. Then comes a long and brilliant procession, which should fill Alice's heart with awe, if not with admiration, but our heroine is nothing daunted by this large crowd. "Why, they're only a pack of cards," she says, "I needn't be afraid of them?" and so she answers the sanguinary-minded queen of Hearts, in a reckless manner, and refuses to see heads knocked off in such profusion. She then dances with the Cards in a graceful gavotte, and afterwards protects her old friend, the Cheshire Cat, from an undeserved execution. The Gryphon and Mock Turtle then appear, and Alice receives some hints as to a sea education, and the first act of the dream play for children ends with the trial of the Knave of Hearts for eating the tarts, in which Alice's verdict of acquittal is unanimously passed.

In the second act, Mr. Savile Clarke takes us to another book, Through the Looking-Glass, and Alice is introduced to the chessmen and Chorus, who dance stiffly for her delectation, then the Red Queen gives her some advice after she has spoken to the live flowers, and Tweedledum and Tweedledee appear. She soon makes friends with these massive twins, and pleads hard when they determine to have a mortal combat, but all to no purpose, and so after she has witnessed the greedy Carpenter and Walrus devour their daily portion of oysters, she assists in arming Tweedledum and Tweedledee for the fray. The arrival of a Crow sends the warriors to speedy flight, and Humpty Dumpty appears on his wall, and so the play goes on until we see Alice once more asleep in her chair, and hear her wake to say, "Oh! I've had such a curious dream!"

== Songs from the 1906 piano/vocal score ==
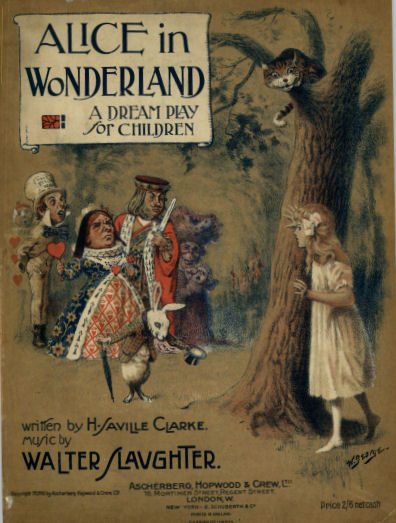
Score for Alice in Wonderland (1906)

=== Act I – In Wonderland ===
- No. 1. Chorus – "Sleep, Alice, sleep as we circle around thee"
- No. 2. Alice – "How doth the little crocodile improve his shining tail"
- No. 3. Alice – "'You are old, Father William,' the young man said"
- No. 4. Duchess – "Speak roughly to your little boy and beat him when he sneezes"
- No. 5. Alice & Cheshire Cat – "Cheshire Pussy thanks to thee"
- No. 6. Hare, Hatter and Alice – "The poor Hatter's very mad, so they say, so they say"
- No. 6a. March
- No. 7. Gavotte of Cards – "King, Queen and Knave, here we are seen, dancing."
- No. 7a. Entrance of Executioner – "Here comes the Executioner!"
- No. 8. Executioner's Chorus, with Queen and King – "He is the executioner"
- No. 9. Mock-Turtle – "Beautiful soup, so rich and green"
- No. 10. Gryphon – "'Will you walk a little faster,' said a whiting to a snail"
- No. 11. Alice – "'Tis the voice of the lobster I hear him declare"
- No. 12. Finale Act I – "'Not guilty,' I declare"

=== Act II – Through the Looking-Glass ===
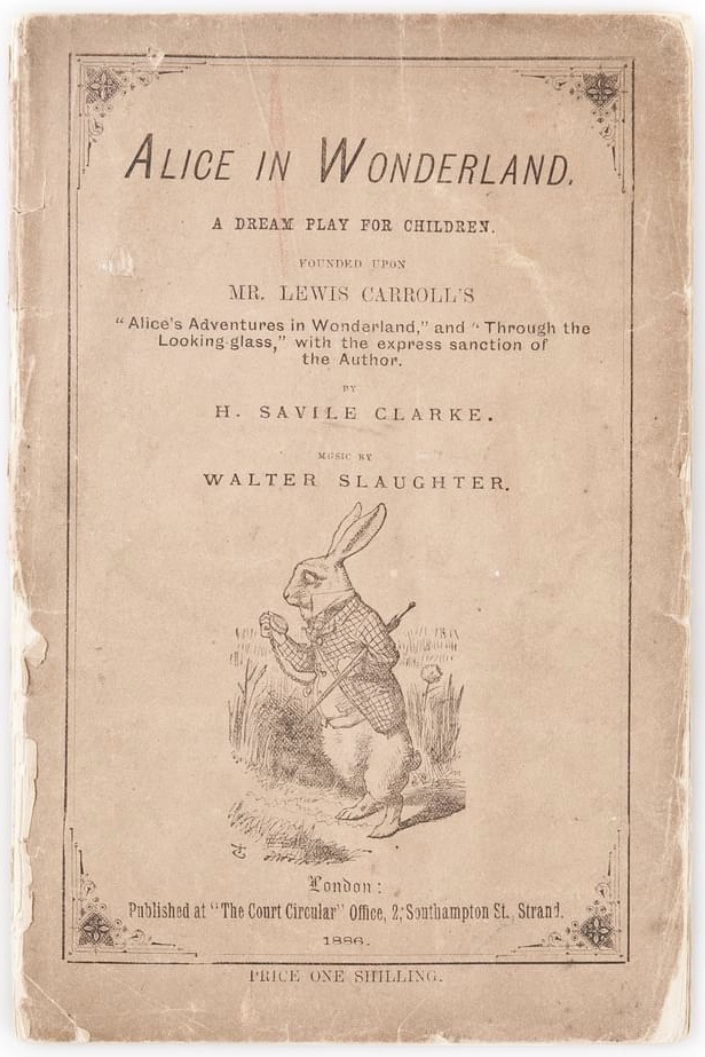
Libretto for the original production (1886)

- No. 1. Chorus – "Here ranged in due order of battle we stand with Red King and White King and Queens on each hand"
- No. 2. Red Queen – "'Twas brillig and the slithy toves did gyre and gimble in the wabe"
- No. 2a. Entrance of Lily and Rose
- No. 2b. Entrance
- No. 2c. Exit
- No. 2d. Waltz – Alice and Flowers
- No. 2e. Hatter's Entrance
- No. 2f. Alice – "Tell me why you look so wild and strange"
- No. 3. "Tweedle-Dum and Tweedle-Dee agreed to have a battle"
- No. 4. Chorus – "Here we go round the Mulberry bush"
- No. 4a. Entrance of Walrus and Carpenter
- Nos. 5 & 6. Oyster Scene – "The Carpenter is sleeping, the butter's on his face"
- No. 7. Alice – "Humpty Dumpty sat on a wall, Humpty Dumpty had a great fall"
- No. 8. Chorus of Children – "Humpty Dumpty's fallen down, Humpty Dumpty, Humpty Dumpty's broke his crown"
- No. 9. Chorus – "The Lion and the Unicorn were fighting for the Crown"
- No. 10. Hatter – "When the wind is in the East, on new-laid eggs I always feast!"
- No. 10a. Change of Scene
- No. 11. Chorus – "Sound the festal trumpets, set the bells a-ringing"
- No. 12. Finale – "Alice's health, long life and wealth, never a monarch so mighty was seen"

=== Supplementary numbers ===
- "Flowerland" – "Flow'rs awake from out your long repose, snowdrops peep from under Winter's snow"
- "Naughty Little Bunny" – "When a rabbit's good as gold, always does what he is told"

== Original cast (1886) ==
=== Act I – Alice's Adventures in Wonderland / Act II – Through the Looking-Glass ===
- Alice – Phoebe Carlo
- White Rabbit/Red King – Master D. Abrahams
- Caterpillar/ Unicorn – Master S. Solomon
- Duchess/Lily – Florence Levey
- Cook/White King – Anna Abrahams
- Cheshire Cat/ Lion – Charles Adeson
- Hatter/Tweedledum – Sidney Harcourt
- Hare – Edgar Norton
- Dormouse/Plum Pudding – Dorothy D'Alcourt
- King of Hearts/White Knight – Stephen Adeson
- Queen of Hearts/Red Queen – Mdlle. Rosa
- Knave of Hearts/White Queen – Kitty Abrahams
- Executioner/The Carpenter – Mr. H. H. H. Cameron
- Gryphon/The Walrus – Charles Bowland
- Mock Turtle/Humpty Dumpty – William Cheesman

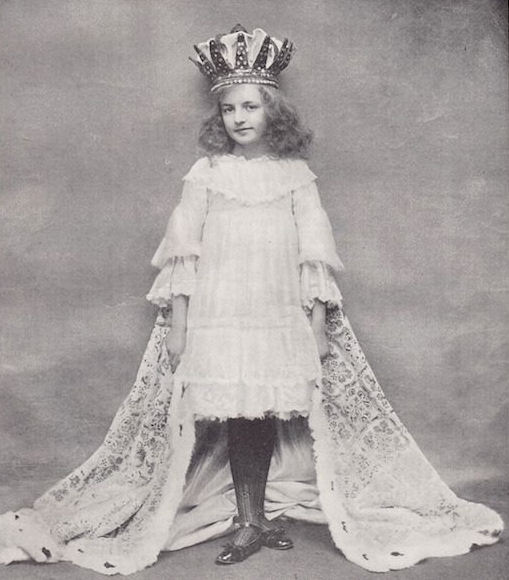
Maidie Andrews as Alice in Alice Through the Looking-Glass – The Tatler (January 1904)

- Rose – Mabel Love
- Red Knight – C. Kitts
- Tweedledee – John Ettinson
- Leg of Mutton – Master Hood

== Subsequent productions ==
The musical was frequently revived during West End Christmas seasons during the four decades after its premiere. London productions were mounted at the Globe Theatre in 1888, with Isa Bowman as Alice; the Opera Comique in 1898; the Vaudeville Theatre in 1900, with some new lyrics by Aubrey Hopwood and music by Slaughter; the Metropole Theatre, Camberwell in 1902; the Prince of Wales's Theatre (1906); the Royal Court Theatre in 1909; the Savoy Theatre in 1910; the Comedy Theatre in 1913; the Savoy in 1914; the Duke of York's Theatre in 1915; the Savoy in 1916; and the Garrick Theatre in 1921.

Adult actors who appeared along with the mainly juvenile casts included Irene Vanbrugh as the Knave of Hearts (1888); Ellaline Terriss as Alice and Seymour Hicks as the Hatter (1900); Marie Studholme as Alice, Alice Barth as the Duchess and the Red Queen, Stanley Brett as the Mad Hatter and J. C. Buckstone as Tweedledee at the Prince of Wales's Theatre (1906); Dan Leno Jr (1909, in a production conducted by Marjorie Slaughter, the composer's daughter); and C. Hayden Coffin as the Hatter (1913 and 1921).

== See also ==
- Works based on Alice in Wonderland
