= Woman-Proof =

1923 film

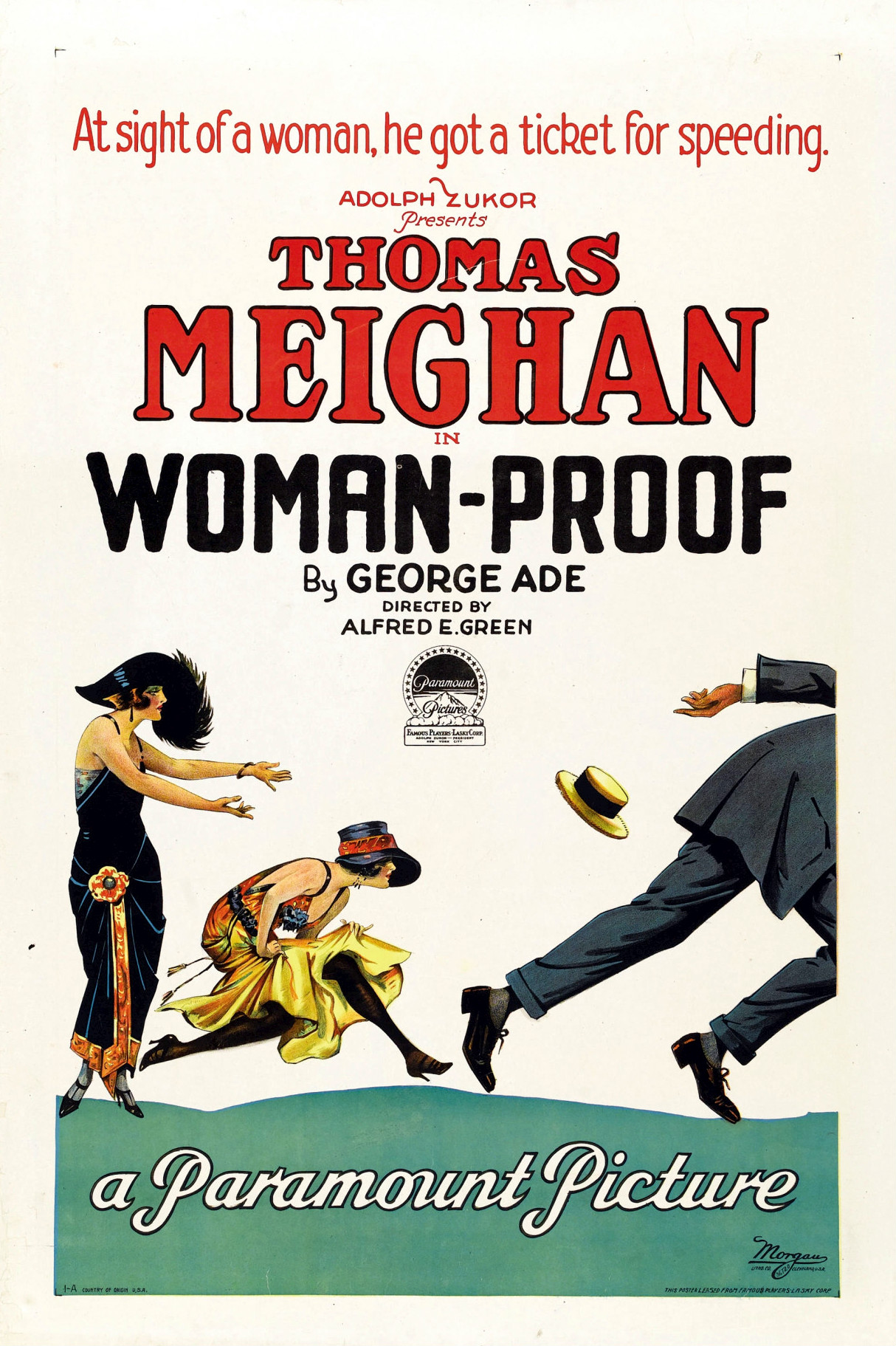
- Theatrical release poster
- Directed by: Alfred E. Green
- Screenplay by: George Ade; Thomas J. Geraghty
- Produced by: Adolph Zukor
- Starring: Thomas Meighan; Lila Lee; John St. Polis; Louise Dresser; Robert Agnew; Mary Astor; Edgar Norton
- Cinematography: Ernest Haller
- Production company: Famous Players–Lasky Corporation
- Distributed by: Paramount Pictures
- Release date: October 28, 1923
- Running time: 80 minutes
- Country: United States
- Language: Silent (English intertitles)

Woman-Proof is a 1923 American silent comedy film directed by Alfred E. Green and written by Thomas J. Geraghty based upon a play by George Ade. The film stars Thomas Meighan, Lila Lee, John St. Polis, Louise Dresser, Robert Agnew, Mary Astor, and Edgar Norton. The film was released on October 28, 1923, by Paramount Pictures.

== Cast ==
- Thomas Meighan as Tom Rockwood
- Lila Lee as Louise Halliday
- John St. Polis as Milo Bleech
- Louise Dresser as Wilma Rockwood
- Robert Agnew as Dick Rockwood
- Mary Astor as Violet Lynwood
- Edgar Norton as Cecil Updyke
- Charles Sellon as Uncle Joe Gloomer
- George O'Brien as Bill Burleigh
- Vera Reynolds as Celeste Rockwood
- Hardee Kirkland as Colonel Lynwood
- Martha Mattox as Wistful Wooer
- William Gonder as Isaac Diirge
- Mike Donlin as Foreman

== Production ==
It took three months for the cast to be selected, and production began on July 23, 1923, at the Famous Players-Lasky Studios. The tunnel-blasting taking place at Huntington Lake, California, was used a backdrop for several scenes in the film. The Solar eclipse of September 10, 1923 occurred while filming aboard a ship off the coast of California, and the sudden darkness was used to film night scenes. Additional scenes were taken on San Francisco's waterfront. The working title was All Must Marry.

== Preservation ==
With no prints of Woman-Proof located in any film archives, it is a lost film.
