= Isa Bowman =

British actress (1874–1958)

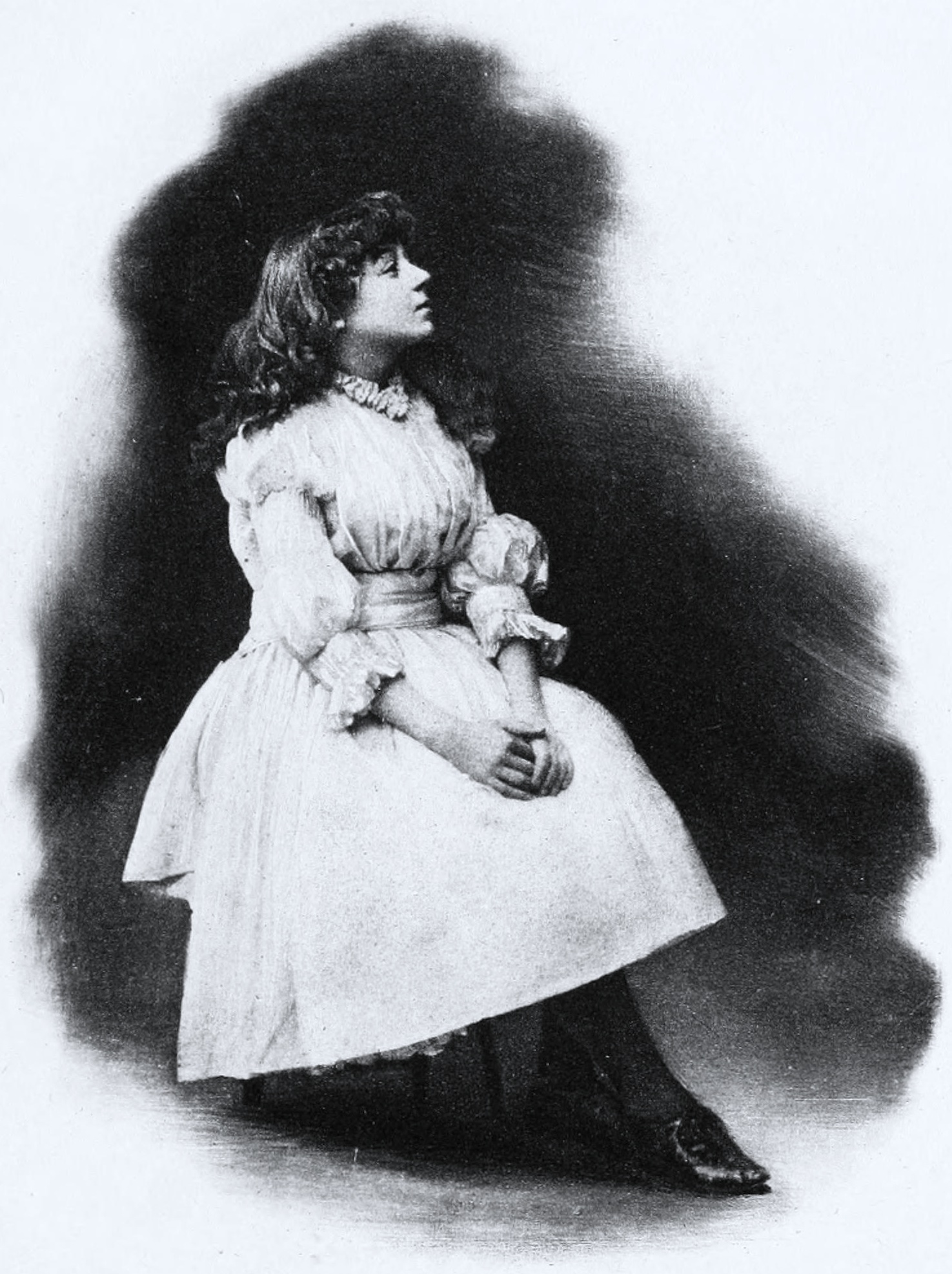
Isa Bowman as the part of Alice in 1888

Isabella Holmes Bowman (1874–1958) was an English actress, a close friend of Lewis Carroll and author of a memoir about his life, The Story of Lewis Carroll, Told for Young People by the Real Alice in Wonderland.

She met Carroll in 1886 when she played a small part in the stage version of Alice in Wonderland with Phoebe Carlo in the title role: she replaced Carlo as Alice in the 1888 revival. She visited and stayed with him between the ages of fifteen and nineteen: Carroll described a visit in July 1888 in Isa's Visit to Oxford, which she reprinted in her memoir. Carroll introduced her to Ellen Terry, who gave her elocution lessons. Carroll dedicated his last novel Sylvie and Bruno to her in 1889: her name appears in a double acrostic poem in the introduction.

She married the journalist George Reginald Bacchus in 1899. In 1899–1900 Bacchus published a fictionalised version of her life in Society, a magazine he was editing. The publisher Leonard Smithers then commissioned a pornographic version which was published as The Confessions of Nemesis Hunt (issued in three volumes 1902, 1903, 1906).

Isa Bowman was the daughter of Charles Andrew Bowman (b. 1851), a music teacher, and Helen Herd, née Holmes. Her sisters, Empsie, Nellie (Mrs Spens) and Maggie (Mrs Tom Morton) Bowman were all actresses, and also friends of Carroll. According to Maggie's father-in-law, William Morton, the sisters were all actresses from a very early age. He said that Maggie had an amusing diary in rhyme written by Carroll about her visit to Oxford as a young child.

Isa played a small part in the 1949 British film Vote for Huggett, together with her sisters Empsie and Nellie.

== In popular culture ==
- Gyles Brandreth's play Wonderland about the relationship between Isa Bowman and Dodgson was performed at the Edinburgh Festival Fringe in 2010.
