= Phoebe Carlo =

English actress

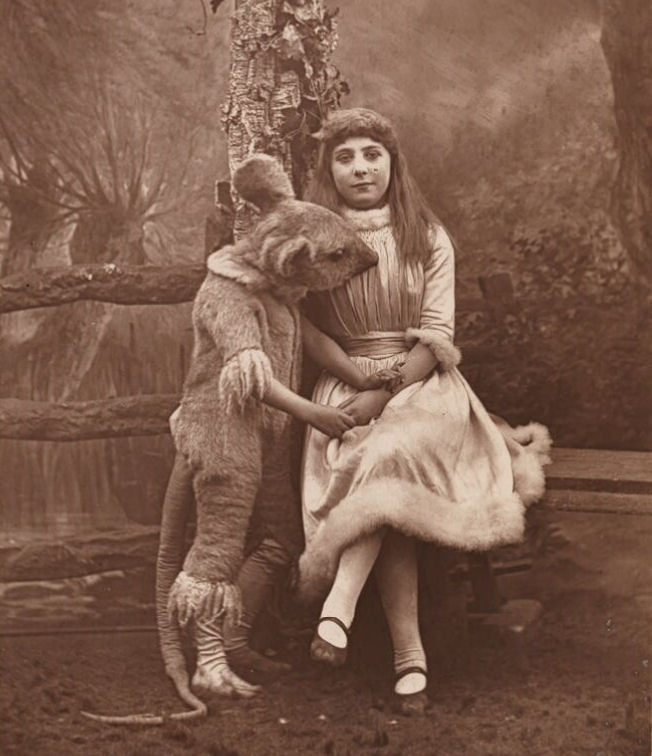
- Phobe Carlo as Alice and Dorothy D'Alcourt as the Dormouse in Alice in Wonderland - Herbert Rose Barraud (1887)
- Born: Phoebe Ellen Carlo; May 30, 1874; Lambeth, London, England
- Died: July 23, 1941 (aged 67); London, England
- Occupation: Stage actress

Phoebe Ellen Carlo (30 May 1874 – 23 July 1941) was an English actress of the late Victorian era. She is most notable for playing Alice in the musical Alice in Wonderland (1886), making her the first actress to play the titular character in a professional production of Lewis Carroll's Alice's Adventures in Wonderland (1865), having been personally selected by the author for the role.

== Biography ==
She was born in Lambeth in London in 1874, one of two daughters of William Carlo (born 1839), a packer and porter, and his wife Phoebe Emma née Rawlings (1852–1926), an actress. In 1881 she was being educated at the Walnut Tree Walk School in Lambeth.

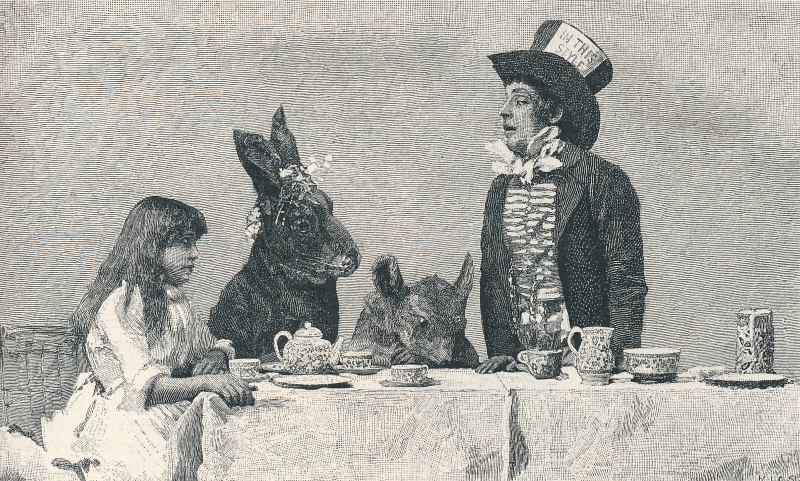
Phoebe Carlo as Alice, Edgar Norton as Hare, Dorothy D'Alcourt as Dormouse and Sidney Harcourt as Hatter in Alice in Wonderland

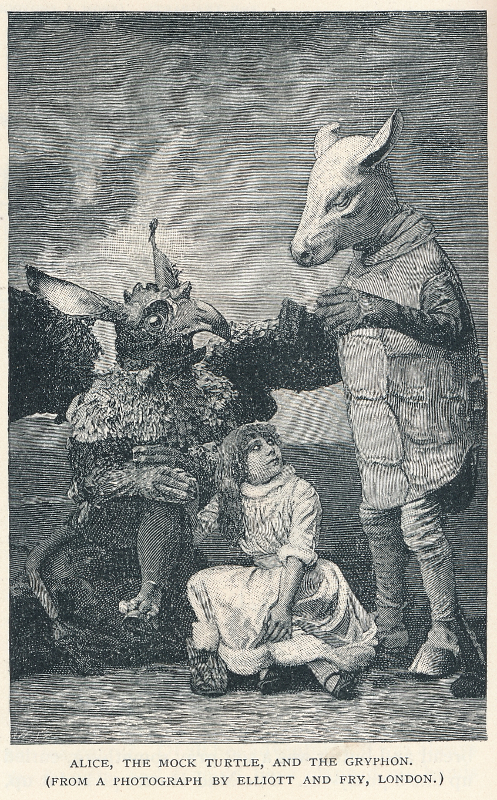
Carlo as Alice with William M. Cheesman as the Mock Turtle and Charles Bowland as the Gryphon in Alice in Wonderland

Already an experienced child actress having played Margery Daw in the pantomime Jack and the Beanstalk in Brighton in 1878 aged 4 years, aged 12 Carlo was cast as Alice in the original production of the musical Alice in Wonderland, which played from 23 December 1886 to 2 March 1887 at the Prince of Wales Theatre in London to positive reviews, with the critic for The Theatre writing, "Miss Phœbe Carlo being very successful as the little heroine... she played in a delightful and thoroughly artistic fashion, and in this respect she was closely followed by a tiny mite, Miss Dorothy D'Alcort, who plays first the Dormouse. ..." Another reviewer wrote, "Mr. Clarke was fortunate in securing the services of that clever child-actress, Miss Phoebe Carlo, as the heroine. Miss Carlo was safe and reliable in the part, and, by her acting, made up for her not very good singing voice."

From March 1887 she continued to play the character in a regional tour until the last performance on 17 August that year, following which adverts were placed announcing that Phoebe Carlo was “at liberty” from 20 August 1887.

Charles Dodgson (Lewis Carroll) had first seen Carlo on New Year's Day 1883 when, aged 8, she was appearing at the Avenue Theatre in Joseph Cave's pantomime Dick Whittington and His Cat, which he returned to see twice again. Next she played Ned in Henry Arthur Jones's The Silver King, which Carroll saw three times, following which he called at her family home where he met her and her mother, receiving permission from the latter to take Carlo to the Royal Academy to see Holman Hunt's Triumph of the Innocents. She became one of his child friends and received an invitation to visit him during his holiday at Eastbourne. On 11 July 1885 Carroll recorded in his diary: "...went to town by the 9 a.m. Called on Mrs. Carlo, and talked over plan of having Phoebe down to Eastbourne." On 24 July he travelled to London by train to fetch her, returning with her to his lodgings in Lushington Road. She was 11 years old and unchaperoned.

In October 1886 Carroll saw Carlo acting in The Governess and settled on her to play Alice in his forthcoming production of Alice, dressing her at his own expense and sending her for tutoring to Kate Terry. Carroll saw his "Alice" musical at least five times, commenting in his diary after his first visit on 30 December 1886 that "Phoebe Carlo is a splendid 'Alice'. Her song and dance with the Cheshire Cat was a gem." In his 1887 article "Alice on the Stage", Carroll praised Carlo's acting, writing of her performance that:

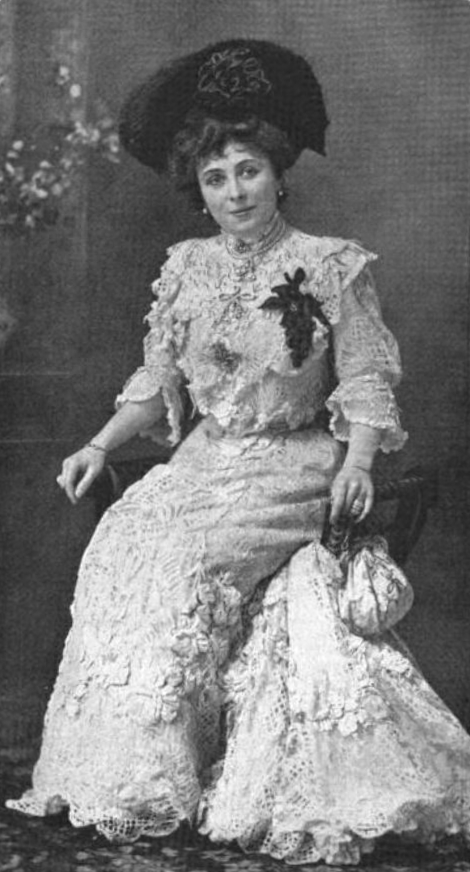
Carlo in 1903

...it would be difficult to speak too highly. As a mere effort of memory, it was surely a marvellous feat for so young a child, to learn no less than two hundred and fifteen speeches - nearly three times as many as Beatrice in Much Ado About Nothing. But what I admired most, as realising most nearly my ideal heroine, was her perfect assumption of the high spirits, and readiness to enjoy everything of a child out for a holiday. I doubt if any grown actress, however experienced, could have worn this air so perfectly.

Towards the end of the production Carroll considered Carlo was beginning "to play mechanically", and by the time of the 1888 revival he thought her "too old and too tall" to play Alice, with the role going to Isa Bowman. He wrote to Henry Savile Clarke that: "Isa's 'English' is better than Phoebe's. In one special and important point, the use of the 'H', she is altogether better... Isa looks more of a lady than Phoebe." The difference in language and deportment was a matter of upbringing, Carlo being the daughter of a packer and porter while Bowman was the daughter of a Professor of Music (a music teacher) and had been educated at a convent and private schools.

Carlo was one of the two Babes in the pantomime The Babes in the Wood produced at the Prince's Theatre, Manchester on 21 December 1889 with a cast that included Little Tich.

Phoebe Ellen Joel died in London in July 1941.
