= Elizabeth Leigh Murray =

English actor (1815–1892)

Elizabeth Leigh Murray (née Elizabeth Harriet Lee, 1815–1892) was an English actor of the Victorian period.

== Biography ==
Elizabeth Leigh Murray, born in 1815, was the daughter of Henry Lee (1765–1836), an actor, playwright and theatre manager, and his second wife Miss Lloyd. As might be expected for a theatrical family of that period, Elizabeth was placed on stage early in life, appearing in Little Pickle when five-years old, and taking roles in many of her father's productions.

She married in 1841 Henry Leigh Murray, an actor.

The Oxford Dictionary of National Biography lists a number of her adult appearance, including:

- Cupid, in an extravaganza, Cupid, at the Olympic Theatre, produced by Lucia Elizabeth Vestris
- Love's Labour's Lost, circa 1839, at Covent Garden Theatre
- Lady Staunton in The Whistler of the Glen, or, The Fate of the Lily of St Leonards, Edinburgh, billed as Miss E. Lee
- Apollo in Diogenes and his Lantern at the Strand Theatre, February 1850
- Lady Lavender in The Love Knot at Theatre Royal, Drury Lane, March 1858
- Patty in The Chimney Corner, Olympic Theatre, February 1861
- Lady Lundie in Man and Wife, based on the Wilkie Collins novel, Man and Wife, Prince of Wales's Theatre, February 1873

Besides these, she appeared in productions across England and Scotland, including joint performances with her husband. She died on 25 May 1892.
