= Edgar Norton =

Anglo-American actor

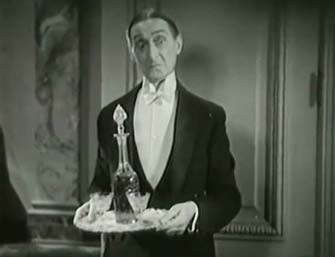
- Norton in The Lady Refuses, 1931
- Born: August 11, 1868; London, England
- Died: February 6, 1953 (aged 84); Los Angeles, California, United States
- Occupation: Actor
- Years active: 1916–1948

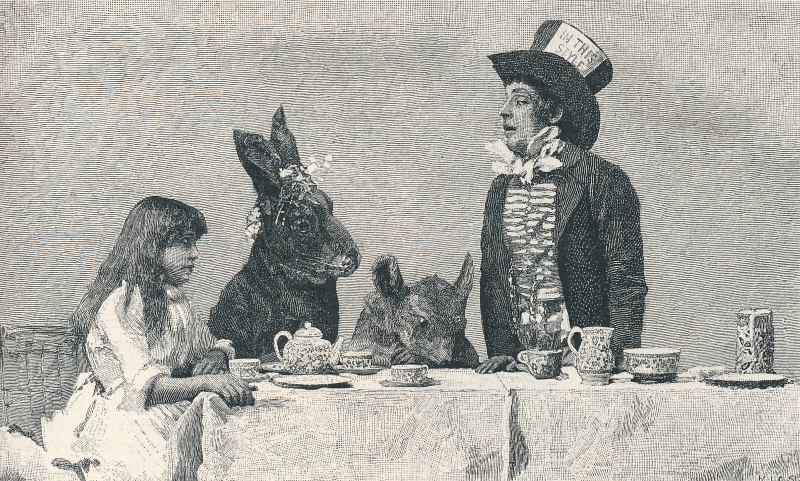
Phoebe Carlo as Alice, Edgar Norton as Hare, Dorothy D'Alcourt as Dormouse and Sydney Harcourt as Hatter in Alice in Wonderland (1886)

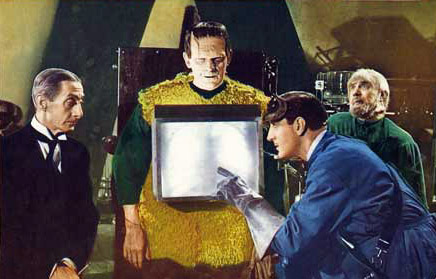
Edgar Norton, Boris Karloff, Basil Rathbone and Bela Lugosi in Son of Frankenstein (1939)

Edgar Norton (born Harry Edgar Mills; August 11, 1868 – February 6, 1953) was an English-born American character actor.

== Early years ==
Norton was born in Islington in London, England, on August 11, 1868, as Harry Edgar Mills, one of eight children of Jane Anne née Fleming and Frederic Mills, a clerk in the Home Office department of the Civil Service.

== Career ==
Norton was active on both stage and screen, his theater performances were on both the London and Broadway stages, and his film career spanned both the silent and "talkie" eras in Hollywood. Aged 18, he appeared as the Hare in the original production of Alice in Wonderland in London in 1886, with the production being under the guidance of Lewis Carroll, who saw the musical five times.

During his thirty-year film career, he appeared in at least ninety films. Many consider his most memorable role to be that of Poole, the butler to Dr. Jekyll in the 1931 classic, Dr. Jekyll and Mr. Hyde— a role he had been playing on-stage since 1898, opposite Richard Mansfield as Jekyll.

== Personal life and death ==
Norton moved permanently to the United States in 1889, and was naturalised as an American citizen in 1927. He married his Detroit-born wife Lillian Mable née Hubbard in Ontario in Canada in 1890, and with her had a son, Edgar Norton Mills.

He died in the Woodland Hills section of Los Angeles in February 1953.

== Filmography ==
(Per AFI database)

- The Ocean Waif (1916) - Valentine Borroyer
- The Beautiful Adventure (1917) - Valentine Borroyer
- The Amazons (1917) - Lord Tweenways
- A Pair of Cupids (1918) - Martin
- The New York Idea (1920) - Thomas
- The Light in the Dark (1922) - Peters
- Woman-Proof (1923) - Cecil Updyke
- Broadway After Dark (1924) - The Old Actor
- The Fast Set (1924) - Archie Wells
- The Female (1924) - Clyde Wiel
- Men (1924) - The baron
- Tiger Love (1924) - Don Victoriano Fuentes
- The Wolf Man (1924) - Sir Reginald Stackpoole
- Enticement (1925) - William Blake
- The King on Main Street (1925) - Jensen
- Learning To Love (1925) - Butler
- Lost: A Wife (1925) - Baron Deliguières
- The Marriage Whirl (1925) - Dick Mayne
- A Regular Fellow (1925) - Valet
- The Boy Friend (1926) - (uncredited)
- Diplomacy (1926) - British embassy servant
- The Lady from Hell (1926) - Hon. Charles Darnely
- Marriage License? (1927) - Beadon
- Fast and Furious (1927) - Englishman
- Singed (1927) - Ernie Whitehead
- My Friend from India (1927) - Jennings, a butler
- The Man Who Laughs (1928) - Lord High Chancellor
- Oh, Kay! (1928) - Lord Braggot
- The Student Prince in Old Heidelberg (1928) - Lutz
- The Love Parade (1929) - Master of ceremonies
- The Girl Said No (1930) - Butler
- The Man From Blankley's (1930) - Dawes
- One Romantic Night (1930) - Colonel Wunderlich
- The Runaway Bride (1930) - Williams
- The Lady of Scandal (1930) - Morton
- Monte Carlo (1930) - Minor Role (uncredited)
- A Lady Surrenders (1930) - Butler
- Charley's Aunt (1930) - Spettigue's Lawyer
- Du Barry, Woman of Passion (1930) - Renal
- East Is West (1930) - Thomas
- The Bachelor Father (1931) - Bolton
- The Lady Refuses (1931) - Dobbs
- Meet the Wife (1931) - Williams
- Compromised (1931) - Tipton
- Dr. Jekyll and Mr. Hyde (1931) - Poole
- The Man Called Back (1932) - Secretary
- Love Me Tonight (1932) - Valet
- A Lady's Profession (1933) - Crotchett
- Sing, Sinner, Sing (1933) - Roberts the butler
- The Big Brain (1933) - Butler
- The Worst Woman in Paris? (1933) - Valet
- Only Yesterday (1933) - George, the butler
- Imitation of Life (1934) - Butler
- We Live Again (1934) - Judge
- The Richest Girl in the World (1934) - The butler, Binkley
- Sons of Steel (1934) - Higgins
- Thirty Day Princess (1934) - Baron Passeria
- Million Dollar Ransom (1934) - Meigs
- Stingaree (1934) - Governor's first aide
- The Girl from 10th Avenue (1935) - Butler
- When a Man's a Man (1935) - Gibbs
- Vagabond Lady (1935) - Chauffeur
- East of Java (1935) - Resident
- Give Me Your Heart (1936) - Servant
- August Weekend (1936) - Grimsby
- Dracula's Daughter (1936) - Hobbs
- The Bohemian Girl (1936)
- 45 Fathers (1937) - Van Brunt
- You Can't Buy Luck (1937) - Rivers
- Maytime (1937) - Secretary
- Stage Door (1937) - Minor Role (uncredited)
- Bill Cracks Down (1937) - Jarvis
- The Big Broadcast of 1938 (1938) - Secretary to T. F. Bellows
- Son of Frankenstein (1939) - Thomas Benson
- Captain Fury (1939) - Governor's aide
- Rulers of the Sea (1939) - Mr. McKinnon
- The Mad Empress (1939) - (uncredited)
- A Chump at Oxford (1940) - Professor Witherspoon
- Brother Orchid (1940) - Meadows
- The House of the Seven Gables (1940) - Phineas Weed
- Rings on Her Fingers (1942) - Paul
- Happy Go Lucky (1943) - Captain of waiters
- Practically Yours (1944) - Harvey, butler
- Are These Our Parents (1944) - Butler
- The Suspect (1944) - Frazer
- Captain Kidd (1945) - Nobleman
- Doll Face (1945) - Soho, the butler
- Kitty (1946) - Earl of Campton
- Devotion (1946) - Club member
- Our Hearts Were Growing Up (1946) - Butler
- Bob, Son of Battle (1947) - Parson Leggy Hornbut
- The Woman in White (1948) - Night clerk
