= Edgar Bruce =

English actor (1845–1901)

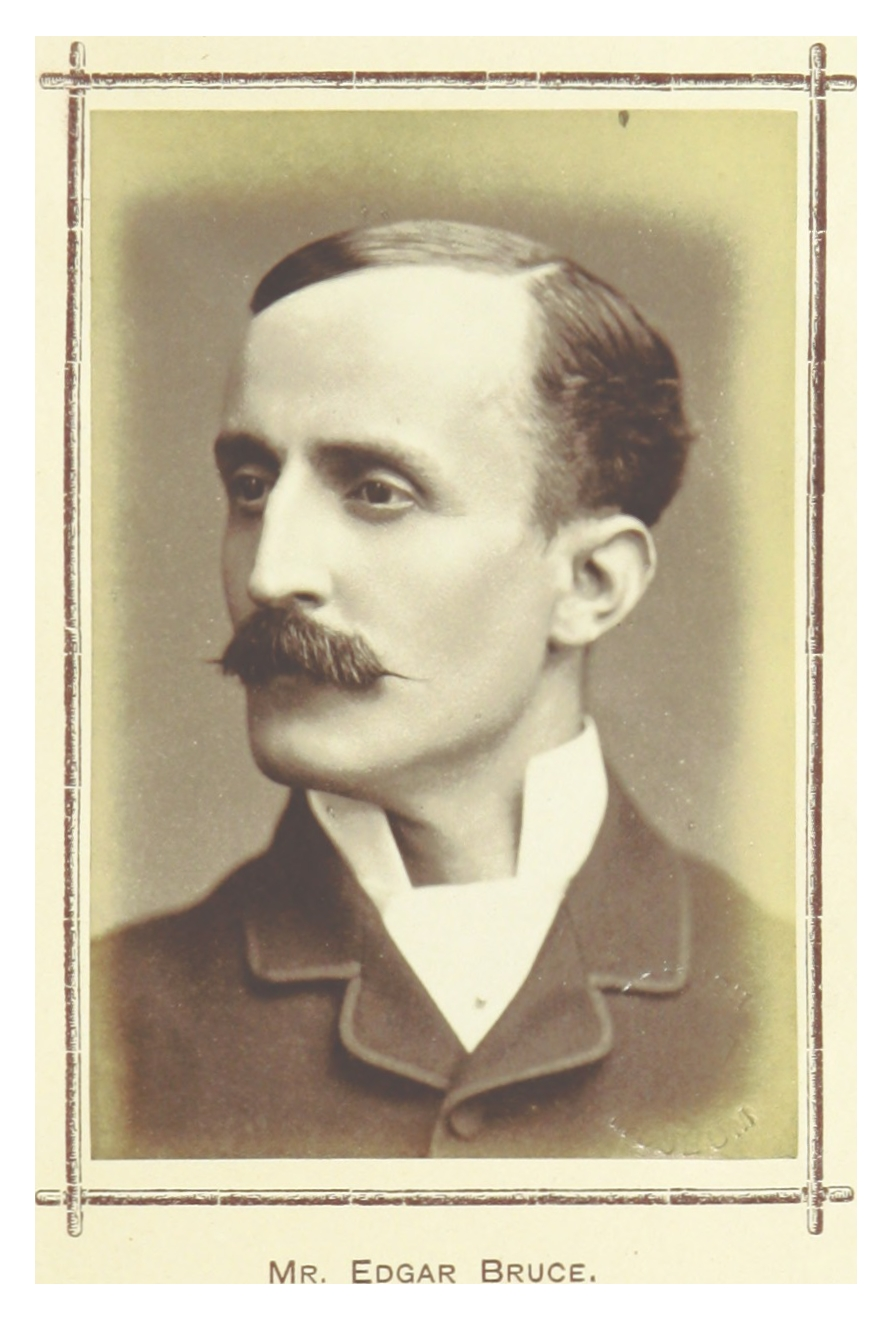

Edgar Bruce (c. 1845–1901) was an English actor-manager, appearing in comedies and later producing plays. He built the Prince of Wales Theatre in 1884.

== Life ==
Bruce's first stage appearance was in 1868 at the Prince of Wales's Theatre in Liverpool. His London debut was in August 1869 at the Royal Strand Theatre, in a burlesque The Pilgrim of Love. In August 1871 he became a member of the Wyndham Comedy Company, which performed in the US and Canada. In the company Bruce played leading parts in plays by T. W. Robertson: as D'Alroy and Hawtree in Caste, Mcalister and Chalcot in Ours, and Lord Beaujoy in School.

In 1873 in London he joined the company of the Court Theatre, where he appeared in plays including About Town, Marriage Lines and Wedding March.

=== As theatre manager ===
In June 1875 he opened the Haymarket Theatre under his management, for a period of six weeks. In February 1876 he produced at the Globe Theatre the play Jo, based on Charles Dickens's Bleak House, with Jennie Lee in the title role. In the following year at the same theatre he produced Cora, with Mrs Hermann Vezin in the title role.

In 1878 at the Criterion Theatre he appeared as Greythorne in The Pink Dominos by James Albery. He then toured with George Honey in W. S. Gilbert's play Engaged. In April 1879 the Royalty Theatre, under his management, produced Crutch and Toothpick, adapted by George R. Sims from a French farce; it ran for 240 nights.

=== Prince's Theatre ===
From 1880 Bruce managed the Prince of Wales's Theatre, where in the following year he produced The Colonel by F. C. Burnand, which ran for 550 nights. The theatre building was condemned in 1882, and with the profits from The Colonel he built the Prince's Theatre. It opened in January 1884 with W. S. Gilbert's The Palace of Truth.

The theatre was renamed the Prince of Wales Theatre in 1886, and in December of that year he staged there the original production of the musical Alice in Wonderland.

=== Family ===
Sybil Etonia Bruce, daughter of Bruce and his wife Lucy, was born in 1892; she became, as Toni Edgar-Bruce, a stage and screen actress.

Bruce died in 1901.
