= Charles Lane (actor, born 1869) =

American actor

Charles W. Lane
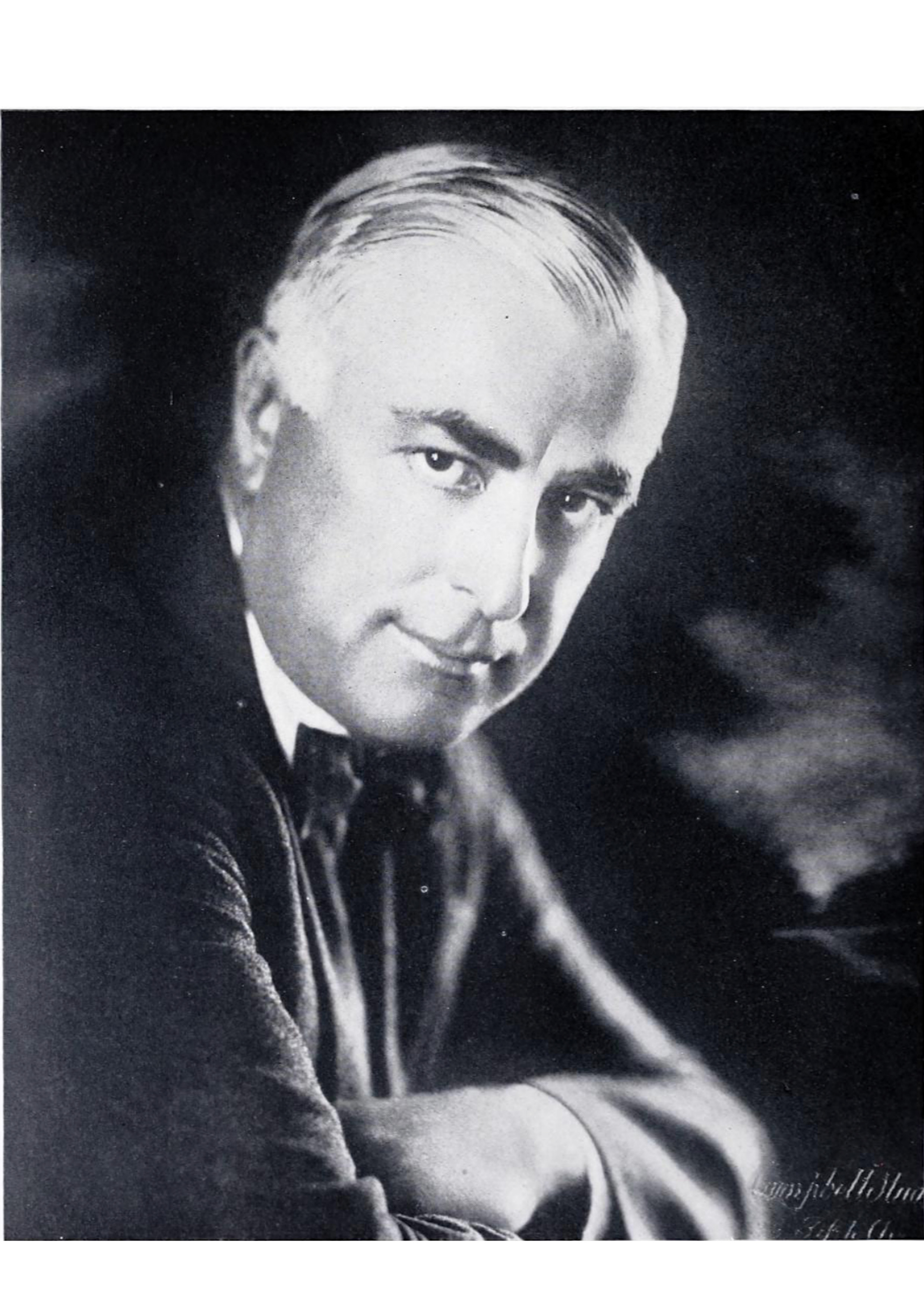
- ca. 1920
- Born: January 25, 1869; Madison, Illinois
- Died: October 17, 1945 (aged 76); Van Nuys, California
- Occupation: Actor

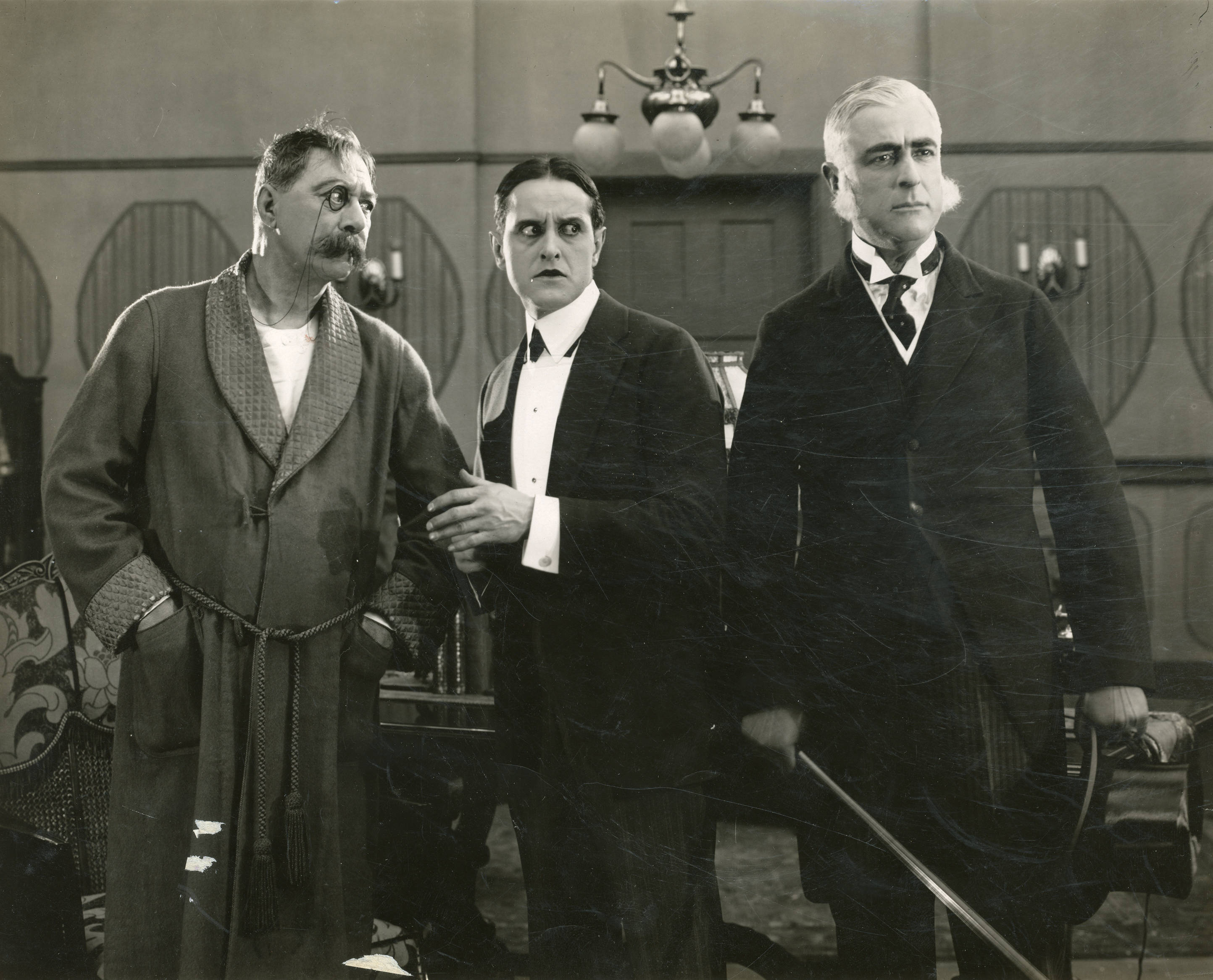
a scene from Ruggles of Red Gap(1918) with l to r: Lawrence D'Orsay, Taylor Holmes and Charles Lane

Charles Willis Lane (January 25, 1869 – October 17, 1945) was an American stage and film actor, active from 1914 to 1929. Like many film performers born before 1900 Lane had extensive prior Broadway stage or regional theatrical experience stretching back to his youth in the 1890s. One of his significant stage roles was the abusive husband Robert Harding in George Broadhurst's The Law of the Land which he portrayed at the 48th Street Theatre in 1914-1915.

Lane was born in Madison, Illinois, and can be seen in silent films usually as a silver-haired other man or confidant. Two of his best-known roles are Dr. Lanyon in Dr. Jekyll and Mr. Hyde (1920) and Dr. Angus McPhail in Sadie Thompson (1928).

== Partial filmography ==
- The Man from Mexico (1914) (* unconfirmed and/or uncredited)
- Mrs. Black Is Back (1914, also in 1904 Broadway play) - Prof. Newton Black
- Ruggles of Red Gap (1918) - Earl of Brinstead
- Wanted: A Husband (1919) - Tom Harmon
- Dr. Jekyll and Mr. Hyde (1920) - Dr. Richard Lanyon
- Away Goes Prudence (1920) - Mr. Thorne
- Guilty of Love (1920) - Goddard Townsend
- The Branded Woman (1920) - Herbert Averill
- The Restless Sex (1920) - John Cleland
- Without Limit (1921) - Clement Palter
- If Women Only Knew (1921) - Dr. John Strong
- Love's Penalty (1921) - Rev. John Kirchway
- Fascination (1922) - Eduardo de Lisa (her father)
- Broadway Rose (1922) - Peter Thompson
- How Women Love (1922) - Ogden Ward
- The Tents of Allah (1923) - Commander Millgrate
- The White Sister (1923) - Prince Chiaromonte
- Second Youth (1924) - Weeks Twombly
- Romola (1924) - Baldassar Calvo
- I Want My Man (1925) - French Doctor
- The Marriage Whirl (1925) - Reuben Hale
- The Dark Angel (1925) - Sir Hubert Vane
- Stella Dallas (1925) - Stephen Dallas, Sr. (uncredited)
- Pearl of Love (1925) - Captain Pinnel
- The Outsider (1926) - Sir Jasper Sturdee
- The Blind Goddess (1926) - Judge
- Padlocked (1926) - Monte Hermann
- The Mystery Club (1926) - John Cranahan
- Marriage License? (1926) - Sir John
- The Winning of Barbara Worth (1926) - Jefferson Worth
- The Music Master (1927) - Richard Stanton
- The Whirlwind of Youth (1927) - Jim Hawthorne
- Married Alive (1927) - Mr. Fountain
- Service for Ladies (1927) - Robert Foster, her father
- Barbed Wire (1927) - Col. Duval
- Sadie Thompson (1928) - Dr. Angus McPhail
- The Canary Murder Case (1929) - Charles Spottswoode
- Saturday's Children (1929) - Mr. Henry Halevy
- Broadway Scandals (1929) - Radio Announcer (final film role)
