= The Marriage Whirl =

1925 film

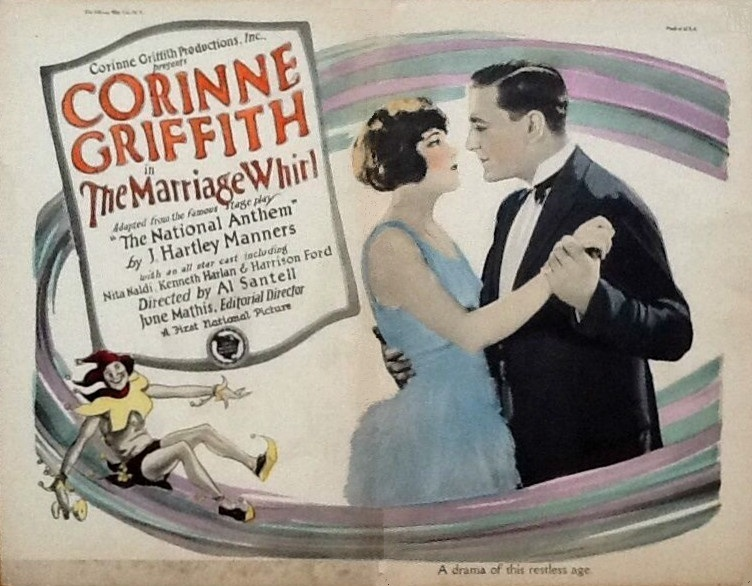
- Lobby card
- Directed by: Alfred Santell
- Screenplay by: Bradley King
- Based on: The National Anthem by J. Hartley Manners
- Starring: Corinne Griffith; Kenneth Harlan; Harrison Ford; E. J. Ratcliffe; Charles Willis Lane; Edgar Norton; Nita Naldi
- Cinematography: Ted McCord
- Edited by: Cyril Gardner
- Production company: Corinne Griffith Productions
- Distributed by: First National Pictures
- Release date: July 19, 1925
- Running time: 80 minutes
- Country: United States
- Language: Silent (English intertitles)

The Marriage Whirl is a 1925 American silent drama film directed by Alfred Santell and written by Bradley King. It is based on the 1922 play The National Anthem by J. Hartley Manners. The film stars Corinne Griffith, Kenneth Harlan, Harrison Ford, E. J. Ratcliffe, Charles Willis Lane, Edgar Norton, and Nita Naldi. The film was released on July 19, 1925, by First National Pictures.

== Plot ==
As described in a film magazine review, Marian Hale marries Arthur Carleton, the "life of many parties," to reform him. He behaves until his friends surprise him at his home one night a little party where both he and his bride are affected with liquor. A good friend of hers is Tom Carrol. Marion and Arthur go to a monotonous little French town where they stay for a few weeks. He then persuades her to move to Paris, and there they are thrown among a continuous round of drinking parties. Arthur has an open affair with the dancer Toinette, who persuades him to go to the apartment. Marion's presence is unknown until she breaks into their love scene and orders them away. She then reaches for a headache tablet but swallows poison by mistake. Knowing that he is in town, she calls Tom frantically. While waiting for him to come, she is so annoyed by a jazz orchestra that she walks into the ballroom to ask to have it stopped when she falls in a faint. The doctor treats her while word comes that her husband and the dancer have had an accident in which her husband has died. When Tom arrives, he proposes and she accepts.

== Cast ==
- Corinne Griffith as Marian Hale
- Kenneth Harlan as Arthur Carleton
- Harrison Ford as Tom Carrol
- E. J. Ratcliffe as John J. Carleton
- Charles Willis Lane as Reuben Hale
- Edgar Norton as Dick Mayne
- Nita Naldi as Toinette
- Rosalind Byrne as Party Guest (uncredited)

== Preservation ==
With no prints of The Marriage Whirl located in any film archives, it is a lost film.
