= George Reginald Bacchus =

George Reginald Bacchus (1874–1945) was an English writer. He wrote a number of erotic books published by the Erotika Biblion Society.

== Life ==
He was the son of George Henry Bacchus of the New South Wales Artillery and his wife Mary Constance Annie Woolley, daughter of John Woolley. He was educated at Clifton College, and matriculated at Exeter College, Oxford in 1892.

Bacchus married Isa Bowman, a former child-actress and friend of Lewis Carroll, in 1899. In 1899–1900 he published a fictionalised version of her life on the stage in Society, a magazine he was editing. Leonard Smithers commissioned a pornographic version which was published as The Confessions of Nemesis Hunt (issued in three volumes 1902, 1903, 1906), the first two volumes printed by Duringe of Paris and the last in London.
