= Mrs. Black Is Back =

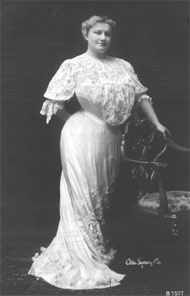
- May Irwin in the 1904 Broadway production of Mrs. Black is Back
- Directed by: Thomas N. Heffron
- Screenplay by: George V. Hobart; Eve Unsell
- Produced by: Daniel Frohman
- Starring: May Irwin; Charles Lane; Clara Blandick; Wellington A. Playter; Elmer Booth; James Hester
- Production company: Famous Players Film Company
- Distributed by: Paramount Pictures
- Release date: November 30, 1914
- Country: United States
- Language: English

Mrs. Black Is Back is a 1914 American silent comedy film directed by Thomas N. Heffron and written by George V. Hobart and Eve Unsell. The film stars May Irwin, Charles Lane, Clara Blandick, Wellington A. Playter, Elmer Booth and James Hester. The film was released on November 30, 1914, by Paramount Pictures.

== Cast ==
- May Irwin as Mrs. Black
- Charles Lane as Professor Newton Black
- Clara Blandick as Emily Mason
- Wellington A. Playter as Tom Larkey
- Elmer Booth as Jack Dangerfield
- James Hester as Major Thorne
- Cyril Chadwick as Bramley Bush
- Marie Pavis as Priscilla Black
- Howard Missimer as Valet
