= Henry Savile Clarke =

English dramatist, journalist and critic

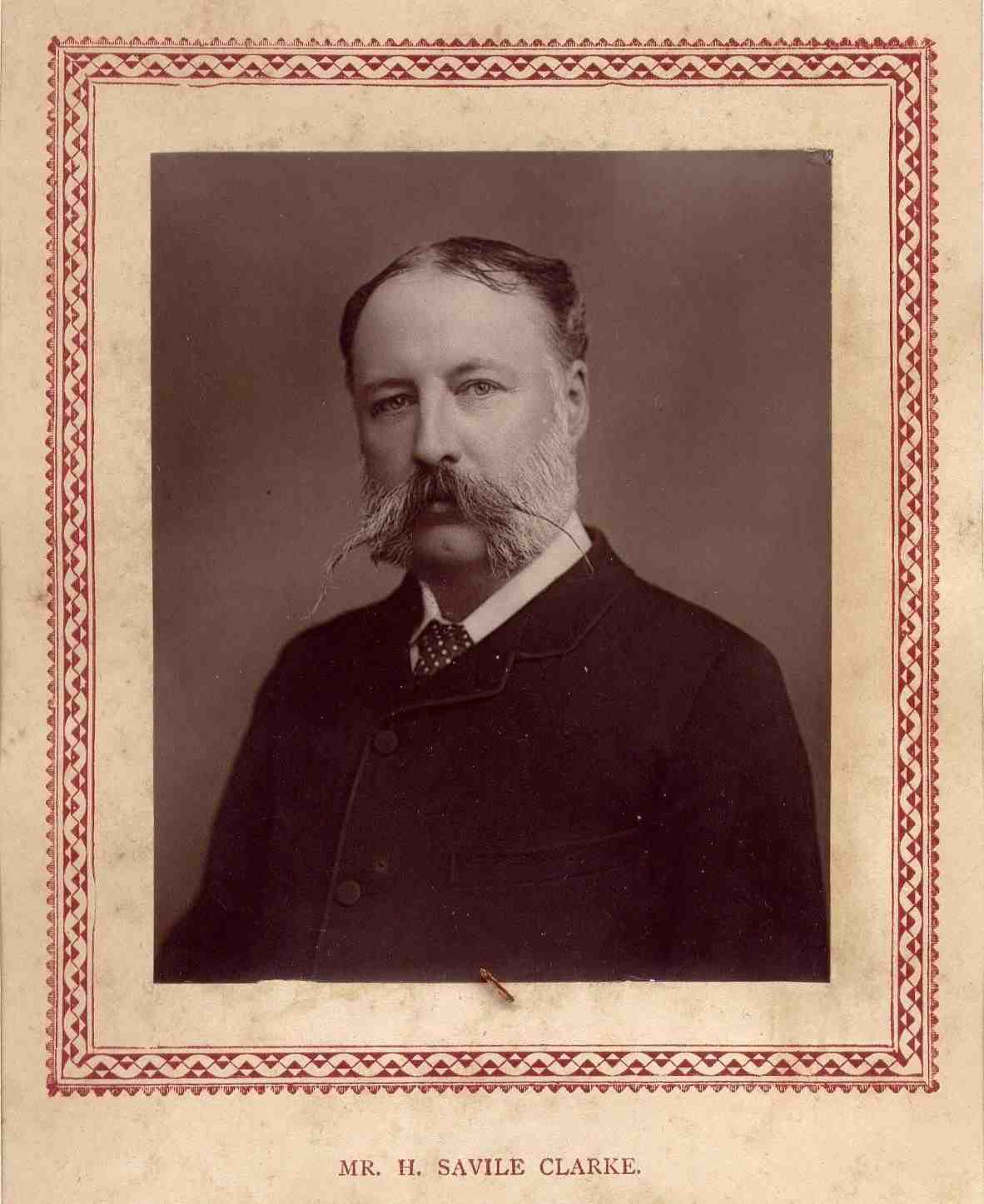
Henry Savile Clarke in 1889

Henry Savile Clarke (14 February 1841 – 5 October 1893) was an English dramatist, journalist and critic. He produced and wrote the lyrics and book for the first professional dramatisation of Alice's Adventures in Wonderland and Through the Looking-Glass (1886) which remained a popular children's Christmas entertainment for half a century.

== Early life and family ==
Clarke was the oldest of six children born to the Rev. Henry Clarke, Vicar of Guisborough (1814–1861), and his wife Catherine Frances née Dawson (1818–1852). Clarke went to Edinburgh to study medicine, but there became increasingly interested in journalism. He became one of the circle of enthusiastic young men around the writer James Hannay and consequently left medicine for literature. On 27 April 1865 Clarke married the artist Helen Weatherill (1840–1898) in Guisborough. In 1866 the couple moved to London, where they had three daughters: the writer Clara Savile Clarke (1869–1898), Margaret Helen "Maggie" Clarke (1870–1894) and Catherine Dawson "Kitty" Clarke (1872–1901).

== Career ==
Clarke took up writing in London and within a year or two was listed in advertising for Cassell's Magazine, where he was described as one of its "well-known" contributors. He gradually became known as a journalist on various subjects, while writing light literature and the books and lyrics for musicals. This career was to last for about 25 years. In 1878 he wrote the words for Songs of Israel to the music of Abraham Saqui (c. 1824–1893), the first choirmaster of the Princes Road Synagogue in Liverpool. Other works by Clarke include lyrics for the operetta An Adamless Eden! (1882) and for Lila Clay and her all-female troupe. He also wrote the English adaptation of Gillette de Narbonne, which opened at London's Royalty Theatre on 19 November 1883, with additional music by Walter Slaughter and Hamilton Clarke. The production was not a success and closed within a month.

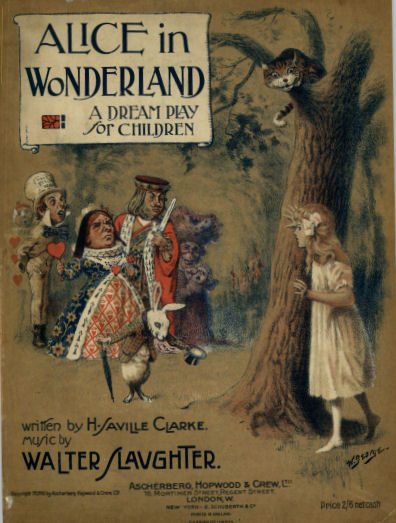
Score for Alice in Wonderland (1906)

In August 1886 Clarke wrote to Lewis Carroll for permission to adapt Alice's Adventures in Wonderland (1865) and Through the Looking-Glass (1871) into a Christmas musical stage show. There had been some amateur productions of Alice, and for the first and only time Carroll agreed to his work being performed on the professional stage. Carroll soon accepted Clarke's proposal, but with several stipulations:

"There are one or two wishes on the subject, which I will name for your consideration: but the only essential consideration is that I should have your written guarantee that, neither in the libretto nor in any of the stage business, should any coarseness, or anything suggestive of coarseness, be admitted. ... This piece ought to be an Operetta (like The Mikado) and not a Pantomime."

Clarke wrote the book and lyrics for the successful musical Alice in Wonderland with music by Slaughter and additional lyrics by Aubrey Hopwood. It opened as "A musical dream play in two acts" on 23 December 1886 at the Prince of Wales Theatre, London, where it gained popularity, with Phoebe Carlo in the title role. Carroll was fully involved, offering advice on everything from adaptation to choosing the cast. The musical had twelve West End revivals between 1888 and 1934. In 1890 Clarke adapted Thackeray's The Rose and the Ring, which was also set to music by Slaughter.

An article in The Theatre in 1889 stated that Clarke wrote "many hundreds of leaders and other articles for London, country, and American papers". He was the London drama critic for The Scotsman and regularly contributed verse in various styles and stories and articles for magazines and periodicals as H. Savile Clarke, but occasionally signed with his initials "H.S.C.". In the 1891 Census, he listed himself as editor, author and newspaper proprietor, but it is not known which newspaper he owned. Clarke wrote original plays and adapted stage works from German and French. He edited the Court Circular from 1872 until his death in 1893. He was a keen amateur photographer.

Clarke's journalism included writing for The Belgravia; Fun, The Latest News (becoming its editor in 1870), Punch, The London Evening Standard, The Globe, The Graphic, The Theatre, St James's Gazette, The World, The Illustrated London News, and The Examiner.

While continuing with journalism, Clarke wrote nothing further for the theatre in 1891–1892 due to illness, although an early 1893 press statement stated that he was writing the libretto for a new opera for the Shaftesbury Theatre.

== Death ==
Clarke died of tuberculosis, aged 52, in October 1893 at Cleveland Lodge, his long-time home in Alexander Street, Westbourne Gardens. He was buried in Kensal Green Cemetery on 9 October 1893. He left an estate valued at £2,132 0s 10d to his widow, Helen Savile Clarke.
