= Cissy Grahame =

Cissy Grahame (1862–1944) was a British stage actress and theatre manager.

Grahame made her first stage appearance, aged 13, at the Theatre Royal, Hull under Wilson Barrett in 1875.

In 1890 she became manageress at Terry's Theatre. There she produced Jerome K. Jerome's play New Lamps for Old, with financial backing from Horatio Bottomley.

By 1892 Grahame was touring with a triple bill company.
