= Henry Leigh Murray =

English actor (1820–1870)

Henry Leigh Murray (19 October 1820 – 17 January 1870) was an English actor.

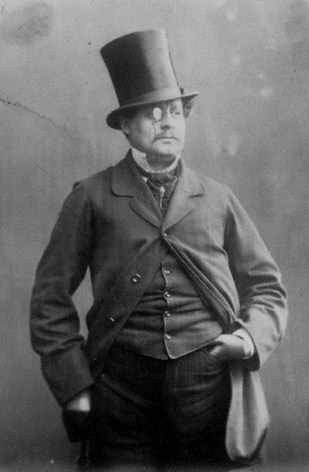
Henry Leigh Murray

== Early life ==
Murray was born in Sloane Street, London, 19 October 1820, with the surname Wilson. While a clerk in a merchant's office he made a start on amateur acting, in a small theatre in Catherine Street, Strand, his first appearance being about 1838 as Buckingham in King Richard III. Other Shakespearean parts followed, and on 2 December 1839, under Hooper, manager of the York circuit, he made his professional debut at Kingston upon Hull, playing Ludovico in Othello. On 17 September 1840, as Leigh (perhaps to avoid confusion with his manager) he appeared at the Adelphi Theatre, Edinburgh, under William Henry Murray, as Lieutenant Morton in The Middy Ashore by William Bayle Bernard. Occasionally visiting other Scottish towns, he remained in Edinburgh, at the Theatre Royal or the Adelphi, till the spring of 1845. Among the characters he played were Dr. Caius, Jan Dousterswyvel in The Lost Ship by William Thompson Townsend, Hotspur, and Mark Antony as his farewell to the Edinburgh stage.

== The London stage ==
Murray's first appearance in London took place at the Princess's Theatre under J. M. Maddox on 19 April 1845, as Sir Thomas Clifford in The Hunchback by Sheridan Knowles, with Lester Wallack in the lead, Charlotte Cushman as Julia and Walter Lacy playing Lord Tinsel. He played Bassanio, Orlando, and Leonardo Gonzaga, and was the original Herman Lindorf in James Kenney's Infatuation, and Malcolm Young in James White's King of the Commons. He was also Icilius to William Charles Macready's Virginius, in the Virgilius of Knowles, and De Mauprat to his Richelieu, in the Richelieu of Bulwer Lytton.

With Macready, Murray went, in the autumn of 1846, to the Surrey Theatre, where he played secondary characters in Shakespeare and Loveless in The Relapse. On the recommendation of Charles Dickens he was chosen at the Lyceum Theatre to play Alfred Heathfield in Albert Richard Smith's adaptation of The Battle of Life. At the Lyceum he remained under the Keeley and the Mathews managements. His Marquis de Volange in the Pride of the Market (James Robinson Planché) won recognition.

In Dublin in 1848 Murray supported Helen Faucit. Leaving the Lyceum for the Olympic Theatre, he became stage-manager under Joachim Hayward Stocqueler, and then under Spicer and Davidson. There he played character parts in pieces then in vogue, such as Time Tries All (John Courtney), and His First Champagne (William Leman Rede). In the theatricals given during 1848 and 1849 at Windsor Castle he played Lorenzo in the Merchant of Venice, Laertes, Octavius in Julius Caesar, and Gustavus in Charles XII (James Robinson Planché). Murray accompanied William Farren, whose stage-manager he became, to the Strand Theatre, and back to the Olympic. He supported Gustavus Vaughan Brooke as Iago, and Wellborn in A New Way to pay Old Debts.

Murray accompanied Benjamin Webster to the Adelphi Theatre, where on 1 April 1853 he played in Mark Lemon's farce Mr. Webster at the Adelphi, and made an impression, 10 October 1853, in Webster's Discarded Son, the first of many adaptations of Un Fils de Famille (Bayard and De Bieville). On 20 March 1854 he was Sir Gervase Rokewode in Two Loves and a Life, by Tom Taylor and Charles Reade, and on 31 May was first Raphael Duchatelet in the Marble Heart, Charles Selby's adaptation of Les Filles de Marbre (Théodore Barrière and Lambert-Thiboust). In September he left the Adelphi, and the next year was at Sadler's Wells Theatre.

On 4 November 1856 Murray reappeared at the Adelphi as Sir Walter Raeburn in the Border Marriage (Un Mariage à l'Arquebuse, by Léon Guillard). On 8 March 1858 he was, at Drury Lane Theatre, the first M. Bernard in Stirling Coyne's Love Knot. As John Mildmay in Still Waters run deep (Tom Taylor) he reappeared at the Lyceum on 7 August 1859, and played subsequently M. Tourbillon in To Parents and Guardians (Tom Taylor), and Claude Melnotte (in The Lady of Lyons by Bulwer Lytton). On 9 November he enacted at St James's Theatre the original Harrington in James Kenney's London Pride, or Living for Appearances.

== Later life ==
A benefit was given for Murray at Drury Lane on 27 June 1865, when he was in failing health. Representations were given by various London actors, Murray and his wife delivering a duologue written by Shirley Brooks.

Murray died 17 January 1870 and was buried in Brompton cemetery. He was a member of the Garrick Club.

== Family ==
Murray's mother Marian was a member of the Garstin family, later better known as the Belmore family acting dynasty; her brother George was the grandfather of Lionel Belmore and his sister Daisy Belmore.

Murray married in 1841 Elizabeth Lee, a member of the Edinburgh company, and the second daughter of Henry Lee; she later appeared as Mrs. Elizabeth Leigh Murray, and died in 1892.

Murray's younger brother, Gaston Murray (1826–1889), real name Garstin Parker Wilson, first appeared in London at the Lyceum on 2 March 1855 as Tom Saville in Used Up, played in various theatres, and tried some of his brother's parts. He died 8 August 1889. His wife, Mary Frances, known as Mrs. Gaston Murray, daughter of Henry Hughes, of the Adelphi Theatre, also acted. On 24 May 1889, at the opening of the Garrick Theatre, she was the original Mrs. Stonehay in Arthur Pinero's The Profligate. She died on 15 January 1891.

== Notes ==
Attribution

This article incorporates text from a publication now in the public domain: Lee, Sidney, ed. (1894). "Murray, Henry Leigh". Dictionary of National Biography. Vol. 39. London: Smith, Elder & Co.
