= Macbeth (1913 film) =

1913 film by Arthur Bourchier

- Directed by: Arthur Bourchier
- Based on: play Macbeth by William Shakespeare
- Produced by: Ludwig Landmann
- Starring: Arthur Bourchier; Violet Vanbrugh
- Production company: Film-Industrie Gesellschaft
- Release date: 17 November 1913 (UK)
- Running time: 5 reels
- Country: Germany
- Language: Silent

Macbeth is a German 1913 silent film version of the William Shakespeare play Macbeth, and the fifth film adaptation of that work. Arthur Bourchier plays Macbeth, and Violet Vanbrugh Lady Macbeth. It was released on 17 November 1913 in the UK. It was distributed in the US as a five-reel film, and the announced British lengths were 4200, 4500 and 4700 feet.

It was thought to be a lost film, But the International Museum of Photography and Film at the George Eastman Museum has a print.

Robert Hamilton found that the film did no respect the spirit of the tragedy at all and added, "To make the unpleasant impression complete, there are five reels of poor photography."
