= Dear Brutus =

1917 fantasy play by J. M. Barrie

- Faith Celli as Margaret, the dream child
- Written by: J. M. Barrie
- Original language: English
- Genre: Fantasy

Premiere
- Date premiered: 17 October 1917
- Place premiered: Wyndham's Theatre, London

Dear Brutus is a 1917 fantasy play by J. M. Barrie, depicting alternative realities for its characters and their eventual return to real life. The title is a reference to a line from Shakespeare's Julius Caesar: "The fault, dear Brutus, is not in our stars but in ourselves" (which is quoted in full by Mr. Purdie near the end).

== First production ==
The play ran for 363 performances at the Wyndham's Theatre in the West End between 17 October 1917 and 24 August 1918.

=== Original cast ===
- Mr Dearth – Gerald du Maurier
- Mr Purdie – Sam Sothern
- Mr Coade – Norman Forbes
- Matey – Will West
- Lob – Arthur Hatherton
- Mrs Dearth – Hilda Moore
- Mrs Purdie – Jessie Bateman
- Mrs Coade – Maude Millett
- Joanna Trout – Doris Lytton
- Lady Caroline Laney – Lydia Bilbrook
- Margaret – Faith Celli

Source: The Times

The play was revived in 1922 at the same venue for another 257 performance run, with du Maurier again in the cast along with Mabel Terry-Lewis, Alfred Drayton, Ronald Squire and Joyce Carey.

== Plot ==
The theme of the play is whether it would benefit people if they could have their lives over again and make different choices. The characters consist of dissatisfied couples, who all feel that they have taken the wrong turning in life. They are brought together to the house of an ancient individual bearing the Shakespearean name of Lob, who is described as "all that is left of Merry England".

Outside his house on Midsummer Night an enchanted wood springs up, in which, in Act 2, the visitors undergo a metamorphosis. A light-fingered butler has taken another turning and become a rich but fraudulent financier; the high-and-mighty aristocrat who belittles him in the first act is now in love with him. A philanderer now married to his mistress discovers his affinity with his former wife. A heavy-drinking painter, despised by his wife and lamenting his lack of children, finds himself happy with a devoted daughter; his wife is alone, and starving, abandoned by the aristocrat she had wished in Act 1 that she had married.

In Act 3 the characters return to reality, having benefited to varying degrees from their experiences in the wood in Act 2. The butler resigns himself to domestic service rather than high finance; the philanderer is mortified but predicts he will be unable to reform; an elderly man who had longed for a second youth proposes again to his faithful spouse; the artist and his wife are reconciled, and the dream child of Act 2 has become almost real to both of them and lives on in their hearts.

== Critical reception ==
The play was favourably reviewed. One critic said, "Dear Brutus fascinated me … His humour is at its best and his one note of pathos true." Another wrote, "Barrie-ish, yes. But what an elusive quality this is – sentimental, wistful, pathetic, cheerful, familiar, fantastic!" Several reviewers commented that despite the quotation from Julius Caesar in Barrie's title, the Shakespeare play that repeatedly came to mind was A Midsummer Night's Dream. The theatrical cartoonist of the Illustrated Sporting and Dramatic News drew the aristocrat and the butler in Act 2 as Titania and Bottom, and the philanderer, his wife and mistress as Lysander, Helena and Hermia.

Barrie's characters seen as variants of Shakespeare's from A Midsummer Night's Dream

== Bibliography ==
- White, Donna R.; Tarr, Anita C. (2006), J. M. Barrie's Peter Pan In and Out of Time: A Children's Classic at 100, Scarecrow Press
- Wearing, J. P. (2013), The London Stage 1910–1919: A Calendar of Productions, Performers, and Personnel, Rowman & Littlefield
- Wearing, J. P. (2014), The London Stage 1920–1929: A Calendar of Productions, Performers, and Personnel, Rowman & Littlefield
