= Kenneth Barnes (director) =

Sir Kenneth Barnes
- Barnes in 1943

Principal of the Academy (from 1920 Royal Academy) of Dramatic Art
- In office 1909–1955

Personal details
- Born: Kenneth Ralph Barnes; 11 September 1878; Heavitree, Devon
- Died: 16 October 1957 (aged 79); Kingston Gorse, Sussex

Sir Kenneth Ralph Barnes (11 September 1878 – 16 October 1957) was principal of the Academy of Dramatic Art – later the Royal Academy of Dramatic Art (RADA) – in London, from 1909 to 1955.

Barnes was a son of a West Country vicar; his siblings included the actresses Violet Vanbrugh and Irene Vanbrugh. During his education at Westminster School and Christ Church, Oxford, he became interested in theatre. Over the first decade of the 20th century, he became first a civil servant and then a freelance writer and critic before being appointed to run the academy. His long tenure there was interrupted only by his service in the First World War.

Under Barnes's leadership the academy expanded and flourished, receiving a royal charter in 1920, opening its own theatre in 1921 and, from 1923, awarding degrees under the aegis of the University of London. He was also instrumental in obtaining recognition of acting as a fine art, protecting theatre arts in Britain from taxation. He was knighted in 1938.

== Life and career ==
=== Early years ===
Barnes was born at Heavitree, near Exeter, the youngest of six children of the Reverend Reginald Henry Barnes, Prebendary of Exeter Cathedral and Vicar of Heavitree, and his wife, Frances Mary Emily, née Nation. Two of his sisters became actresses using the stage names Violet Vanbrugh and Irene Vanbrugh. He was educated at Westminster School and Christ Church, Oxford, where he was a member of the Oxford University Dramatic Society and, according to his biographer Donald Roy, "did just enough work to gain an indifferent pass degree in 1899".

After leaving Oxford, Barnes became a civil servant, with an undemanding post in the Land Registry, enabling him to live in London and enjoy membership of the Garrick Club, cricket at Lord's, and West End theatre. After a few years he resigned from the civil service to become a freelance writer and journalist. He contributed theatre reviews to The Daily Mirror, The Evening Standard and The Times, and drafted and translated plays.

=== Academy of Dramatic Art ===
Barnes's sisters Violet and Irene were married to influential actor-managers – respectively Arthur Bourchier and Dion Boucicault, Jr. – who were instrumental in securing for Barnes the post of secretary and administrator of what was then called "Mr Tree's Academy of Dramatic Art". The academy, later (from 1920) the Royal Academy of Dramatic Art, was founded by the actor-manager Herbert Beerbohm Tree in 1904. It was intended to be a British equivalent of the Paris Conservatoire, providing what Tree described as the "elementary training which is recognised as useful in every other art and in every other profession". The first secretary of the academy was George Bancroft, son of Squire Bancroft and Marie Wilton; Barnes succeeded him in 1909.

Barnes was appointed on a year's probation at an annual salary of £250 (equivalent to £32,917 in 2023). When he took over the academy there were only 40 pupils, and its future looked uncertain. He revived its fortunes by instituting rigorous procedures for auditioning applicants, maximising the income from fees, and establishing student scholarships related to performance. He acquired for the academy the house and garden adjacent to its Gower Street premises to make room for expansion and the construction of a theatre for public performances.

Students

Among the earliest students at the academy under Barnes's leadership were

- Miles Malleson
- Kynaston Reeves

In the inter-war years his students included

- John Gielgud
- Kay Hammond
- Cedric Hardwicke
- Celia Johnson
- Charles Laughton
- Vivien Leigh
- Basil Radford
- Flora Robson

Students from later in Barnes's tenure included

- Alan Bates
- Albert Finney
- Sheila Hancock
- Glenda Jackson
- Alec McCowen
- Joe Orton
- Peter O'Toole
- Siân Phillips
- Diana Rigg
- Dorothy Tutin

Barnes's work at the academy was interrupted by the First World War, during which he served as an army officer in India and the Middle East. He was mentioned in dispatches for his work organising morale-boosting entertainments for the soldiers.

=== Interwar years: 1919 to 1939 ===
When Barnes returned to England in December 1919 and resumed his post at the academy he found it in financial difficulties and short of students. He raised funds and worked to complete the building of the academy's theatre which had been stopped by the war. It was opened by the Prince of Wales in May 1921. A royal charter had been awarded in 1920 and the institution was renamed the Royal Academy of Dramatic Art. In 1923 Barnes collaborated with the Central School of Speech and Drama, founded two years after the academy, in launching a university diploma in dramatic art under the aegis of the University of London.

After continual lobbying by Barnes the British government awarded the academy an annual grant from 1924 and recognised it as a charity in 1926, thus exempting it from income tax. In 1925 Barnes married Daphne, daughter of Sir Richard James Graham of Netherby, Cumberland. She was a former student of his, and acted under the stage name of Mary Sheridan. They had one son.

In 1930, after prolonged legal action, Barnes won from the courts a decision that acting was henceforth to be classed as a fine art on a par with literature, painting, sculpture, architecture, and music. This exempted the academy from local taxes. Barnes was knighted in 1938.

=== War and postwar: 1940 to 1957 ===
The academy's theatre was destroyed by German bombing during the Second World War. Barnes and his colleagues made plans for its replacement with a larger and better equipped theatre. In this, as in other aspects of his work, he was greatly helped by the advice and practical assistance of his sisters, and by the continued interest in his work taken by Queen Elizabeth the Queen Mother, who in 1952 laid the foundation stone of the new theatre. Barnes raised £78,000, and the Vanbrugh Theatre, named after his sisters, was opened in 1954.

Barnes retired in 1955. The Tatler commented, "It is impossible to compute the debt which the theatre in this country owes to Sir Kenneth in his record-breaking forty-six years in Gower Street with an interlude for Army service overseas throughout World War One and for a generation the West End stage has been brilliant with the stars he has kindled". He had built up the roll of students from 40 in 1909 to well over 200. He was succeeded as principal by the stage director John Fernald.

On 16 October 1957 Barnes died at his home in Kingston Gorse, Sussex, aged 79. The Times said of him:

It is doubtful whether in the whole history of the theatre any one man did more to secure sound training for the young actor and actress, and he lived long enough to see a dream of Sir Herbert Tree's brought to full fruition and to receive the plaudits of everybody who loves the theatre when the academy celebrated its golden jubilee in the summer of 1954.

== Sources ==
- Hartnoll, Phyllis (1967). "Barnes, Kenneth". The Oxford Companion to the Theatre (third ed.). London and New York: Oxford University Press. ISBN 0-19-211531-6.
- Herbert, Ian, ed. (1977). Who's Who in the Theatre (sixteenth ed.). London and Detroit: Pitman Publishing and Gale Research. ISBN 978-0-273-00163-8.
- Parker, John, ed. (1939). Who's Who in the Theatre (ninth ed.). London: Sir Isaac Pitman and Sons. OCLC 473894893.
