= Helen Rous =

Irish actress (1863–1934)

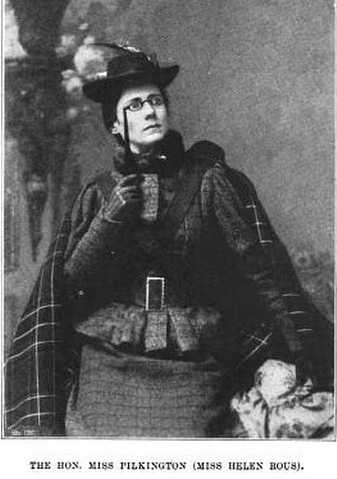
- Helen Rous, from an 1896 publication
- Born: 1863; Carlow
- Died: 23 March 1934 (aged 70–71)
- Occupation: Actress
- Relatives: Kathleen Trousdell Shaw (sister)

Helen Rous (1863– 23 March 1934) was an Irish actor who played many times on the London stage. Her parts included supporting roles in works by Oscar Wilde and George Bernard Shaw.

== Early life ==
The daughter of Alfred Shaw, she was born in Carlow and was educated at home and at Alexandra College. Kathleen Trousdell Shaw was her younger sister.

== Stage career ==
Rous was trained for the stage by Sarah Thorne of the Theatre Royal, Brighton. She made her debut in 1891, with the part of Pauline in The Black Doctor, an Ira Aldridge adaptation from a French original.

After two years in South Africa in a repertory company, Rous on returning to the United Kingdom toured with Otho Stuart and Alfred B. Tapping. In 1896 she played in London at the Royalty Theatre, with Arthur Bourchier and Violet Vanbrugh in The Queen's Proctor by Herman Charles Merivale.

Rous spent some years in touring England and the USA, with London roles. Her 1897 Mrs O'Gallagher in The Strange Adventures of Miss Brown, a "farcical comedy" by Robert Buchanan and Charles Marlowe at the Elephant and Castle Theatre, was reviewed in The Era as "a brisk, bright, and humorous performance". Parts around 1900 included Mrs Candour in a Haymarket Theatre tour of School for Scandal, and Mrs Crossley Beck in A Wife's Peril, an adaptation of Victorien Sardou's Nos Intimes. In 1901 she played in Lion Hunters with Harry Brodribb Irving and Nina Boucicault, at Terry's Theatre; it was a translation of Édouard Pailleron's satire Le Monde où l'on s'ennuie. There followed more London work, and in 1905–6 she was in a tour with John Hare that took her to the Gaiety Theatre, Dublin.

In 1908 Rous was with Granville Barker in a touring production of Shaw's Man and Superman, playing Mrs. Whitfield. In 1909 she played Lady Bracknell in George Alexander's revival of The Importance of Being Earnest, well-reviewed as "unimpeachable" with "well-bred severity". The Edwardian role of Lady Bracknell was well-dressed, and Rous was considered "elegant and gracious" in the part. That year she was in Christabel Marshall's suffragist play How The Vote Was Won, as Miss Lizzie Wilkins.

By 1911 Rous was established in grande dame parts: she had appeared "in these particular parts for several years under John Hare and Charles Frohman, and most of the leading London managements." In a successful 1912 curtain raiser The Dusty Path by Wilfred Coleby, for Charles Maude at the Playhouse Theatre, she played Mrs. Posthurst, "whose appearance and manner suggested a well-known member of the Feminist Movement."

In 1917 Rous played Dame Ursula in The Aristocrat by Louis N. Parker, once more with George Alexander in what was his farewell to the theatre. The run was affected by air raids.

== Death ==
Helen Rous died on 23 March 1934, remembered as a "well-known actress".
