= Ion Swinley =

English actor (1891–1937)

With Irene Vanbrugh in The Truth About Blayds, 1921

Ion Swinley (27 October 1891 – 16 September 1937), born Eric Ion Swindley was an English actor, known for his appearances in classics and modern dramas and comedies.

== Life and career ==
Swinley was born in the London suburb of Barnes on 27 October 1891. He was educated at St Paul's School and the Royal Academy of Dramatic Art, where he won a gold medal. He made his first professional appearance at the age of 19, as Demetrius in Sir Herbert Tree's revival of A Midsummer Night's Dream at His Majesty's Theatre. Early in 1913, he appeared at the Stratford-on-Avon Memorial Theatre. In 1915, he joined the Birmingham Repertory Theatre company for a season.

After the First World War, he resumed his theatrical career in Reparation at the Lyric Theatre, Hammersmith, followed by parts as diverse as the Cardinal in The Duchess of Malfi and Laurence in Paddy, the Next Best Thing. In 1923–24, he was the leading man at the Old Vic, and in subsequent years he was seen in The Wild Duck, The Way of the World and many other plays. In 1921–22, he was in A. A. Milne's The Truth About Blayds with Irene Vanbrugh at the Globe Theatre. In 1929 and 1930, he gave two repertory seasons of modern plays in Cardiff. At the Regent's Park Open Air Theatre in 1933 and 1934, he was again seen in Shakespeare, and in 1935, he rejoined the Old Vic company.

The British Film Institute records seven films in which Swinley appeared between 1914 and 1936. In the first, a version of Trilby, starring Tree as Svengali, he played Little Billee.

Swinley died suddenly at his home in Kensington on 16 September 1937, during the run of The Comedy of Errors at the Open Air Theatre, in which he was playing the Duke.

== References and sources ==
=== Sources ===
- Parker, John, ed. (1922). Who's Who in the Theatre (fourth ed.). London: Sir Isaac Pitman and Sons. OCLC 473894893.
- Wearing, J. P. (2014). The London Stage 1920–1929: A Calendar of Productions, Performers, and Personnel. Lanham, Maryland: Rowman & Littlefield. ISBN 978-0-8108-9302-3.
