= Sydney Valentine =

English actor (1865–1919)

"The Fairy's Dilemma at the Garrick Theatre", in Play Pictorial, March 1904, showing O. B. Clarence, Sydney Valentine as Mr Justice Whortle, Arthur Bourchier, and Violet Vanbrugh

Sydney Valentine Nossiter (1865 – 23 December 1919), known professionally as Sydney Valentine, was an English actor of the Victorian and Edwardian eras. He was President of the Actors' Association and was remembered for negotiating what became the standard contracts for actors in the West End and on tour.

He was born at Kings Norton, Birmingham, in 1865, when his birth was registered with the spelling "Sidney Valentine Nossiter".

== Career ==
Valentine's stage debut was at Dover on 26 December 1882, with the Charles Dickens Repertoire Company. He then took the place of Sydney Paxton in a fit-up company in Wales, and later in 1883 was playing a stock season in Inverness, where he met Paxton, who became a friend. In 1885 they both joined the Compton Comedy Company, and Valentine remained with Compton for two years, then was hit by a severe illness which prevented him from acting for another two years.

In 1897 he appeared in J. M. Barrie's The Little Minister at the Theatre Royal Haymarket, Westminster, playing the part of Rob Dow. He was in George Fleming's The Light That Failed in the West End from February to April 1903, but was not available for the later Broadway production. The following September he starred as Richard Sterling in the United Kingdom premiere of Clyde Fitch's The Climbers at the Comedy Theatre. In 1904 he played Justice Whortle in W. S. Gilbert's The Fairy's Dilemma at the Garrick Theatre. In 1908 he appeared as David Wylie in another Barrie play, What Every Woman Knows, at the Duke of York's Theatre. In 1910 he was one of the stars of John Galsworthy's play Justice at the Duke of York's Theatre, and in September 1911 opened in Henry Arthur Jones's The Ogre. In 1917 he played Green in a Royal Command Performance of Edward Bulwer-Lytton's Money at the Theatre Royal, Drury Lane, before King George V and the Emperor and Empress of Germany.

Valentine went on American tours with Charles Wyndham and Henry Irving, so was known in New York City as well as in London. At the time of his death, he was President of the Actors' Association. A standard contract for touring actors drawn up by the Stage Guild in 1919 was called after him the "Valentine Touring Contract". In 1924 the Labour Magazine applauded this legacy: "But have any of these pillars of the stage left anything half as valuable or as stimulating as has done that far less honoured actor, Sydney Valentine, who literally laid down his life in his struggle to frame a contract between managers and artists which shall not only enable the latter to maintain their self-respect and decent living, but which was also an exceedingly fair agreement from the point of view of employers? Sydney Valentine's legacy to the Actors' Association was the standard contract."

== Private life ==
In 1890, Valentine married Edith Louise Pike, at Lambeth. In 1900 he sued her for divorce, citing Arthur Smythe, a banker, as co-respondent. Smythe was the manager of the Parr's Bank branch in Camden Town and like Valentine was a member of the Green Room Club. On 28 August 1901, at Chelsea, Valentine married secondly Lilian Eileen Clery, the only daughter of the late Surgeon-Major Carlton Clery, of the 18th Hussars. His first wife died at St Pancras in 1912.

With his first wife, Valentine had a son, Guy Valentine Nossiter, born in 1891, who became a jobber's clerk. He used the name of Nossiter for some purposes (including his marriage to Olive Ledward in 1914), but by then was serving in the London Regiment under the name of Guy Valentine. He was killed in action in September 1916, in the Battle of the Somme.

In politics, according to a friend, Valentine was "always a staunch Conservative".

== Death and biography ==
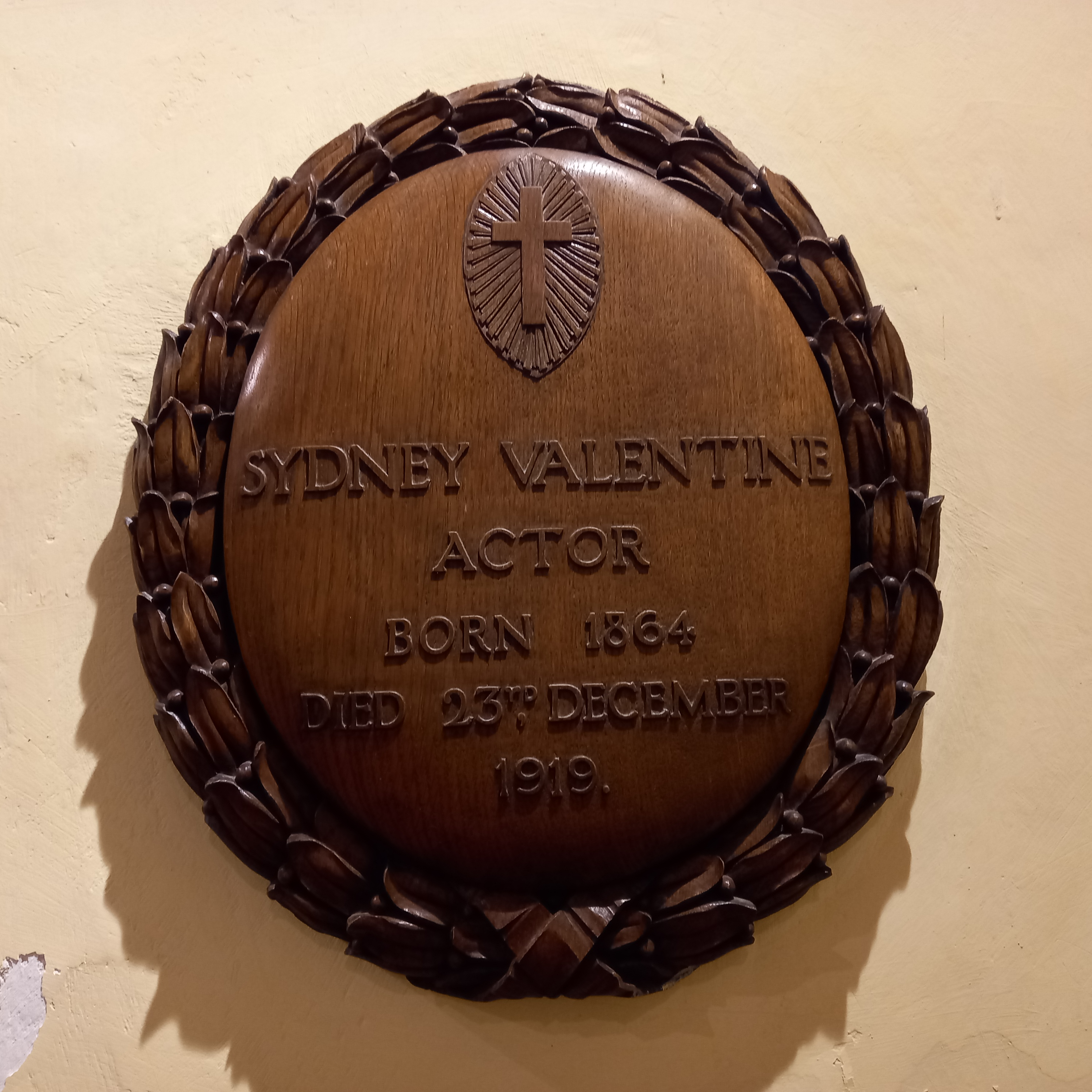
Valentine's memorial plaque in the Church of the Holy Cross, Sarratt

Valentine died at home on 23 December 1919, having never fully recovered from a seizure at a meeting of the Actors' Association on 30 November. He was cremated at the Golders Green Crematorium on 29 December, and a memorial service was held at St Margaret's, Westminster, on 31 December. He left a widow, Lilian Eileen Nossiter. At the time of his death, he lived at Pear Tree Cottage, Sarratt, Hertfordshire, and in Clarence Gate Gardens, Regent's Park, and his estate was valued at £2,948. Later in January the Actors' Association voted to provide a capital sum which would pay Valentine's widow a pension of £3 a week for life, which was described as "the Valentine Standard minimum salary". A memorial was added to the wall of the parish church at Sarratt.

In 1973 Dame Sybil Thorndike recalled that Valentine was "a most powerful actor". In 1996 a biography of him by Edward Rollinson was published, with the title Sydney Valentine 1865–1919: An Actor's Actor. Some letters written by Valentine are in the Princeton University Library.
