= Kathleen Trousdell Shaw =

Anglo-Irish sculptor (1865–1958)

- Born: 1865; London, England
- Died: 1958 (aged 92–93); Buckinghamshire, England
- Education: Metropolitan School of Art, Dublin; École des Beaux Arts
- Known for: Painting, sculpture

Kathleen Trousdell Shaw (1865–1958) was an Anglo-Irish sculptor. She became an honorary member of the Royal Hibernian Academy.

== Early life ==
She was born in Edmonton, England, one of the daughters of Alfred Shaw, an Irish medical practitioner, and his wife Annie Birch; her elder sister, Helen Rous (1863–1934), had a career in acting. Another sister, Mary Helen Shaw, was an artist who spent time in Paris. There was an elder brother Alfred Eland Shaw (1861–1931), a physician known also as an entomologist, who emigrated to Australia.

Kathleen Shaw grew up in Ireland. She was sent, aged 10, to the Metropolitan School of Art, Dublin, where she studied drawing and sculpture, and won prizes. At age 15 she went to Paris and the École des Beaux Arts. She suffered from hearing loss from age 5, and by the time she was 17 was largely deaf. Money was raised in Dublin for her to study with Charles Desvergnes in Rome. There she met Lord Dufferin, the British Ambassador to Italy, and so made social contacts.

== Working artist ==
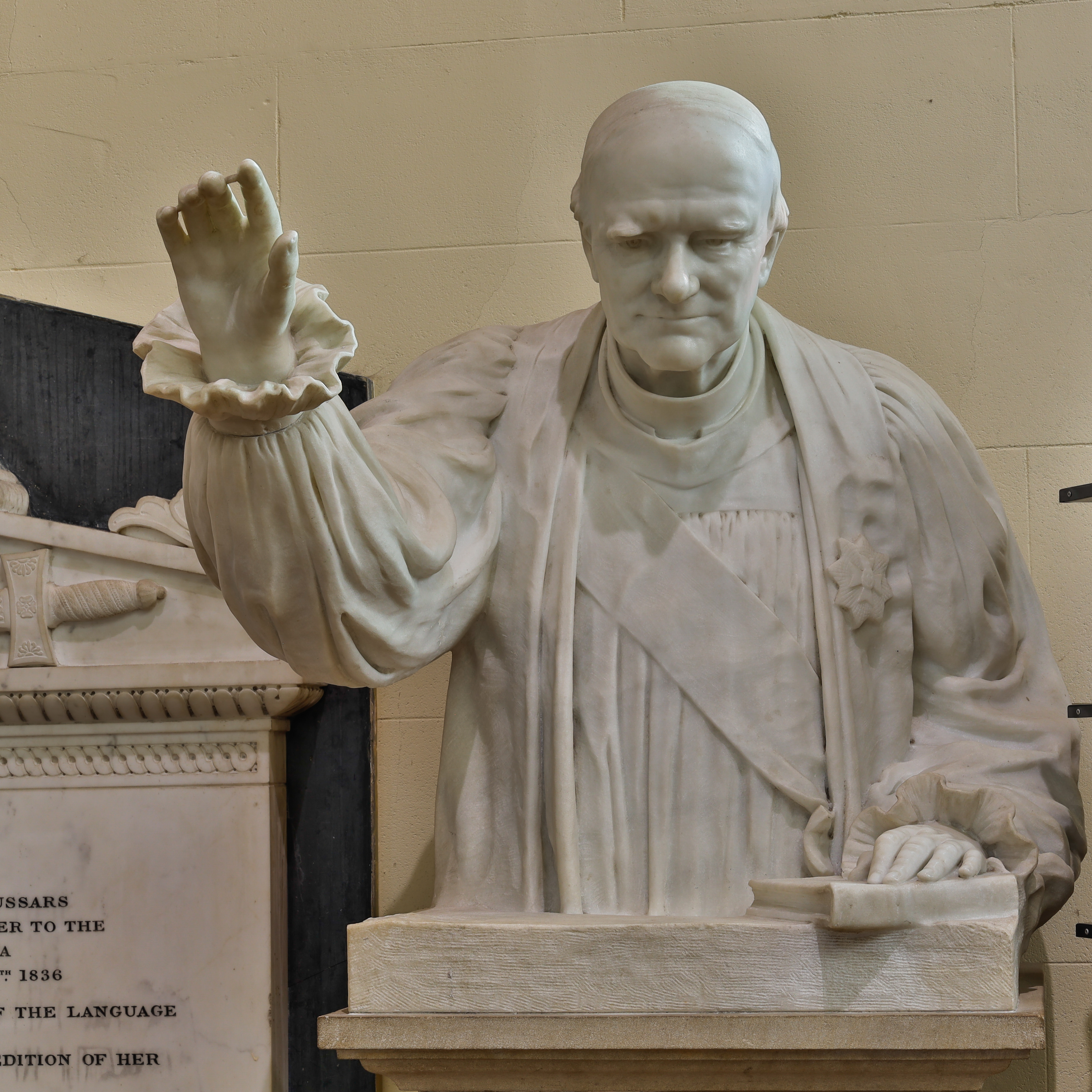
Sculpture of William Alexander in the Church of Ireland Cathedral at Armagh, by Kathleen Shaw

Shaw also studied at some point under Alfred Gilbert. After Rome, she worked for a period in the British Museum, and then returned to Ireland. In 1899 she gave a London address, 49 York Street Chambers; these "Ladies' Residential Chambers" in Bloomsbury were for single professional women.

Advertising tuition in drawing and painting, in 1914, Shaw mentioned that she was a medallist at London's Atelier Ludovici. This was a teaching studio, with a clientele mostly of professional women artists. She gave also details of certifications, and experience in teaching in the Mary Buss schools, and boy's preparatory schools.

Shaw associated with some of the Suffrage Atelier group of 1909–1914, and may have been a member: at this period she had a studio in Hampstead. She was adopted by 1911 by Rosamund or Rosamond Venning (1848–1928), with whom she had once travelled to Athens; Venning was a translator and friend of Hannah Lynch.

== Later life ==
After World War I, Shaw retired to Cadmore End in Buckinghamshire, and lived there in Pitt Cottage. When Venning died in 1928, she made Shaw her executor.

Kathleen Shaw died in 1958. Her eyesight failed, leaving her deafblind and able to communicate with friends only through touch. She spent the last years of her life in hospital, moving out of her cottage in Cadmore End. Her obituarist, the Hon. Mrs. B. R. James had earlier written a biographical article about her in Silent World, the official journal of the Royal National Institute for the Deaf.

== Works ==
Shaw exhibited often, at the Royal Academy and elsewhere. She made numerous portrait busts, particularly of figures in the church and nobility. She made also pieces with mythological and literary associations. She showed two works in the Women's Exhibition at Earl's Court, 1900, "Pomona's Child", and a head of Wilbraham Egerton, 1st Earl Egerton. She was described some years later positively by The Englishwoman's Review as "one of the strenuous few who desires to exhibit only of her best".

In demand for monumental art, Shaw created a memorial for the Royal Irish Fusiliers to commemorate their dead of the Second Anglo-Boer War. It was unveiled in 1906 in Armagh. On public display is a portrait bust 1915 of the Rev. Francis William Tremlett (died 1913), in St Peter, Belsize Park, London. She designed a war memorial for the village of Cadmore End where she lived, which was dedicated in 1920. It took the form of a bronze cover for an octagonal baptismal font. She signed in 1921 a stained glass window, part of a war memorial at the church of Malew, in the Isle of Man.

== Awards and honours ==
Kathleen Shaw had the distinction of being the first female sculptor elected to one of the British academies. The obituary by James states that Shaw was "a member of the Royal Hibernian Academy, the first woman ever elected to that body." The latter statement is incorrect: the first female Honorary Member was Margaret Green (1832–1914), elected in 1878. The Academy admitted female students from 1893. James also erred in assigning her election to 1907; based on a listed date of 1900, she was the third female member, Sarah Purser having been elected in 1890.
