= Faith Celli =

English actress

Celli in 1921

Faith Celli (27 November 1888 – 16 December 1942), born Dorothy Faith Standing, was an English actress, particularly associated with the plays of J. M. Barrie and A. A. Milne. She had a 20-year career from 1907, after which she retired from the stage.

== Life and career ==
Celli was born in Kensington, London, on 27 November 1888, the daughter of the opera singer Francis Standing, known professionally as Frank Celli. She was educated in Belgium and at St Michael's College, St Albans. She became a pupil at the Royal Academy of Dramatic Art, where she was a prize-winner in 1907, her last year there. She was singled out from the students by J. M. Barrie, who cast her in her first professional appearance, playing Tootles in Peter Pan at the Duke of York's Theatre in December, 1907.

Lawrence Grossmith selected Celli for his company at the Savoy Theatre in 1913, playing a comedy by Herbert Westbrook and P. G. Wodehouse. In 1915 she married Lieutenant Reginald Phipps Lamb, with whom she had one son. In October 1917, at Wyndham's Theatre, she made what The Times later considered to be her greatest success as Margaret, the "dream daughter" in J. M. Barrie's Dear Brutus. Barrie said it was Celli who made the play the great success it was, and Margaret was her favourite part. She reprised the role in a 1922 revival.

In The Truth About Blayds, 1921

In 1918 she returned to Peter Pan, this time in the title role, and, according to The Times, "she succeeded in recapturing the mystic winsomeness associated with Miss Nina Boucicault's acting in the original production". Celli was regarded as a versatile actress and she appeared in a wide range of roles, including Clara Eynsford-Hill in Pygmalion at the Aldwych (1920); Emmeline in a stage version of The BIue Lagoon (1920); and Septima in The Truth About Blayds (1921). She made an appearance in a silent comedy film, The Bump, written by A. A. Milne for her and C. Aubrey Smith (1922). The following year she appeared in another Milne play, The Great Broxoff at the St Martin's Theatre, with Edmund Gwenn, Mary Jerrold and Ian Hunter. This was followed by another Milne role, Angela in To Have the Honour (1924).

In 1926 she played Isabella Trench in Somerset Maugham's Caroline (1926), a role created by Marie Lohr, to whom Celli was quite favourably compared. After this she retired from the stage. She later said that although she loved the theatre she had never enjoyed acting and preferred to be in the stalls rather than on stage.

Lamb and Celli divorced in 1930 and the following year she married Colonel the Hon Arthur Murray, later the 3rd Viscount Elibank. There were no children of the marriage.

Celli died in Ascot, Berkshire, on 16 December 1942, aged 54, after a short illness.
