= The Truth About Blayds =

The all-important will: Royce (left), with Marion, Isobel and William, 1921 London production

The Truth About Blayds is a three-act comedy by A. A. Milne, first performed in London in December 1921. It depicts the turmoil into which the family of a revered poet, Oliver Blayds, is plunged when it emerges immediately after his death that the poetry for which he is famous was in fact written by a friend who died young, leaving numerous poems which Blayds passed off over the years as his own work.

After the West End run the play was seen on Broadway and in Australia.

== Background and premiere ==
In the early 1920s A. A. Milne, best known so far for his humorous articles and verses in Punch, was establishing a reputation as a playwright. His Mr Pim Passes By (1919) ran well in the West End and on Broadway. The title role in that play was played by the actor-manager Dion Boucicault, and Milne wrote The Truth About Blayds in 1921 with Boucicault and his wife, Irene Vanbrugh, in mind. They accepted it and the play was put into rehearsal, opening on 20 December 1921 at the Globe Theatre, and running for 121 performances, until 5 April 1922. A Broadway production ran at the Booth Theatre for 108 performances, from 14 March 1922.

=== Original casts ===
Blayds and Isobel, Act 1, 1921 London production

| | London | New York |
|---|---|---|
| Oliver Blayds | Norman McKinnel | O. P. Heggie |
| Isobel (his younger daughter) | Irene Vanbrugh | Alexandra Carlisle |
| Marion Blayds-Conway (his elder daughter) | Irene Rooke | Vane Featherston |
| William Blayds-Conway (his son-in-law and secretary) | Dion Boucicault | Ferdinand Gottschalk |
| Oliver Blayds-Conway (his grandson) | Jack Hobbs | Leslie Howard |
| Septima Blayds-Conway (his granddaughter) | Faith Celli | Frieda Inescort |
| A. L. Royce | Ion Swinley | Gilbert Emery |
| Parsons | Ethel Wellesley | Mary Gayley |

== Plot ==
At his house in Portman Square, London, the famous poet Oliver Blayds is celebrating his 90th birthday. The literary critic A. L. Royce has come to present an address on behalf of his fellow writers to Blayds, who is regarded as "a very great poet, a very great philosopher and a very great man … simple as Wordsworth, sensuous as Tennyson, passionate as Swinburne". Royce has lingering feelings for Isobel Blayds, whom he met 18 years earlier when they were both about 20. She declined his offer of marriage then because she felt she must look after her father. The poet's grandchildren are cheerfully indifferent to his literary reputation, and treat him with affectionate irreverence, to Royce's disapproval.

The family gathers, and after his health is toasted Blayds graciously accepts the address from Royce. He reminisces about his earlier days in Victorian times with anecdotes about Browning, Whistler, Queen Victoria and Meredith. After the celebrations, Blayds is left alone with Isobel, who has looked after him all her adult life. He says at ninety there is no going back: "Only forward – into the grave that's waiting for you".

In the second act the family returns from Blayds's funeral at Westminster Abbey. Isobel reveals that on his deathbed Blayds confessed to her that none of the poems for which he is famous were written by him. They were the work of Willoughby Jenkins, a close friend with whom he shared rooms in Islington in the 1850s. Jenkins, a young poetic genius, knew he was dying and wrote a prodigious amount of poetry while he had time. After he died, Blayds yielded to the temptation to publish a small amount of Jenkins's verse under his own name. It was so well received that he continued the deception and published further batches over the years, gaining a tremendous literary reputation and making a large fortune. The one volume he published of his own verse had been badly reviewed and otherwise his entire poetic oeuvre was the work of his dead friend.

Isobel is bitter at having given up any independent life to look after her fraudulent father. William, who hero-worshipped his father-in-law, is incredulous, and agrees with Oliver that Blayds must have been hallucinating on his deathbed. The family agonise about whether the confession is true, and if so whether to reveal the truth publicly, and whether the old man's fortune properly belongs to Jenkins's heirs. Royce, to whom Isobel has turned for help, finds documentary proof that Jenkins left everything he had to Blayds. The family is legally in the clear, but the moral issue remains. William continues to maintain Blayds's innocence, and Isobel eventually gives way and agrees to say nothing publicly about her father's confession. At the end of the play she accepts a proposal of marriage from Royce.

The Blayds family discuss what to do, 1921 London production. Left to right: William (Dion Boucicault), Marion (Irene Rooke, Royce (Ion Swinley), Isobel (Irene Vanbrugh) and Septima (Faith Celli)

== Critical reception ==
The Times praised Milne and the play, commenting that the theme – a family suddenly learning it has been living on a lie – was reminiscent of Ibsen, although Milne's humorous take on it was very English. The Illustrated London News said, "The play makes admirable comedy, and with the wit and literary finish of its dialogue, its note of sustained irony, its success in raising expectancy in the first act, and developing an interesting idea emotionally in the sequel, stands as quite the best thing Mr Milne has given the stage". When the play opened on Broadway, Alexander Woollcott wrote in The New York Times:

When Milne decided that his first act should usher Blayds out of the world and that the other two should watch the explosion of his confession in its effect on the Blayds household he boldly committed himself to a form which was bound to give his play a diminishing interest. It was inevitable that the first act should be the most telling of the three, and it must be admitted that after the grand old fraud has tottered off to his well-earned grave you miss him terribly about the play. But there is no scene in all that remains which is not written with a keen humor and a sure dramatic instinct. The Truth About Blayds reinforces a dawning suspicion, that this young Mr Milne is the happiest acquisition the English theatre has made since it captured Shaw and Barrie.

Later critical opinion has tended to agree with Woollcott about the balance of the play. Reviewing a provincial production in 1926, The Times commented, "The Truth About Blayds is not Mr Milne's best play, but it does contain the best act that he has ever written. The first act of this play, indeed, is so good that it spoils the balance of the rest of the play". Noël Coward's 1956 play Nude With Violin deals with a similar theme of artistic fraud by a deceased fraudster, and the reviewer in The Tatler, commenting that Milne and Coward had both made a mistake, quoted Barrie's remark to Milne: "I think, in your place, I would have kept the old impostor alive".

== Revivals and adaptations ==
Vanbrugh and Boucicault presented the first Australian production during a tour in 1924. The play was revived on Broadway in 1934, with Heggie again in the title role, Pauline Lord as Isobel and Frederick Worlock as Royce. According to Who's Who in the Theatre there were no West End revivals of the play.

The play was adapted for BBC television in 1948, with Henry Oscar as Blayds and Avice Landone as Isobel. The following year, BBC radio broadcast an adaptation with John Turnbull as Blayds, Marda Vanne as Isobel and Andrew Cruickshank as Royce.

== References and sources ==
=== Sources ===
- Beckerman, Bernard; Howard Siegman (1973). On Stage: Selected Theater Reviews from The New York Times, 1920–1970. New York: Quadrangle. ISBN 978-0-81-290363-8.
- Gaye, Freda, ed. (1967). Who's Who in the Theatre (fourteenth ed.). London: Sir Isaac Pitman and Sons. OCLC 5997224.
- Milne, A. A. (1930). Three Plays. London: Chatto and Windus. OCLC 1069285640.
- Wearing, J. P. (2014). The London Stage 1920–1929: A Calendar of Productions, Performers, and Personnel. Lanham, Maryland: Rowman & Littlefield. ISBN 978-0-8108-9302-3.
