= Rosamond Venning =

British art collector

- Born: 1848; Clapham, Surrey, UK
- Died: 9 July 1928 (aged 79–80); Buckinghamshire, UK
- Other names: Rosamund Venning, Rose Venning
- Occupations: Art collector, folklorist
- Partner: Kathleen Trousdell Shaw

Rosamond Jane Venning (1848 – 9 July 1928), also seen as Rosamund Venning, was a British folklorist, translator, and art collector. She translated works by Tolstoy into English, studied in Athens, campaigned for women's suffrage, and wrote about Cornish burial practices and Russian art.

== Biography ==
Rosamond Jane Venning was born in Clapham, Surrey, the daughter of Samuel Blackaller Venning and Emma Jane Marshall Venning. Her father, a merchant, died by suicide in the year she was born. Her maternal grandfather John Marshall was a bank president in South Africa. Her uncle Francis Ord Marshall was a landowner in Java. Her brother William Marshall Venning was a lawyer interested in women's rights under Roman law.

Rosamond Venning stayed at the American School of Classical Studies in Athens while she was touring in the 1880s. She and Hannah Lynch met in Greece and traveled together; Lynch dedicated her 1891 study of novelist George Meredith to Venning. Her close friend Kathleen Trousdell Shaw made a portrait bas-relief sculpture of Venning in 1892. Venning supported the cause of women's suffrage. She was an honorary member of the Society for the Promotion of Hellenic Studies.

Venning supported the Women's Social and Political Union (WSPU). She adopted he longtime friend Kathleen Trousdell Shaw, and the two lived together in London and in Buckinghamshire. Venning died in 1928, and left her estate to Shaw.

== Publications ==
- Tolstoy, "The Pilgrims" (1887, translated by Venning from Russian)
- "A Russian Sculptor" (1889)
- Tolstoy, The Archbishop and the Three Old Men (1893; translated by Venning from Russian)
- "Burial of teeth with body in Cornwall" (1894)
- "Yanni: An Athenian Model" (1898)
