= Jessie Bateman =

British actress (1877–1940)

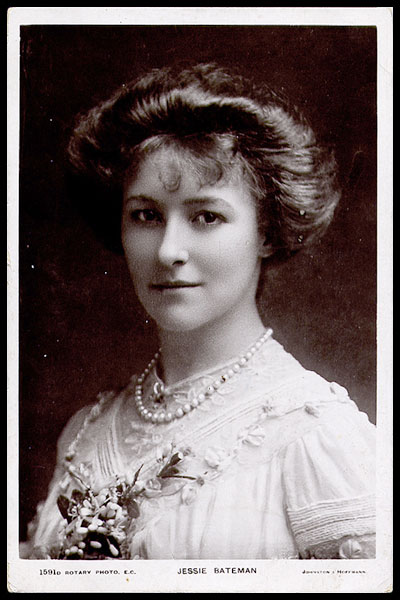
- Born: 2 August 1877; United Kingdom
- Died: 14 November 1940 (aged 63); United Kingdom
- Occupation: Actress
- Spouses: George Augustus Ashfordby-Trenchard (1894–1902) (his death); Wilfred G. Chancellor

Jessie Eliza Bateman (2 August 1877 – 14 November 1940) was an English stage actress. Bateman began her career as a child actress. After early success on tour in Shakespearean roles, she built her career both in London and foreign tours. She had her greatest success in the early years of the 20th century, and her career spanned over half a century.

== Biography ==
Bateman made her first professional appearance aged ten at the Alhambra Theatre in a series of ballets. In 1889, she had her first dramatic role at the Globe Theatre as "Cobweb" in A Midsummer Night's Dream. In 1890, she appeared at The Prince of Wales Theatre in The Rose and the King and in 1891 in Arthur Sullivan's grand opera, Ivanhoe at The Royal English Opera House.

Bateman spent the next five years with F. R. Benson's Shakespearean touring company, playing increasingly important roles, including Titania in A Midsummer Night's Dream and Celia in As You Like It. In 1894 she married George Augustus Ashfordby-Trenchard. He began a military career but soon turned to acting. In 1896, she returned to London and played at the Comedy Theatre, appearing in The Guinea Stamp and Mr Martin.

She was then employed by George Edwardes for a tour of South Africa. There she played a variety of leading roles in such works as The Little Minister, a comedy by J. M. Barrie, Secret Service, a serio-drama, and Under the Red Robe, a romantic drama. After a brief return the London in 1898, she toured the United States in the title role of Peggy Stubbs and in H. Reeves-Smith's play, A Brace of Partridges. She returned to London with Reeves-Smith, starring with him at the Royalty Theatre as Connie in A Little Ray of Sunshine. In 1899, she joined Charles Hawtrey's company at the Avenue Theatre in the role of Minnie Templar in A Message from Mars, then touring in that role in America and playing it again at The Prince of Wales Theatre in London. When the Second Boer War began in 1899, Bateman's husband resumed his military career but died in South Africa in 1902.

In 1904, Bateman starred as Fairy Rosebud in W. S. Gilbert's The Fairy's Dilemma at the Garrick Theatre. Around this time, she also starred as Fanny in The Clandestine Marriage, Nell'in Everybody's Secret, Imogen in The Cabinet Minister, and Acacia Dean in Lucky Miss Dean and with Cyril Maude in Beauty and the Barge. She joined Gerald du Maurier in 1906 as Gwendoline Conran in Raffles at the Comedy Theatre, which ran for 351 performances, perhaps her greatest success to that date. When the run ended in 1907, she married Wilfred G. Chancellor with whom she had three children.

In 1909 she returned to the stage appearing in The Merry Devil at the Playhouse Theatre as Madame de Tessenari. She appeared in a revival of The Whip, by Cecil Raleigh and Henry Hamilton, at Theatre Royal, Drury Lane in 1910 (in which she rode a horse astride). Playgoer and Society Illustrated wrote, "It would be difficult to find a sweeter Lady Diana Sartorys than Miss Jessie Bateman". She continued her stage career for more than twenty years thereafter and also appeared as Mrs. Wayne in a short film, Account Rendered, in 1932. She made her last major appearance on stage in 1933 at the Queen's Theatre in Spendlove Hall.

Bateman died in 1940 at the age of 63.
