= The Fairy's Dilemma =

Play by W. S. Gilbert

Jessie Bateman as the Fairy

Harlequin and the Fairy's Dilemma, retitled The Fairy's Dilemma shortly after the play opened, is a play in two acts by W. S. Gilbert that parodies the harlequinade that concluded 19th-century pantomimes.

It was produced at the Garrick Theatre by Arthur Bourchier, lessee of the theatre, on 3 May 1904 and ran for 90 performances, closing on 22 July 1904. The work was Gilbert's last full-length play.

== Background ==
The Fairy's Dilemma, "an original domestic pantomime in two acts", was W. S. Gilbert's first play produced since The Fortune Hunter in 1897. He had announced a retirement from the theatre after the poor reception of that play. In 1900, he wrote a story called "The Fairy's Dilemma", published in the Christmas number of The Graphic magazine that year. In 1904, he emerged from his seven-year "retirement" to adapt the story into a play, which he directed himself, as he usually did with his plays. The Fairy's Dilemma was Gilbert's only play premiered at the Garrick Theatre, which he had built in 1889. Incidental music for the piece was arranged by Edmond Rickett, consisting of popular songs of the 1860s and 1870s, such as "Champagne Charlie". The Fairy's Dilemma was Gilbert's last full-length non-musical play.

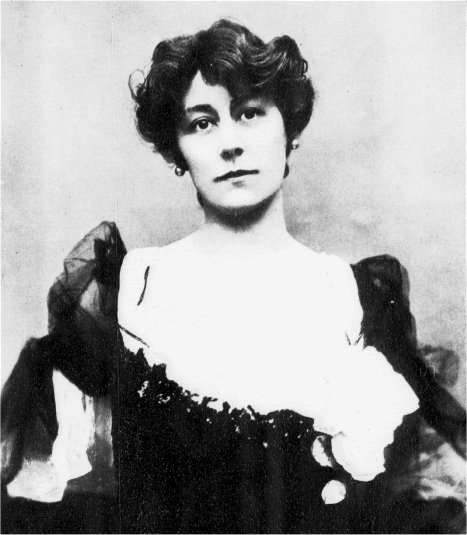
Violet Vanbrugh

Arthur Bourchier had leased the Garrick in 1900, and he and his wife Violet Vanbrugh starred in numerous plays there over the next six years often producing new works, including The Fairy's Dilemma. The piece garnered enthusiastic opening-night reviews in London on 3 May 1904. According to The New York Times, the play "met with distinct success. It is brilliantly nonsensical". The Daily Telegraph called it "a new sensation". The Manchester Guardian wrote, "The piece kept the whole house laughing almost without intermission during the two short hours of its duration.... It restores Mr. Gilbert to the stage in his most irresistibly whimsical vein, and deserves to rank among the brightest and most exhilarating of his productions." The Observer noted its "immense superiority", "fresh dramatic wit" and the audience's "sensation of delight not less keen than rare", while opining that "age cannot wither" Gilbert's "finish and precision... his mordant wit" and his "brilliant fun". Max Beerbohm, writing in The Saturday Review, however, criticised the show for being more appropriate to the 1870s.

The Fairy's Dilemma is a parody of the conventional harlequinade and of melodrama. However, the play was written decades after the heyday of the harlequinade. Houses were good at first, but despite its initial success and good reviews, the audience dwindled, and it lasted only 90 performances and was withdrawn on 22 July 1904. Violet Vanbrugh speculated that too few theatregoers remembered the old harlequinade well enough to enjoy the parody. Nevertheless, the piece was sent on a brief tour.

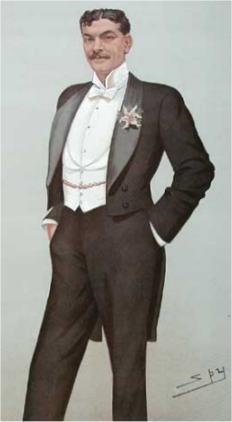
Arthur Bourchier

== Roles and original cast ==
Supernaturals

- Fairy Rosebud – Jessie Bateman
- Demon Alcohol – Jerrold Robertshaw
- Imps, Goblins, Fairies, etc.

Unnaturals

- Col. Sir Trevor Mauleverer, Baronet, a fastidious Life Guardsman/Clown – Arthur Bourchier
- The Rev. Aloysius Parfitt, a clergyman/Harlequin – O. B. Clarence
- Mr. Justice Whortle/Pantaloon – Sydney Valentine
- Lady Angela Wealdstone, Daughter of the Marquis of Harrow (disguised as Jane Collins)/Columbine – Violet Vanbrugh
- Clarissa Whortle – Dorothy Grimstone
- Mrs. Crumble, Housekeeper to Mr. Parfitt – Miss Ewell

== Synopsis ==
Act I

The Rev. Aloysius Parfitt and Sir Trevor Mauleverer

Fairy Rosebud enters the Abode of Demon Alcohol, who complains bitterly about the law that requires demons to speak in verse; and indeed he is very bad at it. Rosebud is depressed because the Fairy Queen has told her that her incompetence can no longer be tolerated; unless she becomes more attentive to her duties of protecting mortals from demons, she will be sent to the back row of the ballet chorus. She had decided to protect and assist Aloysius Parfitt, a clergyman, and Jane Collins, a nurse. Jane has attracted the attention of Sir Trevor Mauleverer, a colonel in the Life Guards, who Rosebud believes to be a wicked baronet. Rosebud asks the demon to carry Jane off to Sir Trevor's apartment (making it look as if Sir Trevor has had her carried off) so that Rosebud can then rescue Jane and restore her to Aloysius. The demon is attracted to Rosebud and agrees. However, Jane is really Lady Angela Wealdstone, a lady of fashion, in disguise, and Sir Trevor is really an honourable man. Nevertheless, Lady Angela has run away from home to avoid being forced by her father into an arranged marriage with Sir Trevor.

Meanwhile, however, Aloysius is in love with Clarissa Whortle, the daughter of a judge. Sir Trevor has led everyone to believe that he is going to marry Clarissa to assist Aloysius in evading Clarissa's father. Aloysius, on the other hand, has allowed everyone to believe that he will marry Jane. Before going to the Registrar to be married, Aloysius decides that Clarissa's clothing is too fashionable, so Clarissa borrows Jane's nurse attire. Rosebud appears and the mortals criticise her because her skirts are too short. No one wants her assistance, but she explains (mistaking Clarissa for Jane because of the change of clothing) that a demon is planning to carry off the lady. She vanishes, and everyone is angry with her, thinking her rude. Now Demon Alcohol meets Sir Trevor, who has been left alone. The demon is also confused by the change of clothing; he abducts Clarissa (thinking her to be Jane) and takes her to Sir Trevor's lodgings.

Act II

"The transformed quartette read of their doings in The Times"

Behind the house of the judge (Clarissa's father), the demon and Rosebud meet. He tells her, mistakenly, that he has abducted the nurse and brought her to Sir Trevor's flat. Rosebud summons the fairies to help her "rescue" the girl, whom she assumes is Jane. Aloysius now arrives to tell the judge of Clarissa's disappearance. Rosebud magically summons Jane (alias Lady Angela), still thinking that it was Jane who was abducted, and Lady Angela magically appears, wearing only her dressing jacket. Rosebud is angry at the demon for carrying off the wrong lady. The only solution, she thinks, is to transform the mortals into harlequinade characters. She changes Parfitt into Harlequin, Jane into Columbine, the judge into Pantaloon and Sir Trevor into Clown. All are angry, but Rosebud insists that they play the harlequinade and uses her magic to force them to do so.

While Rosebud looks on, everyone is affected by the magic and must play their harlequinade parts. When she is not watching, however, they regain their true personalities and are all horrified at the excesses of their harlequinade characters. Matters go from bad to worse, and Rosebud finally relents, agreeing to marry the demon and asking Aloysius to perform the ceremony. All are restored to their original characters, Aloysius embraces Clarissa, and Sir Trevor embraces Lady Angela.

== Analysis ==
Jerrold Robertshaw as the Demon Alcohol

Gilbert had always been fascinated by pantomime, particularly the harlequinade that concluded every pantomime in the early and mid-Victorian era. When Gilbert was growing up, the harlequinade was an extremely popular part of the Christmas pantomimes that were produced at most of the major theatres in London. Gilbert admired the elegant dancing part of the Harlequin and in 1879 played this character in a pantomime that he co-authored, The Forty Thieves. Many of Gilbert's Bab Ballads, stories and other works, especially in the 1860s, reflect his interest in the harlequinade and his ideas about the moral issues that it presented, particularly in connection with the cruel character of Clown.

After writing and thinking about the harlequinade for half a century, and like some of Gilbert's earlier works, The Fairy's Dilemma "sets pantomime fantasy alongside modern everyday life... a harlequinade parodied and subverted." As The Observer noted in their opening night review of the piece, Gilbert turns inside out, as no other dramatist could do as well, conventional Christmas pantomimes, "with their good fairies and wicked demons supernaturally influencing the destinies of unnatural lovers.... Mr. Gilbert makes the goodness of the Fairy Rosebud as perfunctory as the wickedness of the Demon Alcohol; and it is she who, with a view to her own professional advancement, invents for the Demon the malignant plot". Further, in a parody of the melodramatic conventions of the Victorian era, the bad baronet is not bad, the innocent damsel is not innocent, and the stern judge delights in entertaining his court. When the judge turns into Pantaloon, he exclaims, "it's not as great a change as I should have supposed!" As with Gilbert's typical comedies, the joke "depends for much of its point upon the grave unconsciousness of its interpreters".

According to scholar Andrew Crowther, the play explores two ideas that are an important part of many of Gilbert's stage works, including the famous Gilbert and Sullivan operas. "One is that stage romance and fantasy should be brought down to earth with reminders of prosaic reality. The other is that real life should take on some of the romance and fantasy of the stage." Crowther notes that in the play, the "supernatural" fairy and demon speak in a more natural manner than the mortals, who Gilbert calls "unnaturals". The play shows the tension between Gilbert's love of the harlequinade and his disapproval of the morality that it portrays. After a lifetime of fascination with the subject, the play resolves Gilbert's deep interest in the subject. According to Crowther, in many ways, the play was the capstone of Gilbert's career. He would write no more full-length plays and only one further opera (Fallen Fairies).
