= Irene Vanbrugh =

English actress (1872–1949)

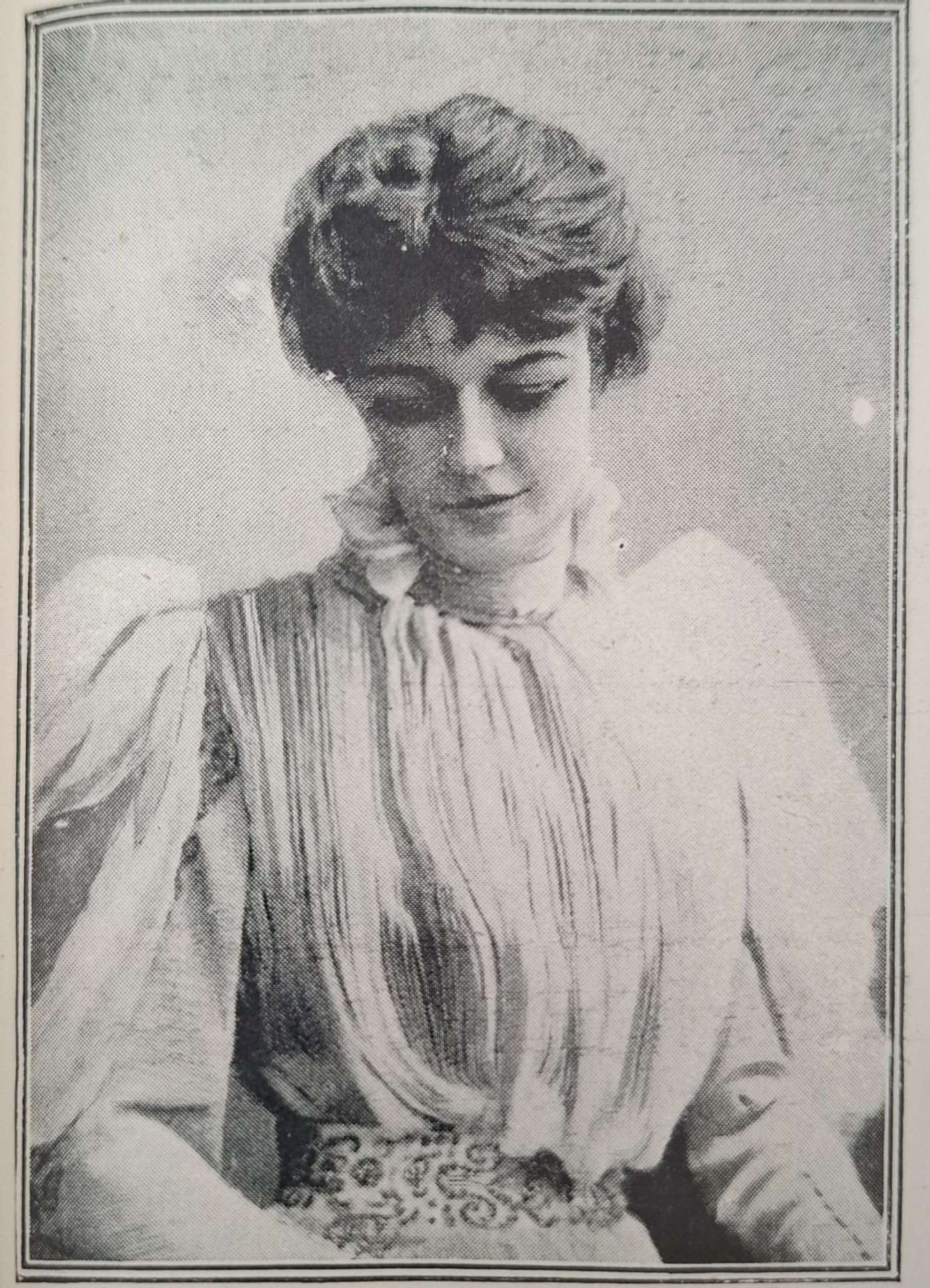
Photo of Vanbrugh in the Black & White Budget, 20 October 1900

Vanbrugh c. 1900

Dame Irene Boucicault (née Barnes; 2 December 1872 – 30 November 1949), known professionally as Irene Vanbrugh (/aɪˈrini ˈvænbrə/), was an English actress. The daughter of a clergyman, Vanbrugh followed her elder sister Violet into the theatrical profession and sustained a career for more than 50 years.

After appearing in supporting roles with J. L. Toole, Herbert Beerbohm Tree, George Alexander and others, she graduated to leading roles in the 1890s, creating such roles as Gwendolen in Oscar Wilde's The Importance of Being Earnest (1895), and establishing her reputation in Arthur Pinero's The Gay Lord Quex (1899). In her early days as a leading lady she was particularly associated with Pinero's plays and later had parts written for her by James Barrie, Bernard Shaw, Somerset Maugham, A. A. Milne and Noël Coward. More famous for comic than for dramatic roles, Vanbrugh nevertheless played many of the latter both in modern works and in the classics. Her stage début was in Shakespeare, but she seldom acted in his plays later in her career; exceptions were her Queen Gertrude in Hamlet in 1931 and her Meg Page in The Merry Wives of Windsor, opposite her sister Violet as Alice Ford, in 1934.

Best known as a stage performer, Vanbrugh appeared in three silent films in the 1910s but did not return to the cinema until the mid-1930s; she made ten films over the following decade. She appeared frequently in fundraising shows for various charities, and was active over many years in the support of the Royal Academy of Dramatic Art in London, of which her brother Kenneth was principal. After her death the academy's new theatre was named the Vanbrugh Theatre in honour of her and her sister.

== Life and career ==
=== Early years ===
Vanbrugh was born in Exeter, Devon, on 2 December 1872, the youngest daughter and fifth child of six of the Rev Reginald Henry Barnes, Prebendary of Exeter Cathedral and Vicar of Heavitree, and his wife, Frances Mary Emily, née Nation, daughter of a barrister. Irene's eldest sister Violet and younger brother Kenneth also made theatrical careers. Irene was educated at Exeter High School and at schools in Paris. When the Barnes family moved to London in the mid-1880s, she attended a school near Earls Court recommended by the actress Ellen Terry, a family friend. After seeing Vanbrugh in a school play, Terry commented, "Irene, you seem to be a professional acting with amateurs".

As Lewis Carroll's White Queen, 1888

It was also at Terry's suggestion that Violet, on starting a theatrical career, adopted the stage name Vanbrugh. Irene was encouraged by her sister's early success to follow her into the theatrical profession, also with the stage name Vanbrugh. In his memoir An Actor in His Time (1979) Sir John Gielgud described the two:

The Vanbrugh sisters were remarkably alike in appearance. Tall and imposing, beautifully spoken, they moved with grace. ... They were elegantly but never ostentatiously dressed, entering and leaving the stage with unerring authority. ... Violet never struck me as a natural comedienne, as Irene was.

As her elder sister had done, Irene joined Sarah Thorne's repertory company at the Theatre Royal, Margate, as a student. For a fee Thorne would take pupils into her company, but the Vanbrugh girls showed such promise they were accepted free of charge. Violet was playing leading roles by the time Irene arrived at Margate two years after her, in August 1888. Irene recalled Thorne as an excellent teacher, adding, "We played every kind of play there; comedy, farce, and drama of the deepest dye; while at Christmas there came the pantomime, so that the Juliet of a week ago might be the Prince Paragon of the Yule-tide extravaganza." As a student her first appearance on stage was in August 1888, as the capricious shepherdess Phoebe in As You Like It at the Theatre Royal, in a cast led by Violet as Rosalind.

=== Early roles ===
Lewis Carroll, a college friend of Vanbrugh's father, saw her performing in Margate and was impressed. On his recommendation she made her London début in December 1888, playing the White Queen and the Knave of Hearts in a revival of Alice in Wonderland at the old Globe Theatre. Her sister Edith joined her in this production. Some of Violet's early theatrical work had been with J. L. Toole. Irene emulated her and joined his company in 1889, playing in established comedy successes including Dion Boucicault's Dot and H. J. Byron's Uncle Dick's Darling.

When Toole toured Australia and New Zealand in 1890–91 Vanbrugh was a member of his company, acting in every play in its repertoire. She later commented:

I think this was even better training than Miss Thorne's school; not only was I constantly playing a new part, but I was constantly playing to a different type of audience. We visited all sorts of Australian cities, large and small, and one was pretty certain before long to find out the weak points in one's method."

After nearly a year the company returned to London. Vanbrugh remained a member and played her first original roles as Thea Tesman in James Barrie's burlesque Ibsen's Ghost (1891), and as Bell Golightly in Barrie's comedy Walker, London (1892), which ran for 497 performances.

=== First West End successes ===
As Gwendolen in The Importance of Being Earnest, 1895: l. to r. Allan Aynesworth, Evelyn Millard, Vanbrugh and George Alexander

Although she was happy in Toole's company, by 1893 Vanbrugh felt the need to widen her experience. She joined Herbert Beerbohm Tree at the Haymarket Theatre as the serving-maid Lettice in The Tempter (1893) by Henry Arthur Jones. The play was not popular and was taken off after 73 performances; in 1894, after three more productions in Tree's company, she was engaged by George Alexander at the St James's Theatre. There she had more success in Jones's next play, The Masqueraders, in a supporting role to Alexander and Mrs Patrick Campbell in the leads. In Alexander's company she played Fanny in Henry James's drama Guy Domville, which closed after 32 performances, and in 1895 created the role of the Honourable Gwendolen Fairfax in The Importance of Being Earnest.

When Arthur Bourchier, who had married Violet Vanbrugh, launched himself as an actor-manager in 1895, Irene joined them at the Royalty Theatre and on tour, winning good notices as Dulcie in The Chili Widow and in the title role of the comedy Kitty Clive. She went with the Bourchier company to America, making her Broadway début in November 1896 in The Chili Widow. After her return to London in 1898 she appeared at the Criterion Theatre with Charles Wyndham in October 1897, as Lady Rosamund Tatton in Jones's comedy The Liars.

In January 1898 she joined John Hare's company at the Court Theatre, where she created the roles of Rose Trelawny in Trelawny of the Wells by Arthur Pinero, and Stella de Gex in Robert Marshall's His Excellency the Governor. A fellow member of Hare's company was Dion Boucicault Jr. (known as "Dot" to family and friends), son of his more famous namesake. They had met while Vanbrugh was in Australia with Toole's touring company, and for six months they were together in Hare's highly successful American tour, playing in Boston, Philadelphia, Washington and Chicago. Boucicault proposed to her while Trelawny of the Wells was playing in London, but she did not accept him straight away and they were not married until three years later.

As Sophy in The Gay Lord Quex, 1899

In 1899 Vanbrugh played the role that made her name – Sophy Fullgarney in Pinero's The Gay Lord Quex. This part, a Cockney manicurist, was quite different from any she had played before, but Pinero was insistent that she should play it. In the words of the biographer S. R. Littlewood, "Vanbrugh's intelligence, sympathy, and alertness avoided extravagance in a subtle expression of class-contrast. This gave the character an intensity of appeal that was at the time something quite new." A contemporary critic commented, "She has sprung all at once into the ranks of the leading actresses of our day". The play was regarded as risqué, and one critic commented that had Lewis Carroll still been alive, he would have approved of "Miss Vanbrugh's greatest triumph" but probably not of the play.

By the turn of the century Vanbrugh's reputation was established. In Boyle Lawrence's 1900 survey of leading stage performers the chapter on Vanbrugh begins:

In Miss Irene Vanbrugh we have one of the most distinguished of comediennes. That much can be said without fear of contradiction. […] She has a sprightliness, a verve, a quick intelligence which mark her out as an actress of comedy in which she has very few equals. In addition to this she is the fortunate possessor of that rare quality we call "style", seen in so few actors or actresses of the younger generation. And, like all real comediennes, she has just that touch of pathos which makes the whole world akin.

=== Early 20th century ===
In July 1901 Vanbrugh and Boucicault married, at a private ceremony in Buxton, where her uncle was the vicar of St John's Church. The couple frequently appeared together for the rest of Boucicault's life, and he became her manager in 1915. They had no children.

As Lady Mary in The Admirable Crichton, 1902

Between the turn of the century and the First World War Vanbrugh had leading roles in new plays by J. M. Barrie, Pinero and Somerset Maugham. The Barrie plays were The Admirable Crichton (1902), Alice-Sit-by-the Fire (1905), and Rosalind (1912). In the second of these she had an adverse review. In The Saturday Review Max Beerbohm contrasted Vanbrugh with her co-star, Ellen Terry, whom Beerbohm thought more attuned to Barrie's childlike innocence, whereas with Vanbrugh, "Her personality is in no way Barrieish. She looks, indeed, quite young enough for her part; but her soul is not childish enough."

The three Pinero plays starring Vanbrugh in this period had mixed fortunes. Her own notices for Letty (1903) were excellent, but the play closed after 64 performances. His House in Order (1906) was a considerable success for Vanbrugh, Alexander and Pinero, running for 430 performances. Her performance in Mid-Channel (1909) was highly praised, but the play was not, and closed after 58 performances. Vanbrugh's Maugham roles were in the drama Grace (1910) and the romance The Land of Promise (1914). The critics were more complimentary about the acting than the plays, which ran for 72 and 76 performances respectively. She also starred in new plays by Charles Haddon Chambers (Passers-By, 1911) and A. E. W. Mason (Open Windows, 1913).

Away from the West End theatre, Vanbrugh went on the music-hall stage with Barrie's one-act play The Twelve-Pound Look in 1911, co-starring with Edmund Gwenn in a variety bill in which W. C. Fields also appeared. Over the next four years she appeared in other Barrie pieces – Half an Hour and Rosalind – and Maugham's The Land of Promise, written with her in mind. In 1913 Vanbrugh played Lady Gay Spanker in a revival of Boucicault senior's London Assurance in an all-star cast including Herbert Tree, Charles Hawtrey, Arthur Bourchier, Weedon Grossmith and Marie Tempest. This was one of the many charity fund-raising productions in which Vanbrugh appeared throughout her career, such as a starrily cast The School for Scandal in 1915 in which she played Lady Teazle to Tree's Sir Peter.

Nina Sevening (l), Vanbrugh and Lillah McCarthy in Somerset Maugham's comedy Caroline, 1916

=== First World War ===
During the war Vanbrugh played a succession of leading roles in the West End, beginning with The Spirit of Culture in Barrie's war play Der Tag (1914). Following this, she played Lady Falkland in a melodrama, The Right to Kill (1915); the title role in Maugham's comedy Caroline (1916); Mrs Lytton in a crime drama, The Riddle (1916); Emily Ladew in the comedy Her Husband's Wife (1916); Leonora in Barrie's Seven Women (1917); and the title role in A. A. Milne's Belinda (1918).

In 1916 Vanbrugh appeared in a film, The Real Thing at Last (1916); the following year she starred in two more silent films, Masks and Faces, playing Peg Woffington, and The Gay Lord Quex, as Sophy, with Ben Webster as Quex and a supporting cast that included Lilian Braithwaite, Margaret Bannerman and Donald Calthrop. She told a journalist, "Film acting is a delightful experience, but for me it can never take the place of the stage." She did not return to films until 1933.

From its early days, Vanbrugh was closely connected with the Royal Academy of Dramatic Art (RADA). (Note: Until it received its royal charter in 1920 it was known as the Academy of Dramatic Art.) Her younger brother, Kenneth Barnes, had been its principal since 1909. The 1917 film of Masks and Faces had been made at her instigation to raise funds for the academy's partly completed theatre and she gathered a star cast, including not only leading actors but the playwrights Bernard Shaw, Pinero and Barrie in cameo appearances.

Vanbrugh was a governor of the Elizabeth Garrett Anderson Hospital in the Euston Road, London, and in June 1918 she organised a matinee concert at the London Palladium to raise funds for the endowment of a bed at the hospital for the use of any woman connected to the theatrical profession.

=== Inter-war years ===
With her husband, Dion Boucicault, Jr., in The Truth About Blayds, 1922

Vanbrugh's first big stage success of the post-war years was in Milne's Mr Pim Passes By in 1920. She and her husband opened it in Manchester, and such was its reception that they brought it into the West End. In early 1923 they sailed to South Africa and then Australia and New Zealand for a tour which included a repertory of twelve plays, among which were Belinda, Miss Nell o' New Orleans, The Truth About Blayds, The Second Mrs Tanqueray, His House in Order, The Notorious Mrs Ebbsmith, Trelawney of the Wells, and Mr Pim Passes By.

The couple returned to Britain in January 1926. After a pre-London tour in the comedy All the King’s Horses, Vanbrugh and Allan Aynesworth starred in the piece at the Globe Theatre. At the Playhouse in June she resumed the title part in a revival of Caroline and at the Comedy Theatre the following January she played the Baroness della Rocca in Alfred Sutro's comedy The Desperate Lovers. Returning to music hall in April 1927 she played Clarissa Marlow in a short comedy by Milne, at the London Coliseum, Miss Marlow at Play. She and Boucicault then returned to Australia for another tour, but he became ill and the couple returned to England, where he died at their house in Hurley, Berkshire, on 25 June 1929.

Vanbrugh's other appearances in the inter-war years included Gertrude to Henry Ainley's Hamlet in 1931, Millicent Jordan in Dinner at Eight (1933) and Mistress Page in The Merry Wives of Windsor with Violet as Mistress Ford (1934). This was the first time the sisters had acted together since 1895. The following year she played the role of the Duchess of Marlborough in Norman Ginsbury's historical drama Viceroy Sarah (1935).

Vanbrugh returned to films in 1933, as Mrs Powis-Porter in Head of the Family; between then and 1945 she appeared in Catherine the Great, Girls Will Be Boys, The Way of Youth, Youthful Folly, Escape Me Never, Wings of the Morning, Knight Without Armour, It Happened One Sunday, and I Live in Grosvenor Square.

In 1938 Vanbrugh played Lady Messiter in Noël Coward's Operette at His Majesty's Theatre, London. It was a short but pivotal role with a single scene described by the critic Sheridan Morley as "a very difficult ten-minute scene", and by Coward himself as a boring scene that Vanbrugh played "with impeccable dignity". During the run of Operette Vanbrugh celebrated her golden jubilee as an actress with a gala charity matinee at His Majesty's attended by the Queen. Violet Vanbrugh, Coward, Edith Evans, Gladys Cooper, Seymour Hicks (Note: Hicks and his wife Ellaline Terriss also celebrated their golden jubilees in 1938. The London Critics' Circle, which had its silver jubilee in that year, held a dinner to honour all three performers in March 1938.) and many other leading performers took part. The matinee raised £2,245 (equivalent to £130,649 in 2025), which Vanbrugh donated to the Elizabeth Garrett Anderson Hospital and the Theatrical Ladies' Guild. The following year Vanbrugh created the role of Catherine of Braganza in Shaw's In Good King Charles's Golden Days.

=== Later years ===
During the Battle of Britain in 1940 the Vanbrugh sisters carried out what Littlewood calls "a characteristic piece of war work" by giving, with Donald Wolfit, lunchtime performances at the Strand Theatre of extracts from The Merry Wives of Windsor and at the National Gallery. Throughout the war, Vanbrugh appeared in the West End and on tour in new plays, revivals of her earlier successes, and classics. Almost 50 years after her first appearance in a Wilde play, she played Lady Markby in An Ideal Husband in 1943–1944, giving a performance characterised by The Times as "comic perfection".

Vanbrugh was working to the end of her life. In early November 1949 she appeared in Mary Bonaventure in its pre-London run but was taken ill before the West End opening and died on 30 November 1949, shortly before her 77th birthday.

=== Honours and commemorations ===
Vanbrugh was created a Dame Commander of the Order of the British Empire (DBE) in 1941. (Note: The official announcement in The London Gazette reads "Irene, Mrs Dion Boucicault (Miss Irene Vanbrugh). For services to the Stage".) After her death, the new theatre for the Royal Academy of Dramatic Art was named the Vanbrugh Theatre in honour of Vanbrugh and her sister. The theatre, located in Gower Street, London, was opened in 1954 by Queen Elizabeth the Queen Mother. (Note: The theatre has since been renamed the Jerwood Vanbrugh Theatre.)

At a matinee marking RADA's golden jubilee in 1954, in the presence of Irene Vanbrugh's brother, Sir Kenneth Barnes, who was still the principal of the academy, Edith Evans read a poem by A. P. Herbert in which Vanbrugh was celebrated among the leading names of British theatre. Herbert wrote:

All the great names that give our past a glow,
Bancroft and Irving, Barrie and Boucicault,
Vanbrugh and Playfair, Terry, Kendal, Maude,
Gilbert and Grossmith loudly we applaud.

== Notes, references and sources ==
=== Sources ===
- Burrow, John (1936). St Pancras Past and Present: Official Guide. Burrow's Guides to the London Boroughs (seventh ed.). Cheltenham: J. D. Burrow. OCLC 940379415.
- Coward, Noël (1950). The Collected Plays of Noël Coward, Volume 2. London: Heinemann. OCLC 223059271.
- Dawick, John (1993). Pinero: A Theatrical Life. Niwot: University of Colorado Press. ISBN 0-87-081302-1.
- Gielgud, John (1979). An Actor and His Time. London: Sidgwick and Jackson. ISBN 0-28-398573-9.
- Johns, Eric (1974). Dames of the Theatre. London: W. H. Allen. ISBN 0-49-101591-7.
- Lawrence, Boyle (1900). Celebrities of the Stage. London: George Newnes. OCLC 587026.
- Mander, Raymond; Joe Mitchenson (1955). Theatrical Companion to Maugham. London: Rockliffe. OCLC 1336174067.
- Maugham, W. Somerset (1931). Collected Plays. London: Heinemann. OCLC 1101215909.
- Morley, Sheridan (1986). The Great Stage Actors. London: Angus and Robertson. ISBN 0-20-714970-4.
- Parker, John, ed. (1939). Who's Who in the Theatre (ninth ed.). London: Sir Isaac Pitman and Sons. OCLC 238830877.
- Vanbrugh, Irene (1948). To Tell My Story. London: Hutchinson. OCLC 1841262.
- Wearing, J. P. (1976). The London Stage, 1890–1899: A Calendar of Plays and Players. Metuchen: Scarecrow Press. ISBN 0-81-080910-9.
