= Garrick Theatre =

West End theatre in London

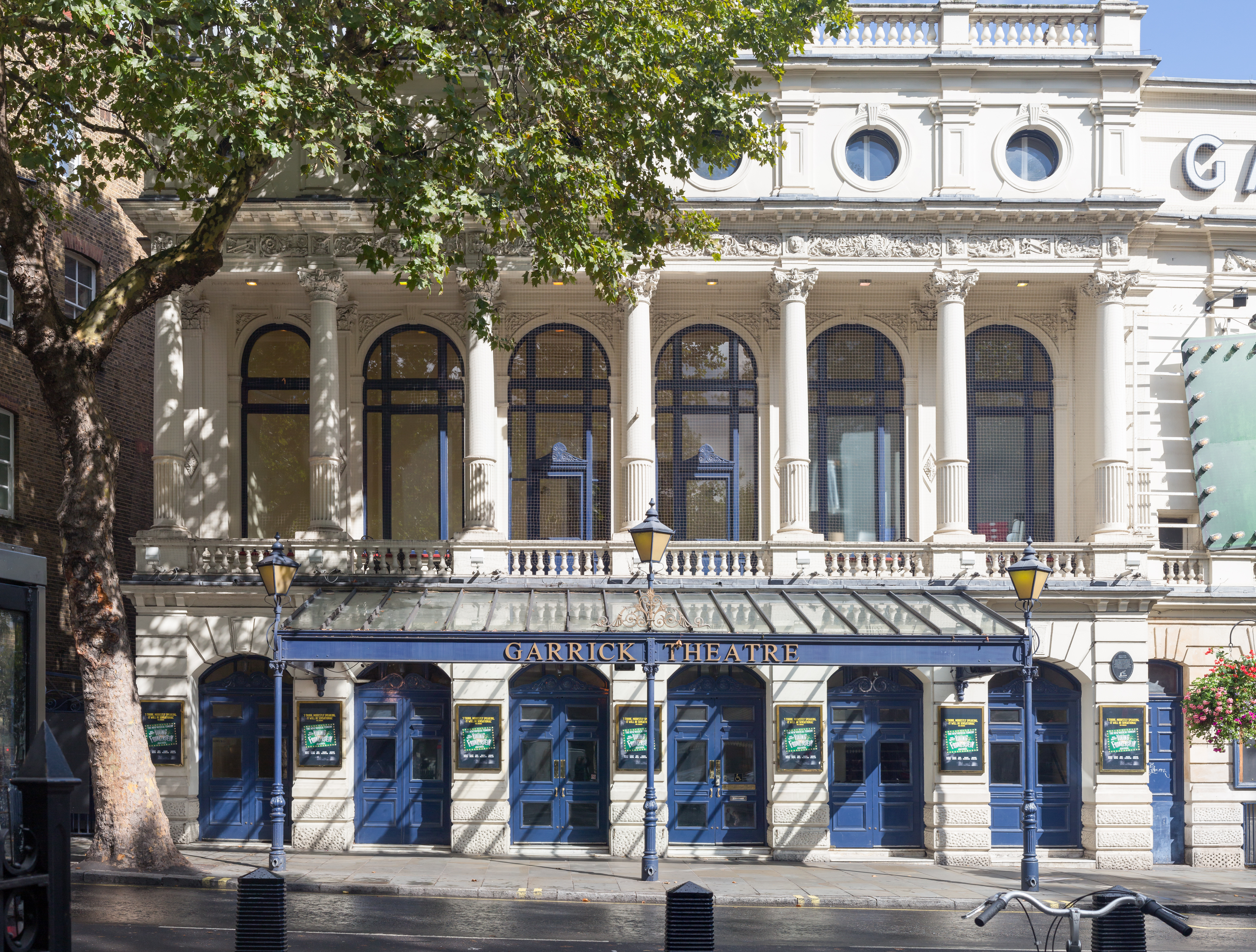
- Garrick Theatre in 2017
- Interactive map of Garrick Theatre
- Address: Charing Cross Road; London, WC2, UK
- Coordinates: 51°30′36″N 0°7′40″W
- Owner: Nimax Theatres
- Capacity: 733
- Type: West End theatre
- Designation: Grade II*
- Production: One Day: The Musical
- Public transit: Charing Cross; Leicester Square; Charing Cross

Construction
- Opened: 24 April 1889; 137 years ago
- Architects: Walter Emden, C. J. Phipps

Website
- nimaxtheatres.com/theatres/garrick-theatre/

The Garrick Theatre is a West End theatre, located in Charing Cross Road, in the City of Westminster. It is named after the stage actor David Garrick. The theatre was built for and owned by the dramatist W. S. Gilbert and originally leased to the actor-manager John Hare. It opened in 1889 with Hare's production of The Profligate, a new play by Arthur Wing Pinero; another Pinero play, The Notorious Mrs. Ebbsmith, was an early success, scandalising some audience members.

After Hare retired from management in 1895 another actor-manager, Arthur Bourchier, ran and starred at the Garrick for fifteen years. Bourchier and his wife, Violet Vanbrugh, presented plays by a range of contemporary authors including J. M. Barrie, Anthony Hope, Rutland Barrington, Henry Arthur Jones and Alfred Sutro; they staged and starred in Gilbert's last full-length play The Fairy's Dilemma (1904) and also in The Merchant of Venice (1905) and a stage version of Dostoevsky's Crime and Punishment (1911). After the First World War the theatre's fortunes ebbed. Some well-known performers appeared there including Edith Evans and Tallulah Bankhead, but by the 1930s there was an abortive plan to convert the building into a cinema. A long running success, Love on the Dole (1935–36), restored the profitability of the theatre.

During and after the Second World War the house became associated with another actor-manager, Jack Buchanan, who took over the management in 1944 and appeared in several productions. Farce played an important part in the theatre's life during these years, with pieces by Vernon Sylvaine starring Robertson Hare and Alfred Drayton. Revues in the period featured Beatrice Lillie and Dora Bryan and a particularly long-running show called La Plume de ma Tante ran for 750 performances in 1955–56.

In the 1960s, the farceur Brian Rix made the Garrick his London base and presented several long-running productions there. The theatre survived the threat of demolition to make way for a proposed development in Covent Garden, and in the 1970s stars appearing there included Alastair Sim and Patricia Routledge in a 1973 revival of Pinero's comedy Dandy Dick. The comedy No Sex Please, We're British transferred from the Strand Theatre and played at the Garrick from 1982 until 1986. As well as new plays the theatre staged revivals of plays by Bernard Shaw, Noël Coward and J. B. Priestley. Its presentations have varied from comedies and musicals to gay dramas including Bent to stand-up comedy from Frankie Howerd, to drag queens impersonating nuns. The theatre continues to present plays and musicals in the 21st century.

== History ==
=== 1889 to 1900 ===
W. S. Gilbert, left, and John Hare

The idea for a West End theatre at the end of Charing Cross Road, where it enters St Martin's Place, originated with the dramatist W. S. Gilbert. It was the second London theatre and the first in the West End named after the eighteenth-century actor David Garrick. (Note: There had been a Garrick Theatre in the East End between the 1830s and 1880s. Its capacity was 600.) Gilbert financed the building of the theatre for the actor-manager John Hare, on a plot of ground for which Gilbert obtained a long lease. The theatre was designed by Walter Emden and C. J. Phipps. When the building was under way it was feared that the work might have to be abandoned. As the theatre was to be built partially below ground (the back of the dress circle was at street level) deep excavations were required and water was discovered. This proved to be an old river known to the Romans which flowed underneath the site. Gilbert commented humorously that he was in grave doubt whether to keep on building or to let the fishing rights. Building costs far exceeded the original estimates and Gilbert had borrowed £15,000. This affected the rent to be charged to Hare as tenant, which was set at a little over £4,000 a year. Hare protested mildly, and Gilbert responded, "You must see that investing £44,000 in the Garrick Theatre is not quite the same thing as investing it in Consols". He said it was "a most risky & utterly inconvertible form of security" and he had made the investment to save Hare "from falling into the hands of City harpies who would have made you bleed to the tune of 10%". Hare replied that although he knew Gilbert acted out of friendship, it was only business-like to have protested.

The opening production: Pinero's The Profligate

Eventually the engineering problems were overcome and the new theatre opened on 24 April 1889, with Arthur Wing Pinero's The Profligate. As well as Hare the cast included Johnston Forbes-Robertson and Lewis Waller. Gilbert was not present at the first night, being on a Mediterranean cruise for the good of his health. His collaborator in the Savoy Operas, Sir Arthur Sullivan, was there: he had composed an incidental song for the piece and played the piano accompaniment from the wings. "Very brilliant success", he recorded. The Era reported that the house was "filled from the front row of the stalls to the top-most seat in the gallery, the higher priced parts of the house being occupied by a distinguished assembly that included representatives of art, science, literature, and fashion". The Stage for 26 April said:

The style of Mr Hare's new theatre is classic. The whole of the Charing Cross Road front is executed in Portland Stone and Bath Stone and has a long frontage of 140 feet. The theatre is entered on the dress circle level, which is reached after passing through the outer vestibule by a large inner vestibule. A striking object in this is a handsome oil painting copy of the celebrated portrait of Garrick. … The floor of the vestibule is laid with mosaic and that of the entrance hall and saloons in marquetry, and they are surrounded by dados of polished walnut in panels, the upper part of the walls being divided by marble pilasters, the panels thus formed being filled with mirrors and decorations in relief. The ceilings are of a highly ornamental character, the whole of these decorations being in the Italian Renaissance style".

The Era stated on 27 April:

The house consists of four tiers, pit, stalls, dress circle, upper circle and gallery, and will hold about 1500 persons. (Note: The seating capacity of 1,500 was reported in The Stage as well as The Era, but other newspapers reporting on the opening of the theatre recorded a capacity of 1,200. The theatre historians Mander and Mitchenson find the lower figure more credible.) The auditorium is decorated in Italian Renaissance style, the ornamental work being in high bold relief. The proscenium opening is formed by groups of columns on either side of the first proscenium box, the general form of the theatre being after that of Covent Garden, with four openings forming a square, supporting in their centre a circular dome. The box front of the dress circle tier is divided by groups of cupids supporting shields crowned with laurels, each shield bearing the name of a celebrated author.

The Profligate was a success and ran for 129 performances. According to the theatre historians Mander and Mitchenson, "This play was a landmark in theatrical history, as it threw emphasis on the playwright rather than on the actors and heralded a new tendency for the author to have more importance than the players". The Profligate was followed by La Tosca (1889), an English version of Victorien Sardou's play, later familiar in Puccini's operatic setting, and then Sydney Grundy's A Pair of Spectacles (1890), Pinero's Lady Bountiful (1891), and a revival of Grundy's A Fool's Paradise (1892). After a starrily cast revival of Diplomacy, Hare presented Pinero's The Notorious Mrs Ebbsmith in 1895, which shocked sections of the audience by featuring a heroine with what were then seen as loose morals. Hare retired from the management of the Garrick in 1895 and after seasons under E. S. Willard and the Kendals the house became a venue for comic opera and musical comedies under the management of H. T. Brickwell, and for visits from overseas companies.

=== 1900 to 1939 ===
The Fairy's Dilemma, 1904: from left O. B. Clarence, Sydney Valentine, Arthur Bourchier and Violet Vanbrugh

The next important phase of the history of the Garrick came in 1900, when Arthur Bourchier and his wife Violet Vanbrugh took over. Their regime lasted for more than a decade and included productions of J. M. Barrie's The Wedding Guest (1900), Pinero's Iris (1901), Anthony Hope's Pilkerton's Peerage, The Bishop's Move (1902), Water Babies, an adaptation by Rutland Barrington of Charles Kingsley's novel, with music by Alfred Cellier and others (1902 and 1903), Henry Arthur Jones's Whitewashing Julia (1903) and Gilbert's The Fairy's Dilemma (1904). The last was Gilbert's only original work for the Garrick; he tried unsuccessfully to interest Bourchier in a revival of his 1887 opera with Sullivan, Ruddigore.

Later productions under Bourchier included Jones's The Chevaleer, Alfred Sutro's The Walls of Jericho (both 1904), The Merchant of Venice (1905) and a stage version of Dostoevsky's Crime and Punishment (1911). Gilbert died in 1911 and his widow inherited the lease of the Garrick's site. (Note: After her death in 1936 the lease passed to the Gilberts' unofficially adopted daughter Nancy McIntosh; when she died in 1954 it passed to the Royal General Theatrical Fund.) Oscar Asche and Lily Brayton had a season during which Edward Knoblock's Kismet ran for 328 performances. Mander and Mitchenson record that after Bourchier left in 1915, managements changed frequently and presented shows that failed to run very long (even under Charles B. Cochran, 1918–1924). The Ghost Train by Arnold Ridley successfully transferred to the theatre in 1926; in 1928 the Moscow Art Theatre company visited with a short season of plays by Chekhov and others; in 1929 Edith Evans starred in and as The Lady With the Lamp; in 1930 Tallulah Bankhead played Marguerite in The Lady of the Camellias.

Plans were announced for rebuilding the Garrick as a super-cinema: an architect was named and the work was said to be starting shortly, but the scheme never materialised. Afterwards, the Garrick had a major success with Love on the Dole, an adaptation of a novel by Walter Greenwood about working-class poverty in 1930s Northern England. It made a star of Wendy Hiller and ran for 391 performances. Sarah Simple by A. A. Milne was produced in 1937 and in 1939 Maurice Schwartz and his Yiddish Art Theatre of New York gave a season.

=== Second World War to 1970 ===
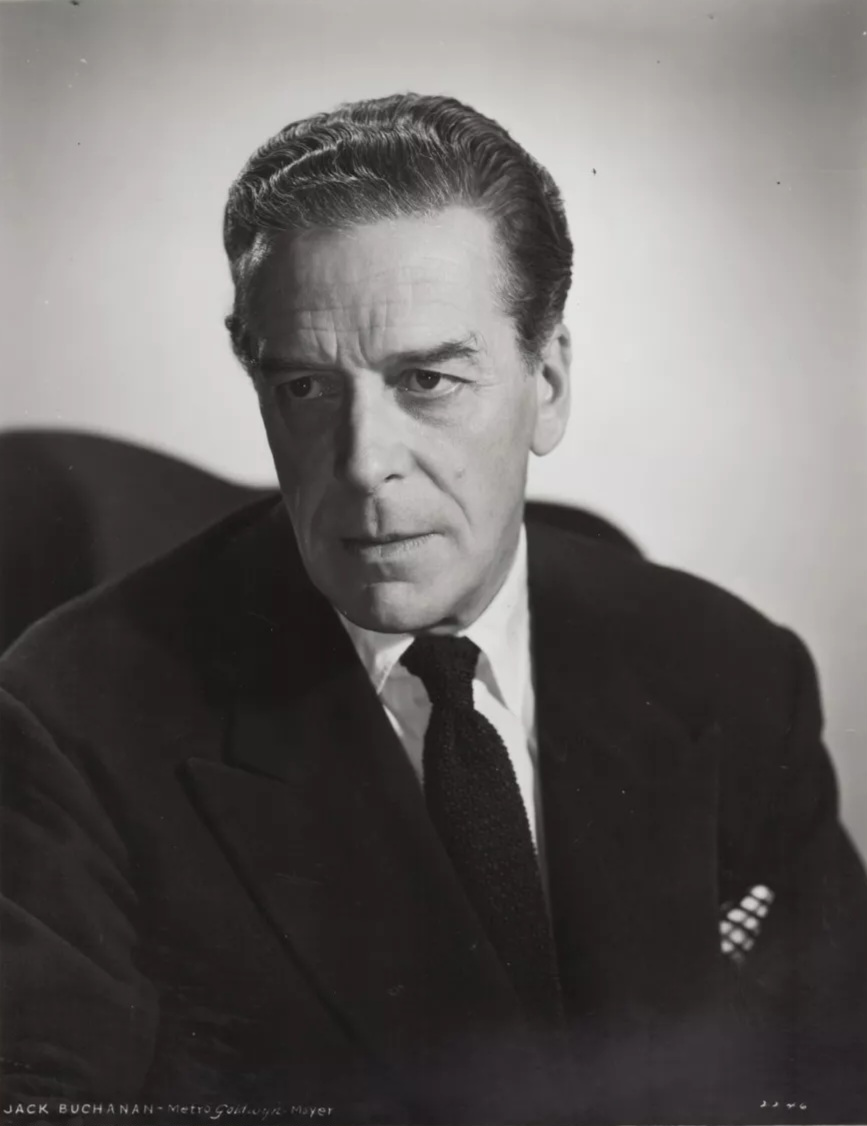
Jack Buchanan in the 1940s

The Garrick was closed for two years after the outbreak of the Second World War after a plan to turn it into a Forces Theatre failed. The theatre reopened in September 1941 and housed many different productions including farces, comedies and drama. Jack Buchanan took over the direction of the theatre in 1944 – first jointly with Bernard Delfont and later as sole tenant – and retained it until his death in 1957. In 1946 Beatrice Lillie starred in a revue, Better Late and in 1947 Laurence Olivier directed Born Yesterday, which introduced Yolande Donlan to London. Buchanan appeared with Coral Browne in a revival of Canaries Sometimes Sing later in the year. A farce by Vernon Sylvaine, One Wild Oat, starred Robertson Hare and Alfred Drayton. The next big success was To Dorothy, a Son, starring Donlan and Richard Attenborough, transferring from the Savoy Theatre and running at the two houses for a total of 514 performances in 1951–52

Buchanan returned in As Long as They're Happy in 1953. Mander and Mitchenson list as the theatre's other successes of the 1950s, Serious Charge (1955), the revue La Plume de ma Tante, which ran for 750 performances from November 1955; followed by Living for Pleasure, a revue with Dora Bryan (1958), and Farewell, Farewell, Eugene (1959) with Margaret Rutherford and Peggy Mount. The Theatre Workshop's production of Fings Ain't Wot They Used T' Be transferred from the Theatre Royal, Stratford in February 1960 and ran at the Garrick for two years, a total of 897 performances. Charles Dyer's Rattle of a Simple Man ran for 377 performances from September 1962, starring Sheila Hancock and Edward Woodward. Two further successes were Difference of Opinion (489 performances from November 1963) and Who's Afraid of Virginia Woolf? transferring from the Globe Theatre in January 1965 with a new cast led by Constance Cummings and Ray McAnally, for a total run of 428 performances.

The theatre was closed from 20 June 1965 to 20 April 1966 for redecoration, and re-opened with a revival of Ben Travers's farce Thark, but despite a cast headed by Alec McCowen, Peter Cushing and Kathleen Harrison and direction by Ray Cooney it had only 86 performances. The Stage called it "a mediocre production with several of the parts either miscast or else extremely badly played". This was followed by a revival of Bernard Shaw's Too True to be Good transferring from the Strand to finish a run of 138 performances. More transfers and revivals followed: Man and Superman, starring Alan Badel and Siân Phillips (232 performances, 1966), An Ideal Husband, starring Raymond Huntley, Joyce Carey and Richard Todd, and Volpone, starring Leo McKern. After this, "The Theatre of Laughter" – a season of Brian Rix farces in repertoire: Stand by Your Bedouin, Uproar in the House and Let Sleeping Wives Lie ran into 1969. Roy Hudd and Rita Tushingham appeared in The Giveaway, followed by She Stoops to Conquer with Tom Courtenay.

A proposed redevelopment of Covent Garden by the Greater London Council in 1968 saw the theatre under threat, together with the nearby Vaudeville, Adelphi, Lyceum, and Duchess Theatres. A campaign by Equity, the Musicians' Union, and theatre owners under the auspices of the Save London Theatres Campaign led to the abandonment of the scheme.

=== 1970 to 1999 ===
In the 1970s another farce starring Rix and his company opened at the Garrick; the cast of Don't Just Lie There. Say Something also included Alfred Marks, Leo Franklyn and Joanna Lumley. It ran from September 1971 to March 1973. The following year Anthony Shaffer's Sleuth transferred from St Martin's Theatre. Alastair Sim and Patricia Routledge starred in a 1973 revival of Pinero's comedy Dandy Dick. The Stage called it "an evening of unflagging enjoyment. Alastair Sim is masterly ... rolling his eyes with increasing panic as his indiscretions lead him towards disaster ... As his loud, back-slapping sister Georgiana, whose every phrase is a horse-racing metaphor, Patricia Routledge is the perfect foil". Aspects of Max Wall ran for a six-week sell-out season in 1975. Richard Beckinsale starred in a risqué comedy, Funny Peculiar, in 1976–77. In 1977 Side By Side By Sondheim transferred and was a continuing success with its new cast – David Firth, Maggie Fitzgibbon, Robin Ray and Gay Soper. Ira Levin's thriller Deathtrap ran from 1978 to 1981.

In the 1980s the comedy No Sex Please, We're British transferred from the Strand Theatre and remained from 1982 until 1986, in which year the Garrick was acquired by Stoll Moss Theatres and refurbished. It reopened in November with Judi Dench and Michael Williams in Mr and Mrs Nobody. William Gaunt and Susie Blake starred in When Did You Last See Your Trousers? by Ray Galton and John Antrobus in 1987. A production of Noël Coward's Easy Virtue transferred to the Garrick from the King's Head Theatre with Jane How, Zena Walker and Ronnie Stevens in 1988. The theatre had another Coward success with Rupert Everett and Maria Aitken in The Vortex after which Timberlake Wertenbaker's Our Country's Good transferred from the Royal Court Theatre.

During 1990 a short season of Bent with Ian McKellen and Michael Cashman was followed by Frankie Howerd in a one-man show, and then Fences with Yaphet Kotto and a transfer from the Almeida Theatre, Islington of The Rehearsal by Jean Anouilh. The following year Brian Friel's Dancing at Lughnasa transferred from the Phoenix Theatre. The shows of 1993 were John Godber's On the Piste and Steven Berkoff's One Man. In 1994, after Tom Courtenay in Moscow Stations there was a festive season with the group Fascinating Aida.

Among the productions of 1995 were Paul Merton and Caroline Quentin in The Live Bed Show, the Abbey Theatre production of Sean O'Casey's The Plough and the Stars and Clarke Peters in Unforgettable: The Nat King Cole Story. These were followed by the transfer of the National Theatre's production of J. B. Priestley's An Inspector Calls, which ran from November 1995 to December 1999.

=== 21st century ===
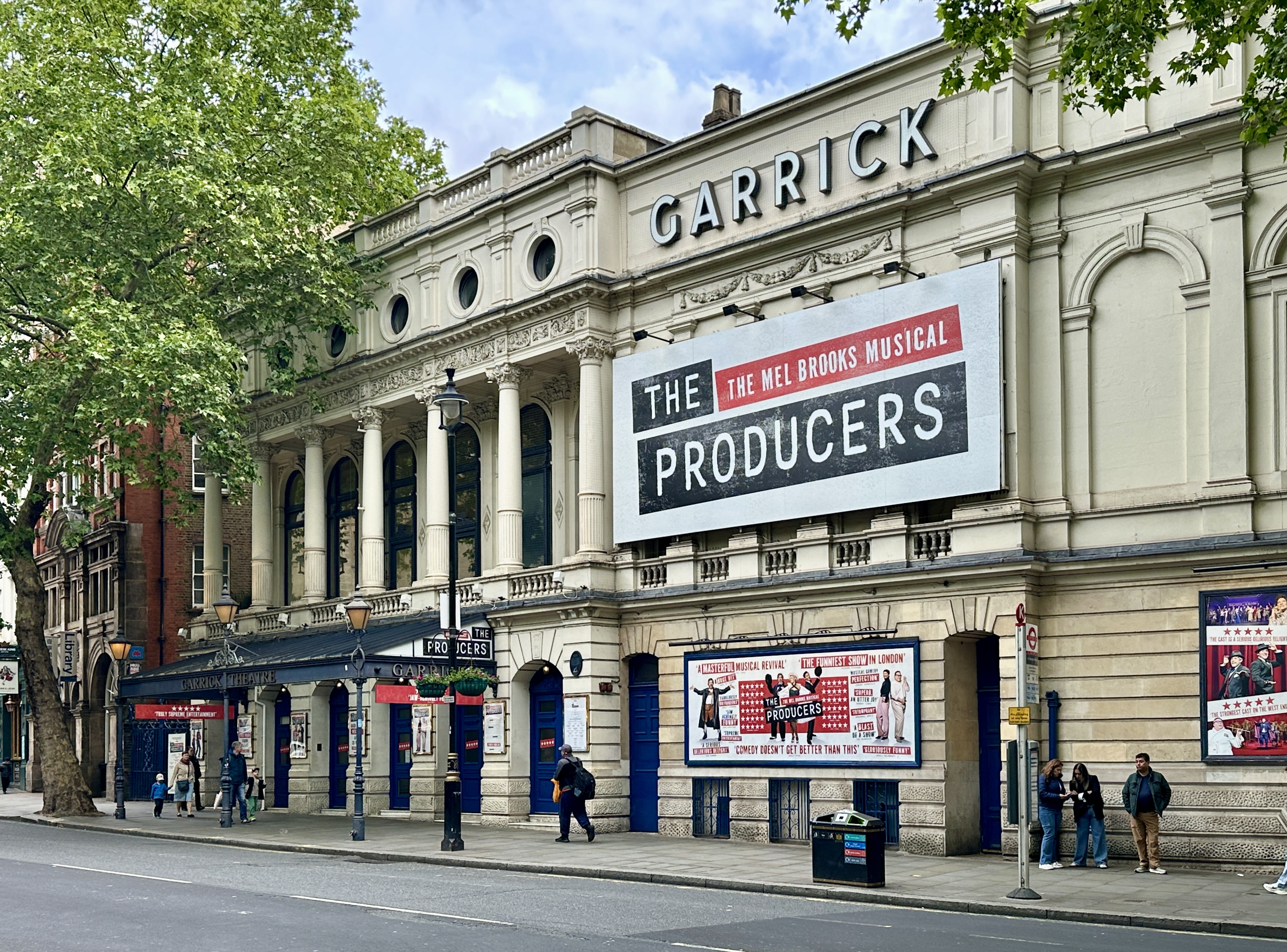
Garrick Theatre in 2026

In 2000 The Garrick became a Really Useful Theatre when Andrew Lloyd-Webber's Really Useful Group and Bridgepoint Capital bought Stoll Moss Theatres Ltd. The following year Feelgood transferred from Hampstead Theatre, followed by J B Priestley's Dangerous Corner. In 2002 the first British production of the musical This Is Our Youth played two seasons on each side of a run of The Lieutenant of Inishmore. There were several short seasons in 2003, and in 2004 a revival of David Mamet's Oleanna was followed by The Solid Gold Cadillac starring Patricia Routledge and Roy Hudd. The producers Nica Burns and Max Weitzenhoffer purchased the Garrick Theatre, along with the Apollo, Duchess and Lyric theatres, creating Nimax Theatres in September 2005. Productions in the second half of the decade included The Anniversary starring Sheila Hancock (2005), Shaw's You Never Can Tell (2006), One Flew Over the Cuckoo's Nest, Absurd Person Singular (2007) and A Little Night Music (2009).

In 2010 a revival of Priestley's comedy When We Are Married starred Maureen Lipman and Roy Hudd. In 2011 the musical Chicago transferred from the Cambridge Theatre and closed in 2012 after 15 years in the West End. It was succeeded by the Chichester Festival production of Shaw's Pygmalion, with Rupert Everett as Higgins and Kara Tointon as Eliza. In 2013 Twelve Angry Men opened, with a cast that included Martin Shaw, Jeff Fahey, Nick Moran and Robert Vaughn. Let It Be transferred from the Savoy and played briefly in 2014 and through most of 2015. Griff Rhys Jones, Lee Mack and Ryan Gage starred in Molière's The Miser in 2017.

Death Drop in 2020 was billed as "A Dragatha Christie Murder Mystery" and featured a cast of drag queens as nuns. After closing because of the COVID-19 pandemic the show reopened in May 2021. Later that year The Drifters Girl, another musical, starred Beverley Knight This was followed by a revival of Mel Brooks's Young Frankenstein, with a cast including Hadley Fraser, Ross Noble, Lesley Joseph and Summer Strallen. The two productions of 2022 were My Son's a Queer (But What Can You Do?) written and performed by Rob Madge, and Orlando by Virginia Woolf, adapted by Neil Bartlett, starring Emma Corrin, which ran for a limited season from November to the following February. 2023 saw Bonnie & Clyde by Frank Wildhorn, Don Black and Ivan Menchell, followed by the Royal Shakespeare Company's production Hamnet, based on Maggie O'Farrell's novel, adapted for the theatre by Lolita Chakrabarti, running until February 2024. Shaw's Mrs Warren's Profession was revived at the Garrick in 2025, starring Imelda Staunton and her daughter Bessie Carter. It was followed by a revival of Mel Brooks's musical The Producers.

== Capacity ==
The capacity of the theatre has been considerably reduced over the years. When new, its seating capacity was variously reported as 1,500 and 1,200. The 1914, 1922 and 1947 editions of Who's Who in the Theatre record a seating capacity of 1,250. In the years after the Second World War the pit (Note: The pit was an area of cheap, unreserved seating (often benches, although the pit seats in the Garrick were individual and padded) behind the stalls. In the Garrick, stalls cost 10/6 (52p), pit seats 2/6 (12p) and the gallery 1s (5p). Pits were a common feature of Victorian theatres, but were generally done away with in the twentieth century.) was replaced by rear stalls seats, and the gallery considerably reduced in size by partitions, lessening the capacity of the theatre. By the time of the 1961 edition of Who's Who in the Theatre the capacity had been reduced to "approximately 800". The current (2026) seating capacity is 733, consisting of 473 stalls, 136 dress circle and 124 grand circle.

== Notes, references and sources ==
=== Sources ===
- Ainger, Michael (2002). Gilbert and Sullivan – A Dual Biography. Oxford: Oxford University Press. ISBN 978-0-19-514769-8.
- Banham, Martin, ed. (1992). The Cambridge Theatre Guide. Cambridge and New York: Cambridge University Press. ISBN 0-52-142903-X.
- Gaye, Freda, ed. (1961). Who's Who in the Theatre (thirteenth ed.). London: Sir Isaac Pitman and Sons. OCLC 3039406.
- Gaye, Freda, ed. (1967). Who's Who in the Theatre (fourteenth ed.). London: Sir Isaac Pitman and Sons. OCLC 5997224.
- Mander, Raymond; Joe Mitchenson (1975). The Theatres of London (second ed.). London: New English Library. ISBN 0-45-002123-8.
- Marshall, Michael (1978). Top Hat & Tails: The Story of Jack Buchanan. London: Elm Tree Books. ISBN 0-24-189602-9.
- Stedman, Jane W. (1996). W. S. Gilbert, A Classic Victorian & His Theatre. Oxford: Oxford University Press. ISBN 978-0-19-816174-5.
