= Violet Vanbrugh =

English actress (1867–1942)

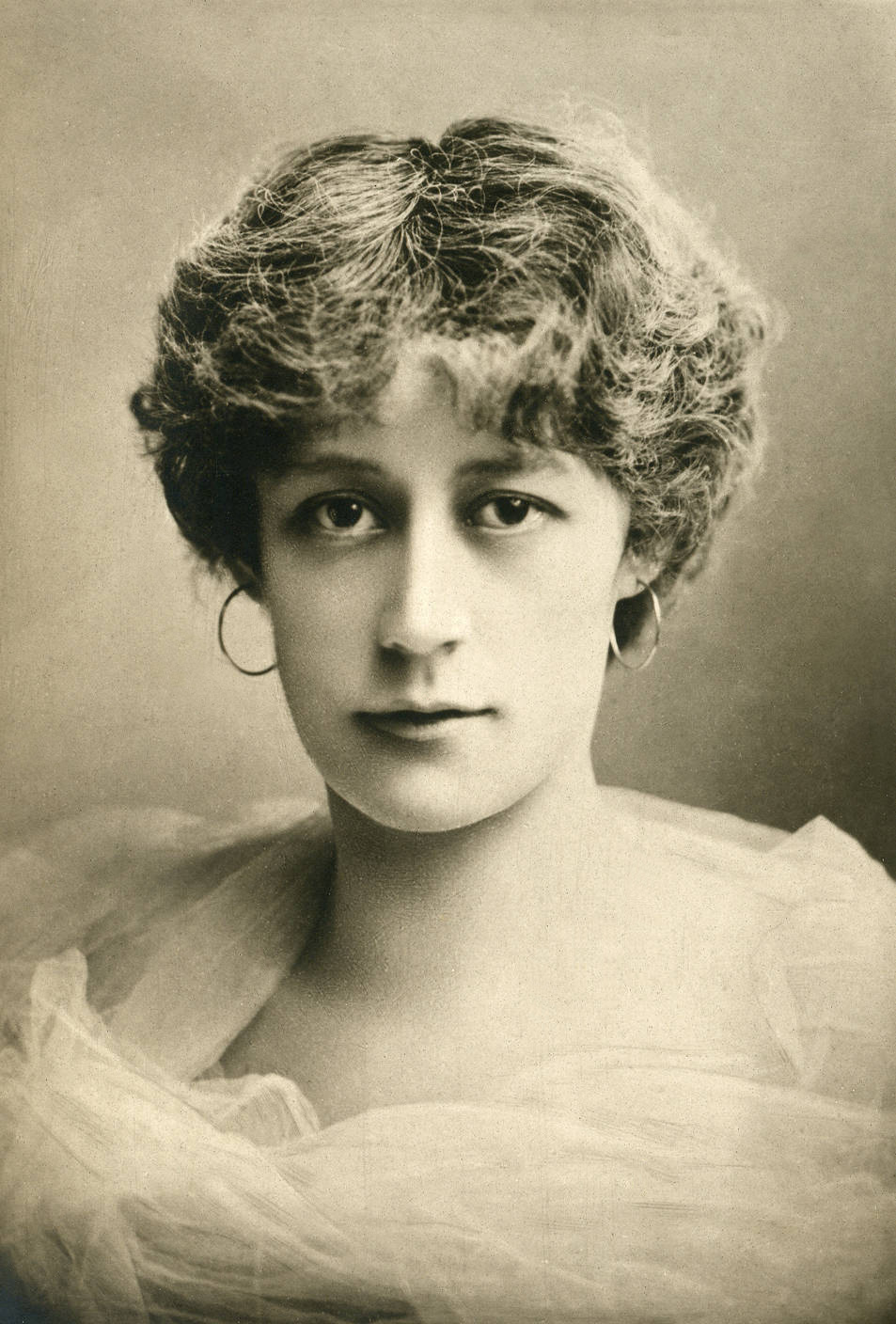
Violet Vanbrugh in 1907

Violet Augusta Mary Bourchier, née Barnes (11 June 1867 – 11 November 1942), known professionally as Violet Vanbrugh, was an English actress with a career that spanned more than fifty years.

Vanbrugh was from a family with theatrical connections. The actress Irene Vanbrugh was one of her younger sisters and a brother, Kenneth Barnes, became principal of the Royal Academy of Dramatic Art.

She made her professional debut in an 1886 burlesque. In the same year she had her first West End speaking role and then joined a repertory company in Margate playing leading roles in four of Shakespeare's plays among others. She next played in J. L. Toole's company for two years. In 1889 she joined the Kendals at the Court Theatre and on tour in the US. Two years later, back in London, she joined Henry Irving and Ellen Terry in their Shakespeare company at the Lyceum Theatre. In 1893, she appeared opposite her future husband Arthur Bourchier at Daly's Theatre and soon became his leading lady at the Royalty Theatre and later at the Garrick Theatre, where Bourchier was lessee for the first six years of the 20th century.

Vanbrugh returned to Shakespearean roles in 1906 at Stratford upon Avon, where she played Lady Macbeth to her husband's Macbeth, and in 1910 they starred together in Herbert Beerbohm Tree's London production of Henry VIII. They divorced in 1917, after which Vanbrugh continued acting on stage until 1937 (making some further appearances until 1940) and appeared in films in the 1930s. In her fiftieth season on stage she starred in The Merry Wives of Windsor with her sister in London, and during the Blitz, the two entertained at matinees. She died at her home in London in 1942 at the age of 75.

== Life and career ==
=== Early years ===
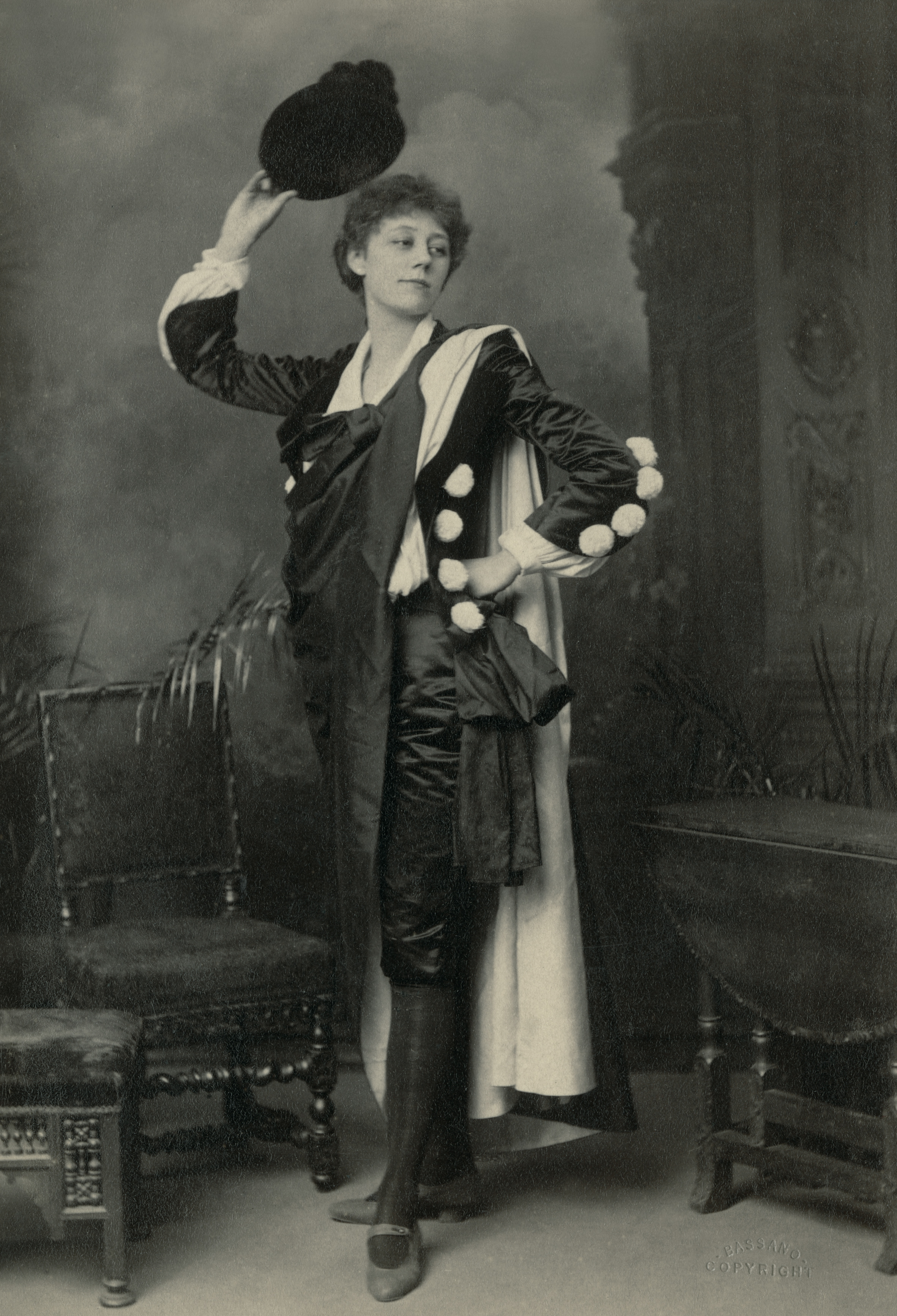
Vanbrugh c. 1889, perhaps as Kitty Maitland in The Don (Note: The photo is inscribed on the back "Kitty from Violet".)

Vanbrugh was born in Exeter, in south-west England, on 11 June 1867, the eldest of six children of the Rev Reginald Henry Barnes, Prebendary of Exeter Cathedral and Vicar of Heavitree, and his wife, Frances Mary Emily, née Nation. Her mother was an amateur actress, praised by the stage star Ellen Terry, and there were other theatrical antecedents on the maternal side: W. H. C. Nation, who managed theatres in London, was Violet's uncle and her great-grandfather introduced Edmund Kean to the London stage. Two of her siblings later pursued theatrical careers – the actress Irene Vanbrugh and the principal of the Royal Academy of Dramatic Art, Kenneth Barnes. She was educated in Exeter, France and Germany.

Although her father was at first dismayed by her wish to go on the stage, he eventually gave his consent. She moved to London with £50 (equivalent to £5,372 in 2025), a small legacy she had received, but after three months the money was running out and she had failed to find a theatrical engagement. She was helped by Ellen Terry, a family friend, who invited her to stay at her Chelsea house, and introduced her to the actor-manager J. L. Toole. He gave Violet her first chance, at his theatre in the West End, in February 1886 in F. C. Burnand's burlesque Faust and Loose as one of what Terry called "an absurd chorus … dressed in tight black satin coats, who besides dancing and singing had lines in unison, such as 'No, no!' 'We will!'" At Terry's suggestion, Violet took the stage name of Vanbrugh. (Note: In her memoirs, Irene Vanbrugh wrote, "It was the fashion then to have your two initials the same and Ellen Terry … happened to come across a novel called Miss Vanbrugh the Actress. She laughingly suggested to Vi that she should call herself Violet Vanbrugh.)

=== Early career ===
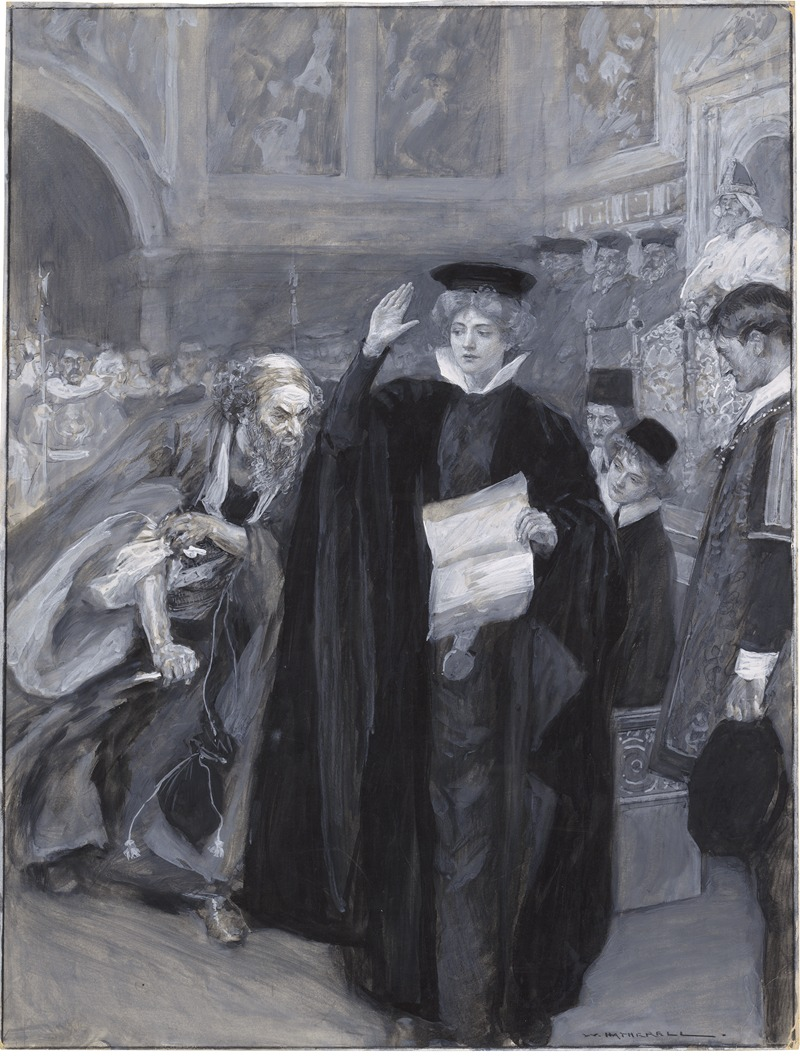
As Portia in The Merchant of Venice, painted by William Hatherell

Irene Vanbrugh later credited her elder sister with making both their acting careers possible: "Violet, with both hands outstretched, made the opening wide enough to get through herself and when my time came the door was still ajar." Violet's first speaking role was Ellen, in The Little Pilgrim, a dramatisation of a Ouida story, at the Criterion Theatre.

In 1886 Vanbrugh joined Sarah Thorne's theatre company at the Theatre Royal Margate, which gave her – and later her younger sister – what a biographer describes as "an invaluable training, learning a new part every week". Thorne usually charged a fee to take pupils into her company, but Violet, and then Irene, showed such promise they were accepted free of charge. Violet was playing leading roles by the time Irene arrived at Margate two years after her, in August 1888. Irene recalled, "We played every kind of play there; comedy, farce, and drama of the deepest dye; while at Christmas there came the pantomime so that the Juliet of a week ago might be the Prince Paragon of the Yule-tide extravaganza." For two years Vanbrugh rejoined Toole's company, on tour and in London, playing several roles including Lady Anne in The Butler and Kitty Maitland in The Don, both written by H. C. Merivale and his wife. Returning to Margate in 1888 she appeared in nine roles, including four by Shakespeare: Ophelia (Hamlet), Helena (A Midsummer Night's Dream), Portia (The Merchant of Venice) and Rosalind (As You Like It) with, in the last of these, Irene making her stage début in the role of Phoebe. Sir John Gielgud, a grand-nephew of Ellen Terry, later described the two:

The Vanbrugh sisters were remarkably alike in appearance. Tall and imposing, beautifully spoken, they moved with grace. ... They were elegantly but never ostentatiously dressed, entering and leaving the stage with unerring authority. ... Violet never struck me as a natural comedienne, as Irene was.

At the Criterion in December 1888 Vanbrugh played Gertrude in the Deputy Registrar, a farce by Ralph Lumley and Horace Sedger. The play had a mixed reception but the theatrical paper The Era found Vanbrugh's performance "graceful and pleasing". The following year she joined W. H. and Madge Kendal at the Court Theatre as Lady Gillingham in The Weaker Sex by A. W. Pinero, and subsequently travelled with them on their first two tours to the US, making her Broadway début in October 1889 as Lady Ingham in John Palgrave Simpson's comedy A Scrap of Paper. In the American tour she played in a variety of other comedies, including Sydney Grundy's A White Lie, and B. C. Stephenson's Impulse, as well as Pinero's drama The Iron Master.

After two years in America Vanbrugh returned to London. She planned to rest, but shortly after her return her career took an unexpected turn when the actor-manager Henry Irving, whom she knew, but not well, saw her sitting in a hansom cab, stopped the cab and offered her on the spot the role of Anne Boleyn in his forthcoming production of King Henry VIII at the Lyceum Theatre. The production, which opened in January 1892, starred Irving as Cardinal Wolsey, Terry as Catherine of Aragon and William Terriss as the King; it ran for more than 200 performances. Vanbrugh also understudied Terry as Cordelia in King Lear and Rosamund in Tennyson's Becket.

=== With Arthur Bourchier ===
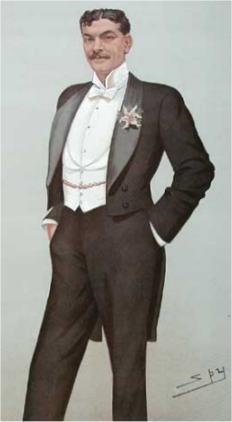
Arthur Bourchier

During 1893 and 1894 Vanbrugh was in Augustin Daly's company at his London theatre where her roles included Lady Sneerwell in The School for Scandal, Alithea in The Country Girl and Olivia in Twelfth Night. In 1893 she appeared at Daly's with Arthur Bourchier in Love in Tandem, a French comedy adapted by Daly. The two were praised in the press, although most attention was given to the star, Ada Rehan. The following year Vanbrugh and Bourchier married. They had a child, Prudence, born in 1902, who also became an actress, taking the stage name Vanbrugh.

In 1895 Bourchier became lessee of the Royalty Theatre, and Vanbrugh became his leading lady in many productions, beginning with The Chili Widow, an adaptation by Bourchier and Alfred Sutro of a French comedy, in which both Vanbrugh sisters had roles and were praised in the press. The Evening Standard said of Violet, "Rarely has Miss Vanbrugh been seen to greater advantage. Her portrait of the Chili widow was distinguished throughout by charm, intelligence and womanliness". Other plays at the Royalty were the comedy Mr Versus Mrs, a gory drama, Monsieur de Paris and a Sardou adaptation, The Queen's Proctor.

Bourchier and Vanbrugh toured America beginning in November 1897, heading a company that included Irene Vanbrugh, Henry Vibart, Helen Rous and Mabel Beardsley. During the tour, Violet was taken ill with nervous exhaustion, and Irene temporarily took over her sister's roles. Bourchier closed the tour early and the company returned to England.

Back in London Vanbrugh played the title role in Teresa, which Bourchier produced at the Metropole. In 1900 she took a break from acting with him to appear at the Court Theatre as the sporty Georgiana Tidman in a revival of Pinero's farce Dandy Dick, directed by the author. This was not among her successes: her notices described her as unsuited to the role and compared her unfavourably with its original player, Mrs John Wood.

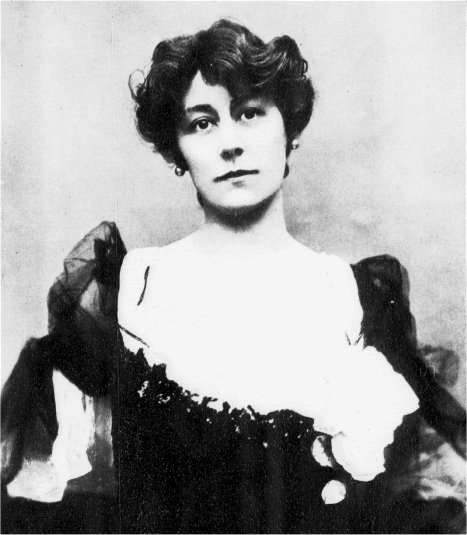
In The Fairy's Dilemma, 1904

After managing several productions with Charles Wyndham, Bourchier became lessee of the Garrick Theatre in September 1900. Over the six years of his management there, Vanbrugh starred in many of his productions, including H. V. Esmond's My Lady Virtue (1902), H. A. Jones's Whitewashing Julia (1903), John Oliver Hobbes's The Bishop's Move (1903), Bernard Miall's, The Arm of the Law (1904), and W. S. Gilbert's The Fairy's Dilemma (1904). None of these had more than moderately successful runs, (Note: In the late 19th and early 20th century a first run of more than 100 performances in London or Paris was counted as successful enough for mention in the theatrical reference books. These five productions ran, respectively, for 63, 107, 69, 78 and 90 performances.) but the Bourchiers had a conspicuous success with the production of Sutro's The Walls of Jericho in 1904. A satire of fashionable bridge-playing society with Bourchier as a rich but down-to-earth sheep farmer and Vanbrugh as his flighty aristocratic wife, it ran for 423 performances.

In 1905 Vanbrugh reprised her role of Portia in Bourchier's production of The Merchant of Venice. Bourchier received high praise for his portrayal of Shylock, and The Times described Vanbrugh's Portia as "Tremulously tender in the love scenes at Belmont, quietly dignified in the trial scene, arch and irrepressibly happy at the last, it is as engaging a Portia as one could wish to see". The company repeated the production in a command performance for Edward VII at Windsor Castle. In 1906, at Stratford-upon-Avon, and later at the Garrick, she played Lady Macbeth to her husband's Macbeth.The Stage praised Vanbrugh's performance:

Miss Violet Vanbrugh's rich, musical voice, her tall figure, her perfect enunciation, and her tragic capacity made the character one of much effect … the house was thrilled by the acting. … Miss Vanbrugh received quite an ovation on the final fall of the curtain.

At Stratford in 1910 she played Beatrice in Much Ado About Nothing; it had been planned that Bourchier would play Benedick, but he was detained in London and Robert Loraine took the part. Later in 1910 Vanbrugh and Bourchier were engaged by Herbert Beerbohm Tree to appear with him in a lavish production of Henry VIII at His Majesty's Theatre, London. Bourchier was in the title role, Vanbrugh played Queen Catherine and Tree played Wolsey. They appeared in a silent film of the production, which played to packed houses in early 1911.

From 1915 the Bourchiers' marriage became dysfunctional. Their colleague Robert Speaight later commented that Bourchier "treated her very much as Henry VIII treated Anne Boleyn – except he didn't quite cut off her head". In 1917 Vanbrugh divorced Bourchier for desertion and adultery. In 1918 he married an actress twenty-four years his junior, Violet Marion Kyrle Bellew; Vanbrugh never remarried.

=== Later years ===
As Lady Carfax in The Knave of Diamonds, 1921

After her divorce, Vanbrugh continued her stage career for nearly two decades. In the West End and on tour she was seen in a succession of new plays, none of which have become familiar repertory pieces. Her roles in the 1920s included Lady Tonbridge in The Young Person in Pink (1920), Lady Carfax in The Knave of Diamonds (1921), Esmee Farr in The Laughing Lady (1922) Cleo d'Aubigny in The Flame (1923 and 1924), Edith Ogilvy in The Letter of the Law (1924), the Dowager Duchess of Clevedon in The Duchess Decides (1926), Claire Forster in The Woman in the Case (1926), Mrs Vexted in Thunder in the Air (1928) and the Duchess of Dunborough in Her Past (1929).

During the 1930s Vanbrugh's stage roles included Lady Edward Tantamount in This Way to Paradise (1930), Mary Howard in The Silent Witness (1930), Beatrice Murdock in A Pair of Trousers (1930), Mrs Thomas in After All (1931), Princess Stephanie in Evensong (1932), Lady Lydia Bassinger in Who's Who? (1934), Lady Madehurst in Family Affairs (1935) and Countess von Korompa in Muted Strings (1936). In between these commercial plays she appeared at the Hippodrome, Manchester in May 1934 as Mistress Ford in The Merry Wives of Windsor with her sister as Mistress Page, Wilfred Walter as Falstaff and the young Jessica Tandy as Anne Page. The Stage described the casting of the sisters as "an inspiration … Their roguish merriment in the Clothes basket scene and the subsequent torturings of Falstaff quite infected the first night audience".

During the 1930s Vanbrugh made occasional returns to the film studios, in Captivation (1931), Joy Ride (1935), and the 1938 adaptation of Shaw's Pygmalion.

In her fiftieth season on stage, Vanbrugh again starred with her sister as the Merry Wives, at the Ring, Blackfriars, and the Open Air Theatre, Regent's Park. The Stage said, "The most exciting feature of the evening was of course the appearance of Irene and Violet Vanbrugh as the Merry Wives … they fairly carried all before them, and gave a brilliant display of the art of comic acting". During the Battle of Britain, the Vanbrugh sisters carried out what a biographer calls "a characteristic piece of war work" by giving, with Donald Wolfit, lunchtime performances of extracts from The Merry Wives of Windsor at the Strand Theatre. These were Violet's last stage appearances.

Violet Vanbrugh died in her sleep at her home in London on 11 November 1942 at the age of 75. She was buried at Heavitree on 14 November, and a memorial service was held at St Martin-in-the-Fields on 19 November. The obituarist in The Times wrote of her:

Violet Vanbrugh brought to all the varied parts she played a grace that was all her own and yet was recognizably part of a distinguished family inheritance. ... Her tragedy queens never failed of nobility and command. Her melodrama had style. But she could also win dramatic victories by persuasion, and when she turned from tragedy to comedy revealed a radiant humour which consorted well with her natural dignity.

== Notes, references and sources ==
=== Sources ===
- Esteban, Manuel (1983). Georges Feydeau. Boston: Twain. ISBN 978-0-8057-6551-9.
- Gielgud, John (1979). An Actor and His Time. London: Sidgwick and Jackson. ISBN 0-283-98573-9.
- Johns, Eric (1974). Dames of the Theatre. London: W. H. Allen. ISBN 0-49-101591-7.
- Parker, John, ed. (1922). Who's Who in the Theatre (fourth ed.). London: Sir Isaac Pitman and Sons. OCLC 473894893.
- Parker, John, ed. (1939). Who's Who in the Theatre (ninth ed.). London: Sir Isaac Pitman and Sons. OCLC 473894893.
- Terry, Ellen (1908). The Story of My Life. London: Hutchinson and Co. OCLC 162313016.
- Vanbrugh, Irene (1948). To Tell My Story. London: Hutchinson and Co. OCLC 1841262.
- Wearing, J. P. (1976). The London Stage, 1890–1899: A Calendar of Plays and Players. Metuchen: Scarecrow Press. ISBN 0-81-080910-9.
- Wearing, J. P. (1981). The London Stage, 1900–1909: A Calendar of Plays and Players. Metuchen: Scarecrow Press. ISBN 0-81-081403-X.
- Wearing, J. P. (2014). The London Stage 1920–1929: A Calendar of Productions, Performers, and Personnel. Lanham: Rowman & Littlefield. ISBN 978-0-81-089302-3.
