= Alfred Sutro =

British playwright (1863–1933)

Sutro in later years

Alfred Sutro OBE (7 August 1863 – 11 September 1933) was an English dramatist, writer and translator. In addition to a succession of successful plays of his own in the first quarter of the 20th century, Sutro made the first English translations of works by the Belgian writer Maurice Maeterlinck.

== Life and career ==
Sutro was born in London, the third and youngest son of Sigismund Sutro, a medical practitioner and authority on continental spas and their cures. Sutro senior, who was of German and Spanish Sephardic ancestry, had come to England from Germany as a young man and become a British subject. Alfred's grandfather was a rabbi.

Sutro was educated at the City of London School and in Brussels. He worked as a clerk in the City and when he was twenty he entered into partnership with his elder brother Leopold, trading as wholesale merchants. In 1894 he married Esther Stella, daughter of Joseph Michael Isaacs, a fruit broker and importer in Covent Garden; her brother, Rufus Isaacs, became a prominent lawyer and politician. Stella Isaacs was a painter, and insisted that Sutro should give up business and earn his living in the arts.

The Sutros lived for a time in Paris; among the friends they made there was Maurice Maeterlinck, with whom Sutro established a lifelong friendship. Sutro undertook to translate Maeterlinck's works into English, and it was his versions of The Treasure of the Humble (1897), Wisdom and Destiny (1898) and The Life of the Bee (1901) that introduced Maeterlinck to anglophone readers. Sutro's other Maeterlinck translations, some made jointly with his friend Alexander Teixeira de Mattos, include Aglavaine and Selysette, Joyzelle, The Life of the White Ant, The Buried Temple, Monna Vanna, The Death of Tintagiles, and The Magic of the Stars.

Sutro's own work was chiefly as a playwright. After many false starts he achieved a moderate success in 1895 with The Chili Widow, an adaptation of a French work, made jointly with Arthur Bourchier. His first great success was not for a further nine years, when his mildly satirical comedy The Walls of Jericho was presented at the Garrick Theatre, with Bourchier in the lead. A. B. Walkley in The Times was not greatly impressed by the play but correctly predicted a long run. It ran for 423 performances, and established Sutro among the leading English dramatists.

From then until his retirement, Sutro wrote more than twenty plays, most of them popular successes. The Times singled out for mention

- Mollentrave on Women (1905),
- The Perfect Lover (1905),
- The Fascinating Mr Vanderveldt (1906),
- John Glayde’s Honour (1907),
- The Barrier (1907),
- The Builder of Bridges (1908),
- Making a Gentleman (1909),
- The Perplexed Husband (1911),
- The Fire-Screen (1912),
- The Two Virtues (1914),
- The Clever Ones (1914),
- The Choice (1919) and
- A Man with a Heart (1925).

Sutro's biographer Katherine Chubbuck writes that in the 1920s "He had been overtaken by a new school of dramatists led by Noël Coward". After the poor reception of his final play, Living Together (1929) he retired from the theatre.

Sutro also published a volume of stories (The Foolish Virgins, 1904), a collection of sketches (About Women, 1931), and a volume of memoirs, (Celebrities and Simple Souls, 1933).

Sutro died after a few days' illness at his home in Witley, Surrey, on 11 September 1933. His widow died the following year. They had no children.
