= Arthur Bourchier =

British actor

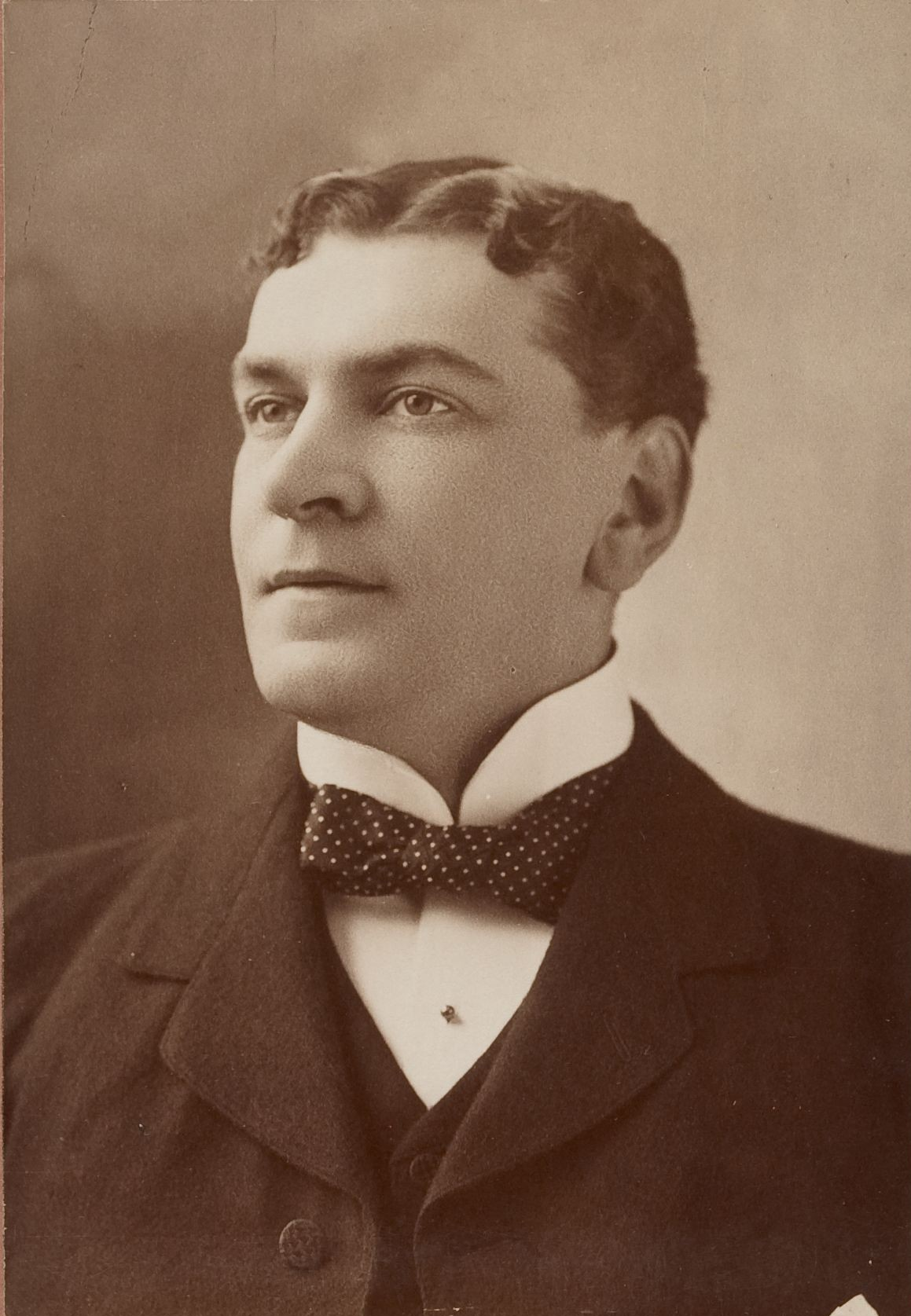
Bourchier in 1896

Arthur Bourchier (22 June 1863 – 14 September 1927) was an English actor and theatre manager. He married and later divorced the actress Violet Vanbrugh.

Bourchier was noted for roles both in classical drama, particularly Shakespeare, and in contemporary plays, including works by W. S. Gilbert, Anthony Hope, Arthur Wing Pinero and Alfred Sutro. He managed several West End theatres during his career, including the Royalty, the Criterion, the Garrick (for a total of eight years), His Majesty's and the Strand.

In his later years Bourchier became active in British politics as a member of the Labour Party.

== Biography ==
Bourchier was born in Speen, Berkshire, England. He was the only son of Fanny (née Farr) and Captain Charles John Bourchier. He was educated at Eton, where he played cricket, and at Oxford University, chiefly at Christ Church. At Oxford he acted with an amateur group called the Philothespian Society, with whom he played Shylock in The Merchant of Venice. With the encouragement of the Vice-Chancellor, Benjamin Jowett, Bourchier founded the Oxford University Dramatic Society (OUDS), which succeeded the Philothespians. With the OUDS, Bourchier played Hotspur, Falstaff, Feste, Thanatos (in Alcestis), and Brutus to the Caesar of H. B. Irving.

=== Early career ===
Bourchier's first professional appearance was with Lillie Langtry in 1889, as Jaques in As You Like It. He also acted with Charles Wyndham at the Criterion Theatre and travelled to America to appear with Augustin Daly's company, for whom he later played the part of Robin Hood in Tennyson's The Foresters at its London premiere. In 1893, he appeared together with Violet Vanbrugh, elder sister of Irene Vanbrugh, in Daly's production of Love in Tandem at Daly's Theatre in London. The two married the following year and had a daughter, Prudence Bourchier (b. 1902), who also became an actress and took the stage name Vanbrugh.

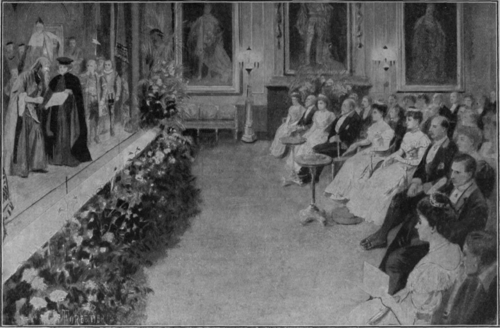
Royal Command Performance, 1905

In 1895, Bourchier became lessee of the Royalty Theatre, and Violet Vanbrugh became his leading lady in many productions, including The Chili Widow (an adaptation of his own, which ran for over 300 nights), Mr and Mrs, Monsieur de Paris and The Queen's Proctor. Bourchier, Vanbrugh and her sister Irene toured America beginning in 1897. Returning to England, Vanbrugh played the title role in Teresa, which he produced at the Metropole.

In partnership with Charles Wyndham in 1900 at the Criterion, Bourchier produced His Excellency the Governor, Lady Huntworth's Experiment, The Noble Lord, and Mamma. He became lessee of the Garrick Theatre in September 1900. Over the six years of his management at the Garrick, he produced many plays, often starring himself and Vanbrugh, including The Bishop's Move, My Lady Virtue, Whitewashing Julia, The Arm of the Law and W. S. Gilbert's The Fairy's Dilemma (1904). Their production of The Walls of Jericho by Alfred Sutro, in 1904, ran for a very successful 423 performances.

Bourchier and Vanbrugh appeared in command performances before King Edward VII in November 1902 in Dr Johnson at Sandringham with Henry Irving's company, and in November 1905 in The Merchant of Venice at Windsor. They toured in 1908 in John Glayde's Honour. In 1910, Bourchier joined Sir Herbert Beerbohm Tree at His Majesty's Theatre and appeared in Shakespearian roles including Bottom in A Midsummer Night's Dream, Brutus in Julius Caesar, Sir Toby Belch in Twelfth Night and Ford to Tree's Falstaff in The Merry Wives of Windsor. He had a notable success as the title character in Henry VIII with Tree as Wolsey and Vanbrugh as Queen Katherine, followed by Tree's silent film of a shortened version of the play in February 1911. In 1913, Bourchier and Vanbrugh produced their own movie in Germany of scenes from Macbeth.

Bourchier as Macbeth, 1910

=== Later years ===
Bourchier returned to manage the Garrick in 1912 for two years. In 1913, he appeared in a revival of London Assurance in aid of King George's Actors' pension fund with other stars including Tree, Henry Ainley, Charles Hawtrey, Weedon Grossmith and Marie Tempest. In 1916 he again played Brutus in Julius Caesar, at the Theatre Royal, Drury Lane, for the Shakespeare tercentenary with Frank Benson as Caesar, H. B. Irving as Cassius and Ainley as Antony. The same year, Bourchier took over management of His Majesty's. In 1917, he created the part of Bruce Bairnsfather's "Old Bill" in a stage adaptation called The Better 'Ole at the Oxford Music Hall, where it ran for over 800 performances.

Bourchier and Vanbrugh continued to play in Shakespeare and other pieces through World War I, but their marriage was becoming difficult. A contemporary later observed, "He treated her very much as Henry VIII treated Anne Boleyn – except he didn't quite cut off her head." They toured together in 1916 but then separated and finally divorced in 1918. Bourchier remarried a much younger actress, Violet Marion Kyrle Bellew in 1918, with whom he continued to appear in contemporary melodramas. Bourchier managed the Strand Theatre from 1919 to 1923. There, in 1922, he appeared as Long John Silver in J. B. Fagan's adaptation of Treasure Island. He toured with the play in 1923, and brought it back to the Strand the following year. In 1921 he appeared in the Hugh Ford film The Great Day. He also played Iago in 1920.

In his later years, Bourchier became involved in politics, writing a pamphlet for the Independent Labour Party in 1926 on "Art and Culture in Relation to Socialism". At the time of his death he had been selected as Labour Party parliamentary candidate for Gloucester. At the subsequent election, his Labour Party successor failed by the narrow margin of 493 votes to defeat the Conservative candidate. In the last year of his life Bourchier embarked on a tour of South Africa. His departure was marked by a luncheon at Claridge's at which he was presented with a bronze bust of himself commissioned by old members of the OUDS in recognition of his work in founding and later subsidising the society.

Bourchier became ill in South Africa and died of pneumonia in Johannesburg in 1927 at the age of 64.

=== Reputation ===
"The Fairy's Dilemma at the Garrick Theatre", in Play Pictorial, March 1904, showing O. B. Clarence, Sydney Valentine, Bourchier, and Violet Vanbrugh

The Manchester Guardian wrote of Bourchier, "A certain coarseness, a certain bluff geniality and with it a certain slyness, were all part of his composition as a stage personality, [but] in spite of his great vitality it was not in violent or exuberant parts that he shone... his artistic merit was that he could always get his best effects very quietly." The Times said, "Never a great actor, he was nevertheless always a conspicuous figure in the theatrical world. He brought to his work an enthusiasm for the stage which gave to performances not artistically distinguished a curious effect of personal distinction.... Sometimes his interpretations seemed to be misguided and his methods extravagantly theatrical, but here at least was an actor who was never colourless and, therefore, seldom dull."

The critic C. E. Montague was quoted as saying of Bourchier's Macbeth, "Even murder cannot be as serious as all that." Gilbert said of Bourchier's Hamlet, "At last we can settle whether Bacon or Shakespeare wrote the plays. Have the coffins opened and whichever has turned in his grave is the author."
