= The Importance of Being Earnest =

Farcical comedy play by Oscar Wilde

- Original production, 1895; Allan Aynesworth as Algernon (left) and George Alexander as Jack
- Written by: Oscar Wilde
- Genre: Comedy
- Setting: Mayfair, London, and a country house in Hertfordshire

Premiere
- Date: 14 February 1895
- Place: St James's Theatre, London, England

The Importance of Being Earnest, a Trivial Comedy for Serious People is a play by Oscar Wilde, the last of his four drawing-room plays, following Lady Windermere's Fan (1892), A Woman of No Importance (1893) and An Ideal Husband (1895). First performed on 14 February 1895 at the St James's Theatre in London, it is a farcical comedy depicting the tangled affairs of two young men about town who lead double lives to evade unwanted social obligations, both assuming the name Ernest while wooing the two young women of their affections.

The play, celebrated for its wit and repartee, parodies contemporary dramatic norms, gently satirises late Victorian manners, and introduces – in addition to the two pairs of young lovers – the formidable Lady Bracknell, the fussy governess Miss Prism and the benign and scholarly Canon Chasuble. Contemporary reviews in Britain and overseas praised the play's humour, although some critics had reservations about its lack of social messages.

The successful opening night marked the climax of Wilde's career but was followed within weeks by his downfall. The Marquess of Queensberry, whose son Lord Alfred Douglas was Wilde's lover, unsuccessfully schemed to throw a bouquet of rotten vegetables at the playwright at the end of the performance. This feud led to a series of legal trials from March to May 1895 which resulted in Wilde's conviction and imprisonment for homosexual acts. Despite the play's early success, Wilde's disgrace caused it to be closed in May after 86 performances. After his release from prison in 1897 he published the play from exile in Paris, but he wrote no more comic or dramatic works.

From the early 20th century onwards the play has been revived frequently. After the first production, which featured George Alexander, Allan Aynesworth and Irene Vanbrugh among others, many actors have been associated with the play, including Mabel Terry-Lewis, John Gielgud, Edith Evans, Margaret Rutherford, Martin Jarvis, Nigel Havers and Judi Dench. The role of the redoubtable Lady Bracknell has sometimes been played by men. The Importance of Being Earnest has been adapted for radio from the 1920s onwards and for television since the 1930s, filmed for the cinema on three occasions (directed by Anthony Asquith in 1952, Kurt Baker in 1992 and Oliver Parker in 2002) and turned into operas and musicals.

== Synopsis ==
The play is set in "The Present" (1895 at the time of the premiere).

=== Act I ===
Algernon Moncrieff's flat in Half Moon Street

Jack (George Alexander) tells Gwendolen (Irene Vanbrugh) the address of his country house, while Algernon (Allan Aynesworth) secretly overhears.

Algernon Moncrieff, a young man about town, is visited by a friend whom he knows by the name of Ernest Worthing. The latter has come from the country to propose to Algernon's cousin, Gwendolen Fairfax. Algernon refuses to consent until Ernest explains why his cigarette case bears the inscription, "From little Cecily, with her fondest love to her dear Uncle Jack". Worthing is forced to admit to living a double life. In the country, he assumes a serious attitude for the benefit of his young ward, the heiress Cecily Cardew, and goes by the name of John or Jack, while pretending that he must worry about a wastrel younger brother in London, named Ernest. Meanwhile, he assumes the identity of the profligate Ernest when in town. Algernon confesses a similar deception: he pretends to have a sickly friend named Bunbury in the country, whom he can "visit" whenever he wishes to avoid an unwelcome social obligation. Jack refuses to tell Algernon the location of his country estate.

Gwendolen and her formidable mother, Lady Bracknell, now call on Algernon, who distracts Lady Bracknell in another room while Jack proposes to Gwendolen. She accepts but says she could not love him if his name were not Ernest. He resolves secretly to be rechristened. Discovering the two in this intimate exchange, Lady Bracknell interviews Jack as a prospective suitor for her daughter. Horrified to learn that he was adopted – having been found as a baby in a handbag deposited at Victoria Station in London – she refuses him and forbids further contact with her daughter. Gwendolen manages to covertly promise to him her undying love. As Jack gives her his address in the country, Algernon surreptitiously notes it on the cuff of his sleeve: Jack's revelation of his pretty young ward has motivated his friend to meet her.

=== Act II ===
The Garden of the Manor House, Woolton

Alexander in Act II (1909 revival)

Cecily is studying with her governess, Miss Prism, in the (fictitious) village of Woolton, Hertfordshire. Algernon arrives, pretending to be Jack's brother, Ernest Worthing, and soon charms Cecily. Long fascinated by her uncle Jack's hitherto-absent dissolute brother, she is predisposed to fall for Algernon in his role of Ernest. Algernon plans for the rector, Dr Chasuble, to rechristen him "Ernest".

Jack, who has decided to abandon his double life, arrives in black funeral attire and announces to Miss Prism and Dr Chasuble his brother Ernest's death in Paris, from a severe chill. His story is undermined by Cecily, who enters to inform Jack that Ernest arrived earlier. Gwendolen enters, having left the Bracknells' London house without her mother's knowledge. During the temporary absence of the two men she meets Cecily. They get along well at first, but when each learns of the other's engagement to Ernest Worthing, hostility between them grows as they assert their respective claims over Ernest. When Jack and Algernon reappear together, Gwendolen and Cecily realise they have been deceived; they leave the men in the garden and withdraw to the house.

=== Act III ===
Morning-room at the Manor House, Woolton

Gwendolen and Cecily forgive the men's trickery. Arriving in pursuit of her daughter, Lady Bracknell is astonished to be told that Algernon and Cecily are engaged. The revelation of Cecily's wealth soon dispels Lady Bracknell's initial doubts over the young lady's suitability, but any engagement is forbidden by her guardian, Jack: he will consent only if Lady Bracknell agrees to his own union with Gwendolen – something she declines to do.

The impasse is resolved by the return of Miss Prism, whom Lady Bracknell recognises as the person who, 28 years earlier as a family nursemaid, had taken a baby boy out in a perambulator from Lord Bracknell's house and never returned. Challenged, Miss Prism explains that she had absent-mindedly put into the perambulator the manuscript of a novel she was writing, and put the baby in a handbag, which she later left at Victoria Station. Jack produces the same handbag, showing that he is the lost baby, the eldest son of Lady Bracknell's late sister, Mrs Moncrieff, and thus Algernon's elder brother. Having acquired such respectable relations, he is acceptable as Gwendolen's suitor.

Gwendolen continues to insist that she can love only a man named Ernest. Lady Bracknell tells Jack that, as the firstborn, he would have been named after his father, General Moncrieff. Jack examines the Army Lists and discovers that his father's name – and hence his own original christening name – was, in fact, Ernest. As the happy couples embrace – Ernest and Gwendolen, Algernon and Cecily, and even Dr Chasuble and Miss Prism – Lady Bracknell complains to her newfound relative: "My nephew, you seem to be displaying signs of triviality." He replies, "On the contrary, Aunt Augusta: I've now realized for the first time in my life the vital Importance of Being Earnest."

== Composition ==
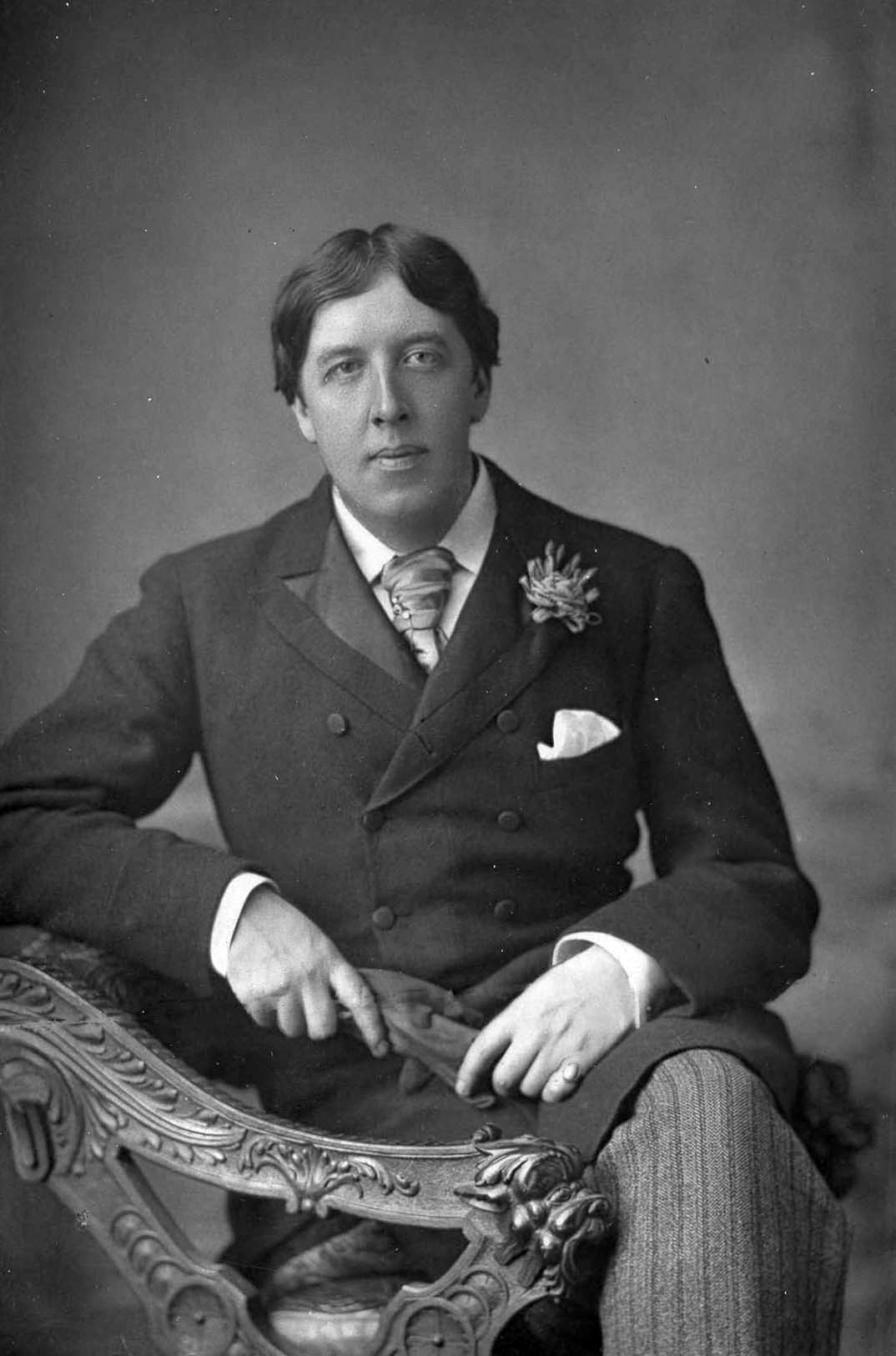
Oscar Wilde in 1889

The Importance of Being Earnest followed the success of Wilde's earlier drawing room plays, Lady Windermere's Fan (1892), A Woman of No Importance (1893) and An Ideal Husband (1895). He spent the summer of 1894 with his family at Worthing, on the Sussex coast, where he began work on the new play.

Wilde scholars generally agree that the most important influence on the play was W. S. Gilbert's 1877 farce Engaged, from which Wilde borrowed not only several incidents but also, in the words of Russell Jackson in his 1980 introduction to Wilde's play, "the gravity of tone demanded by Gilbert of his actors". Wilde's first draft was so long that it filled four exercise books, and over the summer he continually revised and refined it, as he had done with his earlier plays. Among his many changes he altered the subtitle from "a Serious Comedy for Trivial People" to "a Trivial Comedy for Serious People", and renamed the characters Lady Brancaster and Algernon Montford as Lady Bracknell and Algernon Moncrieff.

Wilde wrote the part of John Worthing with the actor-manager Charles Wyndham in mind. Wilde shared Bernard Shaw's view that Wyndham was the ideal comedy actor and based the character on his stage persona. Wyndham accepted the play for production at his theatre, but before rehearsals began, he changed his plans in order to help a beleaguered colleague, the actor-manager George Alexander of the St James's Theatre. In early 1895 Alexander's production of Henry James's Guy Domville failed, and closed after 31 performances, leaving Alexander in urgent need of a new play to follow it. Wyndham waived his contractual rights and allowed Alexander to stage Wilde's play.

After working with Wilde on stage movements, using a model theatre, Alexander asked the author to shorten the play from four acts to three. Wilde complied and combined elements of the second and third acts. The largest cut was the removal of the character of Mr Gribsby, a solicitor who comes from London to serve a writ on the profligate "Ernest" Worthing for unpaid dining bills at the Savoy Hotel. Wilde was not entirely happy with alterations made at Alexander's behest. He said, "Yes, it is quite a good play. I remember I wrote one very like it myself, but it was even more brilliant than this", but the three-act version usually performed is widely considered more effective than Wilde's four-act original. (Note: The deleted scene with the solicitor was thought lost until it was found in some of Wilde's papers and was first performed on BBC radio on 27 October 1954.)

== First productions ==
The play was first produced at the St James's Theatre, London, on 14 February – Valentine's Day – 1895, preceded by a curtain-raiser, a short comedy called In the Season, by Langdon E. Mitchell. During most of the month-long rehearsal period Wilde was on holiday in Algeria with his partner, Lord Alfred Douglas, but he returned in time for the dress rehearsal on 12 February. Douglas remained in Algiers; his father, the Marquess of Queensberry, planned to disrupt the premiere by throwing a bouquet of rotten vegetables at the playwright when he took his bow at the end. Wilde learned of the plan and Alexander cancelled Queensberry's ticket and arranged for the police to bar his entrance. Wilde wrote to Douglas, "He arrived with a prize fighter!! (Note: Queensberry had been a prize fighter himself in his younger days, and retained what one historian calls "his band of bruisers".) I had all Scotland Yard to guard the theatre. He prowled around for three hours, then left chattering like a monstrous ape". Queensberry left the bouquet at the theatre entrance.

Wilde arrived for the premiere dressed in "florid sobriety", wearing a green carnation in his lapel. Allan Aynesworth, who played Algernon Moncrieff, recalled to Hesketh Pearson:

In my fifty-three years of acting, I never remember a greater triumph than the first night of The Importance of Being Earnest ... The audience rose in their seats and cheered and cheered again.

The theatrical newspaper The Era reported that the play "met with enthusiastic and unanimous approval" and confidently predicted "a long and prosperous run". Aynesworth was "debonair and stylish", and Alexander, who played Jack Worthing, "demure"; according to The Era, "Mr George Alexander played Worthing just as a part of this sort should be played, i.e., with entire seriousness and no indication of purposed irony". The Morning Post said that Irene Vanbrugh and Evelyn Millard could not be bettered and caught the required Gilbertian tone. The Observer remarked on the "rapturous amusement" of the audience, and echoed The Era's prediction of a long run.

According to the published text, the characters, descriptions and cast comprised:

John Worthing, JP	of the Manor House, Woolton, Hertfordshire	George Alexander
Algernon Moncrieff	his friend	Allan Aynesworth
Rev Canon Chasuble, DD	Rector of Woolton	H. H. Vincent
Merriman	butler to Mr Worthing	Frank Dyall
Lane	Mr Moncrieff's manservant	F. Kinsey Peile
Lady Bracknell		Rose Leclercq
Hon Gwendolen Fairfax	her daughter	Irene Vanbrugh
Cecily Cardew	John Worthing's ward	Evelyn Millard (succeeded by Violet Lyster) (Note: Alexander released Millard from her contract at the St James's at the beginning of March to enable her to take over at short notice from the ailing Marion Terry in the lead role in Sydney Grundy's Sowing the Wind at the Comedy Theatre. Millard's understudy, Violet Lyster, took over the role of Cecily.)
Miss Prism	her governess	Mrs George Canninge

Irene Vanbrugh as Gwendolen and Evelyn Millard as Cecily

Rose Leclercq as Lady Bracknell, from a sketch of the first production

Mrs George Canninge as Miss Prism, and Evelyn Millard as Cecily

Aynesworth and Alexander as Algernon and Jack in Act II

Queensberry continued harassing Wilde, who within weeks launched a private prosecution against him for criminal libel, triggering a series of trials that revealed Wilde's homosexual private life and ended in his imprisonment for gross indecency in May 1895. The Victorian public turned against him after his arrest, and box-office receipts dwindled rapidly; Alexander tried to save the production by removing the author's name from the playbills, (Note: Removing Wilde's name from the play billing caused a breach between the author and Alexander that lasted for some years; the actor later paid Wilde small monthly sums and bequeathed his rights in the play to the author's son Vyvyan Holland.) but it closed on 8 May after only 83 performances.

The play's original Broadway production opened at the Empire Theatre on 22 April 1895 but closed after sixteen performances. Its cast included William Faversham as Algernon, Henry Miller as Jack, Viola Allen as Gwendolen and Ida Vernon as Lady Bracknell. The Australian premiere was in Melbourne on 10 August 1895, presented by Robert Brough and Dion Boucicault Jr., with Cecil Ward as Jack, Boucicault as Algernon and Jenny Watt-Tanner as Lady Bracknell. The production was an immediate success. Wilde's downfall in England did not affect the popularity of his plays in Australia. (Note: In a 2003 study, Richard Fotheringham writes that in Australia, unlike Britain and the US, Wilde's name was only briefly excluded from playbills, and the critics and public took a much more relaxed view of his crimes. A command performance of the play was given by Boucicault's company in the presence of the Governor of Victoria and his wife.) The same company presented the New Zealand premiere in October 1895, when the play was enthusiastically received. Reviewers said, "in subtlety of thought, brilliancy of wit and sparkling humour, it has scarcely been excelled"; and "its fun is irresistible ... increasing in intensity until in the third and last act it becomes uproarious".

== Critical opinion ==
Reviewers of the premiere, clockwise from top left: William Archer, A. B. Walkley, H. G. Wells and Bernard Shaw

In contrast with much theatre of the time, the light plot of The Importance of Being Earnest does not address serious social and political issues, and this troubled some contemporary reviewers. Though unsure of Wilde's seriousness as a dramatist, they recognised the play's cleverness, humour and popularity. Shaw found the play "extremely funny" but "heartless", a view he maintained all his life. (Note: In 1950, months before his death, he wrote: "Do not let yourself be trapped into the silly cliché that The Importance is Wilde's best play. It's a mechanical cat's cradle farce without a single touch of human nature in it. It is Gilbert and Sullivan minus Sullivan".) His review in the Saturday Review argued that comedy should touch as well as amuse: "I go to the theatre to be moved to laughter, not to be tickled or bustled into it".

In The World, William Archer wrote that he had enjoyed watching the play but found it to be empty of meaning: "What can a poor critic do with a play which raises no principle, whether of art or morals, creates its own canons and conventions, and is nothing but an absolutely wilful expression of an irrepressibly witty personality?" In The Speaker, A. B. Walkley admired the play and was one of few to see it as the culmination of Wilde's dramatic career. He denied that the term "farce" was derogatory or even lacking in seriousness and said, "It is of nonsense all compact, and better nonsense, I think, our stage has not seen".

H. G. Wells, in an unsigned review for The Pall Mall Gazette, called the play one of the freshest comedies of the year, saying, "More humorous dealing with theatrical conventions it would be difficult to imagine". He also questioned whether people would fully see its message, "... how Serious People will take this Trivial Comedy intended for their learning remains to be seen. No doubt seriously". The play was so light-hearted that some reviewers compared it to comic opera rather than drama. W. H. Auden later (1963) called it "a pure verbal opera", and The Times commented, "The story is almost too preposterous to go without music". Mary McCarthy, in Sights and Spectacles (1959), despite thinking the play extremely funny, called it "a ferocious idyll"; "depravity is the hero and the only character".

As Wilde's works came to be read and performed again in the early 20th century, it was The Importance of Being Earnest that received the most productions. The critic and author Max Beerbohm called the play Wilde's "finest, most undeniably his own", saying that the plots of his other comedies – Lady Windermere's Fan, A Woman of No Importance and An Ideal Husband – follow the manner of Victorien Sardou, (Note: Sardou is described in The New Oxford Companion to Literature in French as a "Highly successful French dramatist, a brilliant manipulator of empty but complicated plots and spectacular theatrical effects ... the melodramas and historical plays are merely sumptuously dressed machines for producing coups de théâtre".) and are similarly unrelated to the theme of the work, while in The Importance of Being Earnest "there is a perfect fusion of manner and form. It would be truer to say that the form is swallowed". By the time of its centenary in 1995 the journalist Mark Lawson described the piece as "the second most known and quoted play in English after Hamlet".

== Revivals ==
=== 1895–1929 ===
Lilian Braithwaite as Cecily, 1901

The Importance of Being Earnest and Wilde's three other drawing room plays were performed in Britain during the author's imprisonment and exile by small touring groups. A. B. Tapping's company toured The Importance between October 1895 and March 1896, (Note: An article in The Wildean in 2015 speculated that Tapping's production of the play in Limerick in late October 1895 may have been the first staging of the piece in Wilde's native Ireland.) and Elsie Lanham's touring company presented it along with Lady Windermere's Fan, beginning in November 1899. The play was well received; one local critic described it as "sparkling with wit and epigrams", and another called it "a most entertaining comedy [with] some sparkling dialogue".

The play was not seen again in London until after Wilde's death in 1900. Alexander revived it in the small Coronet theatre in Notting Hill, outside the West End, in December the following year, after taking it on tour, starring as John Worthing, with a cast that included the young Lilian Braithwaite as Cecily. The Manchester Guardian called the piece "a brilliant play". The Importance of Being Earnest returned to the West End when Alexander presented a revival at the St James's in 1902. It was billed as "By the author of Lady Windermere's Fan", and few reviews mentioned Wilde's name, but his work was praised. The Sporting Times said:

The trivial comedy revived at the St James's is as witty an evening's entertainment as any worldling could desire. It is all as light as a good soufflé. The ladies talk like Mr W. S. Gilbert's fairies do, and are supernaturally clever; the men emit sparkles of wit even when their mouths are full of cucumber sandwiches or crumpets ... I can guarantee that the most blasé young man of twenty-two will have one chuckle a minute at the St James's. You are tickled throughout with a feather, and it is a very pleasant and comforting sensation.

The revival ran for 52 performances. For the first Broadway revival, by Charles Frohman's Empire Stock Company later in 1902, the playbills and the reviews restored the author's name.

Leslie Faber (centre) as Jack, 1923 revival, with Louise Hampton as Miss Prism and H. O. Nicholson as Dr Chasuble

Alexander presented the work again at the St James's in 1909, when he and Aynesworth reprised their original roles; that revival ran for 316 performances. Max Beerbohm said that the play was sure to become a classic of the English repertory and that its humour was as fresh then as when it had been written, adding that the actors had "worn as well as the play".

The play was revived on Broadway in 1910 with a cast that included Hamilton Revelle, A. E. Matthews and Jane Oaker. The New York Times commented that the play "has lost nothing of its humor ... no one with a sense of humor can afford to miss it". For a 1913 revival at the St James's, the young actors Gerald Ames and A. E. Matthews succeeded the creators as Jack and Algernon.

Leslie Faber as Jack, John Deverell as Algernon and Margaret Scudamore as Lady Bracknell headed the cast in a 1923 production at the Haymarket Theatre. Revivals in the first decades of the 20th century treated "the present" as the current year. It was not until the 1920s that the case for 1890s costumes was established; as a critic in The Manchester Guardian put it, "Thirty years on, one begins to feel that Wilde should be done in the costume of his period – that his wit today needs the backing of the atmosphere that gave it life and truth. ... Wilde's glittering and complex verbal felicities go ill with the shingle and the short skirt".

=== 1930–2000 ===
Anthony Ireland and John Gielgud with Iris Baker and Heather Angel, Lyric, Hammersmith, 1930

In Nigel Playfair's 1930 production at the Lyric, Hammersmith, John Gielgud played Jack to the Lady Bracknell of his aunt, Mabel Terry-Lewis. An Old Vic production in 1934 featured the husband-and-wife team of Charles Laughton and Elsa Lanchester as Chasuble and Miss Prism; others in the cast were Roger Livesey (Jack), George Curzon (Algernon), Athene Seyler (Lady Bracknell), Flora Robson (Gwendolen) and Ursula Jeans (Cecily). On Broadway, Estelle Winwood co-starred with Clifton Webb and Hope Williams in a 1939 revival.

Gielgud produced and starred in a production at the Globe (now the Gielgud) Theatre in 1939, in a cast that included Edith Evans as Lady Bracknell, Joyce Carey as Gwendolen, Angela Baddeley as Cecily and Margaret Rutherford as Miss Prism. The Times considered the production the best since the original and praised it for its fidelity to Wilde's conception and its "airy, responsive ball-playing quality". Later in the same year, Gielgud presented the work again, with Jack Hawkins as Algernon, Gwen Ffrangcon-Davies as Gwendolen and Peggy Ashcroft as Cecily, with Evans and Rutherford in their previous roles. The production was presented in several seasons during and after the Second World War, with mostly the same principal players. During a 1946 season at the Haymarket, the King and Queen attended a performance, which, as the journalist Geoffrey Wheatcroft put it, gave the play "a final accolade of respectability". (Note: George VI was not the first British king who had attended a performance of the play: his grandfather Edward VII, then Prince of Wales, was in the audience for the first production.) Gielgud's London production toured North America and was successfully staged on Broadway in 1947. (Note: Rutherford switched roles, from Miss Prism to Lady Bracknell for the North American production; Jean Cadell played Miss Prism. Robert Flemyng played Algernon. The cast was given a special Tony Award for "Outstanding Foreign Company".)

In 1975 Jonathan Miller, who had been prevented for financial reasons the previous year from staging the play at the National Theatre with an all-male cast, directed a production in which Lady Bracknell, played by Irene Handl, was given a German accent. For Peter Hall's 1982 production at the National Theatre the cast included Judi Dench as Lady Bracknell, (Note: Twenty-three years earlier, Dench had played Cecily to the Lady Bracknell of Fay Compton in a 1959 Old Vic production that included in the cast Alec McCowen, Barbara Jefford, and Miles Malleson.) Martin Jarvis as Jack, Nigel Havers as Algernon, Zoë Wanamaker as Gwendolen and Anna Massey as Miss Prism. In 1987 a version of the play was given at the Whitehall Theatre starring Hinge and Bracket as Miss Prism and Lady Bracknell respectively. Nicholas Hytner's 1993 production at the Aldwych Theatre, starring Maggie Smith, had occasional references to a conjectural gay subtext.

=== 21st century ===
The play was presented in Singapore in 2004 by the British Theatre Playhouse, and the same company took the production to Greenwich Theatre, London, in 2005. In 2007 Peter Gill directed the play at the Theatre Royal, Bath. The production went on a short UK tour before playing in the West End in 2008.

Since the 1987 Whitehall version, some other productions have cast a male actor in the role of Lady Bracknell. In 2005 the Abbey Theatre, Dublin, presented the play with an all-male cast; it also featured Wilde as a character – the play opened with him drinking in a Parisian café, dreaming of his play. The Melbourne Theatre Company staged a production in 2011 with Geoffrey Rush as Lady Bracknell. In the same year the Roundabout Theatre Company presented a Broadway revival based on the 2009 Stratford Shakespeare Festival production featuring its director, Brian Bedford, as Lady Bracknell. At the Vaudeville Theatre, London, in 2015, David Suchet took the role in a production directed by Adrian Noble.

In 2014 at the Harold Pinter Theatre, London, Lucy Bailey directed a production that followed a trend to "age-blind" casting: the average age of the cast was nearly seventy, and Jarvis and Havers reprised the roles they had played at the National in 1982. In 2024 the Royal Exchange Theatre, Manchester presented an updated version, described by The Guardian as "a convincing stab at a 21st-century makeover". In November 2024 the National Theatre again revived the play, in a new production by Max Webster. The production was recast for a transfer to the Noël Coward Theatre in September 2025. The two casts included Hugh Skinner/Nathan Stewart-Jarrett (John Worthing), Ncuti Gatwa/Olly Alexander (Algernon), Richard Cant/Hugh Dennis (Canon Chasuble), Sharon D. Clarke/Stephen Fry (Lady Bracknell), Ronkẹ Adékọluẹ́jọ́/Kitty Hawthorne (Gwendolen), Eliza Scanlen/Jessica Whitehurst (Cecily) and Amanda Lawrence/Shobna Gulati (Miss Prism).

== Publication ==
=== First edition ===
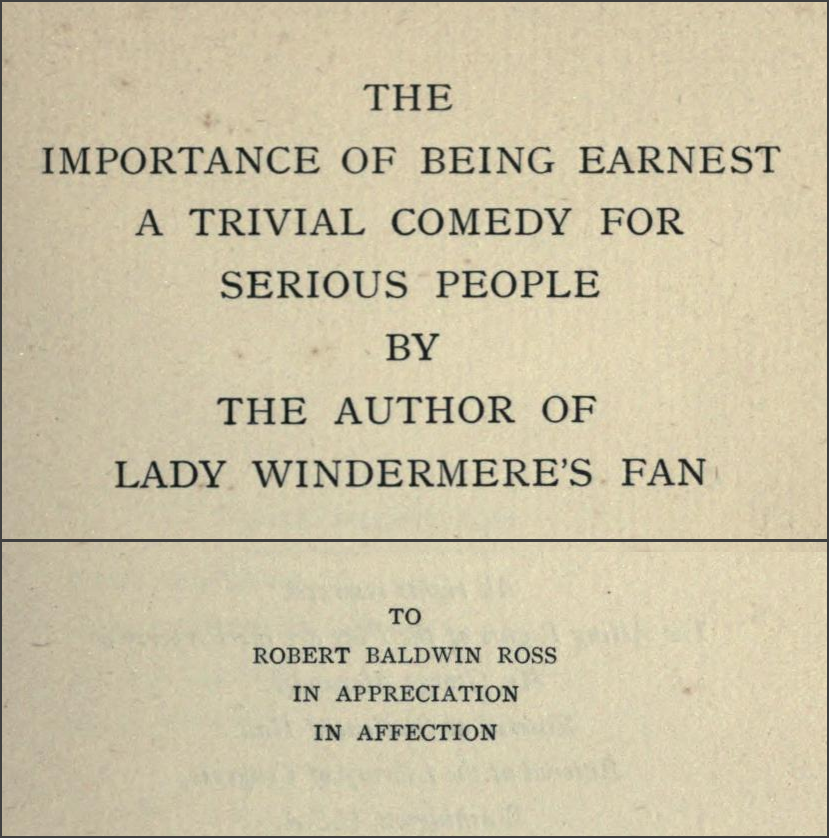
Title pages of the first edition, 1899, with Wilde's name omitted from the first page, and the dedication to Robbie Ross on the second

Wilde's two final comedies, An Ideal Husband and The Importance of Being Earnest, were still on stage in London at the time of his prosecution in 1895, and they were soon closed as the details of his case became public. After two years in prison with hard labour, Wilde went into exile in Paris, sick and depressed, his reputation destroyed in England. In 1898 Leonard Smithers agreed with Wilde to publish the two final plays.

Wilde proved to be a diligent reviser, sending detailed instructions on stage directions, character listings and the book's presentation and insisting that a playbill from the first performance be reproduced inside. Ellmann argues that the proofs show a man "very much in command of himself and of the play". Wilde's name did not appear on the cover, which stated: "By the Author of Lady Windermere's Fan". His return to work was brief, as he refused to write anything else: "I can write, but have lost the joy of writing".

=== In translation ===
The Importance of Being Earnest's popularity has meant it has been translated into many languages, but the pun in the title ("Ernest", a masculine proper name, and "earnest", steadfast and serious) poses a special problem for translators. The simplest instance of a suitable translation of the pun is in German, where ernst (serious) and Ernst (given name) are the same. (Note: Nonetheless there are many different possible titles in German, mostly concerning sentence structure. The two most common are Bunbury oder ernst / Ernst sein ist alles and Bunbury oder wie wichtig es ist, ernst / Ernst zu sein Bunbury or Ernst/ Serious is everything and Bunbury or How Important it is to be Serious / To be serious.)

Wilde by Henri de Toulouse-Lautrec (1896)

As wordplay is usually unique to the language in question, translators are faced with a choice of either staying faithful to the original or creating a similar pun in their own language. Some translators leave all characters' names unchanged and in their original spelling: readers are reminded of the original cultural setting, but the liveliness of the pun is lost. Others, favouring comprehensibility over fidelity to the original, have replaced Ernest with a name that also represents a virtue in the target language. For instance, Italian versions variously call the play L'importanza di essere Franco/Severo/Fedele, the given names being respectively the values of honesty, propriety and fidelity. Translators differ in their approach to the original English honorific titles; some change them all or none, but most leave a mix, partly as a compensation for the loss of Englishness.

French offers a closer pun. According to Les Archives du spectacle in its listing of productions in French since 1954, the title of the play is most often given as L'Importance d'être Constant, (Note: "Constant" is both a French first name and an adjective meaning steadfast.) but has also been rendered as L'Importance d'être sérieux, Il est important d'être aimé, Il est important d'être Désiré and Il est important d'être Fidèle. (Note: The Importance of Being Serious, It Is Important to be Loved, It Is Important to be Desired and It Is Important to be Faithful, Désiré and Fidèle being given names.)

== Analysis ==
=== Structure and genre ===
The novelist and critic Arthur Ransome argued that Wilde freed himself by abandoning the melodrama of his earlier drawing room plays and basing the story entirely on the Earnest/Ernest verbal conceit. Freed from "living up to any drama more serious than conversation", Wilde could now amuse himself to a fuller extent with "quips, bons mots, epigrams and repartee that had really nothing to do with the business at hand". The academic Sos Eltis comments that although Wilde's earliest and longest handwritten drafts of the play are full of "farcical accidents, broad puns and a number of familiar comic devices", in his revisions "Wilde transformed standard nonsense into the more systematic and disconcerting illogicality which characterizes Earnest's dialogue".

The genre of The Importance of Being Earnest has been debated by scholars and critics, who have variously categorised it as high comedy, farce, parody and satire. In a 1956 critique Richard Foster argues that the play creates "an 'as if' world in which 'real' values are inverted, reason and unreason are interchanged and the probable defined by improbability". Contributors to The Cambridge Companion to Oscar Wilde (1997) variously refer to the play as "high farce", "an ostensible farce", "farce with aggressive pranks, quick-paced action and evasion of moral responsibility", and "high comedy".

=== Triviality ===
Ransome described The Importance of Being Earnest as the most trivial of Wilde's society plays, and the only one that produces "that peculiar exhilaration of the spirit by which we recognise the beautiful ... It is precisely because it is consistently trivial that it is not ugly". Salome, An Ideal Husband and The Picture of Dorian Gray had dwelt on more serious wrongdoing, but vice in The Importance of Being Earnest is represented by Algernon's greedy consumption of cucumber sandwiches. (Note: Wilde himself evidently took sandwiches with due seriousness. Max Beerbohm recounted in a letter to Reggie Turner Wilde's difficulty in obtaining a satisfactory offering: "He ordered a watercress sandwich, which in due course was brought to him: Not a thin, diaphanous green thing, such as he had meant, but a very stout, satisfying article of food. This he ate with assumed disgust (but evident relish) and when he paid the waiter, he said: 'Tell the cook of this restaurant with the compliments of Mr Oscar Wilde that these are the very worst sandwiches in the whole world and that, when I ask for a watercress sandwich, I do not mean a loaf with a field in the middle of it.'") Wilde told his friend Robbie Ross that the play's theme was "That we should treat all trivial things in life very seriously, and all serious things of life with a sincere and studied triviality". The theme is glanced at in the play's title, and earnestness is repeatedly alluded to in the dialogue; Algernon says in Act II, "one must be serious about something if one is to have any amusement in life", but goes on to reproach Jack for being serious about everything and thus revealing a trivial nature. Blackmail and corruption had haunted the double lives of Dorian Gray and Sir Robert Chiltern (in An Ideal Husband), but in Earnest the protagonists' duplicity (Algernon's "Bunburying" and Worthing's double life as Jack and Ernest) is for more innocent purposes – largely to evade unwelcome social obligations. While much theatre of the time tackled serious social and political issues, Wilde's writing in this play is the antithesis of that of didactic writers like Shaw who used their characters to present audiences with grand ideals and appeals for social justice.

=== Satire and parody ===
The play repeatedly mocks Victorian traditions and social customs – marriage and the pursuit of love in particular. In Victorian times earnestness was considered by some to be the overriding societal value; originating in religious attempts to reform the lower classes, it spread to the middle and upper classes during the mid-19th century. The play's subtitle introduces the theme, which continues in the discussion between Jack and Algernon in Act I: "Yes, but you must be serious about it. I hate people who are not serious about meals. It is so shallow of them".

Gwendolen (Irene Vanbrugh), Merriman (Frank Dyall) and Cecily (Evelyn Millard), in the original production, Act II

Wilde's inversion of values continues: when Algernon arrives in Woolton masquerading as Ernest he tells Cecily that he is not really wicked at all.

CECILY: If you are not, then you have certainly been deceiving us all in a very inexcusable manner. I hope you have not been leading a double life, pretending to be wicked and being really good all the time. That would be hypocrisy.

In the final scene Jack asks Gwendolen if she can forgive him for not having been deceitful after all:

JACK: Gwendolen, it is a terrible thing for a man to find out suddenly that all his life he has been speaking nothing but the truth. Can you forgive me?
GWENDOLEN: I can, for I feel that you are sure to change.

In turn, Gwendolen and Cecily wish to marry a man named Ernest. Gwendolen ignores her mother's methodical analysis of Jack Worthing's suitability as a husband and places her entire faith in a forename, declaring in Act I, "The only really safe name is Ernest". This is an opinion shared by Cecily in Act II: "I pity any poor married woman whose husband is not called Ernest". Wilde portrayed society's rules and rituals in the figure of Lady Bracknell: according to the Wilde scholar Peter Raby, minute attention to the details of her style created a comic effect of assertion by restraint. She dismisses Jack's London address as on the unfashionable side of Belgrave Square and is unmoved by Jack's explanation that the handbag in which he was found as a baby was deposited in the cloakroom of the socially superior half of Victoria Station. (Note: At the time, Victoria Station consisted of two separate but adjacent terminal stations sharing the same name. To the east was the ramshackle LC&D Railway, on the west the up-market LB&SCR – the Brighton Line, which went to Worthing, the fashionable town to which the gentleman who found baby Jack was travelling at the time (and after which Jack was named).)

Wilde parodies 19th-century melodrama, introducing exaggeratedly incongruous situations such as Jack's arrival in full mourning for the brother who has just walked into his house, and the sudden switch from fulsome affection between Cecily and Gwendolen to deep hostility on discovering that they are supposedly both engaged to the same man.

=== Conjectural homosexual subtext ===
In queer theory the play's themes of duplicity and ambivalence are inextricably bound up with Wilde's homosexuality, so that the play exhibits what one critic terms a "flickering presence-absence of ... homosexual desire". After his release from prison, Wilde wrote to Reginald Turner, "It was extraordinary reading the play over. How I used to toy with that tiger Life!" In a 2014 study, William Eaton writes, "The Importance of Being Earnest is what it obviously is, a play about dissimulation, and that dissimulation – not seeming to be who one was – was extremely important for homosexuals of Wilde's time and place, and thus was an extremely non-trivial matter for Wilde". (Note: Deconstructionist approaches to the play have interpreted the prominence of linguistic destabilisation, particularly punning, as reflecting the destabilisation of the social world in which heterosexuality is assumed, default and dominant. Eve Kosofsky Sedgwick, a proponent of queer theory, contends that the play continually undercuts the idea that there is a "natural" correspondence between what things or people are called and what they are (with particular reference to the importance of fathers and fathers' names). She concurs with Christopher Craft that Wilde's persistent subversion of the normal meaning of words undermines the norms of society, including the assumption that all men should be heterosexual and conventionally masculine, and that there is a natural path for a man's story that ends in heterosexual family life.)

Eve Kosofsky Sedgwick, a proponent of queer theory, interprets linguistic aspects of the play as allusions to gay culture and stereotypes, such as references to the German language and the composer Richard Wagner, both of which were associated with male homosexuality in Wilde's day. In 1990 Noel Annan suggested that the use of the name Ernest may have been a homosexual in-joke. In 1892, two years before Wilde began writing the play, John Gambril Nicholson had published a book of pederastic poetry, Love in Earnest. The sonnet "Of Boys' Names" included the verse:

Though Frank may ring like silver bell
and Cecil softer music claim
they cannot work the miracle
– 'tis Ernest sets my heart a-flame.

Annan speculated that "earnest" may also have been a private code-word among gay men, as in: "Is he earnest?" in the same way that "Is he musical?" is thought to have been used. Eaton finds this theory unconvincing, and in 2001 Sir Donald Sinden, an actor who had met Lord Alfred Douglas and two of the play's original cast (Irene Vanbrugh and Allan Aynesworth), wrote to The Times to rebut suggestions that "earnest" held any sexual connotations:

Although they had ample opportunity, at no time did any of them even hint that "Earnest" was a synonym for homosexual. The first time I heard it mentioned was in the 1980s, and I immediately consulted Sir John Gielgud, whose own performance of Jack Worthing in the same play was legendary, and whose knowledge of theatrical lore was encyclopaedic. He replied in his ringing tones: "No-No! Nonsense, absolute nonsense: I would have known".

=== Bunbury ===
Bunbury is a village in Cheshire. Several theories have been advanced to explain Wilde's use of the name to imply a secretive double life. It may have derived from Henry Shirley Bunbury, a hypochondriacal acquaintance of Wilde's youth. Another theory is that Wilde spotted the names of a Captain Bunbury and a magistrate, Mr Bunbury, in The Worthing Gazette in August and September 1894, found the surname pleasing and borrowed it.

A suggestion put forward by Aleister Crowley – who knew Wilde – was that Bunbury was a portmanteau word, coined after Wilde had taken a train to Banbury, met a boy there and arranged a second meeting at Sunbury. Carolyn Williams, in a 2010 study, writes that for the word "Bunburying", Wilde "braids the 'Belvawneying' evil eye from Gilbert's Engaged" with Bunthorne from Gilbert (and Sullivan)'s 1881 comic opera Patience. (Note: It is sometimes thought that Gilbert's Bunthorne was a caricature of Wilde, but the Gilbert scholar Andrew Crowther calls this "a popular misconception". The opera was produced before Wilde was famous enough to be caricatured.)

=== Use of language ===
Although Wilde had for several years been famous for dialogue and his use of language, Raby has argued that in this play the author achieved unity and mastery unmatched in his other plays, with the possible exception of Salome. Raby comments that although the earlier comedies suffer from an unevenness resulting from the thematic clash between the trivial and the serious, The Importance of Being Earnest achieves "a pitch-perfect style" that allows these clashes to dissolve. Raby identifies three different registers in the play. Algernon's exchange with his manservant conveys an underlying unity despite their differing attitudes. The imperious pronouncements of Lady Bracknell are as startling for her use of hyperbole and rhetorical extravagance as for her disconcerting opinions. In contrast, the discourse of Dr Chasuble and Miss Prism is distinguished by "pedantic precept" and "idiosyncratic diversion". The play is full of epigrams and paradoxes. Max Beerbohm described it as abounding in "chiselled apothegms – witticisms unrelated to action or character but so good in themselves as to have the quality of dramatic surprise".

=== Characterisation ===
Though Wilde deployed characters familiar to his audience – the upper-class dandy, the overbearing matriarch, the woman with a past, the puritanical young lady – his treatment is subtler than in his earlier comedies. Lady Bracknell, for instance, embodies respectable, upper-class society, but Eltis notes how her development "from the familiar overbearing duchess into a quirkier and more disturbing character" can be traced through Wilde's revisions of the play. For the two young men, Wilde presents not stereotypical stage "dudes" but intelligent beings who, as Russell Jackson puts it, "speak like their creator in well-formed complete sentences and rarely use slang or vogue-words". Dr Chasuble and Miss Prism are, in Jackson's view, characterised by "a few light touches of detail", their old-fashioned enthusiasms and the Canon's fastidious pedantry pared down by Wilde during his many redrafts of the text.

== Adaptations ==
=== Film ===
The Importance of Being Earnest has been adapted for the English-language cinema at least three times, first in 1952 by Anthony Asquith who adapted the screenplay and directed it. The cast included Michael Denison (Algernon), Michael Redgrave (Jack), Edith Evans (Lady Bracknell), Dorothy Tutin (Cecily), Joan Greenwood (Gwendolen), Margaret Rutherford (Miss Prism), and Miles Malleson (Dr Chasuble). In 1992 Kurt Baker directed a version using an all-black cast with Daryl Keith Roach as Jack, Wren T. Brown as Algernon, Ann Weldon as Lady Bracknell, Lanei Chapman as Cecily, Chris Calloway as Gwendolen, CCH Pounder as Miss Prism and Brock Peters as Dr Chasuble, set in the United States. In 2002 Oliver Parker, a director who had previously adapted An Ideal Husband, made another film. It stars Colin Firth (Jack), Rupert Everett (Algernon), Judi Dench (Lady Bracknell), Reese Witherspoon (Cecily), Frances O'Connor (Gwendolen), Anna Massey (Miss Prism) and Tom Wilkinson (Canon Chasuble). Parker interpolated about twenty lines of his own into the script and restored the episode cut by Wilde before the premiere of the play, in which a solicitor attempts to serve a writ on the supposed Ernest.

A 2008 Telugu language romantic comedy film, titled Ashta Chamma, is an adaptation of the play.

=== Operas and musicals ===
In 1963 Erik Chisholm composed an opera adaptation, basing the libretto on Wilde's text.Gerald Barry created the 2011 opera The Importance of Being Earnest, commissioned by the Los Angeles Philharmonic and the Barbican Centre in London. It premiered in Los Angeles in 2011. The role of Lady Bracknell is sung by a bass. The stage premiere was given by the Opéra national de Lorraine in Nancy in 2013. A 2012 concert performance was recorded live at the Barbican by the BBC and released commercially in 2014. In 2017 Odyssey Opera of Boston presented Mario Castelnuovo-Tedesco's opera The Importance of Being Earnest as part of a "Wilde Opera Nights" series, a season-long exploration of operatic works inspired by Wilde's writings and world.

A 1964 musical theatre adaptation is by Gerd Natschinski, titled Mein Freund Bunbury. in 2002, Robert Tanitch listed eight adaptations of the play as a musical, though "never with conspicuous success". The earliest such version was a 1927 American show titled Oh Earnest. A 1957 musical adaptation was titled Half in Earnest. A musical with a book by Douglas Livingstone and score by Adam McGuinness and Zia Moranne was staged in 2011 at the Riverside Studios, Hammersmith; the cast included Susie Blake, Gyles Brandreth and Edward Petherbridge. Kait Kerrigan, Bree Lowdermilk and Justin Elizabeth Sayre adapted the play into a queer and gender-inclusive musical titled Ernxst, Or The Importance of Being. Its 2026 cast album features J. Harrison Ghee, Krysta Rodriguez, Joy Woods, and Jeff Hiller.

=== Stage derivatives ===
Tom Stoppard's 1974 stage comedy Travesties draws extensively on Wilde's play. Stoppard's central character, Henry Carr, was a real-life figure who played Algernon in a production of The Importance of Being Earnest produced by James Joyce in Zurich in 1917. Stoppard reimagines him as an old man, reminiscing about the production and his days as a young man. The other characters include Carr's sister Gwendolen and the local librarian, Cecily; the action of the play, under the erratic control of the old Carr's fallible memory, continually mirrors that of Wilde's original. Carr has an exchange with Tristan Tzara reminiscent of John Worthing's exchanges with Algernon, Tzara has a scene with Joyce that draws on Jack's interview with Lady Bracknell, and Gwendolen and Cecily have a falling out on the lines of that of their namesakes in Wilde's play (though to the tune of "Mister Gallagher and Mister Shean" rather than in prose).

In 2016 the Irish actor/writers Helen Norton and Jonathan White wrote the comic play To Hell in a Handbag which retells the story of The Importance from the point of view of the characters Canon Chasuble and Miss Prism, giving them their own back story and showing what happens to them when they are not on stage in Wilde's play.

=== Radio and television ===
In 1925 the BBC broadcast a radio adaptation with Hesketh Pearson as Jack, Further broadcasts of the play followed during the 1920s and 1930s, and in November 1937 the BBC broadcast the first television adaptation of the play, in an abridged version directed by Royston Morley. In 1942 BBC radio broadcast scenes from the play, featuring two members of the original cast: the programme was introduced by Allan Aynesworth and starred Irene Vanbrugh as Lady Bracknell. A 1951 broadcast of the complete three-act play starred Gielgud, Evans and Gwen Ffrangcon-Davies.

In March 1958 British commercial television broadcast a production of the play starring Michael Denison (Jack), Tony Britton (Algernon), Dulcie Gray (Gwendolen) and Martita Hunt (Lady Bracknell). A 1964 commercial television adaptation starred Ian Carmichael, Patrick Macnee, Susannah York, Fenella Fielding, Pamela Brown and Irene Handl. A BBC television version in 1974 starred Coral Browne as Lady Bracknell. In 1977 BBC Radio 4 broadcast the four-act version of the play for the first time, with Fabia Drake as Lady Bracknell, Richard Pasco as Jack, Jeremy Clyde as Algy, Maurice Denham as Canon Chasuble, Sylvia Coleridge as Miss Prism, Barbara Leigh-Hunt as Gwendolen and Prunella Scales as Cecily. In 1988 a production of the four-act version was broadcast on BBC television, starring Joan Plowright, Paul McGann, Gemma Jones and Alec McCowen and directed by Stuart Burge.

In 1995, to mark the centenary of the first performance of the play, Radio 4 broadcast a new adaptation on 13 February; directed by Glyn Dearman, it featured Judi Dench as Lady Bracknell, Michael Sheen as Jack, Martin Clunes as Algernon, John Moffatt as Dr Chasuble, Miriam Margolyes as Miss Prism, Samantha Bond as Gwendolen and Amanda Root as Cecily. In December 2000 BBC Radio 3 broadcast an adaptation directed by Howard Davies starring Geraldine McEwan as Lady Bracknell, Simon Russell Beale as Jack Worthing, Julian Wadham as Algernon Moncrieff, Geoffrey Palmer as Canon Chasuble, Celia Imrie as Miss Prism, Victoria Hamilton as Gwendolen and Emma Fielding as Cecily.

=== Commercial recordings ===
Gielgud's BBC radio performance is preserved on an EMI audio recording dating from 1952, which also captures Edith Evans's Lady Bracknell. The cast also includes Culver (Algernon), Cadell (Miss Prism), Pamela Brown (Gwendolen) and Celia Johnson (Cecily).

Other audio recordings include a "Theatre Masterworks" version from 1953, directed and narrated by Margaret Webster, with a cast including Maurice Evans and Lucile Watson; a 1968 recording on the Caedmon label with Gladys Cooper as Lady Bracknell and Joan Greenwood, Richard Johnson, Alec McCowen, Lynn Redgrave, Irene Handl and Robertson Hare; a 1989 version by California Artists Radio Theatre, featuring Dan O'Herlihy, Jeanette Nolan, Les Tremayne and Richard Erdman; and one by L.A. Theatre Works issued in 2009, featuring Charles Busch, James Marsters and Andrea Bowen.

== Awards and nominations ==
=== Olivier Awards ===
In 2016, Suchet was nominated for Best Actor in a Supporting Role as Lady Bracknell. In 2025, The National Theatre production was nominated for Best Revival, and Clarke was nominated for Best Actress in a Supporting Role.

=== 1947 Broadway revival ===
Year	Award	Category	Nominee	Result
1948	Tony Award	Outstanding Foreign Company		Won

=== 1977 Broadway revival ===
Year	Award	Category	Nominee	Result
1978	Tony Award	Best Costume Design	Zack Brown	Nominated

=== 2011 Broadway revival ===
Year	Award	Category	Nominee	Result
2011	Tony Awards	Best Revival of a Play		Nominated
2011	Tony Awards	Best Actor in a Play	Brian Bedford	Nominated
2011	Tony Awards	Best Costume Design of a Play	Desmond Heeley	Nominated
2011	Drama Desk Award	Outstanding Revival of a Play		Nominated
2011	Drama Desk Award	Outstanding Featured Actor in a Play	Brian Bedford	Won
2011	Drama Desk Award	Outstanding Costume Design	Desmond Heeley	Won

== Notes, references and sources ==
=== Sources ===
==== Books ====
- Annan, Noel (1990). Our Age: Portrait of a Generation. London: Weidenfeld and Nicolson. ISBN 0-297-81129-0.
- Barranger, Milly S. (2004). Margaret Webster: A Life in the Theater. Ann Arbor: University of Michigan Press. ISBN 978-0-47-202603-6.
- Barry, Gerald (2013). The Importance of Being Earnest: Opera in Three Acts. Mainz: Schott. OCLC 828858722.
- Beckson, Karl E. (1970). Oscar Wilde: The Critical Heritage. London: Routledge. ISBN 978-0-7100-6929-0.
- Beckson, Karl E. (1998). The Oscar Wilde Encyclopedia. New York: AMS Press. ISBN 0-404-61498-1.
- Beerbohm, Max (1970). Last Theatres 1904–1910. London: Hart-Davis. OCLC 622626394.
- Bowker, Gordon (2012). James Joyce: A New Biography. New York: Farrar, Straus and Giroux. ISBN 978-0-37-417872-7.
- Bristow, Joseph (2008). Oscar Wilde and Modern Culture – The Making of a Legend. Athens, Ohio: Ohio University Press. ISBN 978-0-8214-1838-3.
- Cave, Richard (1997). "Wilde's Plays". In Peter Raby (ed.). The Cambridge Companion to Oscar Wilde. London: Cambridge University Press. ISBN 0-297-81129-0.
- Croall, Jonathan (2000). Gielgud: A Theatrical Life, 1904–2000. London: Methuen. ISBN 0-413-74560-0.
- D'Arch Smith, Timothy (1998). Bunbury: Two Notes on Oscar Wilde. Bicary: The Winged Lion. OCLC 41155817.
- Denisoff, Dennis (2001). Aestheticism and Sexual Parody, 1840–1940. Cambridge: Cambridge University Press. ISBN 0-521-02489-7.
- Dennis, Richard (2008). Cities in Modernity: Representations and Productions of Metropolitan Space, 1840–1930. Cambridge: Cambridge University Press. ISBN 978-0-521-46841-1.
- Ellmann, Richard (1988). Oscar Wilde. London: Penguin. ISBN 0-14-026501-5.
- Eltis, Sos (1996). Revising Wilde: Society and Subversion in the Plays of Oscar Wilde. Oxford: Clarendon Press. ISBN 0-19-812183-0.
- Ekwall, Eilert (1960). Concise Oxford Dictionary of English Place-names. Oxford: Oxford University Press. ISBN 0-19-869103-3.
- Gagnier, Regenia (1986). Idylls of the Marketplace: Oscar Wilde and the Victorian Public. Stanford: Stanford University Press. ISBN 0-85967-730-3.
- Gielgud, John (1979). An Actor and His Time. London: Sidgwick and Jackson. ISBN 0-283-98573-9.
- Gordon, Robert (1994). "Wilde's 'Plays of Modern Life' on the Contemporary British Stage". In Constantin-George Sandulescu (ed.). Rediscovering Oscar Wilde. Gerrards Cross: C. Smythe. ISBN 0-86140-376-2.
- Hall, Peter (1983). Diaries 1972–1980. London: Hamish Hamilton. ISBN 0-241-11285-0.
- Hayman, Ronald (1971). Gielgud. London: Heinemann. ISBN 0-435-18400-8.
- Hischak, Thomas S. (2009). Broadway Plays and Musicals: Descriptions and Essential Facts of More Than 14,000 Shows Through 2007. Jefferson: McFarland. ISBN 978-0-7864-5309-2.
- Hudson, Lynton (1951). The English Stage, 1850–1950. London: Harrap. OCLC 1851518.
- Jackson, Russell (1997). "The Importance of Being Earnest". In Peter Raby (ed.). The Cambridge Companion to Oscar Wilde. London: Cambridge University Press. ISBN 0-297-81129-0.
- Jackson, Russell (2000) [1980]. "Introduction". The Importance of Being Earnest. London: A & C Black. ISBN 0-7136-3040-X.
- Koerble, Betty (1952). W. S. Gilbert and Oscar Wilde: A Comparative Study. Madison: University of Wisconsin. OCLC 55806177.
- Lyttelton, George; Rupert Hart-Davis (1981). Rupert Hart-Davis (ed.). The Lyttelton–Hart-Davis Letters, Volume Three. London: John Murray. ISBN 0-7195-3770-3.
- Mason, Stuart (1972) [1917]. Bibliography of Oscar Wilde. New York: Haskell House. ISBN 0-8383-1378-7.
- Minney, R. J. (1976). The Films of Anthony Asquith. South Brunswick: A. S. Barnes. ISBN 0-498-01558-0.
- Nicholson, John Gambril (1892). Love in Earnest – Sonnets, Ballades, and Lyrics. London: Elliot Stock. OCLC 8575205.
- Pearson, Hesketh (1946). The Life of Oscar Wilde. London: Methuen and Co Ltd. OCLC 819025.
- Raby, Peter (1988). Oscar Wilde. Cambridge: Cambridge University Press. ISBN 978-0-521-26078-7.
- Raby, Peter (1995). The Importance of Being Earnest: A Reader's Companion. New York: Twayne. ISBN 0-8057-8588-4.
- Raby, Peter (1997). "Wilde's Comedies of Society". In Peter Raby (ed.). The Cambridge Companion to Oscar Wilde. London: Cambridge University Press. ISBN 0-297-81129-0.
- Ransome, Arthur (1912). Oscar Wilde: A Critical Study. New York: Mitchell Kennerly. OCLC 1050260305.
- Stedman, Jane W. (1996). W. S. Gilbert, A Classic Victorian & His Theatre. Oxford: Oxford University Press. ISBN 0-19-816174-3.
- Stoppard, Tom (2017) [1975]. Travesties (third ed.). London: Faber & Faber. ISBN 978-0-571-33925-9.
- Thomson, Peter (2006). The Cambridge Introduction to English Theatre, 1660–1900. Cambridge: Cambridge University Press. ISBN 0-521-54790-3.
- Wilde, Oscar (1962). Rupert Hart-Davis (ed.). The Letters of Oscar Wilde. London: Hart-Davis. OCLC 460734743.
- Wilde, Oscar (2000) [1980]. Russell Jackson (ed.). The Importance of Being Earnest. London: A & C Black. ISBN 0-7136-3040-X.
- Wilde, Oscar (2003). Merlin Holland (ed.). Oscar Wilde: A Life in Letters. London and New York: Fourth Estate. ISBN 0-00-716103-4.
- Williams, Carolyn (2012) [2010]. Gilbert and Sullivan – Gender, Genre, Parody. New York and Chichester: Columbia University Press. ISBN 978-0-231-14805-4.

==== Journals ====
- Adut, Ari (July 2005). "A Theory of Scandal: Victorians, Homosexuality, and the Fall of Oscar Wilde". American Journal of Sociology. 111 (1): 213–248. doi:10.1086/428816. JSTOR 10.1086/428816. PMID 16240549. (subscription required)
- Atkinson, Julia (July 2015). "An Author Not Just Now Familiar to Ears Polite". The Wildean, A Journal of the Oscar Wilde Society (47): 21–37. JSTOR 48569055. (subscription required)
- Craft, Christopher (Summer 1990). "Alias Bunbury: Desire and Termination in The Importance of Being Earnest". Representations (31): 19–46. doi:10.2307/2928398. JSTOR 2928398. (subscription required)
- Eaton, William (2014). "The Unsaid". Agni (79): 219–231. JSTOR 24582186. (subscription required)
- Fineman, Joel (1990). "The Significance of Literature: The Importance of Being Earnest". October. 15: 79–90. doi:10.2307/778454. JSTOR 778454. (subscription required)
- Fotheringham, Richard (2003). "Exiled to the Colonies: 'Oscar Wilde' in Australia, 1895–1897". Nineteenth Century Theatre and Film. 30 (2): 55–68. doi:10.7227/NCTF.30.2.4.
- Pablé, Adrian (2005). "The Importance of Renaming Ernest? Italian Translations of Oscar Wilde". Target. 17 (2): 297–326. doi:10.1075/target.17.2.05pab.
- Sedgwick, Eve Kosofsky (1993). "Tales of the Avunculate: Queer Tutelage in The Importance Of Being Earnest". Tendencies: 52–72. doi:10.2307/j.ctv11hpmxs.6. (subscription required)
- Snider, Clifton (July 2005). "Synchronicity and the Trickster in "The Importance of Being Earnest"". The Wildean (27): 55–63. JSTOR 45270141. (subscription required)
