= Beth Groundwater =

American novelist

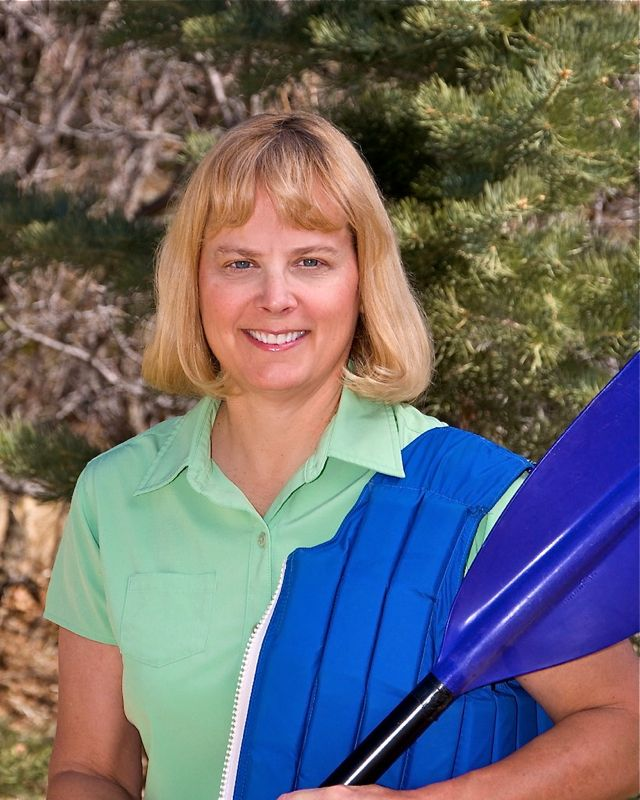
- Groundwater in Colorado Springs, Colorado in March 2010
- Education: College of William & Mary; Virginia Tech (MS)
- Occupation: Author
- Writing career
- Genre: Mystery fiction
- Website: bethgroundwater.com/Home.html

Beth Groundwater is an American author who has written three novels. Her first novel, A Real Basket Case, was nominated for the Best First Novel Agatha Award in 2007. She writes primarily in the Mystery genre, but has a published science fiction novella.

== Writing career ==
Groundwater first began writing fiction in the fifth grade, and in high school took an independent study in English. She went to the College of William & Mary and earned a degree in Psychology and Computer Science in 1978. She received a Master of Science degree in software engineering from Virginia Tech in 1983. She worked as a software engineer until 1999, then decided to become a writer.

After attending multiple writers' conventions, she began writing short stories. Seven were published before she met a literary agent who agreed to publish her first novel, A Real Basket Case. It was published in 2007, and was nominated for the Best First Novel Agatha Award in 2007. Of her short stories, nine have been published including one translated into Persian. Another of Groundwater's short stories has been adapted into a live theater performance. Her most recent short story, "Fatal Fish Flop," was published in Fish Tales, a 2011 mystery anthology.

== Awards and recognition ==
Groundwater's short stories have won several contests. Her short story "New Zealand" won first place in the 2003 PPW Paul Gillette Memorial Writing Contest, and was the winner of the Rocky Mountain Fiction Writers Short Story Anthology Contest. "Flamingo Fatality" won the Great Manhattan Mystery Conclave Short Story Anthology Contest in 2005, and her 2005 short story "Lucky Bear" placed first in the Storyteller Magazine Flash Fiction Contest.

Groundwater's first two novels have been award candidates. A Real Basket Case was nominated for the Best First Novel Agatha Award in 2007. To Hell in a Handbasket was a finalist in the Colorado Romance Writers' 2010 award category, Mainstream with Romantic Elements.

== Novels and novellas ==
=== Claire Hanover, Gift Basket Designer, mystery series ===
- A Real Basket Case (2007)
- To Hell in a Handbasket: A Claire Hanover, Gift Basket Designer, Mystery (2009)

=== Rocky Mountain Outdoor Adventures mystery series ===
- Deadly Currents (2011)
- Wicked Eddies (2012)

=== Other works ===
- The Epsilon Eridani Alternative (2009)
