= George Alexander (actor) =

English actor (1858–1918)

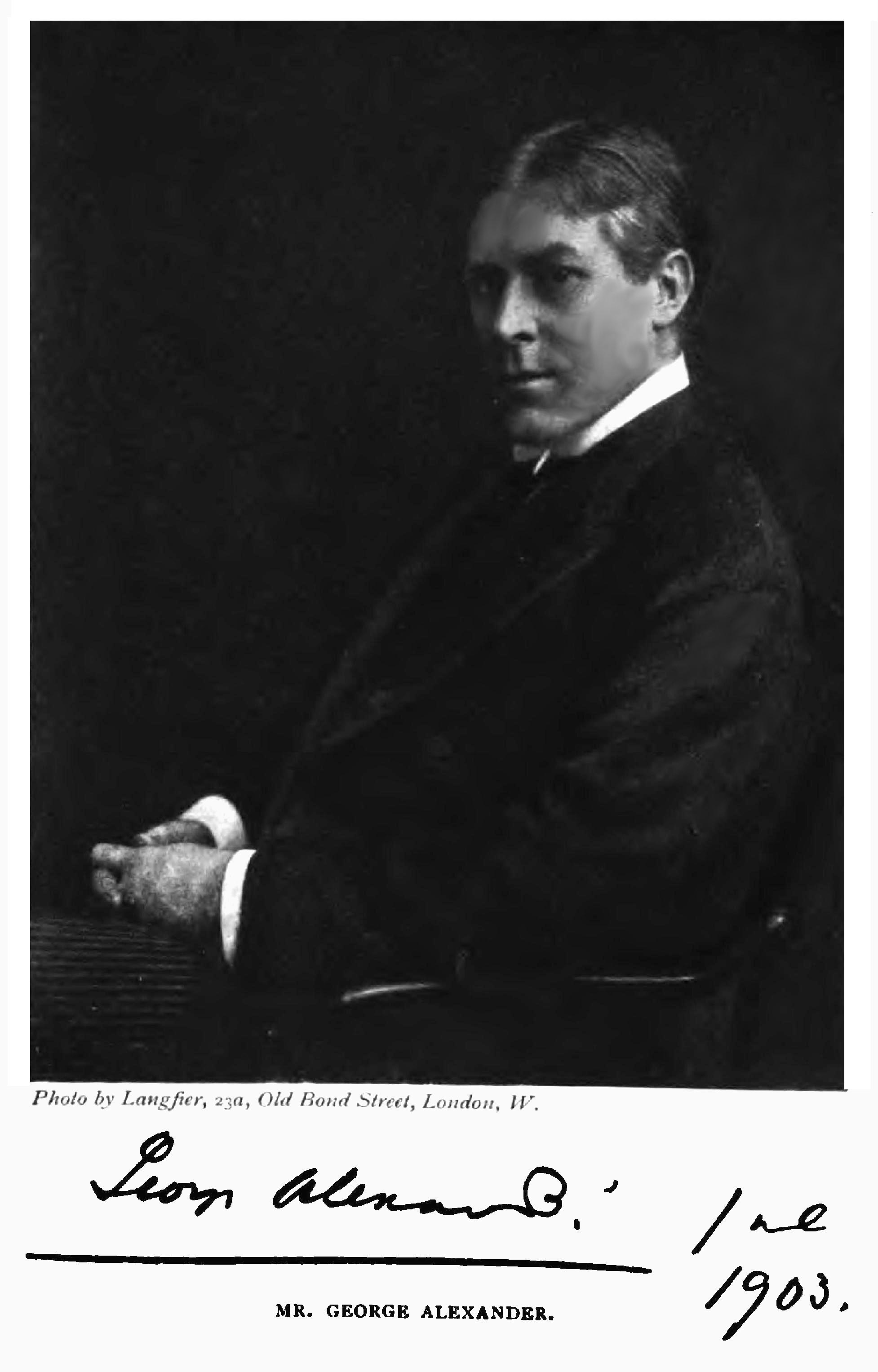
George Alexander by Louis Langfier 1903

Sir George Alexander (19 June 1858 – 15 March 1918), born George Alexander Gibb Samson, was an English stage actor, theatre producer and theatre manager. After acting on stage as an amateur he turned professional in 1879 and, over the next eleven years, he gained experience with leading producers and actor-managers, including Tom Robertson, Henry Irving and Madge and W. H. Kendal.

During this time, Alexander became interested in theatre management. In 1890 he took a lease on a London theatre and began producing on his own account. The following year, he moved to the St James's Theatre, where he remained, acting and producing, for the rest of his career. Among the most successful of the new plays he presented were Oscar Wilde's Lady Windermere's Fan (1892), A. W. Pinero's The Second Mrs Tanqueray (1893) and Wilde's The Importance of Being Earnest (1895).

Alexander followed Robertson and the Kendals in preferring a naturalistic style of writing and acting to the extravagantly theatrical manner favoured by some earlier actor-managers. He built around him a company of fine actors, many of whom were or later became leading figures in the profession, including Henry Ainley, Arthur Bourchier, Constance Collier, Julia Neilson, Fred Terry and Marion Terry. As an actor, Alexander's range was limited, and he did not attempt the great heroic roles or play much tragedy. His genre was naturalistic, and rarely very profound, comedy and drama, in which he was a recognised leader.

== Life and career ==
=== Early years ===
Alexander was born in Reading, Berkshire, the eldest son of William Murray Samson (c. 1827–1892), a Scottish commercial traveller, and his first wife, Mary Ann Hine, née Longman. He was educated at private schools in Clifton, Bristol, and at Ealing, London, and then at Stirling High School, which he left when he was fifteen. His father was strongly opposed to the theatre and intended a commercial career for his eldest son. Alexander was apprenticed as a clerk to a drapery firm in the City of London.

In his spare time Alexander began acting in amateur theatricals. On at least two occasions he appeared in amateur performances at the St James's Theatre, with which he was later to be professionally associated. In September 1879, aged 21, he abandoned commerce and became a professional actor, joining a repertory company at the Theatre Royal, Nottingham. Feeling the name "Samson" too redolent of scripture for an actor he adopted the stage name of George Alexander. After several roles in Nottingham he joined Tom Robertson's touring company for the 1879–1880 season, playing juvenile leads. He quickly began to attract favourable notices. The Era found his performances "all that could be desired" and "entitled to warm praise".

In April 1881 Alexander made his London, though not yet his West End, debut at the Standard Theatre, Shoreditch, as Freddy Butterscotch in Robert Reece's The Guv'nor, which he had already played in the provinces, winning excellent notices; in an early indication of his flair for publicity, he took advertising space in The Era to reprint the most laudatory. While he was playing the role in Birmingham, Henry Irving saw a performance and engaged him to play Caleb Deecie, the blind man, in a revival of the comedy The Two Roses at the Lyceum Theatre in London. In the next production, Irving cast him as Paris in Romeo and Juliet.

=== West End, 1880s ===
In August 1882 Alexander married Florence Jane Théleur (1857/8–1946), daughter of a French ballet master. They had no children. Florence shared with her husband not only his theatrical concerns but also his wider interest in public affairs. Later, after he became an actor-manager, she was a key figure in maintaining the company spirit and retaining the loyalty of actors and authors.

As Bassanio in The Merchant of Venice, 1885

During the 1880s Alexander broadened his theatrical experiences, mostly, but not exclusively, in London. At the Court Theatre in late 1882 he took over from Johnston Forbes-Robertson the role of the hero in the comedy The Parvenu. He played Shakespearian roles (Orlando, Romeo, Guiderius and Benedick) with Ellen Wallis's company. He joined the Kendals' company at the St James's, where his parts included de Riel in B. C. Stephenson's Impulse (1883) and Octave in Arthur Wing Pinero's The Ironmaster (1884).

In July 1884 Alexander rejoined Irving's company. The theatre historian J. P. Wearing writes that Alexander received "invaluable training from the acknowledged master of the profession", although Irving was not an easy man to work for:

Alexander found Irving's methods with his company extremely arduous and verging on the tyrannical: five or six hours of rehearsing with Irving often left him on the brink of tears. He vowed he would be much kinder to his own company when he ventured into management.

With Irving, Alexander visited the US twice, during the decade, in American tours (1884–1885 and 1887–1888). In Irving's company he progressed in a series of important supporting roles, such as Shakespeare's Orsino, Laertes, Bassanio and Macduff. In January 1886, having originally been cast as Valentin in W. G. Wills's Faust, he was promoted to the title role opposite Irving's Mephistopheles. Alexander played the part for 384 performances.

=== Actor-manager ===
The St James's Theatre in Alexander's time

Alexander (right) as Lord Windermere in Lady Windermere's Fan, 1892 (Note: Also in the group are, left to right, Ben Webster (Cecil Graham), Nutcombe Gould (Lord Darlington), Adolphus Vane-Tempest (Charles Dumby) and H. H. Vincent (Lord Augustus Lorton))

Alexander had been nurturing managerial ambitions for some time, and in 1890 he secured a lease of the Avenue Theatre. At the time, he was contractually obliged to remain in the cast of a long-running melodrama called London Day by Day at the Adelphi Theatre, and so was unable to appear in his own first production as a manager. This turned out to be a stroke of good fortune, because the play he mounted as a fill-in until he was able to act in his own productions was a farce, Dr Bill, which was immensely successful, running for seven months and making Alexander financially secure. During the run his Aldephi contract expired and he joined the cast of Dr Bill. When it closed he appeared in the play with which he had planned to open, Alphonse Daudet's Struggle for Life. It was well reviewed but was a box-office failure, and he later commented that if he had been free to open in it at the start of his managerial career, that career would have been in jeopardy. As it was, he was able to carry on even when his manager absconded with the theatre's cash box. At the end of his lease of the Avenue, Alexander obtained that of the St James's, to which he moved in November 1890, and remained there for the rest of his life.

Alexander had the theatre newly decorated and electric lighting installed. He opened with a double bill of comedies, Sunlight and Shadow and The Gay Lothario. He followed this with The Idler, by Haddon Chambers, a serious drama. It had already been a success in America and ran at the St James's through most of the remainder of the season, which concluded with a costume drama, Moliere, by Walter Frith, in which The Era considered that "Mr Alexander was not only good, but at certain moments great".

When Alexander took over the St James's he had only eleven years' professional experience in the theatre, but Wearing and the chronicler of the theatre A. E. W. Mason both note that he had already reached a firm and enduring managerial policy. He sought to engage the best actors for his company: unlike some star actor-managers he did not wish to be supported by actors whose inferior talent would make the star look better. He did not, in fact, wish to be seen as the star, and regarded himself as a team player. In addition to maintaining a London company, Alexander frequently assembled touring companies to play his successes in the provinces. Among those he engaged for his companies were Arthur Bourchier, Lilian Braithwaite, Constance Collier, Kate Cutler, Julia Neilson, Godfrey Tearle, Fred Terry and Marion Terry.

Like W. S. Gilbert, the Kendals and Bernard Shaw, Alexander was in favour of the naturalistic style of writing and acting propounded by Robertson. Other features of his management noted by Wearing were his continual support of British playwrights; (Note: Wearing notes that of the eighty-one productions presented by Alexander at the St James's, only eight were by foreign writers.) his concern for his employees; and his care to avoid alienating his key clientele, the fashionable society audience. The writer Hesketh Pearson commented that Alexander catered to the tastes and foibles of London Society in its theatre-going just as the Savoy Hotel catered to them in restaurant-going.

With Mrs Patrick Campbell in The Second Mrs Tanqueray, 1893

Within a year of taking over the St James's, Alexander began a mutually beneficial professional association with Oscar Wilde, whose Lady Windermere's Fan he presented in February 1892. As with many other of his playwrights, Alexander offered practical advice for making the play more stageable. His most important contribution to this play was to convince the reluctant Wilde that the most effective way of revealing the key plot point – that Mrs Erlynne is Lady Windermere's mother – would be to do so by degrees rather than in one melodramatic stroke in the final act.

Alexander's diplomatic skills enabled him to get on well with even the most temperamental authors and actors, but he was more comfortable with less volatile colleagues. One such was Pinero, whose play The Second Mrs Tanqueray Alexander presented in May 1893. Like Lady Windermere's Fan it featured "a woman with a past", but unlike Wilde's play it ended in tragedy. It was thought daring at the time, but Alexander knew his audiences and kept to what Pearson called his "safe path of correct riskiness". It ran for 227 performances in its first production and was later much revived. The title role was first played by Mrs Patrick Campbell, who made her name in the part. His acting style contrasted sharply with hers: she was extrovert and bold, whereas Alexander was understated and subtle. A contemporary profile commented that his range did not extend to parts requiring great dramatic power or tragic passion: "He is graceful in all that he does, but with an everyday humanity, the graceful, charming, well-bred, nicely-toned humanity proper to the drawing-rooms of Culture".

Between this and the play with which Alexander's name has become most closely associated – The Importance of Being Earnest – came Alexander's most conspicuous failure. The celebrated novelist Henry James had written a play, Guy Domville, about a hero who renounces the priesthood to save his family by marrying to produce an heir, but finally reverts to his religious calling. The play had been turned down by one London management, but Alexander took it on and opened it at the St James's on 5 January 1895. It was received politely by those in the more expensive parts of the house and impolitely by those in the cheaper seats. (Note: James wrote to his brother, "All the forces of civilization in the house waged a battle of the most gallant, prolonged & sustained applause with the hoots & jeers & catcalls of the roughs, whose roars (like those of a cage of beasts at some infernal 'Zoo') were only exacerbated (as it were!) by the conflict. It was a charming scene, as you may imagine, for a nervous, sensitive, exhausted author to face.) The reviews were unenthusiastic; Alexander kept the play on the bill for a month before turning to Wilde as a more theatrically adept writer.

=== The Importance of Being Earnest and aftermath ===
Allan Aynesworth as Algy (left) in the original production of The Importance of Being Earnest (1895) with Alexander as Jack

In a biographical essay published in 1922, Pearson expressed the view that Alexander would be remembered in the profession for being an ideal actor-manager, and by the public for taking the risk of introducing Wilde's plays and producing "the greatest farcical comedy in the English language". Unlike Shaw, who thought The Importance of Being Earnest "heartless ... hateful" and inferior to Wilde's other plays, Alexander recognised its merits from the outset. He once again advised Wilde about the text; his most important contribution was to convince the author that the second and third acts should be merged, with a substantial cut in the text. (Note: The original four-act text survived, and is occasionally performed. The cut scene has a solicitor called Gribsby who comes to serve a writ on Ernest Worthing (the alias adopted by both John Worthing and Algernon Moncrieff) for unpaid bills at the Savoy Hotel restaurant. Alexander did not like the idea of an extra character who appeared only in one short scene.)

The success of the play with audiences and critics was immediate and considerable, but it was short-lived. Within weeks of the premiere Wilde was arrested on a charge of committing homosexual acts and was tried, convicted and imprisoned. The public turned against him, and although Alexander tried to keep the production of the play going by removing the author's name from the playbills the day after the arrest, he had to withdraw the play after 83 performances. He further disappointed Wilde by declining to stand bail for him, and later, after Wilde's release from prison, failing to stop to talk to him when they passed in the street. Nevertheless he voluntarily paid Wilde a monthly sum for the rest of the latter's life, (Note: £20 a month, the equivalent in 2017 values of about £8,000 using the "labour earnings" comparator of the Measuring Worth website.) and bequeathed the rights in Lady Windermere's Fan and The Importance of Being Earnest to Wilde's son, Vyvyan Holland. Wearing observes that, later in 1895, Alexander himself was touched by sexual scandal, when he was arrested for soliciting a prostitute. Alexander maintained that the young woman was a beggar to whom he had charitably given a coin, and the case was dismissed.

The play chosen to fill the gap left by the withdrawal of The Importance was The Triumph of the Philistines by Henry Arthur Jones. Alexander had earlier presented Jones's The Masqueraders (1894) with some success, but the new play, a satire of small-town narrow-mindedness, received mixed reviews and quickly closed; Alexander fell back on revivals, including The Second Mrs Tanqueray (without Mrs Patrick Campbell). In two productions during 1896 Alexander and his company moved temporarily away from drawing-room comedy and society drama, first with the Ruritanian swashbuckler, The Prisoner of Zenda, which ran for 255 performances; and at the end of the year a rare venture into Shakespeare, in As You Like It, with Alexander as Orlando, Julia Neilson as Rosalind and a supporting cast that included C. Aubrey Smith, Bertram Wallis, H. B. Irving, Robert Loraine and H. V. Esmond. At the end of 1899 Alexander closed the theatre to have it largely reconstructed, producing what The Era called "one of the handsomest temples of the drama in London", while retaining its charm and cosiness.

=== 20th century ===
The young poet Stephen Phillips furnished Alexander with a verse drama, Paolo and Francesca, based on an episode in Dante's The Divine Comedy, produced at the St James's in March 1902. Alexander played the fierce and sombre Giovanni Malatesta, a part far removed from his more usual urbane roles; the young Henry Ainley and Evelyn Millard were well received as the eponymous lovers, and the play ran for 134 performances. In February 1906 Alexander presented and appeared in Pinero's new drama His House in Order, which was an artistic and box-office success, running for 427 performances. Wearing comments that Alexander was a leader of fashion, starting a trend in men's attire by appearing in this play wearing a soft-collared shirt with a lounge suit.

Caricature of Alexander by Max Beerbohm, 1909

Alexander had the distinction of giving command performances for three successive British monarchs. Having appeared in Carton's Liberty Hall at Balmoral before Queen Victoria, the final command performance of her reign, he appeared before Edward VII, as Edward Thursfield in Alfred Sutro's The Builder of Bridges at Sandringham on 4 December 1908. And on 17 May 1911 in a royal command performance for George V, he played Alfred Evelyn in Edward Bulwer-Lytton's Money in an all-star production at the Drury Lane, in which Alexander and Sir Herbert Tree were held to have carried off the honours. (Note: The cast also included Fred Terry, Sir Charles Wyndham, Charles Hawtrey, Weedon Grossmith, Dion Boucicault, Sir John Hare and Irene Vanbrugh.)

Alexander was knighted in 1911 and received an honorary LLD from the University of Bristol the following year.

From 1907 to 1913, Alexander represented the South St Pancras division for the Municipal Reform Party on the London County Council and served conscientiously on several of its committees. He told an interviewer: "I have no political ax to grind. ... I go on the council, if elected, to serve London municipally, not politically." He did not seek re-election in 1913: if his health had permitted he would, in Wearing's view, have stood for Parliament. He was an astute and capable committee man, giving substantial amounts of time to the Actors' Benevolent Fund, the Royal General Theatrical Fund, the Actors' Association and the Actresses' Franchise League. He was a key organiser of the Coronation Gala Performance in 1911 and the Shakespeare tercentenary celebration at Drury Lane in 1916. When the First World War broke out in 1914 Alexander's health was in decline, but as well as continuing to appear at the St James's he worked for charities including the Red Cross, the League of Mercy and the Order of St John of Jerusalem, organising fund-raising performances, fêtes and garden parties.

Alexander died of tuberculosis and diabetes at his country home, Little Court, Chorleywood, Hertfordshire on 16 March 1918, at the age of 59. He was buried at Christ Church Cemetery in Chorleywood four days later. A memorial service was held at Holy Trinity, Sloane Street, in London on 22 March, attended by a large congregation, mainly comprising the theatrical profession and British society. A blue plaque unveiled in 1951 commemorates Alexander at his London house, 57 Pont Street, Chelsea.

== Notes, references and sources ==
=== Sources ===
- Mason, A. E. W. (1935). Sir George Alexander and the St James' Theatre. London: Macmillan. OCLC 869837482.
- Morley, Sheridan (1976). Oscar Wilde. London: Weidenfeld and Nicolson. ISBN 978-0-297-77160-9.
- Parker, John, ed. (1925). Who's Who in the Theatre (fifth ed.). London: Sir Isaac Pitman and Sons. OCLC 10013159.
- Pearson, Hesketh (1922). Modern Men and Mummers. New York: Harcourt, Brace. OCLC 474214741.
- Sutherland, Lucie (2020). George Alexander and the work of the actor-manager. Cham, Switzerland. ISBN 978-3-030-40935-7. OCLC 1164582654.
- Wilson, George (2016). 'Resting Places: The Burial Sites of More Than 14000 Famous Persons (3rd ed.). Mcfarland. ISBN 978-0-786-47992-4.
- Woollard, John; Willis, Alan (2000). Twentieth Century Local Election Results. Volume 1: Election Results for the London County Council 1889–1961 and for the London Metropolitan Boroughs 1900–1928 (PDF). Elections Centre.
