= Evelyn Millard =

English Shakespearean actress (1869–1941)

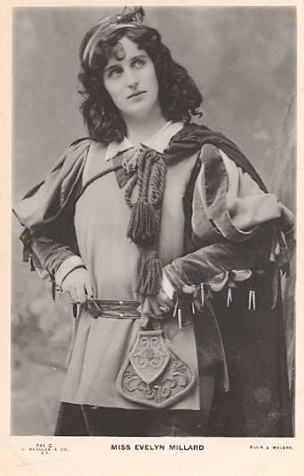
Evelyn Millard as Lady Marian in Robin Hood (1906)

Evelyn Mary Millard (18 September 1869 – 9 March 1941) was an English Shakespearean actress, actor-manager and "stage beauty" of the late nineteenth and early twentieth centuries perhaps best known for creating the role of Cecily Cardew in the 1895 premiere of Oscar Wilde's play The Importance of Being Earnest.

== Early life and career ==
Allan Aynesworth, Evelyn Millard, Irene Vanbrugh and George Alexander in the 1895 London premiere of The Importance of Being Earnest

Millard was born in Kensington in London in 1869, one of three daughters of John Millard (1838 –1900), a teacher of elocution at the Royal Academy of Music and the Royal College of Music, and his wife, Emily (née Cooke) (1848–1902). Evelyn Millard studied at the Female School of Art in Bloomsbury. She made her first stage appearance in 1891 in a "walk-on" role in Henry Arthur Jones' play The Dancing Girl at the Haymarket Theatre in London. She trained as an actress under Sarah Thorne at her School of Acting based at the Theatre Royal in Margate, where she learnt "voice production, gesture and mime, dialects and accents, make-up, the portrayal of characters, the value of pace and the value of pauses". For Thorne she played Julia in The Hunchback, Juliet in Romeo and Juliet and Hero in Much Ado About Nothing. She then joined Thomas Thorne's company, and toured in the plays Joseph's Sweetheart, Miss Tomboy, Sophia and Money. Millard then spent almost two years at the Adelphi Theatre in London.

In 1894 Millard toured with George Alexander, for whom she played Rosamund in Sowing the Wind, Dulcie in The Masqueraders and Paula in The Second Mrs Tanqueray; she also played the latter role at the St James's Theatre. At this theatre she created the role of Cecily Cardew in the 1895 premiere of Oscar Wilde's The Importance of Being Earnest. In September 1895 Millard appeared before Queen Victoria in a Royal Command Performance of Liberty Hall at Balmoral.

From January 1896 she played Princess Flavia in the London premiere of the play The Prisoner of Zenda. In 1897 Millard joined the theatrical company of Herbert Beerbohm Tree and played Portia in Julius Caesar in 1898 at Her Majesty's Theatre in London.

For the American theatrical manager Charles Frohman, she played Lady Ursula in The Adventure of Lady Ursula at the Duke of York's Theatre in 1898, the title role in Jerome K. Jerome's Miss Hobbs, both of which ran for over 200 performances, and Cho-Cho-San in the London premiere of David Belasco's play Madame Butterfly, which opened on 28 April 1900 at the Duke of York's Theatre and which ran for sixty-eight performances. The cast included Allan Aynesworth, Claude Gillingwater and J. C. Buckstone. This production was seen by the composer Giacomo Puccini, who is said to have based his opera Madama Butterfly on it.

== Later years ==
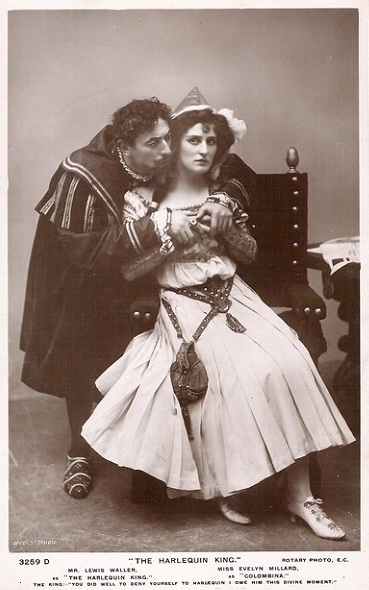
Millard with Lewis Waller in The Harlequin King (1906)

On 19 July 1900 Millard married Robert Porter Coulter (1862–1915) at St. George's church in Hanover Square in London. A partner in the clothing firm of Scotch House, in 1910 he was declared bankrupt. Their daughter Ursula Helen Coulter (1901–1991) was named after the character Millard was playing in The Adventure of Lady Ursula when she met Coulter in 1898. In March 1902 Millard returned to the stage at the St James's Theatre to play Francesca in Paolo and Francesca. She appeared in two further Royal Command Performances at Windsor Castle before Edward VII; in November 1904 she appeared as Lady Mary Carlyle in Monsieur Beaucaire opposite Lewis Waller, and in November 1906 as Lady Marian in Robin Hood.

Millard then played in a number of Shakespearean roles, including Jessica in The Merchant of Venice in 1903, Juliet in Romeo and Juliet in 1905, and Desdemona in Waller's 1906 production of Othello. Also in 1906 she appeared with Lewis Waller in The Harlequin King at the Imperial Theatre. Millard formed her own theatrical company as actor-manager in 1908, and played Olivia in Twelfth Night in 1912 at the Savoy Theatre in London, directed by Harley Granville Barker. She also played Edith Dombey in Dombey and Son and Agnes in David Copperfield, among others. Millard reprised the role of Cho-Cho-San in Madame Butterfly at the Palace Theatre of Varieties in London in 1911.

Millard's last major role was as Agnes Wickfield in David Copperfield at His Majesty's Theatre in December 1914. Her last known role was a brief appearance as Calpurnia in Julius Caesar during the Shakespeare Tercentenary Celebration at Stratford-upon-Avon in 1916.

Following her retirement Millard lived in Abingdon Court in Kensington where she died on 9 March 1941 aged 70.

== Gallery ==
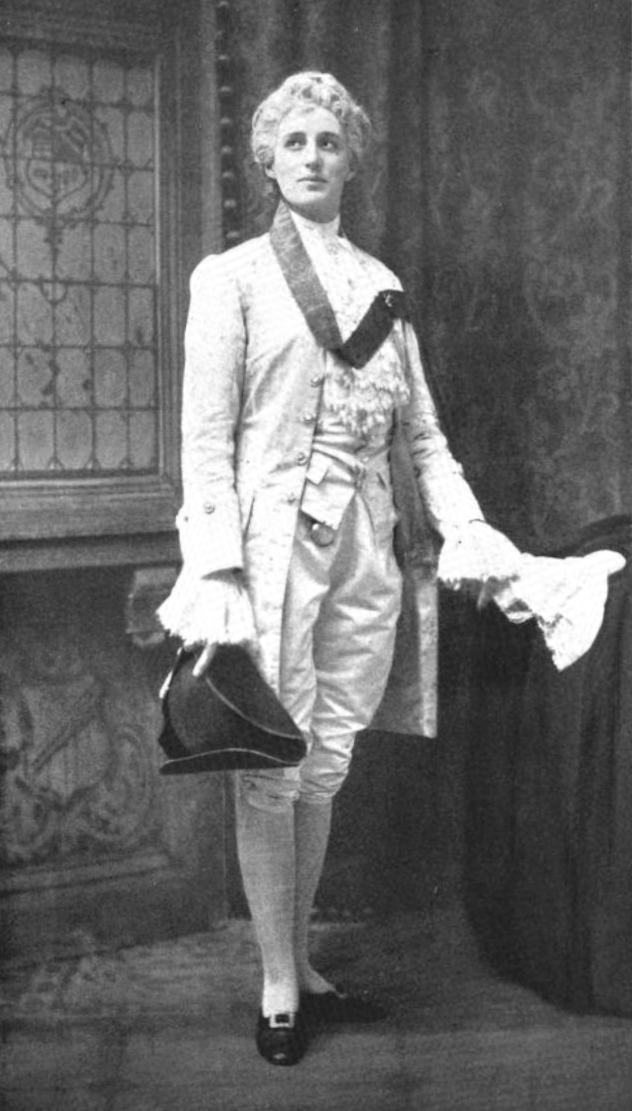
Millard as Ursula Barrington in The Adventure of Lady Ursula (1898)

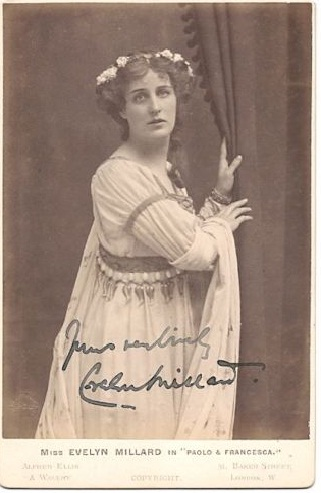
Millard in Paolo and Francesca (1902)

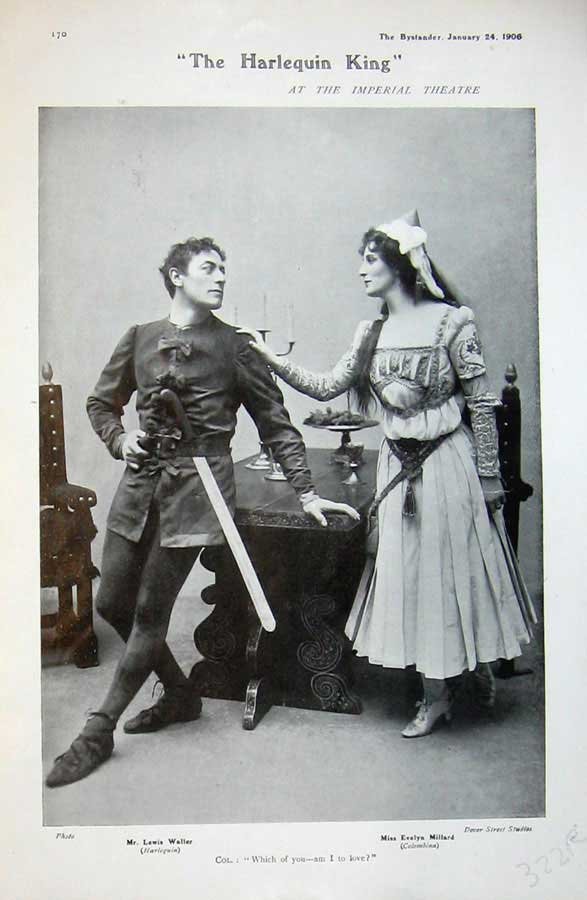
Millard with Lewis Waller in The Harlequin King (1906)

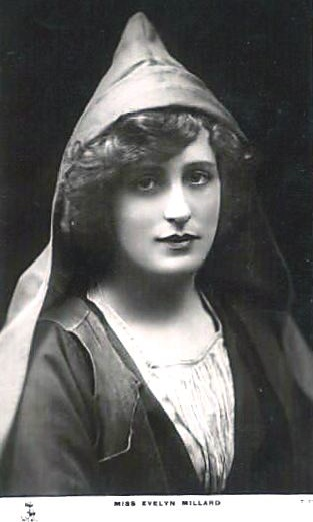
Millard as Maid Marian in Robin Hood (1906)
