= Allan Aynesworth =

English actor and producer (1864–1959)

Aynesworth circa 1890

Edward Henry Abbot-Anderson (14 April 1864, Sandhurst, Berkshire – 22 August 1959, Camberley, Surrey), known professionally as Allan Aynesworth, was an English actor and producer. His career spanned more than six decades, from 1887 to 1949, and included the role of Algernon Moncrieff in the 1895 premiere of Oscar Wilde's The Importance of Being Earnest.

Aynesworth generally appeared in drawing room comedy and contemporary high-society dramas, usually avoiding old classics and modern plays about social problems. He retired from the stage in 1938, and made his final acting appearance in the film The Last Days of Dolwyn in 1949.

== Life and career ==
=== Early years ===
Aynesworth was born at the Royal Military College, Sandhurst, the third son of Major-General Edward Abbot-Anderson and his first wife, Martha, née Birkett, who died the day after Aynesworth was born. The eldest son, John Henry, followed his father into the army, and rose to be a Brigadier-General; the middle son, William Maurice, entered the medical profession and became physician to the Princess Royal. Aynesworth attended Chatham House Grammar School, and was then sent to France and Germany to complete his education. While in France he became an habitué of the Comédie-Française, where he studied the techniques of French acting. The Times said of this period in his life:

His determination to be first rate, his respect for acting as an art, his insistence on clarity of diction and intimate timing, his reluctance to undertake parts to which he felt he could not do justice, not least his panache – all this could be traced to the influence of the French theatre on him in his formative years.

After returning to England, Aynesworth resolved to pursue a theatrical career, and made his stage debut in April 1887 as an uncredited extra in The Red Lamp by Outram Tristram, produced by and starring Herbert Beerbohm Tree. He then went as a student to Sarah Thorne's theatre at Margate, before returning to London in November 1887, when he played a small role in a blank-verse tragedy, The Witch, at the St James's Theatre. The Standard observed, "Mr. A. E. Aynesworth spoke the few lines allotted to him with distinction". In March 1888 Aynesworth played in a short-lived piece, To the Death, written by and starring Rutland Barrington. before rejoining the company at the St James's the following month, under the management of John Hare and William Kendal; he played General de Pontac in a revival of The Ironmaster by Arthur Pinero. Later that year the Hare and Kendal management ended, and Barrington took over as lessee of the St James's; he cast Aynesworth as Lord Ashwell in The Dean's Daughter. Reviewers thought it a difficult role – "trying", "ungrateful and generally ridiculous" – and singled Aynesworth out for his success in making it work on stage.

=== 1890s ===
Aynesworth, left, with George Alexander in the original production of The Importance of Being Earnest, 1895

During 1890–1892 Aynesworth played a series of roles at the Court Theatre: George Liptott in The Weaker Sex; Lord St John Brompton in Aunt Jack; the Hon Brooke Twombley in The Cabinet Minister; the Hon Gilbert Stukeley in The Volcano; and Richard Webb in The Late Lamented.

After appearing at the Avenue, Globe, Criterion, Daly's and Garrick Theatres, during 1883–1884, Aynesworth joined George Alexander's company at the St James's, where he played Algernon Moncrieff in the first production of The Importance of Being Earnest. He recalled that Wilde attended only one rehearsal, and then called the cast together and told them that he had just witnessed "a play that reminded him slightly of one that he'd written", but that the similarity ended there. Despite the author's reservations, the play was enthusiastically received when it opened on 14 February 1895. Looking back in the 1940s, Aynesworth told the journalist and biographer Hesketh Pearson, "In my fifty-three years of acting, I never remember a greater triumph than [that] first night." The role of Algernon brought him to wider public notice than before, and his notices were excellent: "Mr Aynesworth hits off to perfection the bland effrontery of Moncrieff"; "[he] catches the right vein of grave extravagance";"exactly catches the tone of well-bred insolence which harmonises best with the author's wit".

Later in 1895 Alexander led the St James's company on tour, and in September they played a command performance of the comedy-drama Liberty Hall for Queen Victoria at Balmoral Castle. During the rest of the decade Aynesworth appeared at seven London theatres, mostly in society dramas and drawing room comedies, but venturing into Ruritanian romance in an 1896 adaptation of The Prisoner of Zenda. Later in his career he returned to this play, no longer in a juvenile role but as the fatherly Colonel Sapt.

=== 1900 to 1920 ===
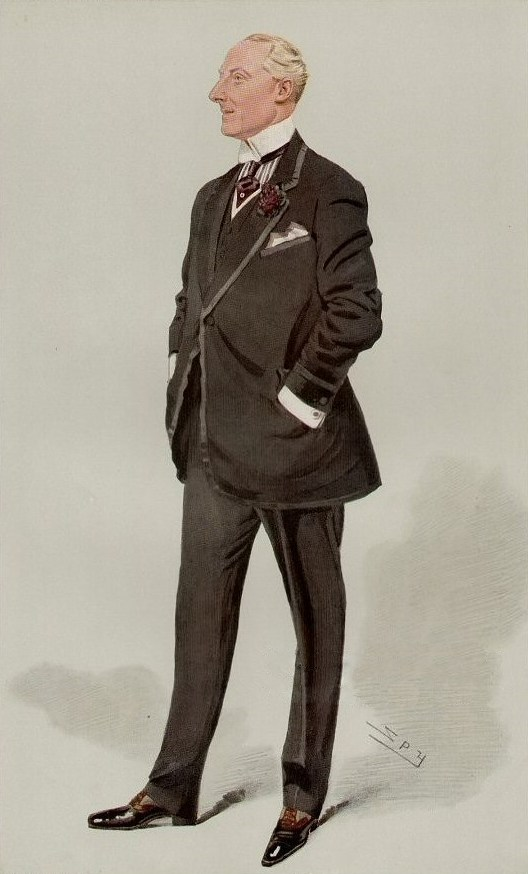
"Tony", caricature by Spy in Vanity Fair, 1908

Aynesworth began the 1900s playing Lieutenant B. F. Pinkerton in Madame Butterfly, David Belasco's play, which was five years away from becoming much better known in Giacomo Puccini's operatic version. In 1903 he made one of his few appearances in a costume drama, playing Sir John Melville in the 18th-century comedy The Clandestine Marriage. From 1903 to 1907 he established a fruitful stage partnership with Marie Tempest in a series of long-running plays, mostly at the Comedy Theatre, but with one excursion to New York to play The Freedom of Suzanne at the Empire Theatre.

At the Duke of York's Theatre in February 1912 Aynesworth appeared as Captain Nicholas Jeyes in Pinero's The "Mind the Paint" Girl, after which he went into management for the first time, presenting and starring in Ready Money at the New Theatre, which ran for more than 200 performances. He continued his career as an actor-manager over the next few years at the Garrick Theatre, and, in partnership with Bronson Albery, the Criterion, and then, with Irving Albery, the Prince of Wales Theatre.

During the First World War theatres were asked to keep open to provide entertainment for troops home on leave. Aynesworth complied, and was in demand as actor, producer and contributor to charity performances.

=== Later years ===
With Lottie Venne in The Circle, 1921

In 1921 Aynesworth had one of his biggest successes, in the role of Lord Porteus in Somerset Maugham's The Circle. The Times said that those who saw him would not forget "the rotund perfection of his performance", and The Play Pictorial commented:

It is Mr Allan Aynesworth's rendering of the part which will cause the play to linger with pleasant memories in my mind. It is one of the most admirable pieces of character-acting that has been seen on the boards of the Haymarket Theatre since the days it was tenanted by the late Sir Herbert Tree. It was worthy of Tree. It was a perfect "make-up", and the manner and mannerisms were inimitable – a genuine example of comedy acting".

The following year Aynesworth had another characteristic success in The Dover Road by A. A. Milne, playing "the tremendous butler, Dominic ... an unbelievably grand creature". The Play Pictorial praised "a masterly study of humorous exposition, and every effect is obtained without apparent effort".

In the 1930s Aynesworth continued to appear in West End plays. His Lord Porteus attracted enthusiastic reviews when The Circle was revived in 1931. He maintained a keen interest on the doings of a new generation of actors. Asked by an interviewer in 1937 who he thought were the "real thing" among the younger actors, he replied, "that young fellow who played Hamlet – Gielgud – yes, he's certainly the real thing; and that other boy ... Laurence Olivier, and the little girl who's played some Shakespeare, Margaretta Scott". When Gielgud produced and starred in The Importance of Being Earnest in 1938 he and his colleagues were delighted and encouraged when Aynesworth came backstage after the first night and told them he found the production delightful, catching the original gaiety and "exactly the right atmosphere".

Aynesworth's last stage role was Lord Conyngham in Laurence Housman's Victoria Regina. The Times commented "it is the wit and authority of Mr Allan Aynesworth's Conyngham that here makes all else seem a trifle amateurish", The play ran for 337 performances, after which Aynesworth retired from theatre performance. His final role was on film, as the elderly Lord Lancaster in The Last Days of Dolwyn (1949). The Times summed up his career:

He acted in 25 London theatres, most frequently at the Haymarket and the St. James's; and he took part in plays written by over 50 contemporary dramatists. He never appeared in anything by Shaw (though for a while he rehearsed a part in You Never Can Tell) or Granville Barker, for his interest was centred in the comedy of character and he was not sympathetic to the drama of ideas. His favourite part was Charles Surface, which gives a nice indication of his general outlook. He had worked with almost every eminent actor and actress of his day, and appeared before Queen Victoria, King Edward VII and Queen Alexandra, King George V and Queen Mary, and King George VI and Queen Elizabeth.

Aynesworth died at his home in Camberley at the age of 95.

== Films ==
- The Game of Life (1922) as John
- Flames of Passion (1922) as Mr. Forbes
- Brown Sugar (1931) as Lord Knightsbridge
- The Calendar (1931) as Edmund Garth
- Just Smith (1933) as Lord Trench
- Love, Life and Laughter (1934) as King Boris
- Little Friend (1934) as Col. Amberley
- The Iron Duke (1934) (with George Arliss) as Louis XVIII
- Brewster's Millions (1935) (with Jack Buchanan and Lili Damita) as Rawles
- I, Claudius (1937) as Asiatacus, Senator
- Young Man's Fancy (1939) as Mr. Trubshaw
- The Last Days of Dolwyn (1949) (with Edith Evans, Emlyn Williams and Richard Burton) as Lord Lancashire (final film role)

== References and sources ==
=== Sources ===
- Croall, Jonathan (2011). John Gielgud – Matinee Idol to Movie Star. London: Methuen. ISBN 978-1-4081-3106-0.
- Parker, John, ed. (1925). Who's Who in the Theatre (fifth ed.). London: Sir Isaac Pitman and Sons. OCLC 10013159.
- Pearson, Hesketh (1946). The Life of Oscar Wilde. London: Methuen. OCLC 1071065128.
