= To hell in a handbasket =

English figure of speech

"Going to hell in a handbasket", "going to hell in a handcart", "going to hell in a handbag", "go to hell in a bucket", "sending something to hell in a handbasket" and "something being like hell in a handbasket" are variations on an allegorical locution of unclear origin, which describes a situation headed for disaster inescapably or precipitately.

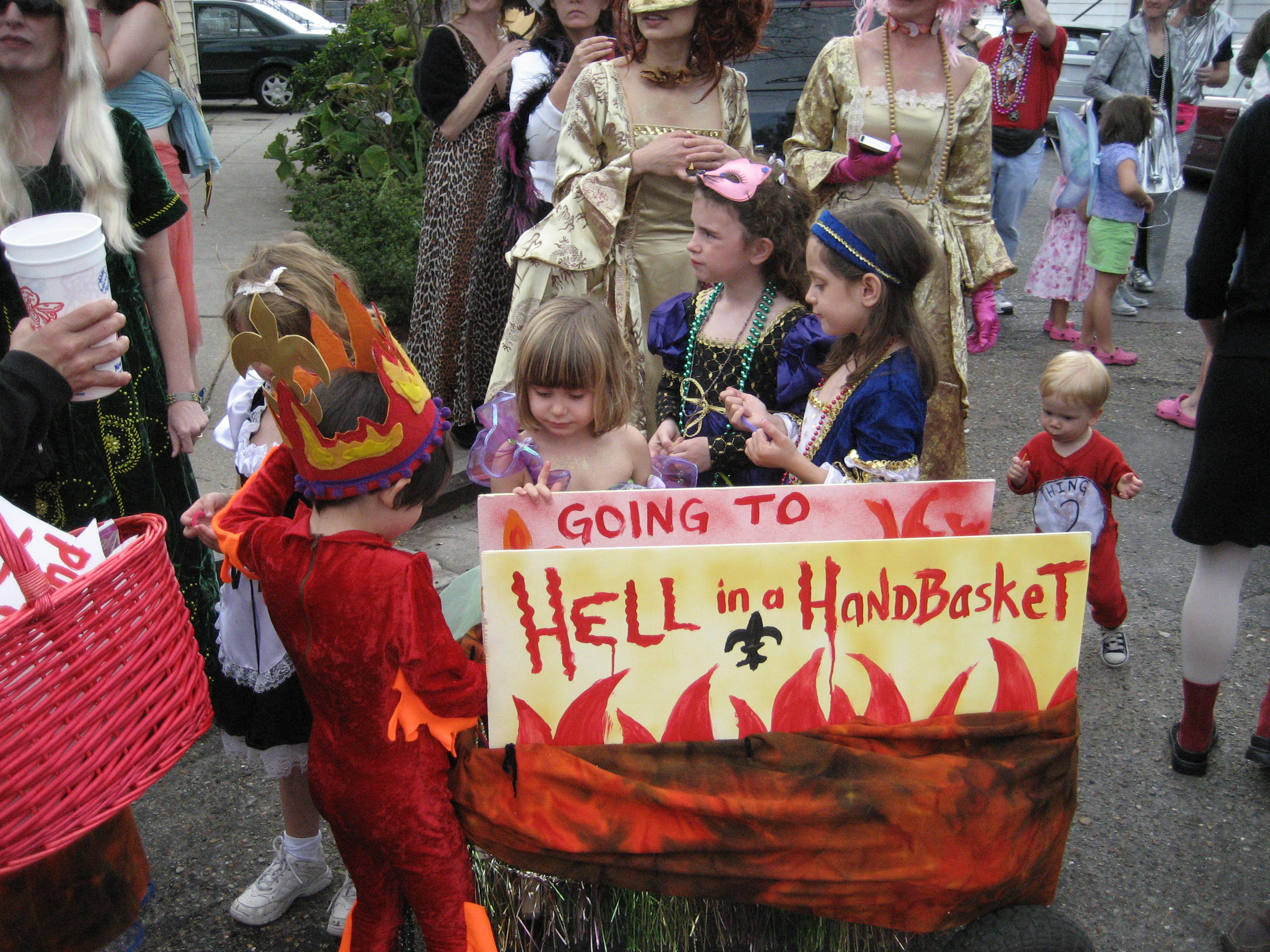
New Orleans Mardi Gras day: wagon decorated as mini-float "Going to Hell in a Handbasket" with costume-wearing children

== Possible origins ==
The origin of the phrase has been much debated. Its usage may be dated to the baskets used to catch guillotined heads in the eighteenth century. Early visualizations of the phrase might possibly be associated with religious iconography, such as the stained glass windows of Fairford Church in Gloucestershire and Hieronymus Bosch's 1515 painting The Haywain, which portrays a large cart of hay being drawn by "infernal beings that drag everyone to Hell".

=== 19th century usages ===
In the 19th century, the phrase has been found associated with the California gold rush of the 1840s, where men were lowered by hand in baskets down mining shafts to set explosives which could have deadly consequences.

The phrase was used in both American and British newspapers as early as 1841. Elbridge Gerry Paige, a New York City journalist used the phrase in one of his humorous Short Patent Sermons: "[Those people] who would rather ride to hell in a hand-cart than walk to heaven supported by the staff of industry". On the other side of the Atlantic, Irish politician and publisher Feargus O'Connor warned workers in his newspaper Northern Star: "Sanctified hypocrites will tell you not, and that, do what you will, you are all to go to hell in a handbasket, thereby, in fact, making you mere passive creatures in this world— passive to their will..."

In 1862, the journal Weekly Pacquet of Advice from Rome: or, The History of Popery stated: "...that noise of a Popish Plot was nothing in the world but an intrigue of the Whigs to destroy the Kings best Friends, and the Devil fetch me to Hell in a Hand basket, if I might have my will, there should not be one Fanatical Dog left alive in the three Kingdoms."

I. Winslow Ayer's 1865 polemic alleges, "Judge Morris of the Circuit Court of Illinois at an August meeting of Order of the Sons of Liberty said: "Thousands of our best men were prisoners in Camp Douglas, and if once at liberty would 'send abolitionists to hell in a hand basket.'"

== See also ==
- To Hell in a Handbag, a play by Helen Norton and Jonathan White.
- Hell in a Handbasket, a Meat Loaf album.
- To Hell in a Handcart, a dystopian novel by English journalist Richard Littlejohn.
