= The Circle (play) =

Play by W. Somerset Maugham

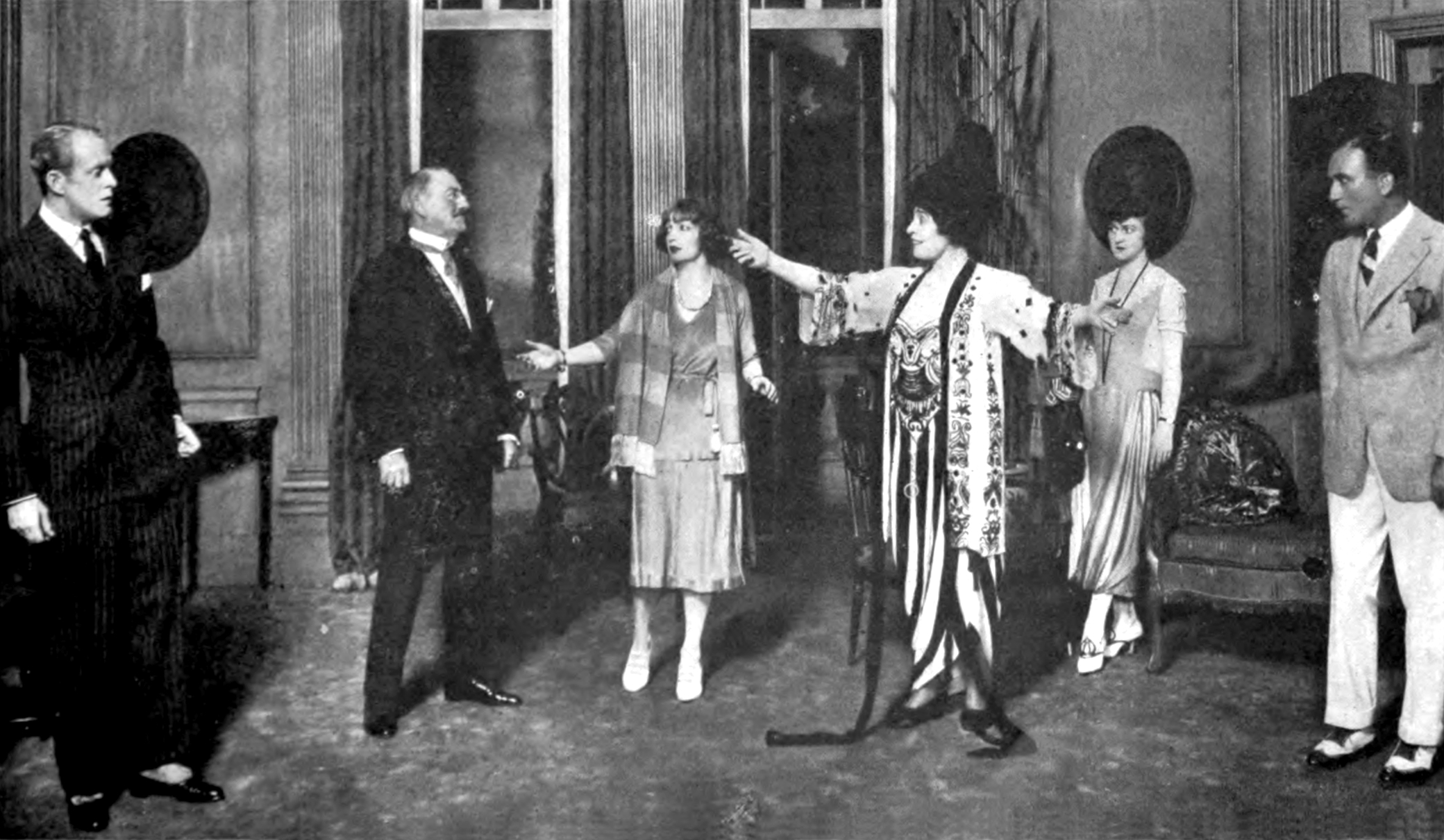
1921 Broadway cast, L-R: Robert Rendel, John Drew, Estelle Winwood, Mrs. Leslie Carter, Maxine MacDonald, and John Halliday

The Circle: a Comedy in Three Acts is a play by W. Somerset Maugham. It was first produced at the Haymarket Theatre, London on 3 March 1921, and has been revived several times in the West End and on Broadway.

The play, which caused some outrage among a small minority of playgoers at the time of the premiere, depicts a young married woman contemplating leaving her husband for another man, and looking to an elderly peer and his partner, who eloped thirty years earlier, for advice.

== Original cast ==
Sketches of the first production: top Leon Quartermaine and Fay Compton; bottom Lottie Venne and Allan Aynesworth

- Lord Porteus – Allan Aynesworth
- Clive Champion-Cheney – E. Holman Clark
- Arnold Champion-Cheney, MP (Clive's son, a man of about thirty-five) – Ernest Thesiger
- Edward Luton (a planter in the Federated Malay States) – Leon Quartermaine
- Lady Catherine Champion-Cheney (Arnold's mother) – Lottie Venne
- Mrs Shenstone – Toni Edgar-Bruce
- Elizabeth Champion-Cheney (Arnold's wife) – Fay Compton

Source: The Times.

== Plot ==
The action of the play takes place over a single day at Aston-Adey, Arnold Champion-Cheney's country house in Dorset.

At the beginning of the play, the prim Arnold is dreading the first visit of his mother, Lady Catherine Champion-Cheney, and her partner, Lord Porteus. She had caused scandal by eloping with Porteus thirty years earlier, leaving her husband and only child. Arnold's wife, Elizabeth, is looking forward to meeting Catherine, whom she sees as a romantic figure for sacrificing her social position in England for love. In reality the older couple are not romantic figures: Catherine hates being rejected by polite society, dresses and makes up too young for her years, "a ridiculous caricature of a pretty woman grown old", and regards her partner as "simply a testy, crotchety old gentleman who makes himself a nuisance at the bridge table". Nonetheless, they remain bound together by reluctant affection. Their visit is complicated by the unexpected arrival of Arnold's father, the deserted Clive Champion-Cheney, but he is quite friendly to the couple.

Elizabeth is tempted to repeat history by eloping with Edward Luton, a friend of her husband, aware that in doing so she would be sacrificing a comfortable life in England for the probable hardships of life as a planter's wife in Malaya. Arnold, to whom she confesses her emotions, gives her his blessing to leave him if she wishes. This calculated ploy, suggested to him by his father, makes her feel so guilty that she almost resolves to end her relationship with Edward, but the latter tells her candidly that he offers her love and not necessarily happiness. This decides her in his favour, and Porteus and Lady Catherine lend them their car to elope in. Clive, unaware that his ploy has failed, joins Porteus and Catherine, boasts of his clever plan, and the play ends with "all three in fits of laughter".

== Revivals ==
The play was produced in New York, running from September 1921 to February 1922, bringing in $20,000 a week. The first London revival was in 1931. Aynesworth again played Porteus; the cast also included Athene Seyler, Nigel Playfair, Frank Vosper, and Celia Johnson. The Circle was revived in New York in 1938 with Tallulah Bankhead as Elizabeth. John Gielgud revived the play to open his London repertory season in 1944, playing Arnold, with Leslie Banks as Porteus and cast members including Yvonne Arnaud, Cecil Trouncer and Rosalie Crutchley. The Edinburgh Gateway Company staged the play in 1965. In 1990 The Circle was presented in New York with a cast headed by Rex Harrison, Glynis Johns, Harley Venton, and Stewart Granger. From April 29 2023 to 24 February 2024, a revival of The Circle ran at the [Orange Tree Theater] in the London Borough of Richmond, with a cast that included Jane Asher (Lady Catherine), Clive Francis (Clive), Nicholas Le Prevost (Porteous), and Olivia Vinall (Elizabeth).

== Reception and critical opinion ==
The Circle was "the first of Maugham's plays to be booed". As The Times put it, "It is, of course, a bold ending – too bold, apparently, for some orthodox moralists in the gallery last night – but approved, we think, by the more mundane majority in the house.

The writer Robert Bechtold describes the play as a comedy of manners – "a rewrite of Lady Windermere's Fan a quarter of a century later in a post World War I atmosphere." The critic of The Times took a different view:

Outwardly cynical The Circle may be, yet it is by no means a comedy of manners. The moral implicit in its fun is something very different from the sententious couplets which Congreve perfunctorily tagged on to plays which pretended to neither feeling nor morality. ... The "bold" ending is surely frivolity's rather wistful salute to sincerity."

== Adaptations ==
The play was adapted for the cinema in 1925 under the same title and in 1930 as Strictly Unconventional.

== Sources ==
- Maugham, W. Somerset. The Circle. London: Heinemann. OCLC 251677413.
