= A Real Basket Case =

2007 mystery novel by Beth Groundwater

- Author: Beth Groundwater
- Language: English
- Genre: Mystery
- Publisher: Five Star Publishing
- Publication date: March 21, 2007

A Real Basket Case is a mystery novel written by Beth Groundwater. The book, published by Five Star Publishing, was initially released on March 21, 2007. It was later re-published in large print in January 2008. The novel follows the story of protagonist Claire Hanover who sets out to discover the identity of her husband's killer.

It was nominated for the Best First Novel Agatha Award in 2007. The sequel, To Hell in a Handbasket was published in 2009.

== Awards and recognition ==
Beth Groundwater won the Princess of Rejection Prize from the Sisters in Crime Guppies Chapter for receiving the second most rejections for her writings by the winter of 2005. However, in 2007, A Real Basket Case was nominated for the Best First Novel Agatha Award.

== Reception ==
The novel received favorable reviews in several major newspapers. Barbara Bibel from Booklist review commented that, "This will appeal to Desperate Housewives fans and those who like cozies with a bit of spice." Kirkus Reviews called A Real Basket Case "A tense, exciting debut."

Author J.B. Thompson praised the novel, saying "Groundwater’s well-crafted characters comprise a nicely balanced cast, and she does a good job incorporating a blend of humor and relationship drama into a deftly twisted plot with the kind of surprise ending guaranteed to satisfy. Quick-paced and well written with clear and comfortable prose, A Real Basket Case is a perfect afternoon read for cozy fans," though he also criticized the main character Claire as fallible.

== Sequels ==
Following the acclaim received for her first novel, Groundwater went on to write two sequel murder mysteries following the same protagonist Clare Hanover. To Hell In a Handbasket was published in 2009, and A Basket of Trouble was published in 2013.
