= To Hell in a Handbag =

2016 play by Helen Norton and Jonathan White

To Hell in a Handbag: The Secret Lives of Canon Chasuble and Miss Prism is a 2016 play by the Irish actor/writers Helen Norton and Jonathan White. It deals with two minor characters from Oscar Wilde’s play The Importance of Being Earnest.

== Plot ==
Much as Tom Stoppard did with two of Hamlet's attendant lords in Rosencrantz and Guildenstern Are Dead, the play To Hell in a Handbag explores its protagonists' lives when they are not onstage in Wilde's original. Beginning with their walk "to the schools and back" in Wilde’s Act II, these well-educated and impecunious individuals have survived on the lower rungs of Victorian society. Continuing with their time offstage in Act III, both have been forced to make ends meet in less than ethical and legal fashion. They find themselves mutually dependent to ensure their survival. But no sooner has The Importance ended happily, than one of the duo turns the tables on the other.

== Productions ==
To Hell in a Handbag was originally seen in the Dublin Fringe Festival in September 2016. Supported by the Show in a Bag initiative of Dublin Fringe Festival, Fishamble: The New Play Company and the Irish Theatre Institute, it was premiered at Bewley's Café Theatre on September 14, 2016. In 2017, the production was revived at the original venue before travelling to the Edinburgh Festival Fringe where it played a sell-out run at the Assembly Rooms. It then embarked on a nationwide tour of Ireland.

In 2018, the production travelled to England as part of Culture Ireland's GB18 initiative, playing right along the southern coast. One of the venues was Worthing, the seaside town where Wilde wrote the original play. It was revived again in 2019, playing in Dublin, Armagh and Wexford.

The first production not featuring its creators was in October 2019. In the Bag Theatre Company staged the play at the Two Sisters Arts Centre in Felixstowe, Suffolk.

== Reception ==
In its initial runs in Dublin and Edinburgh, the play received a universally positive response. The Irish Times said, "Helen Norton and Jonathan White, actors and writers, have pulled off a coup with their enchanting visit to the outer rim of Oscar Wilde’s The Importance of Being Earnest" and that the play "packs extraordinary amounts of plot and top-notch gags into a compact package". The Sunday Independent described it as "wickedly, side-splittingly funny, in a sophisticated, witty and elegant way" and "a joyous romp not to be missed, a worthy homage to its master and progenitor". The Observer called it a "comic gem" and "a hoot of an instant classic".
