= Guy Domville =

1894 play by Henry James

- Cover of original 1894 J. Miles & Co. edition of Guy Domville
- Author: Henry James
- Language: English
- Genre: Play
- Publisher: J. Miles & Co., London
- Publication date: October 1894
- Publication place: United Kingdom
- Media type: Print
- Pages: 79

Guy Domville is a play by Henry James first staged in London in 1895. The première performance ended with the author being jeered by a section of the audience as he bowed onstage at the end of the play. This failure largely marked the end of James's attempt to conquer the theatre. He returned to his narrative fiction and recorded this memorable pledge in his Notebooks on 23 January 1895: "I take up my own old pen again – the pen of all my old unforgettable efforts and sacred struggles. To myself – today – I need say no more. Large and full and high the future still opens. It is now indeed that I may do the work of my life. And I will."

== Plot summary ==
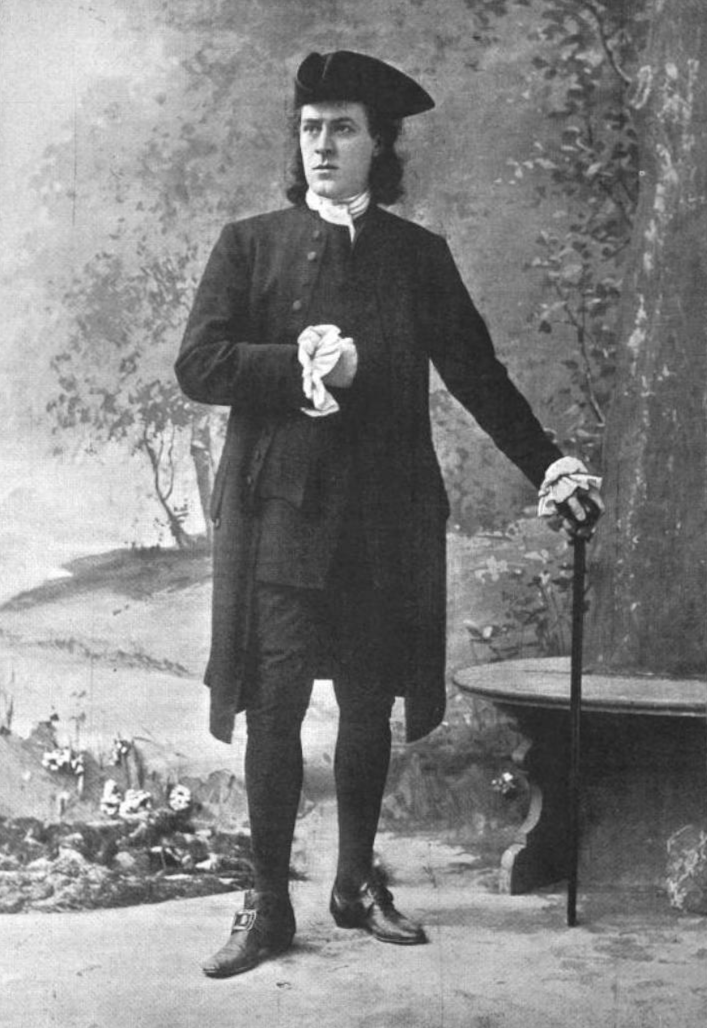
George Alexander in the title role at St James's Theatre, 1895

The play is set in 1780s England. Frank Humber proposes marriage to the widow Mrs. Peverel, whose son is tutored by Guy Domville. The tutor Domville is planning to become a Catholic priest but learns that he is the last of his family. He starts to believe that it is his duty to marry and carry on the family line. When Mrs. Peverel rejects Humber's proposal, Frank suspects she may be in love with Domville.

Guy is later about to wed Mary Brasier, but she really loves Lieutenant George Round. Once he understands the situation, Guy refuses to go through with the marriage and instead helps Mary and George elope. Domville also realizes that Frank Humber and Mrs. Peverel are in love, and commends them to each other. He will enter the priesthood, as he previously planned.

== Derivative works ==
Two recent narratives have treated the failure of Guy Domville: The Master (2004) by Colm Tóibín and Author, Author (2004) by David Lodge. It is also a central incident in the standard biography of James by Leon Edel, especially the fourth volume, The Treacherous Years: 1895–1901.
