= Hesketh Pearson =

English actor, theatre director, and writer (1887–1964)

Hesketh Pearson

Edward Hesketh Gibbons Pearson (20 February 1887 – 9 April 1964) was an English actor, theatre director and writer. He is known mainly for his biographies; they made him the leading British biographer of his time, in terms of commercial success.

== Early life ==
Pearson was born in Hawford, Claines, Worcestershire, to a family with a large number of members in Holy Orders. His parents were Thomas Henry Gibbons Pearson, a farmer, and the former Amy Mary Constance Biggs. He was a great-great nephew of the statistician and polymath Francis Galton, whom he described in Modern Men and Mummers.

After the family moved to Bedford in 1896, he was educated there at Orkney House Preparatory School for five years, a period he later described as the only unhappy episode in his life, for the compulsive flogging beloved of its headmaster. At 14, he was sent to Bedford School, where he proved an indifferent student. Rebelling against his father's desire for him to study Classics to prepare himself for a career in Holy Orders, on graduation, he entered commerce but happily accepted his dismissal as a troublemaker when he inherited £1,000 from a deceased aunt. He employed the funds to travel widely, and on his return joined his brother's car business.

Conservative by temperament, he was a passionate reader of Shakespeare's plays and a frequent theatre-goer. When his brother's business faced bankruptcy, he applied for a job with Herbert Beerbohm Tree and began acting with that theatrical entrepreneur's company in 1911. A year later, he married Gladys Gardner, one of the company's actresses.

== Wartime and first writing ==
At the outbreak of the First World War, Pearson enlisted immediately in the British Army but was soon invalided out when it was discovered that he suffered from tuberculosis. He was commissioned into the Army Service Corps and was sent to Mesopotamia, where the climate was conducive to treatment for tuberculosis. He recovered from that malady there but contracted several other diseases—septic sores, dysentery and malaria—and was close to death on three occasions. He attributed his survival to his practice of reciting long passages of Shakespeare while he was critically ill. He distinguished himself under fire and, on one occasion, received a severe head wound from shrapnel. He was subsequently awarded the Military Cross.

After the war, Pearson returned to the stage and, in 1921, met Hugh Kingsmill, an encounter that, thanks to Kingsmill's charismatic friendship and influence, changed his life. He began to write as a journalist, and published some short stories and essays. In 1926 the anonymously published Whispering Gallery, purporting to be diary pages from leading political figures, caused him to be prosecuted for attempted fraud. He won the case, partly because (according to Michael Holroyd) his "engaging candour appealed to the jury".

== Writer ==
During the 1930s and 1940s, Pearson was perhaps the most successful biographer in Britain from a commercial perspective. He started with Erasmus Darwin (a maternal ancestor) in 1930. The Smith of Smiths (1934) was a life of the Revd. Sydney Smith which retained its popularity. The four authors of what he called his 'revelations'—Wilde, Bernard Shaw, Shakespeare and Tree—were also the subjects of biographies, as were Thomas Paine, William Hazlitt, Sir Arthur Conan Doyle and Sir Walter Scott. The last to be written at the height of his powers was Johnson and Boswell (1958).

== Later life ==
Pearson was a close friend and collaborator of Malcolm Muggeridge. Richard Ingrams's later biography of Muggeridge [Muggeridge: The Biography ISBN 0-00-255610-3] said Pearson had an affair with Kitty Muggeridge in the early 1940s, while her husband, Malcolm, was in Washington, D.C.

With his first wife, Gladys, he had one son, who died in 1939. She died in 1951 and he married again, to Dorothy Joyce Ryder (1912–1976) later that year.

He died on 9 April 1964 at his home, 14 Priory Road, West Hampstead, London.

Pearson wrote two autobiographies: Thinking it Over (1938) and Hesketh Pearson by Himself (1965), which was published posthumously a year after his death.

== Works ==
- Modern Men and Mummers (1921), which describes encounters with Francis Galton (whose great-great-great nephew he was)
- A Persian Critic (1923)
- The Whispering Gallery: Leaves from a Diplomat's Diary (1926) fictional diary, published as an anonymous hoax
- Iron Rations (1928) stories
- Doctor Darwin (1930) on Erasmus Darwin
- Ventilations: Being Biographical Asides (1930)
- The Fool of Love. A Life of William Hazlitt (1934)
- The Smith of Smiths: Being the Life, Wit and Humour of Sydney Smith (1934)
- Common Misquotations (1934) editor
- Gilbert and Sullivan: A Biography (1935)
- The Swan of Lichfield: being a selection from the correspondence of Anna Seward (1936) editor
- Labby: The Life and Character of Henry Labouchere (1936)
- Tom Paine. Friend of Mankind: A Biography (1937)
- Thinking It Over (1938)
- Skye High: The Record of a Tour through Scotland in the Wake of Samuel Johnson and James Boswell (1938) with Hugh Kingsmill
- The Hero of Delhi (1939) on John Nicholson
- This Blessed Plot (1942) with Hugh Kingsmill
- A Life of Shakespeare: With An Anthology of Shakespeare's Poetry (1942)
- Bernard Shaw: His Life and Personality (1942) also G.B.S. A Full Length Portrait (US)
- Conan Doyle: His Life and Art (1943)
- Oscar Wilde, His Life and Wit (1946)
- Talking of Dick Whittington (1947) with Hugh Kingsmill
- Dickens: His Character, Comedy, and Career (1949)
- G.B.S. A Postscript (1950)
- The Last Actor-Managers (1950)
- Essays of Oscar Wilde (1950) editor
- About Kingsmill (co-author with Malcolm Muggeridge – regarding Hugh Kingsmill)
- Dizzy: The Life and Personality of Benjamin Disraeli, Earl of Beaconsfield (1951)
- The Man Whistler (1952)- (James McNeill Whistler)
- Walter Scott: His Life and Personality (1954)
- Beerbohm Tree: His Life & Laughter (1956)
- Gilbert: His Life and Strife (1957) - (W.S. Gilbert)
- Johnson and Boswell: The Story of Their Lives (1958)
- Charles II: His Life and Likeness (1960) also Merry Monarch, the Life and Likeness of Charles II (US)
- The Pilgrim Daughters (1961) also The Marrying Americans (US)
- Lives of the Wits (1962)
- Henry of Navarre (1963)
- Hesketh Pearson, By Himself (1965) autobiography
- Extraordinary People (1965) biographical essays

== See also ==
- List of biographers
- List of English actors
- List of English writers
- List of people from London
