= George Stansbury =

British composer, musical director and operatic singer

George Frederick Stansbury (7 June 1800 – 3 June 1845) was a British composer, musical director and arranger and an operatic singer. Although contemporary reviewers described his voice as of "poor quality", he was nevertheless an excellent musician and a ready composer.

== Early life ==
He was born into a musical family in Bristol in 1800, the youngest son of Irish-born musician Joseph Stansbury (died 1827) and Susannah née Prout (died 1831). His oldest brother was the violinist and pianist John Adolphus Stansbury (1792–1837) who for many years was the orchestra leader at the Theatre Royal, Bristol and of the Bristol concerts. His other brother was Joseph Augustus Stansbury (1793–1831), who played the double bass. His surviving and younger sisters (a third died in infancy) were the singers and actresses Emma Stansbury (1803–1862) and Louisa Jane Stansbury (born 1808), the latter marrying Joseph Hall in 1834. By the age of 12 George Stansbury was proficient in the piano, the violin and flute and could play most of the rest of the instruments in an orchestra.

In 1814 as 'Master G. Stansbury' he sang as a boy soprano with Angelica Catalani during her engagements in Britain, appearing with Catalani at the Bristol Festival where he shared the soprano part with her in Messiah and sang with her in the West of England Festival held at Exeter in October 1814. He was on the platform with her when she appeared during the same season in Dublin.

== Musical career ==
After this Stansbury's boy soprano voice probably broke as he disappeared from the musical scene until 1819, when he reappears on the concert platform at the Assembly Rooms in Bristol, returning there in June 1820 alongside his sister Emma Stansbury in his own benefit shortly before departing Bristol to take up the post of director of music at the Theatre Royal in Dublin where he made his first appearance as a composer with an overture to 'Life in Dublin'. He was 20 years old.

On completing his season at Dublin Stansbury went home to Bristol, where he remained until 1828. He married clergyman's daughter Frances Stratton Roberts (1791-1869) on 28 August 1822 in Bristol. In Bristol he was the chorus conductor for Messiah in 1823 under George Thomas Smart, also appearing as conductor and tenor soloist at other local venues. In May 1827 he appeared alongside his sisters at a benefit performance at the Assembly Rooms in Bristol during which he sang and played the piano. After various other local engagements, with and without his sisters, Stansbury took up the post of leader of the band at the Theatre Royal Haymarket in London, leaving his wife and their four children in Bristol. The split proved to be permanent, for in London he took up with Mary Ann Whittle (born 1812), a young dancing girl at Covent Garden and with whom he had three children.

== In London ==
In London Stansbury quickly made the transition from orchestra pit to stage, performing as Captain Macheath in Gay's The Beggar’s Opera in August 1828 opposite Miss Bartolozzi (who after her marriage found fame as Mme Vestris and William Farren. Stansbury was Hawthorn in Arne's ballad opera Love in a Village; Warbleton in The Foundling of the Forest, and Trumore in The Lord of the Manor before reprising the role of Macheath. Billed as ‘from the Haymarket Theatre’, Stansbury then moved to the Surrey Theatre where he appeared in Love in a Village and played Malcolm in The Slave. In January 1829 he was at the Theatre Royal, Covent Garden where he was employed by Charles Kemble as chorus master, composer and musical arranger, in addition to performing on stage.

At Covent Garden he played Léonce de Montgomerie opposite Lucia Elizabeth Vestris in The Nymph of the Grotto, or a daughter’s vow (January 1829), and was Maurice de Bracey in the well-received three-act opera The Maid of Judah, or, The Knights Templars , based on Scott's novel Ivanhoe, in which he took part in a quartet with the three main characters. This work was based on Ivanhoé by Rossini to a French-language libretto by Émile Deschamps and Gabriel-Gustave de Wailly. For the British version the music was arranged by Michael Rophino Lacy who also translated and revised the original libretto by Deschamps and de Wailly. During this period Stansbury wrote the music for a number of successful songs for Mme Vestris, including ‘The Banners of Blue’, 'Bonnie Scotland, I adore three' and ‘Spring is Coming’.

In July 1829 Stansbury appeared for a season at the Royal Coburg Theatre in such works as The Lord of the Manor, Love in a Village, a shortened version of the operatic after-piece No Song, No Supper, as Captain Wilson in The Flitch of Bacon, The Slave of Surinam and The Beggar’s Opera in addition to a new work based on the legend of Robin Hood and Little John in which Stansbury was the Earl of Huntingdon. He played Cathullin, Lord of Ulster, in the new operatic drama Malvina before appearing on the concert platform in Reading where he 'excited much interest' with his rendition of 'Highland Laddie'. On his return to the Theatre Royal, Covent Garden Stansbury played the Sultan opposite Mme Vestris in The Sublime and the Beautiful, and played the small role of Justice Right in The Night Before the Wedding and the Wedding Night. He was Alidoro in the pantomime Cinderella, Or, The Fairy and the Little Glass Slipper, taking on the role of Pompolino when the actor playing the part was taken ill.

In 1831 at Covent Garden Stansbury played General Duroc in Napoleon Buonaparte, also helping to write the music for the production, while in 1832 he was Beppo in Fra Diavolo. In 1833 he played the title roles in Midas and in Comus before playing Mammbre in The Israelites in Egypt. He composed the scores for various plays including for Shakespeare’s Early Days; Comrades and Friends; The Royal Fugitive; Neuha’s Cave; The Tartar Witch and the Pedlar Boy; Waverley; The Vision of the Bard, and Puss in Boots, or Harlequin and the Miller's Son. For Sadler's Wells Theatre he wrote the music for The Little Red Man, or the Witch of the Water Snakes. In addition to his seasons at the Theatre Royal, Covent Garden, from 1830 Stansbury made various appearances at the Vauxhall Gardens where he played in various new musical works, including Adelaide or the Royal William (1830); The Magic Fan, and The Sedan Chair (1832). In 1833 he played the organ at the funeral of the noted actor Edmund Kean.

== Later life ==
In 1833 Stansbury left Covent Garden to return to where his musical career had begun, becoming the musical director and conductor at the Theatre Royal, Dublin where, in addition to his duties in the orchestra pit, he also occasionally performed on the stage, playing Dandie Dinmont in Guy Mannering (1833). He directed and provided the score for the Theatre Royal's pantomime, Puss in Boots. In 1834 he left Dublin to tour the English provinces, appearing as Dandie Dinmont; Hawthorn in Love in a Village; Pietro in Masaniello, and Mr Browne-Derrington in Englishmen in India, among other works. In 1835 he returned to London on his appointment as conductor, composer and musical arranger at the St James's Theatre, then under the management of John Braham. Here he reprised Dandie Dinmont and Beppo on stage, and provided the orchestration for Mary Anne à Beckett's score for Agnes Sorel (1836), and provided the music for her one-act burletta, Wanted, a Brigand, or, A visit from Fra-Diavolo (1837). Stansbury arranged the burletta Cosimo, adapting it from the original French, while at the same time he continued his appearances at the Vauxhall Gardens where he was a stage performer, played in the pit and continued to compose; a notable work of his at this time was ‘Victorian Ode’.

In 1838 at the Theatre Royal, Drury Lane Stansbury played Rodolphe in William Tell, reprised Beppo in Fra Diavolo, and wrote the music for The King of the Mist. In 1839 he was at the Surrey Theatre. He was called on at short notice to take over the title-role on opening night in Michael William Balfe’s production of Scaramuccia at the English Opera House, owing to the 'incapacitation' (a contemporary euphemism for 'drunk') of Adam Leffler. He went on an operatic tour of the provinces with Emma Romer and the tenor John Templeton, with Stansbury singing the baritone and bass roles, including Hela in The Mountain Sylph, Rodolfo in La sonnambula, Figaro in The Marriage of Figaro and Dulcamara in The Love Spell. In 1841 he was to return to the Surrey Theatre as chef d'orchestre, where he was to remain for the last four years of his life. At the same time he continued to sing in concerts and commenced a career as a teacher of voice, for a time tutoring Hamilton Braham, the son of John Braham, who would later find success as a bass.

Stansbury resigned from his position at the Surrey Theatre following a falling-out with the management. He was about to appear at the Princess’s Theatre when he was taken ill. He died of dropsy shortly after at his home, 5 Melina Place, Westminster Road in June 1845, just 4 days shy of his 45th birthday. He was buried in West Norwood Cemetery on what would have been his birthday. Despite having a liberal income during the height of his success he died in poverty, his hard living and hard spending leaving him with nothing. More importantly, it left his two families - one in Bristol and one in London - with nothing also.

Stansbury's only surviving child born out of wedlock with Mary Ann Whittle was the only one of his children to follow him on to the stage. His daughter Mary Ann Georgiana Stansbury (1838-1902) became an actress who, with her husband, the actor Henry Loydall (1830-1903), toured the provinces of northern England and Scotland during the 1860s and after.
