= Gilbert à Beckett =

Gilbert à Beckett may refer to:

- Gilbert Abbott à Beckett (1811–1856), English humorist
- Gilbert Arthur à Beckett (1837–1891), his son, English writer
