= Agnes Sorel (opera) =

Opera by Mary Anne à Beckett

Agnes Sorel is an 1836 opera by Mary Anne à Beckett, with a libretto by her husband, Gilbert A. à Beckett.

Described as "an operatic farce", the work was loosely based on the life of Agnès Sorel, mistress of Charles VII of France. The piece, with words by the composer's husband, was the first production at John Braham's St James's Theatre in London in 1835. The score was orchestrated by George Stansbury. The anonymous reviewer in The Times dismissed the libretto as "cold, dull and comfortless", but praised some of the music as "evinc[ing] no inconsiderable share of taste and skill". The composer turned down the suggestion that she should conduct the performances herself, declining to make public appearances, but her sister, Emilie Glossop, made her debut, very successfully, in this production.

== Sources ==
- À Beckett, Arthur William (1903). The à Becketts of "Punch". London: Constable. OCLC 770982283.
