= Frances Waldegrave =

English heiress (1821-1879)

Frances Elizabeth Anne Waldegrave Countess Waldegrave
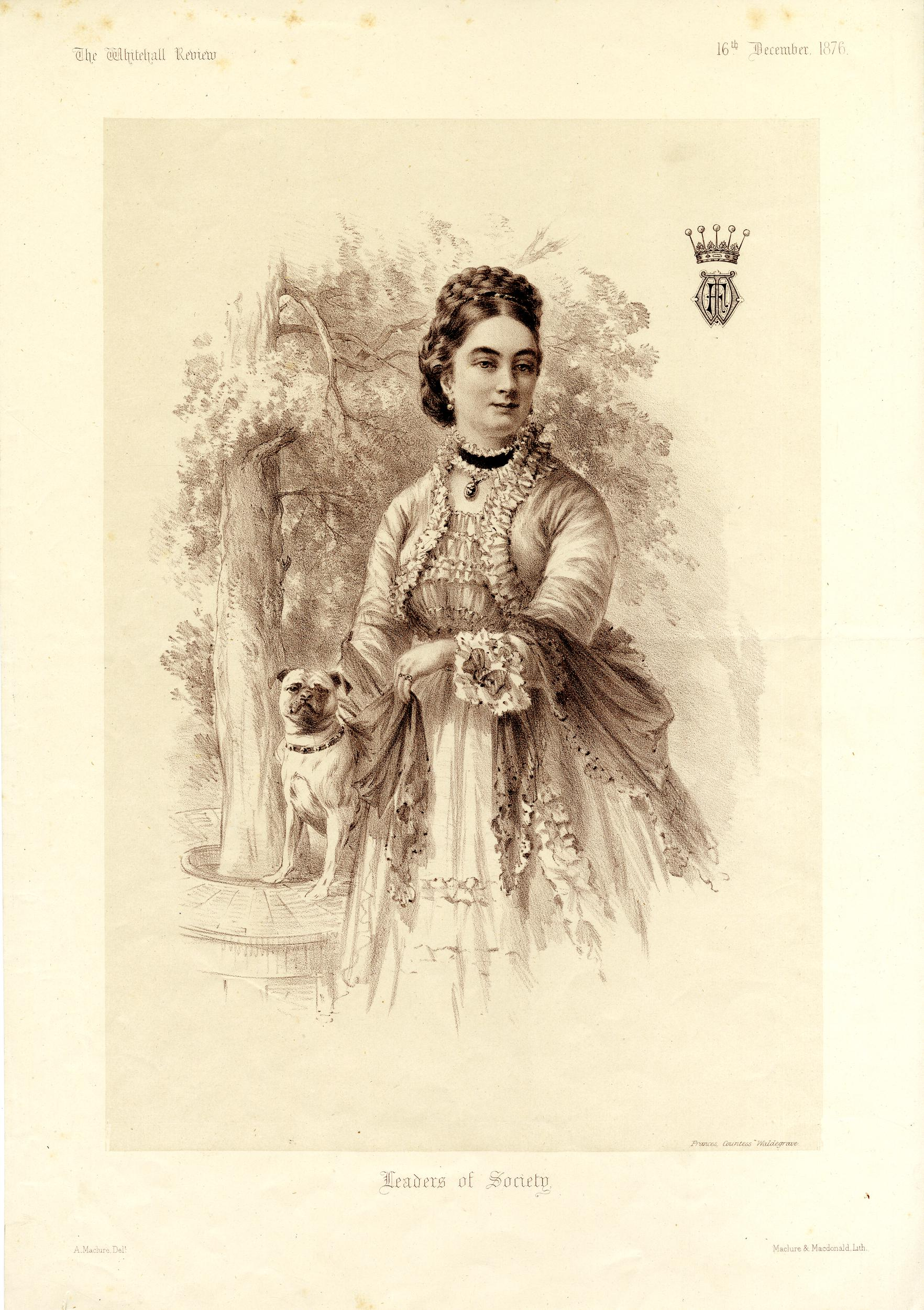
- Portrait of Frances Waldegrave
- Born: 4 January 1821; London, England
- Died: 5 July 1879 (aged 58); 7 Carlton Gardens, London, England
- Resting place: Chewton, England
- Spouse(s): John James Waldegrave (m. 1839; died 1839) George Edward Waldegrave (m. 1840; died 1846) George Harcourt (m. 1847; died 1861) Chichester Fortescue (m. 1863)
- Children: 0
- Father: John Braham

Frances Elizabeth Anne Waldegrave, Countess Waldegrave (4 January 1821 – 5 July 1879), was the daughter of John Braham, the singer, and a noted society heiress.

== Life ==
Frances was born in London on 4 January 1821. On 25 May 1839 she married John James Waldegrave (illegitimate son of John Waldegrave, 6th Earl Waldegrave) of Navestock, Essex, who died in the same year.

She married secondly, on 28 September 1840, his younger legitimate brother, George Edward, 7th Earl Waldegrave. After the marriage her husband was sentenced to six months' imprisonment for assault. During his detention she lived with him in the Queen's Bench prison, and on his release they retired into the country. Upon his death on 28 September 1846, she found herself possessed of the whole of the Waldegrave estates, including residences at Strawberry Hill, Chewton in Somerset, and Dudbrook in Essex, but with little knowledge of the world to guide her conduct.

She married for a third time on 30 September 1847 George Granville Harcourt of Nuneham and Stanton Harcourt, Oxfordshire. Her third husband, who was a widower and her senior by thirty-six years (being sixty-two at the date of the marriage, while she was only twenty-six), was the eldest son of Edward Harcourt, Archbishop of York, and a follower of Robert Peel, whom he supported in Parliament as member for Oxfordshire.

As Harcourt's wife, Lady Waldegrave first exhibited her rare capacity as a leader and hostess of society. Of her conduct to Harcourt, Sir William Gregory wrote in his Autobiography: "She was an excellent wife to him, and neither during her life with him nor previously was there ever a whisper of disparagement to her character. No great lady held her head higher or more rigorously ruled her society. Her home was always gay, and her parties at Nuneham were the liveliest of the time; but she never suffered the slightest indecorum, nor tolerated improprieties." She delighted in private theatricals, and her favourite piece, which she acted over and over again both at Nuneham and Woburn, was the Honeymoon, because it had some allusions to her own position. She always said she should have liked to act Lady Teazle, if it had not been that the references to the old husband were too pointed. The other pieces in which she performed were generally translations of French vaudevilles.

Some years before Harcourt's death she decided to reopen Strawberry Hill House, which had been left to her by her second husband, whose father had inherited it from Horace Walpole. The mansion had been completely dismantled by Lord Waldegrave and denuded of all its treasures in 1842. She preserved Horace Walpole's house exactly as it stood, and restored to it many of its dispersed treasures. The stable wing was turned into a set of sleeping-rooms for guests, and she joined it to the main building by two large rooms. These contained two collections, the one of eighteenth-century pictures of members of the families of Walpole and Waldegrave, the other of portraits of her own friends and contemporaries. Strawberry Hill, when finished, became a still more convenient rendezvous for the political and diplomatic society of London than Nuneham had been.

Harcourt died on 19 December 1861, and then Strawberry Hill became her principal residence, although she occasionally resided at the Waldegrave mansions of Chewton in Somerset and Dudbrook in Essex, both of which she restored and enlarged. On 20 January 1863 she married Chichester Samuel Parkinson Fortescue (afterwards Lord Carlingford), and from that time until her death her abilities, as well as her fortune, were devoted to the success of his political career and of his Liberal Party. Her salon at Strawberry Hill or at her residence in London, 7 Carlton Gardens, was from the date of her fourth marriage until her death, sixteen years later, one of the chief meeting-places of the Liberal leaders.

La Bruyère described Lady Waldegrave as "a handsome woman with the virtues of an honest man," who united "in her own person the best qualities of both sexes." Her reward for the exercise of these virtues was the affectionate friendship with which she was regarded by all who knew her. In conversation she preferred to listen rather than to shine. Flashes of wit occasionally came from her lips without effort or preparation, but she forgot her epigrams as soon as she uttered them; indeed she was known on more than one occasion to repeat her own jests, forgetting their origin and attributing them to other people. Her friends among politicians and men of letters included the Duc d'Aumale, the Duke of Newcastle, Edward Lear, Lords Grey and Clarendon, M. Van de Weyer, Bishop Wilberforce, Abraham Hayward, and Bernal Osborne. Among her associates who were nearer her own age, Sir William Harcourt (the nephew of her third husband), Lord Dufferin and Lord Ampthill, Julian Fane, and Lord Alcester were perhaps the most noteworthy. On 10 July 1870 she and her (4th) husband dined with Queen Victoria who noted - perhaps a little sharply - in her Journal: "L^{y} Waldegrave & M^{r} Fortescue, the Van de Weyers & L^{d} Wrottesley dined. L^{y} Waldegrave is certainly a very clever woman. M^{r} Fortescue is her 4th Husband!"

== Death and legacy ==
Lady Waldegrave died without issue at her residence, 7 Carlton Gardens, London, on 5 July 1879, and was buried at Chewton, where Lord Carlingford erected a monument to her memory. Portraits of Lady Waldegrave were painted by Dubufe, Tissot, James Rannie Swinton, and other artists. A full-length marble statue was executed by Matthew Noble. Waldegrave Road, which passes Strawberry Hill and is one of the main roads linking Twickenham with Teddington, is named after her.

Anthony Trollope was thought by many to have fictionalized Lady Waldegrave as Madame Max Goesler in his 1869 novel Phineas Finn.

== See also ==
- List of entertainers who married titled Britons

== Sources ==
- "Waldegrave, Frances Elizabeth Anne" . Dictionary of National Biography. London: Smith, Elder & Co. 1885–1900.
- Hewett, Osbert Wyndham. Strawberry Fair: A Biography of Frances, Countess Waldegrave, 1821-1879 (John Murray, 1956)
