= Bourne (stream) =

Small intermittent river or stream

A bourne (Note: Alternative forms are bourn, borne, or born.) is an intermittent stream, flowing from a spring. Frequent in chalk and limestone country where the rock becomes saturated with winter rain, that slowly drains away until the rock becomes dry, when the stream ceases. The term bourne may also be applied to a stream or river that permanently flows.

It is common in southern England where it is a name for a small river or stream usually in chalk downland countryside. The original form of bourne was the Old English burna. Later words such as Brunne and Brunna preserve this early form. The compound winterbourne describes a stream or river that is dry in summer but flows in winter.

Settlements around a stream have often taken their names from the stream. For example, in the modern simplex form: Bourne, Lincolnshire whereas other settlements added a prefix later, as an example Westbourne, West Sussex. In the compound form the first element can describe the surroundings, the vegetation in the area or the place of the settlement with reference to the stream.

== Variations ==
Burn is thought to have the same etymology as Bourne. It can be used for permanently flowing streams as well as intermittent streams. It is common in Scotland and in North East England and can be applied to place-names such as Blackburn, Gisburn, Woburn, Kilburn and Winkburn.

The Old Norse brunnr - meaning 'spring stream' does not seem to appear in English place-names, even in the areas that were under Scandinavian control.

The apparent variant, borne found in the placename: Camborne, arises from the Cornish language and is in fact a false friend: it refers to a hill (Cornish: bronn, from Common Brythonic *brunda; compare Welsh bryn).
