= Mary Anne à Beckett =

English composer (1815–1863)

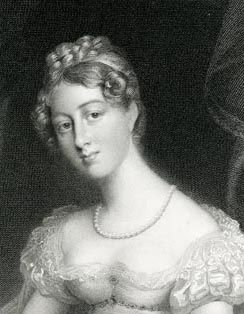
Mary Anne à Beckett

Mary Anne à Beckett (29 April 1815 – 11 December 1863) (Note: Other sources give 1817 or 1818 as her year of birth, but having checked against the official records for the family members the biographer Dudley Cheke endorses the earlier date.) was an English composer, primarily known for opera. She was the wife of the writer Gilbert à Beckett, who provided the libretti for two of her operas. Their children included the writers Gilbert Arthur à Beckett and Arthur William à Beckett. Her theatrical connections included her brother, the actor and producer impresario Augustus Glossop Harris, and his eldest son, also an impresario, Sir Augustus Harris.

== Biography ==
Mary Anne à Beckett was born in London, the eldest daughter of Joseph Glossop and his wife, Elizabeth, née Feron. Among their other children was the future actor and producer Augustus Glossop Harris, whose elder son was the impresario Sir Augustus Harris. Glossop, a man of doubtful financial means, was at various times lessee of the Royal Coburg Theatre (now called the Old Vic), and manager of La Scala, Milan, and the Teatro San Carlo in Naples. His wife, the daughter of an émigré from the French Revolution, sang professionally under her maiden name, "Madame Feron".

In January 1835 Mary Anne married Gilbert à Beckett, a writer and magistrate. They had two daughters and four sons, including Gilbert Arthur à Beckett and Arthur William à Beckett.

Mary Anne à Beckett composed songs, piano pieces, incidental music, and three operas: Agnes Sorel (1835), Little Red Riding Hood (1842) and The Young Pretender (1846). The most successful of these was the first, described as "an operatic farce", loosely based on the life of Agnès Sorel, mistress of Charles VII of France. The piece, with words by the composer's husband, was the first production at John Braham's St James's Theatre in London in 1835. The anonymous reviewer in The Times dismissed the libretto as "cold, dull and comfortless", but praised some of the music as "evinc[ing] no inconsiderable share of taste and skill". The composer turned down the suggestion that she should conduct the performances herself, declining to make public appearances, but her sister, Emilie Glossop, made her debut, very successfully, in this production. Little Red Riding Hood, with libretto by Gilbert à Beckett, opened at the Surrey Theatre in August 1842. A reviewer in The Musical World praised the music, and commented that though it was not conspicuously original it was "adroitly put together, and … is consequently preferable to some loftier doings in loftier places, which, in their aim to be very original, are far less pleasing in their material, and far more clumsily dovetailed."

The music for the last of her three operas The Young Pretender was, like that of its 1835 predecessor, better received than the libretto (which was by Mark Lemon). The Times praised "some pretty pieces of vocal music in light Italian style"; the reviewer in The Observer considered the score, "not original in its melodies nor scientific in its construction", but reserved his severest censure for Lemon's libretto: "as dreary a production as it is possible to imagine in any work professing to be a drama". The following year she published The Music Book, a collection of twenty original songs, quadrilles and waltzes by her and her male British contemporaries.

Gilbert à Beckett died in 1856, and in July 1857 his widow was given a civil list pension of £100 in recognition of her husband's contributions to society as a magistrate and writer. Lemon was one of the trustees of the pension.

== Compositions ==
=== Operas and incidental music ===
- Agnes Sorel, opera. 1836, St James's Theatre London
- Incidental music to Mabel's Curse by Anna Maria Fielding, 1837, St James's Theatre
- Incidental music (with George Stansbury) to Wanted, a Brigand, or, A visit from Fra-Diavolo, 1837. Musical burletta in one act by Gilbert A'Beckett, St James's Theatre.
- Little Red Riding Hood. A Fairy Opera, 1842, Surrey Theatre, London
- The Young Pretender, musical play with libretto by Mark Lemon, 1846, Haymarket Theatre, London.

=== Songs and Duets ===
- "Vainly to me of love you speak". Duet. Words by Gilbert A'Beckett. c 1840
- "Farewell dear scenes". Ballad. 1842
- "Wherefore maiden art thou straying?" .Rondo.1842
- "Tis not the sparkling diadem". Ballad. 1842
- "When mem'ry through the mist of tears". 1843
- "Dear scenes of happier hours". Ballad. 1845
- "My home must be where'er thou art". Words by Mark Lemon, 1846
- "I dream of thee". Song. Words by Barry Cornwall. 1847
- "Love me if I live". Song. Words by Barry Cornwall. 1847
- "My home must be where'er thou art". Song. Words by Mark Lemon. 1847
- "Lightly won is lightly held". Duett. Words by Mark Lemon. 1847
- "A maiden from her lonely bow'r". Ballad. Words by Mark Lemon. 1847
- "One kindly word before we part. Ballad. Words by Mark Lemon. 1847
- "Ne'er think that I'll forget thee". Words by the composer. Ballad. 1850
- "It is o'er, that happy dream". Ballad. Words by Bertie Vyse. 1851
- "Do not smile". Ballad. Words by J D Douglas. 1851
- "And must we then in silence meet". Ballad. Words by the composer. 1851
- "Dear scenes of happier hours". Ballad. Words by Gilbert A'Beckett. 1854
- "Oh! come again sweet summer time". Ballad. Words by William A'Beckett. 1854
- "Take back thy gift". Ballad. Words by Gilbert A'Beckett. 1854
- "Dear scenes of happier hours" .Ballad . Words by Gilbert A'Beckett.1854
- "Dear Italy". Ballad. Words by Gilbert A'Beckett. 1856
- "Dear old England". A patriotic song . Words by Mrs V Roberts. 1859

=== Piano pieces ===
- "The Casino Waltz". 1890
- "The Ridotto Waltz". 1847
- "The Royal Nursery Quadrilles, or Popular Nursery Tunes". 1854

Source: Music und Gender im Internet.

== Notes and references ==
Notes

== Sources ==
- À Beckett, Arthur William (1903). The à Becketts of "Punch". London: Constable. OCLC 770982283.
- Cheke, Dudley (1993). Joséphine and Emilie : stars of the bel canto in Europe and America, 1823-1889. Oxford: Carpenter. ISBN 1897766084.
