= Ivanhoé =

1826 opera by Gioachino Rossini

- Pastiche opera by Gioachino Rossini
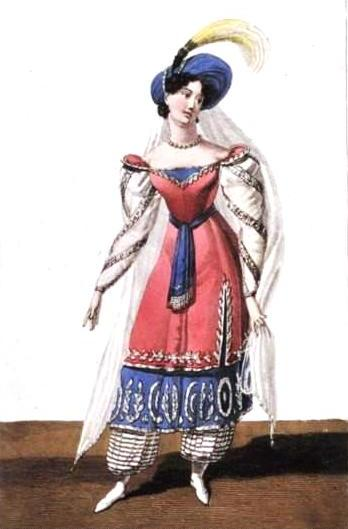
- Mademoiselle Lemoule as Léila
- Librettist: Émile Deschamps; Gabriel-Gustave de Wailly
- Language: French
- Based on: Walter Scott's Ivanhoe
- Premiere: 15 September 1826; Odéon Theatre, Paris

Ivanhoé is an 1826 pastiche opera in three acts with music by Gioachino Rossini to a French-language libretto by Émile Deschamps and Gabriel-Gustave de Wailly, after Walter Scott's 1819 novel of the same name. The music was adapted, with the composer's permission, by the music-publisher Antonio Pacini from Rossini's operas, namely Semiramide, La Cenerentola, La gazza ladra, and Tancredi in order to introduce his music to Paris. An examination of the score shows that Pacini also used music from Bianca e Faliero, Armida, Maometto II, Aureliano in Palmira, Sigismondo, Torvaldo e Dorliska, Mosè in Egitto and an amount of newly composed music including fanfares and the gallop that was later to become famous from its inclusion in Guglielmo Tell. The work was premiered on 15 September 1826, at the Odéon Theatre.

It was performed in England in 1829 as The Maid of Judah with music arranged by Michael Rophino Lacy who also translated and revised the original libretto by Deschamps and de Wailly. The Lacy version was also performed in New York at the Park Theatre in 1832. The first performance of Ivanhoé in modern times was given at the Festival della Valle d'Itria in 2001.

== Roles ==
Role	Voice type	Premiere cast, 15 September 1826 (Conductor: -)
Ivanhoé	tenor	Lecomte
Léila	soprano	Lemoule
Brian de Boisguilbert	bass	Leclerc
Ismael	baritone	Léon
Cédric	baritone	V Adolphe
Le Marquis Lucas de Beaumanoir	bass	Charles
Albert de Malvoisin	tenor	Peyronnet
A herald	tenor	Masson
Thierry	silent	

== Recordings ==
- Rossini: Ivanhoé – Simon Edwards (Ivanhoé), Inga Balabanova (Leila), Soon-Won Kang (Brian de Boisguilbert), Filippo Morace (Ismaele), Massimiliano Chiarolla (Cedric); Bratislava Chamber Choir and the Orchestra Internazionale d'Italia conducted by Paolo Arrivabeni. Live recording from the 2001 performance at the Festival della Valle d'Itria. Label: Dynamic CDS397
