= George Harcourt =

British Whig and then Conservative Party politician

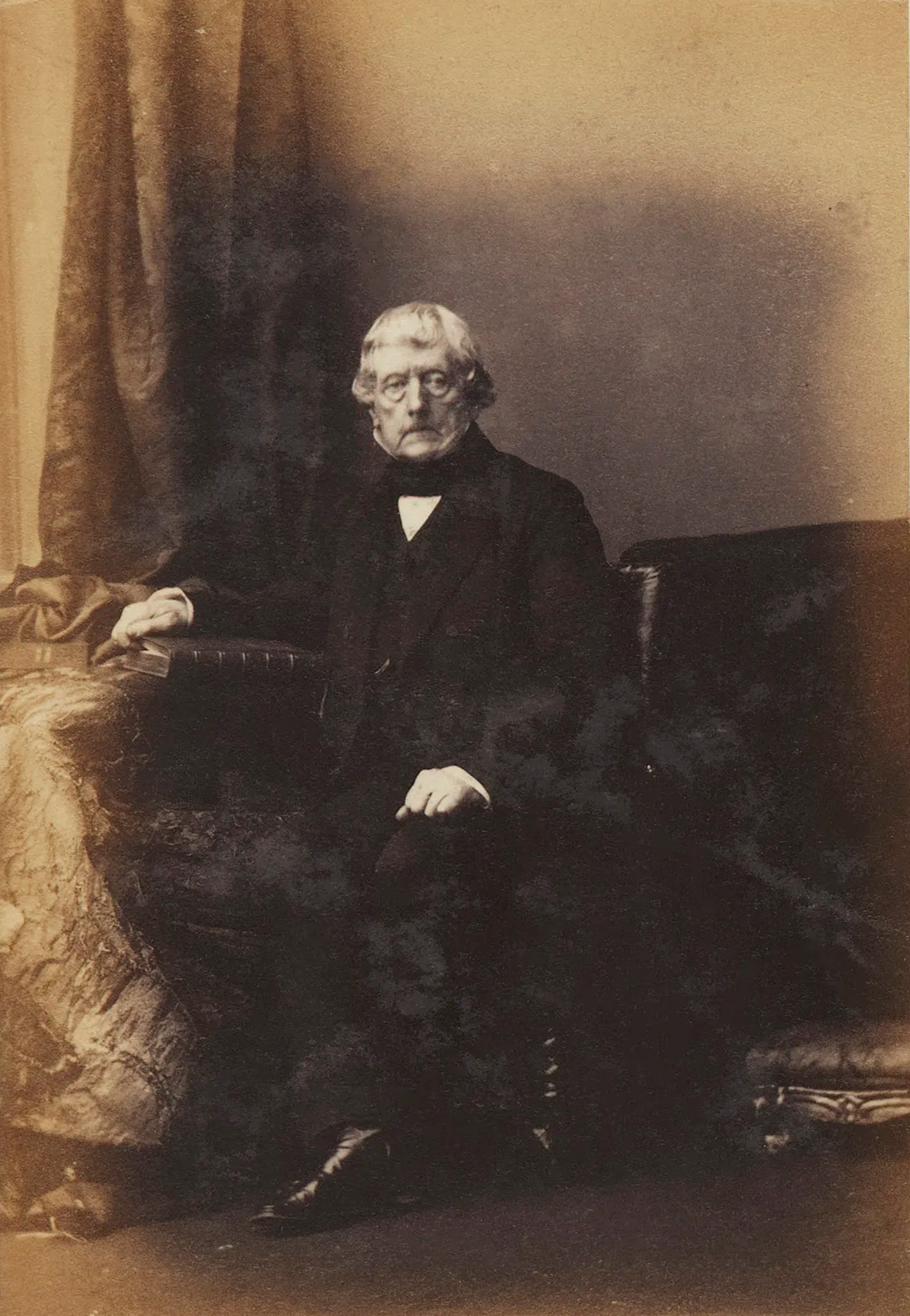
Portrait by Camille Silvy, 1860

George Granville Harcourt (né Venables-Harcourt and Vernon-Harcourt, 6 August 1785 – 19 December 1861) was a British Whig and then Conservative Party politician.

== Background ==
Harcourt was the eldest son of clergyman Edward Venables-Vernon-Harcourt.

== Political career ==
Harcourt was elected as MP for Lichfield in 1806 and which he represented until he was elected for Oxfordshire in 1831. By 1850 he had become the longest-serving member, and so became the Father of the House of Commons for the last 11 years of his life.

== Family ==
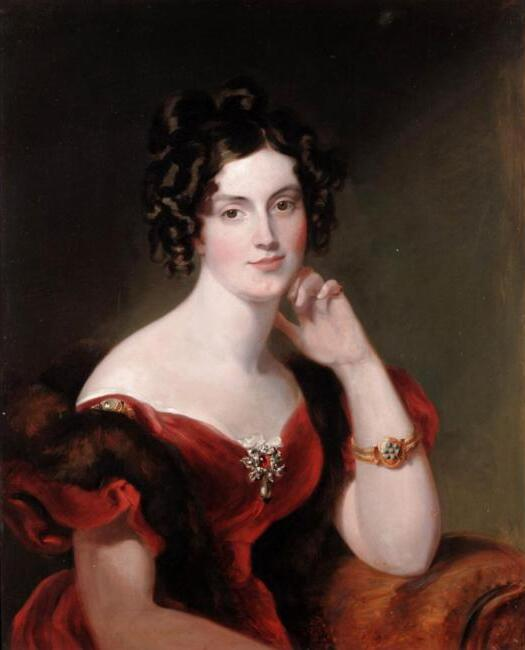
Lady Elizabeth Bingham, wife of George Harcourt, by Sir George Hayter

On 27 March 1815, he married Lady Elizabeth Bingham (the eldest daughter of the 2nd Earl of Lucan) and they had one child, Elizabeth Lavinia Anne (d. 1858, married Montagu Bertie, 6th Earl of Abingdon. It was through this marriage that Wytham Abbey passed to the Earls of Abingdon). Harcourt's wife died in 1838 and he then married Frances Waldegrave (the widow of the 7th Earl Waldegrave and future wife of the 1st Baron Carlingford), a daughter of the noted tenor, John Braham.

Parliament of the United Kingdom
Preceded by Sir George Anson; Sir John Wrottesley	Member of Parliament for Lichfield; 1806–1831; With: Sir George Anson	Succeeded by Sir George Anson; Sir Edward Scott
Preceded by John Fane; Lord Norreys	Member of Parliament for Oxfordshire; 1831–1861; With: Richard Weyland 1831–1837; Lord Norreys 1832–1852; Hon. Thomas Parker 1837–1841; Joseph Warner Henley 1841–1861; John North 1852–1861	Succeeded by John William Fane; Joseph Warner Henley; John Sidney North
Honorary titles
Preceded by Charles Williams-Wynn	Father of the House; 1850–1861	Succeeded by Sir Charles Burrell
