= St James's Theatre =

Former theatre in City of Westminster, London, England

Coordinates: 51.50603°N 0.13758°W

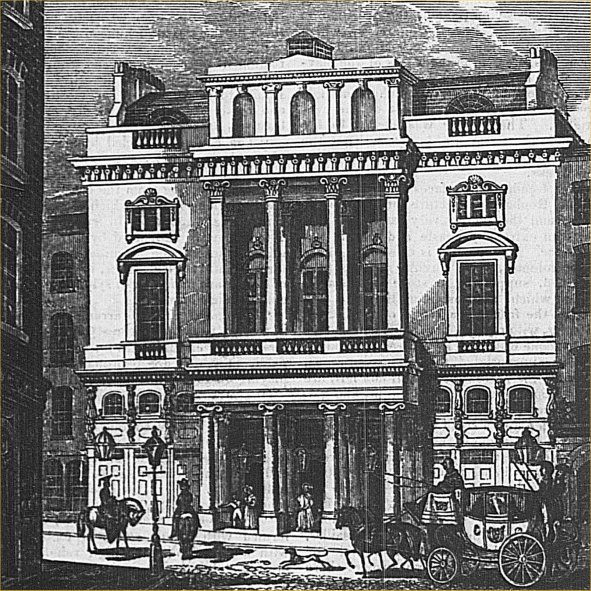
Façade of the theatre, 1836

The St James's Theatre was in King Street, St James's, London. It opened in 1835 and was demolished in 1957. The theatre was conceived by and built for a popular singer, John Braham; it lost money and after three seasons he retired. A succession of managements over the next forty years also failed to make it a commercial success, and St James's acquired a reputation as an unlucky theatre. It was not until 1879–1888, under the management of the actors John Hare and Madge and W. H. Kendal that the theatre began to prosper.

The Hare-Kendal management was succeeded, after brief and disastrous attempts by other lessees, by that of the actor-manager George Alexander, who was in charge from 1891 until his death in 1918. Under Alexander the house gained a reputation for programming that was adventurous without going too far for the tastes of London society. Among the plays he presented were Oscar Wilde's Lady Windermere's Fan (1892) and The Importance of Being Earnest (1895), and A. W. Pinero's The Second Mrs Tanqueray (1893).

After Alexander's death the theatre came under the control of a succession of managements. Among the long-running productions were The Last of Mrs Cheyney (1925), Interference (1927), The Late Christopher Bean (1933) and Ladies in Retirement (1939). In January 1950 Laurence Olivier and his wife Vivien Leigh took over the management of the theatre. Their successes included Venus Observed (1950) and for the 1951 Festival of Britain season Caesar and Cleopatra and Antony and Cleopatra.

In 1954 Terence Rattigan's Separate Tables began a run of 726 performances, the longest in the history of the St James's. During the run it emerged that a property developer had acquired the freehold of the theatre and obtained the requisite legal authority to knock it down and replace it with an office block. Despite widespread protests the theatre closed in July 1957 and was demolished in December of that year.

== History ==
=== Background and construction ===
In 1878 Old and New London commented that the St James's Theatre owed its existence "to one of those unaccountable infatuations which stake the earnings of a lifetime upon a hazardous speculation". John Braham, a veteran operatic star, planned a theatre in the fashionable St James's area, on a site in King Street, bounded by Crown Passage to the west, Angel Court to the east and buildings in Pall Mall to the south. A hotel called Nerot's had stood there since the 17th century but was by now abandoned and decaying. To generate income, the façade would incorporate one or two shops. Building and opening the theatre were not straightforward. The Theatres Trust comments that Braham quarrelled regularly with his architect, Samuel Beazley, and other professional advisers and contractors. He also faced difficulties in obtaining the necessary licence to open a theatre; the management of the nearby Theatre Royal, Haymarket opposed it, as did other interested parties. The licence was issued by the Lord Chamberlain on the instructions of William IV, but Braham continued to encounter opposition from rivals.

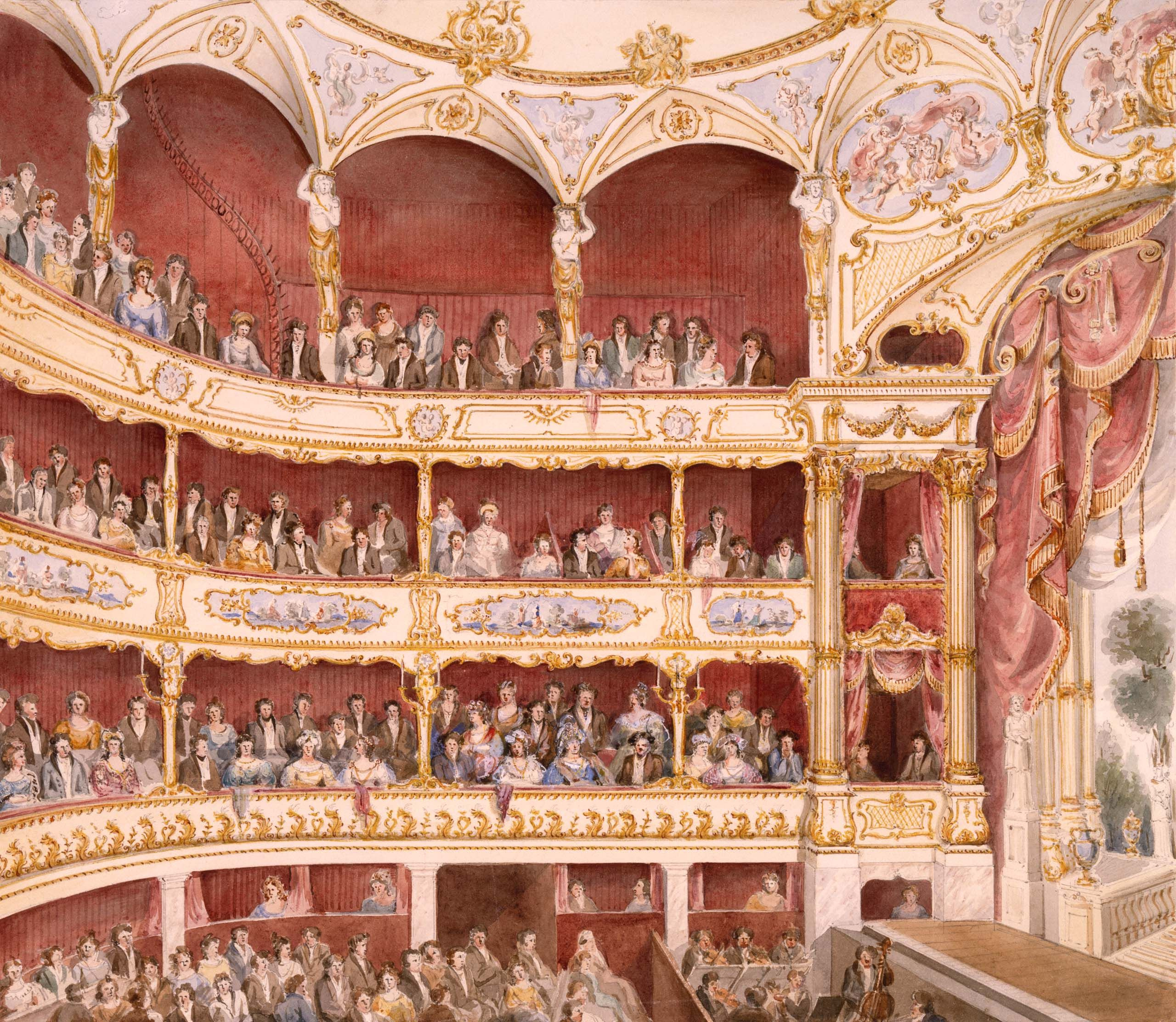
Illustration of the interior by John Gregory Crace

The theatre, which cost Braham £28,000, was designed with a neo-classical exterior and a Louis XIV style interior built by the partnership of Grissell and Peto. The frontage was in three bays, three storeys high, with shops in each outer bay. The façade had a four-column Ionic portico, a balustraded balcony and a two-storey loggia topped by a tall sheer attic. The interior was decorated by the Frederick Crace Company of Wigmore Street, London. After the opening, The Times described it in detail:

The prevailing colour is a delicate French white. A border of flowers, richly embossed in gold, runs round the dress circle, and has a tasteful and elegant effect. The panels of the boxes in the front of the first circle are ornamented by designs, in the style of Watteau, placed in gilded frames of fanciful workmanship. … The front of the slips and gallery are distinguished by neat gold ornaments, relieved by handsome medallions. The proscenium, which, like that of Covent-garden, is shell-form, is painted in compartments, where the loves and graces are depicted gaily disporting. Two slender fluted Corinthian columns, supported on pedestals of imitative marble, add greatly to the beauty of the stage-boxes. A series of arches, supporting the roof, and sustained by caryatides, runs entirely round the upper part of the theatre. ... The tout ensemble of the house is light and brilliant. It looks like a fairy palace. Then, the two great points which are most important to the comfort of an audience – hearing and seeing – have been sedulously consulted; and, with reference to them, we think that the new theatre takes the lead of all its brethren.

=== Early years: 1835–1857 ===
The theatre opened on 14 December 1835 with a triple bill consisting of two farces by Gilbert à Beckett and an opera, Agnes Sorel, with music by his wife, Mary Anne à Beckett. (Note: Because of the terms of his licence Braham had to advertise the opera as an "opera burletta".) This ran for a month before being replaced by one of the few successes of Braham's tenure, another bill containing an operetta – Monsieur Jacques – and a farce, The Strange Gentleman, by "Boz" (Charles Dickens). In April 1836 the first of many visiting French companies played at the theatre, a tradition that endured intermittently throughout the 122-year existence of the St James's.

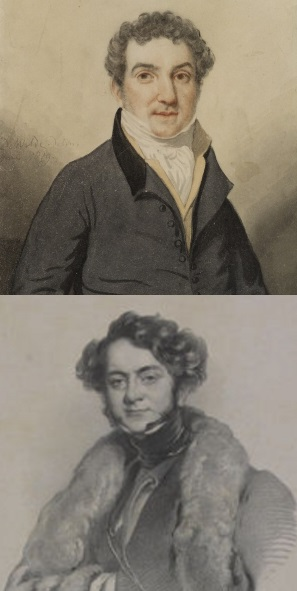
Early managers: John Braham (top) and Alfred Bunn

The theatre did not attract the public in the numbers Braham had expected; in addition to its unexciting programmes it was felt to be too far west to appeal to theatregoers. Braham struggled financially and after three seasons he gave up. John Hooper, previously Braham's stage director, ran the theatre for four months in 1839. His programmes included the presentation of performing lions, monkeys, dogs and goats. In November 1839 Alfred Bunn, whom the theatre critic and historian J. C. Trewin called a former "autocrat of Drury Lane and Covent Garden", took over the house, and changed its name to "The Prince's Theatre" in honour of the Prince Consort. Among Bunn's early offerings was a season of German opera, beginning with Der Freischütz. Queen Victoria and the Prince Consort came to two performances during the season, (Note: The operas they saw were Faust by Louis Spohr and La clemenza di Tito by Mozart.) but otherwise Bunn's tenure was undistinguished and unprofitable.

The theatre was dark for most of 1841. In 1842 John Mitchell (1806–1874), a bookseller and founder of the Bond Street Ticket Agency, took over, reverted the name to the original, and ran the St James's for twelve years, with much artistic success but little financial return. He presented French plays with the greatest stars of the Parisian stage, including Rachel, Jeanne Plessy, Virginie Déjazet and Frédérick Lemaître. He also engaged a French opera company, which opened in January 1849 with Le domino noir, and followed with L'ambassadrice, La dame blanche, Richard Coeur-de-Lion, Le chalet and many other popular French works. In between French offerings, Mitchell occasionally sub-let the theatre. In 1846, an amateur performance of Ben Jonson's Every Man in his Humour included Dickens playing Captain Bobadil. Mitchell had a fondness for international entertainments, and presented German conjurors, Tyrolean singers, dramatic readings by Fanny Kemble, P. T. Barnum's infant prodigies – Kate and Ellen Bateman, aged eight and six – in scenes from Shakespeare, and, most popular of all, the Ethiopian Serenaders who enthused London about the American-style minstrel shows, a form of entertainment that remained popular for decades.

After Mitchell left, the actress Laura Seymour (1820–1879) ran the theatre for a season in association with Charles Reade, from October 1854 to March 1855. Under Seymour's management the interior was remodelled, replacing the first tier of boxes with the now more fashionable dress circle. Among the few notable aspects of her tenure was the London debut of the comic actor J. L. Toole. The house was once again dark for most of 1856, but in 1857 the theatre returned to royal and public favour when Jacques Offenbach brought his opéra bouffe company from Paris, with a repertoire of nine of his works. This was followed by the Christy Minstrels who played to good houses for two weeks in August 1857 before moving to other venues. (Note: The success of the troupe continued for many years, and its popularity caused many rivals to copy their name.)

=== Five managements: 1858–1869 ===
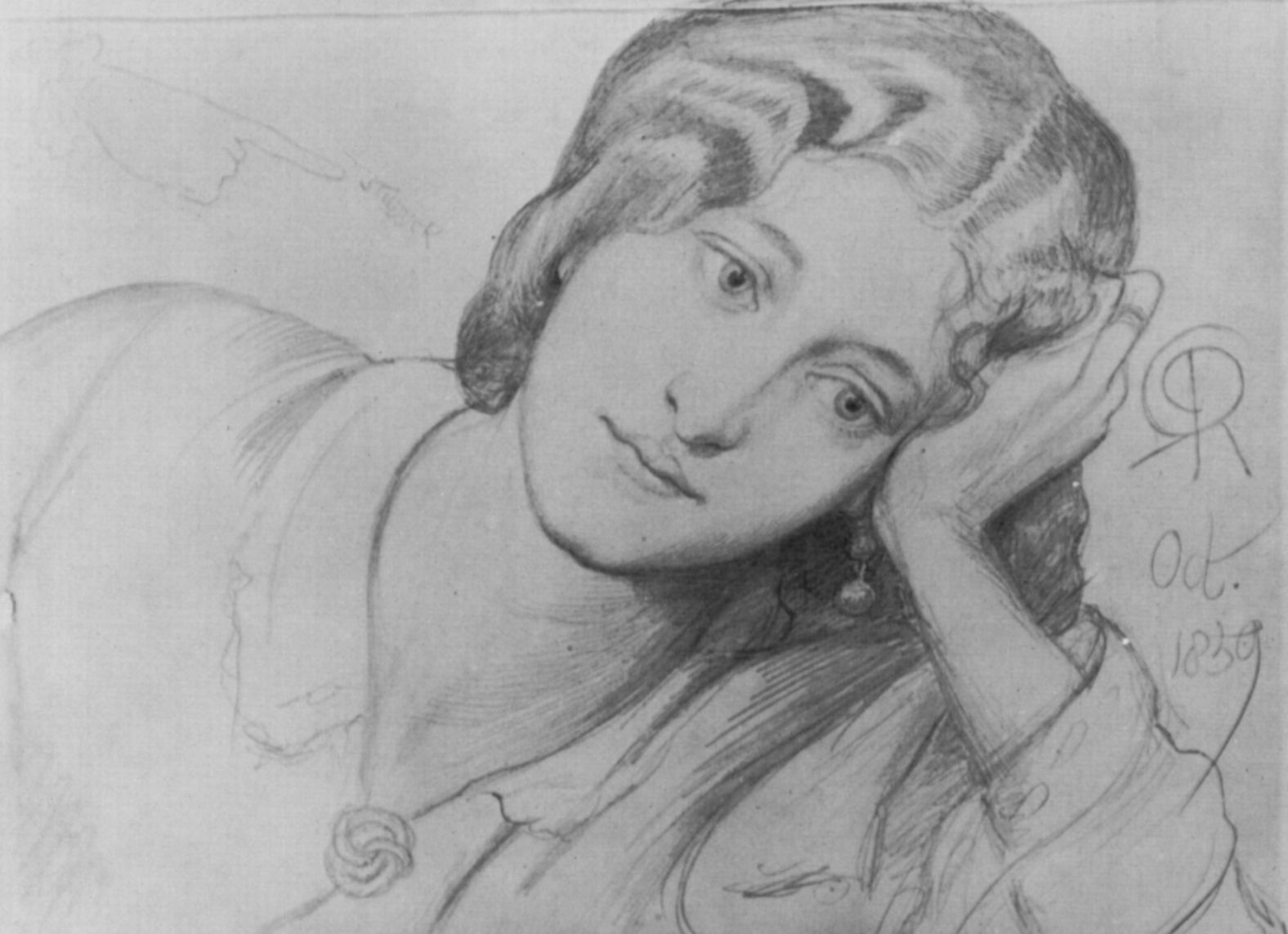
Ruth Herbert, lessee 1864–1868

Following this the theatre had a succession of managements. F. B. Chatterton became the lessee for two years from 1858. He presented a season, mainly of Shakespeare, by the popular actor Barry Sullivan, and staged F. C. Burnand's first major play, a burlesque called Dido, which ran for 80 performances. Alfred Wigan, who had been a member of Braham's original company, briefly took over the house in 1860, and was succeeded, equally briefly, by George Vining. Under Frank Matthews, who took over in December 1862, the theatre had its longest-running production thus far: Lady Audley's Secret, which ran for 104 nights. Matthews ended his tenancy in July 1863 and was followed by Benjamin Webster, who mounted a series of revivals and a few new burlesques and extravaganzas, which were financially unsuccessful.

A member of Webster's company, Ruth Herbert, took over in 1864 and ran the theatre until 1868. She attracted much praise for presenting Henry Irving in his first important appearance on a London stage. His performance in Dion Boucicault's Hunted Down in November 1866 caused a sensation. The following month the theatre presented W. S. Gilbert's first burlesque, Dulcamara! or, The Little Duck and the Great Quack, a parody of Donizetti's L'elisir d'amore, which ran until Easter the following year. The Herbert management ended in April 1868. The theatre historian W. J. MacQueen-Pope writes:

She had done nobly and had earned widespread praise. She had kept the theatre open and had brought at least two young people, both destined for greatness, to the notice of the London public – Henry Irving and Charles Wyndham. But the St James's had lost her a lot of money.

The season after her departure was notable for two Offenbach productions in which Hortense Schneider starred, bringing the Prince of Wales and London society to the theatre in June 1868. (Note: The two operas were La belle Hélène and La Grande-Duchesse de Gérolstein.)

=== Mrs John Wood; Marie Litton and others: 1869–1878 ===
After Mrs Wood's departure, the St James's stood empty for three years. Nobody wanted it. Money had been poured into it and had vanished like water … People now began to call it, not the St James's Theatre but Braham's Folly.

— W. J. MacQueen-Pope

In 1869 the theatre was taken by Mrs John Wood, whose first production was She Stoops to Conquer, which ran for 160 performances – a long run for the time. It was beaten by La Belle Sauvage which opened in November 1869 and ran for 197 nights. There were successful productions of John Poole's Paul Pry, Fernande (in which Fanny Brough made her London debut), Anne Bracegirdle, and Jenny Lind at Last. The theatre was well patronised and appeared to be finally prospering. But expenses outran receipts, and Wood gave up the management of the theatre in 1871, and went to the US to replenish her funds.

In 1875 another actress, Marie Litton, took the theatre. She had made her name in management, founding and running the Court Theatre, with which Gilbert's works had become closely, and profitably, associated. In one of her productions at the St James's, a work by Gilbert, Tom Cobb, was in a triple-bill with The Zoo, a short comic opera with music by Arthur Sullivan. (Note: This was an early, but not the first, example of Gilbert and Sullivan appearing on the bills together: their first collaborations, Thespis and Trial by Jury had already been presented.) Another of Litton's productions was a double bill of revivals of Frank Marshall's farce Brighton and William Brough's burlesque Conrad and Medora, in which she co-starred with Henrietta Hodson. When Litton left for another theatre in 1876, first Horace Wigan, and then Mrs John Wood made brief returns to management at the St James's, the latter with some success in The Danischeffs, which ran to good houses for more than 300 performances. She was succeeded by Samuel Hayes, who produced three failures in quick succession and then withdrew.

=== John Hare and the Kendals: 1879–1888 ===
John Hare; Madge Kendal and W. H. Kendal

The owner of the freehold of the theatre, Lord Newry, began to take an active interest in its affairs. He invited the actor John Hare to take over, which he did, in 1879, in partnership with two fellow-actors, Madge Kendal and her husband William. The theatre was again extensively renovated, with new decor by Walter Crane. The Era commented that the new management was in possession of "a house which, for taste and elegance, and comfort, is far in advance of anything the Metropolis has yet been able to boast."

A historian of the St James's, Barry Duncan, heads his chapter on this phase of the theatre's history, "John Hare and the Kendals: Nine Years of Steady Success". For the first time, the theatre's reputation as "unlucky" was steadily defied. (Note: The theatre had attracted this label as early as 1839 – "this very beautiful but most unlucky theatre" – and it continued throughout most of the 19th century: "an establishment long reputed the most unfortunate in London (1859); "this seemingly ill-fated place of amusement" (1875); "an unlucky one; its capacity was so small that [it did not pay] even with full houses" (1888); and even into George Alexander's highly successful tenure between 1891 and 1918 the label was still familiar.) The new lessees aimed both to amuse and to improve public taste, and in the view of the theatre historian J. P. Wearing, they achieved their aim, with a successful mixture of French adaptations and original English plays.

Under their management the St James's staged twenty-one plays: seven were new British pieces, eight French adaptations, and the rest were revivals. Their first production on 4 October 1879 was a revival of G. W. Godfrey's The Queen's Shilling. This was followed in December by Tennyson's The Falcon, based on the Decameron, in which Madge Kendal made a considerable successes as Lady Giovanna.

Wearing regards The Money Spinner (1881) as of particular importance to this period of the theatre's history, being the first of several of A. W. Pinero's plays staged there by Hare and the Kendals. It was regarded as daringly unconventional and a risky venture, but it caught on with the public, partly for Hare's character, the "disreputable but delightful old reprobate and card-shark" Baron Croodle. Other plays by Pinero given by the Hare-Kendal management at the St James's were The Squire (1881), The Ironmaster (1884), Mayfair (1885), and The Hobby Horse (1886).

B. C. Stephenson's comedy Impulse (1883) was a considerable success and was revived by public demand two months after the end of its first run. The reception of a rare excursion into Shakespeare, As You Like It (1885), was mixed. Hare's Touchstone was considered by some to be the worst ever seen, whereas Madge Kendal's Rosalind had always been one of her best-loved roles. Among the company in these years the actresses included Fanny Brough, Helen Maud Holt, and the young May Whitty; among their male colleagues were George Alexander, Allan Aynesworth, Albert Chevalier, Henry Kemble, William Terris, Brandon Thomas and Lewis Waller.

In a speech at the end of the final night of the Hare-Kendal management, Kendal commented that they had enjoyed more successes and fewer failures than managements of most theatres. But the St James's reputation for ill-luck was not yet finished.

=== Rutland Barrington; Lillie Langtry: 1888–1890 ===
The St James's in the late 19th century

In 1888 the comic singer and actor Rutland Barrington became lessee of the theatre. He recruited a talented company, giving Olga Nethersole, Julia Neilson, Allan Aynesworth and Lewis Waller their London debuts, but met financial disaster when his first two – and in the event his only – productions, The Dean's Daughter by Sydney Grundy and Brantinghame Hall by Gilbert, were both complete failures. Barrington lost £4,500, went bankrupt, and surrendered the lease in January 1889. The theatre stayed dark for the rest of the year.

Lillie Langtry took a year's lease from January 1890. She reopened the house on 24 February, playing Rosalind in a production of As You Like It attended by the Prince and Princess of Wales. She followed this with a melodramatic new play, Esther Sandraz, adapted from the French by Grundy, which played with a curtain-raiser, a musical farce by Burnand and Edward Solomon, The Tiger. Langtry fell ill with pleurisy and had to abandon the season in June. Arthur Bourchier, who had been playing in her company, took on the remainder of the lease, presenting Your Wife, an English version of a French farce, but poor box-office takings forced him to close the piece within a month. The lease was taken up by a French company who presented a season of plays in the latter months of the year. Poor attendance again forced the premature closure of the run.

=== George Alexander: 1890–1918 ===
Mrs Patrick Campbell and George Alexander in The Second Mrs Tanqueray, 1893

In 1891 the actor George Alexander, who had begun a managerial career a year earlier, took a lease of the St James's. He remained in charge there until his death in 1918. He redecorated it and had electric lighting installed. He opened with a double bill of comedies, Sunlight and Shadow and The Gay Lothario. He followed this with The Idler, by Haddon Chambers, a serious drama. It had already been a success in America and ran at the St James's through most of the remainder of the season, which concluded with a costume drama, Moliere, by Walter Frith. When Alexander took over the St James's he had only eleven years' professional experience in the theatre, but the historians J. P. Wearing and A. E. W. Mason both note that he had already reached a firm and enduring managerial policy. He sought to engage the best actors for his company: unlike some star actor-managers he did not wish to be supported by actors whose inferior talent would make the star look better. Among the actresses he engaged for his companies were Lilian Braithwaite, Constance Collier, Kate Cutler, Julia Neilson, Juliette Nesville, Marion Terry and Irene and Violet Vanbrugh. Their male colleagues included Arthur Bourchier, H. V. Esmond, Cyril Maude, Godfrey Tearle and Fred Terry.

Two key features of Alexander's management were his continual support of British playwrights; (Note: Wearing notes that of the eighty-one productions presented by Alexander at the St James's, only eight were by foreign writers.) and his care to avoid alienating his key clientele, the fashionable society audience. The writer Hesketh Pearson commented that Alexander catered to the tastes and foibles of London Society in its theatre-going just as the Savoy Hotel catered to them in restaurant-going.

Within a year of taking over the St James's, Alexander began a mutually beneficial professional association with Oscar Wilde, whose Lady Windermere's Fan he presented in February 1892. The following year he produced Pinero's, The Second Mrs Tanqueray, presented in May 1893. Like Lady Windermere's Fan it featured "a woman with a past", but unlike Wilde's play it ended in tragedy. It was thought daring at the time, but Alexander knew his audiences and kept to what Pearson called his "safe path of correct riskiness". It ran for 227 performances in its first production and was later much revived. The title role was first played by Mrs Patrick Campbell, who made her name in the part.

The Importance of Being Earnest in 1895, with Allan Aynesworth as Algernon (left) and George Alexander as Jack

Between Pinero's play and the work with which Alexander's name has become most closely associated – The Importance of Being Earnest – came Alexander's most conspicuous failure. The celebrated novelist Henry James had written a play, Guy Domville, about a hero who renounces the priesthood to save his family by marrying to produce an heir, but finally reverts to his religious calling. The play had been turned down by one London management, but Alexander took it on and opened it at the St James's on 5 January 1895. It was received politely by those in the more expensive parts of the house and impolitely by those in the cheaper seats. (Note: James wrote to his brother, "All the forces of civilization in the house waged a battle of the most gallant, prolonged & sustained applause with the hoots & jeers & catcalls of the roughs, whose roars (like those of a cage of beasts at some infernal 'Zoo') were only exacerbated (as it were!) by the conflict. It was a charming scene, as you may imagine, for a nervous, sensitive, exhausted author to face.) The reviews were unenthusiastic; Alexander kept the play on the bill for a month before turning to Wilde as a more theatrically adept writer.

In February 1895 Alexander presented Wilde's The Importance of Being Earnest. The success of the play with audiences and critics was immediate and considerable, but it was short-lived. Within weeks of the premiere Wilde was arrested on a charge of committing homosexual acts and was tried, convicted and imprisoned. The public turned against him, and although Alexander tried to keep the production of the play going by removing the author's name from the playbills, he had to withdraw it after 83 performances. Under Alexander, the St James's did not solely concentrate on drawing-room comedy and society drama. There were costume dramas, including the Ruritanian swashbuckler, The Prisoner of Zenda, which ran for 255 performances; and occasional ventures into Shakespeare, notably As You Like It, with Alexander as Orlando, Julia Neilson as Rosalind and a supporting cast that included C. Aubrey Smith, Bertram Wallis, H. B. Irving, Robert Loraine and H. V. Esmond.

At the end of 1899 Alexander closed the theatre to have it largely reconstructed, producing what The Era called "one of the handsomest temples of the drama in London", while retaining its charm and cosiness. The rebuilding provided increased seating capacity, which enhanced the financial viability of the theatre. The decor was by Percy Macquoid, carried out by the leading London decorators Messrs. Morant and Co. It reopened on 2 February 1900 with a performance of Rupert of Hentzau by Anthony Hope attended by the Prince of Wales. The Manchester Guardian agreed that the redeveloped theatre was "now one of the handsomest in London". Alexander's management continued into the new century, continuing to vary the repertory with, in 1902, a verse drama, Paolo and Francesca, based on an episode in Dante's The Divine Comedy, as well as the theatre's more usual fare such as Pinero's drama His House in Order, an artistic and box-office success, running for 427 performances. In 1909 Alexander successfully revived The Importance of Being Earnest, which ran for 316 performances. In 1913 he sub-let the theatre to Harley Granville Barker for four months. Among the novelties of that season was Bernard Shaw's Androcles and the Lion in 1913.

=== 1918–1939 ===
Henry Ainley, upstage, centre, as Mark Antony in Julius Caesar, 1920

After Alexander died in 1918, the lease was taken over by Gilbert Miller, an American impresario, who presented his own productions from time to time, but more often sub-let the theatre to other managers. The first was Gertrude Elliott who presented and starred in an American fantasy play, The Eyes of Youth, which ran for 383 performances. After this, Miller went into partnership with the actor Henry Ainley, and in 1920 they presented Julius Caesar, with Ainley as Mark Antony and a cast including Basil Gill, Claude Rains, Milton Rosmer and Lilian Braithwaite, which ran for 83 performances. There followed a succession of society dramas and light comedies including Polly With a Past (1921) in which many future stars appeared, including Helen Haye, Edith Evans and Noël Coward. In 1923 The Green Goddess, a melodrama by William Archer, started a run of 417 performances.

During the 1920s, the St James's staged Christmas seasons of Peter Pan with Peter played by Edna Best (1920 and 1922) and Jean Forbes-Robertson (1929), and Captain Hook by Ainley (1920), Ernest Thesiger (1921), Lyn Harding (1922), and Gerald du Maurier (1929).

In September 1925 du Maurier and Gladys Cooper took a sub-lease of the theatre to present The Last of Mrs Cheyney by Frederick Lonsdale (1925), which ran for 514 performances, until the end of 1926. Interference (1927), a thriller by Roland Pertwee and Harold Dearden, was another big success and ran for 412 performances. It was followed by a flop, S.O.S (1928), notable only for starring Gracie Fields in her first straight part. In 1929, Alfred Lunt made his London debut, starring with his wife Lynn Fontanne in Caprice, presented by C. B. Cochran, a comedy about a man, his two mistresses, and his son by one of them who falls in love with the other.

In the early 1930s there was a succession of failures or minimal successes until 1933, when Emlyn Williams's The Late Christopher Bean ran from May until September of the following year, with Edith Evans, Louise Hampton and Cedric Hardwicke. In 1936 the centenary of the theatre was marked by a lavishly staged adaptation of Pride and Prejudice, designed by Rex Whistler, which ran for nearly a year. It was presented by Miller in association with Max Gordon and starred Celia Johnson and Hugh Williams. Of the later productions during the 1930s only Golden Boy (1938) and Ladies in Retirement (1939) ran for more than 100 performances. (Note: Black Limelight, which opened at the St James's in 1937, soon transferred to the Duke of York's Theatre, where it ran for most of its 414 performances, leaving the St James's, in Mander and Mitchenson's phrase, "to have four flops in a row".)

=== 1940–1957 ===
At the outbreak of the Second World War theatres were temporarily closed by government decree. When they were permitted to reopen, a few weeks later, Ladies in Retirement resumed its run until the theatre was hit by a bomb in 1940. It did not reopen until March 1941. A brief season of ballet was followed by a Shakespeare and Ben Jonson season by Donald Wolfit and his company. In mid-1942 Coward's Blithe Spirit transferred from the Piccadilly Theatre; Coward took over the role of Charles Condomine from Cecil Parker prior to taking the play on tour. Wolfit and his company returned at the end of 1942 and played into the following year. Williams's adaptation of A Month in the Country starring Michael Redgrave ran for 313 performances for most of 1943. It was followed by Agatha Christie's Ten Little Niggers, which ran for 260 performances, interrupted when a bomb severely damaged the theatre in February 1944: the production moved temporarily to the Cambridge Theatre, returning in May to complete its run. Of productions of the later 1940s, few made much impression, with the exception of Adventure Story by Terence Rattigan (1949), starring Paul Scofield as Alexander the Great. The reviews were respectful, but the play ran for less than three months.

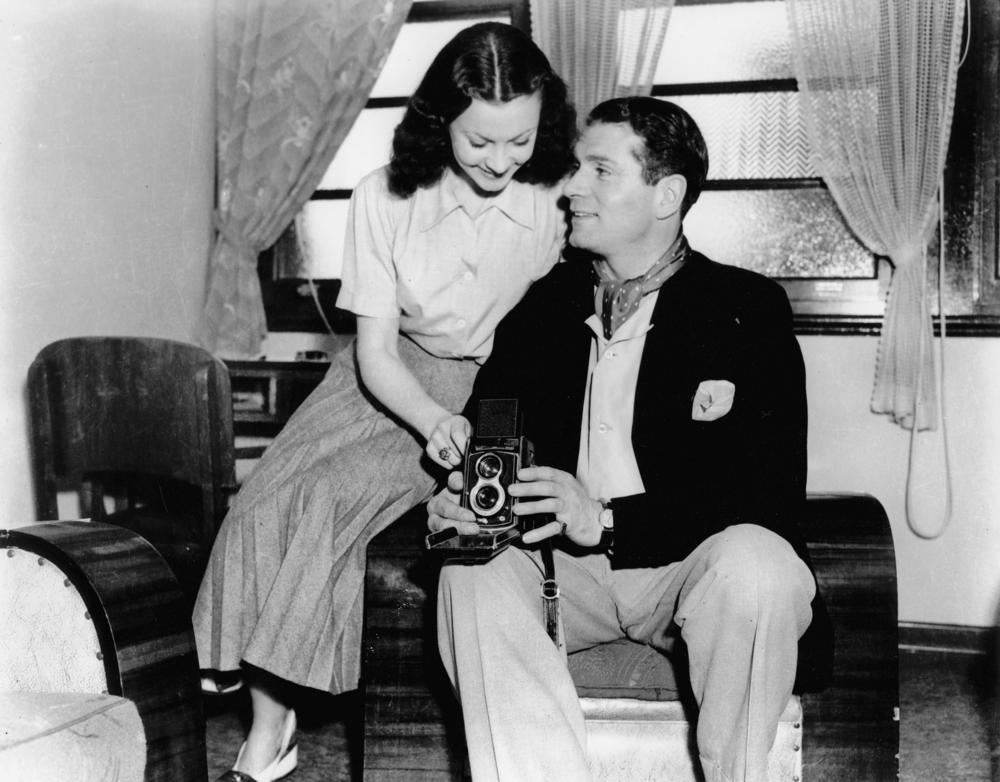
Vivien Leigh and Laurence Olivier (1948)

The critic Ivor Brown thought that Scofield's performance as Alexander, though excellent, owed something to the example of Laurence Olivier. In January 1950 Olivier and his wife Vivien Leigh took over the management of the theatre. They opened with Christopher Fry's new play, Venus Observed, in which Leigh did not appear. In 1951, for the Festival of Britain season, they starred in Shaw's Caesar and Cleopatra and Shakespeare's Antony and Cleopatra. Duncan observes, "The company was as brilliant as it was enormous." In addition to the Oliviers it included Robert Helpmann, Richard Goolden, Wilfrid Hyde-White and Peter Cushing among the men, and their female colleagues included Elspeth March, Maxine Audley and Jill Bennett.

Later that year, at Olivier's invitation, the French actors Jean-Louis Barrault and Madeleine Renaud presented a three-week season at the theatre with their own company. (Note: The repertoire consisted of Paul Claudel's Partage de Midi, Molière's Amphitryon and Les Fourberies de Scapin, Voltaire's Oedipe, Pierre de Marivaux' Les Fausses Confidences and the mime play Baptiste.) This was followed by Orson Welles in the title role of Othello, with Peter Finch as Iago and Gudrun Ure as Desdemona. In 1953 Olivier presented an Italian company headed by Ruggero Ruggeri in plays by Pirandello, and a short French season by the Comédie-Française.

In 1954 Rattigan's play, Separate Tables, began a run of 726 performances, the longest in the history of the St James's. The play starred Margaret Leighton and Eric Portman. During the run of Separate Tables it became known that a property developer had acquired the freehold of the theatre and had obtained the requisite permission from the London County Council (LCC) to demolish the building and replace it with an office block. Leigh and Olivier led a nationwide campaign to try to save the theatre. There were street marches and a protest in the House of Lords. A motion was carried against the Government in that house, but to no avail. The LCC ordered that no further theatres would be demolished in central London without a planned replacement, but neither the national nor the local government would intervene to prevent the destruction of the St James's. After the run of Separate Tables there were five short-lived productions at the theatre, (Note: The final productions, which according to Mander and Mitchenson "came and went in a half-hearted fashion", were Lesley Storm's The Long Echo (August 1956); Agatha Christie's Towards Zero (September 1956–March 1957); Roger MacDougall and Ted Allan's Double Image (from the Savoy, March–April); Jean Anouilh's The Restless Heart (May); and finally It's the Geography that Counts, a murder mystery by Raymond Bowers (June–July).) and the final performance there was given on 27 July 1957. In October the interior was stripped; in November the contents of the theatre were auctioned; and in December the demolition team moved in.

An office building, St James's House, was built on the site. It incorporated sculptured balcony fronts on each floor above the entrance. Four bas-relief panels by Edward Bainbridge Copnall depicted the heads of Gilbert Miller, George Alexander, Oscar Wilde and the Oliviers. The office building was demolished and a new one built on the site in the 1980s. The panels were moved from the King Street façade to the Angel Court side of the building.

== Notes, references and sources ==
=== Sources ===
- Barrington, Rutland (1908). Rutland Barrington: A Record of Thirty-Five Years' Experience on the English Stage: By Himself. London: Grant Richards. OCLC 7745426.
- Campbell, Edward; Peter O'Hagan (2016). Pierre Boulez Studies. Cambridge: Cambridge University Press. ISBN 978-1-107-06265-8.
- Duncan, Barry (1964). St James's Theatre, Its Strange and Complete History, 1835–1857. London: Barrie and Rockliff. OCLC 979694996.
- Mander, Raymond; Joe Mitchenson (1968). Lost Theatres of London. London: Rupert Hart-Davis. OCLC 41974.
- MacQueen-Pope, W. J. (1958). St James's: Theatre of Distinction. London: W. H. Allen. OCLC 314698001.
- Mason, A. E. W. (1935). Sir George Alexander and the St James' Theatre. London: Macmillan. OCLC 869837482.
- Parker, John, ed. (1925). Who's Who in the Theatre (fifth ed.). London: Sir Isaac Pitman and Sons. OCLC 10013159.
- Pearson, Hesketh (1922). Modern Men and Mummers. New York: Harcourt, Brace. OCLC 474214741.
- Raby, Peter (1998). The Cambridge Companion to Oscar Wilde. Cambridge: Cambridge University Press. ISBN 978-0-521-47471-9.
- Rollins, Cyril; R. John Witts (1962). The D'Oyly Carte Opera Company in Gilbert and Sullivan Operas: A Record of Productions, 1875–1961. London: Michael Joseph. OCLC 504581419.
- Schlicke, Paul (3 November 2011). The Oxford Companion to Charles Dickens. Oxford: Oxford University Press. ISBN 978-0-19-964018-8.
