= Arthur William à Beckett =

English journalist and intellectual (1844–1909)

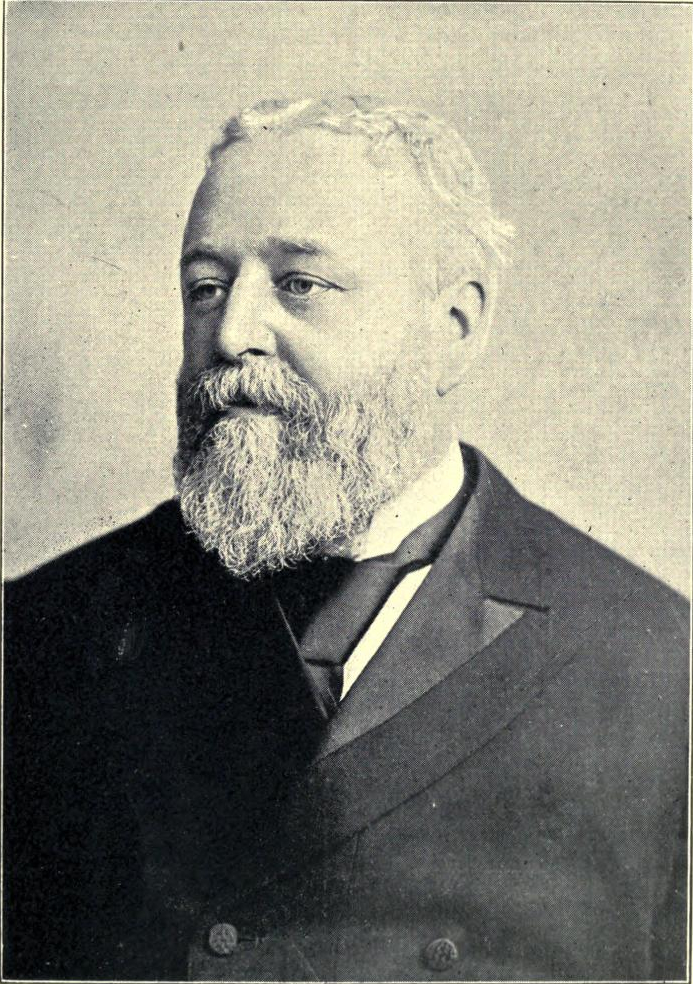
Beckett in 1896.

Arthur William à Beckett (25 October 1844 – 14 January 1909) was an English journalist and intellectual.

== Biography ==
He was a younger son of Gilbert Abbott à Beckett and Mary Anne à Beckett, brother of Gilbert Arthur à Beckett and educated at Felsted School. Besides fulfilling other journalistic engagements, Beckett founded The Tomahawk which ran from 1867 to 1870 Beckett was on the staff of Punch from 1874 to 1902, edited the Sunday Times 1891–1895, and the Naval and Military Magazine in 1896.

He gave an account of his father and his own reminiscences in The à Becketts of Punch (1903). A childhood friend (and distant relative) of W. S. Gilbert, Beckett briefly feuded with Gilbert in 1869, but the two patched up the friendship, and Gilbert even later collaborated on projects with Beckett's brother.

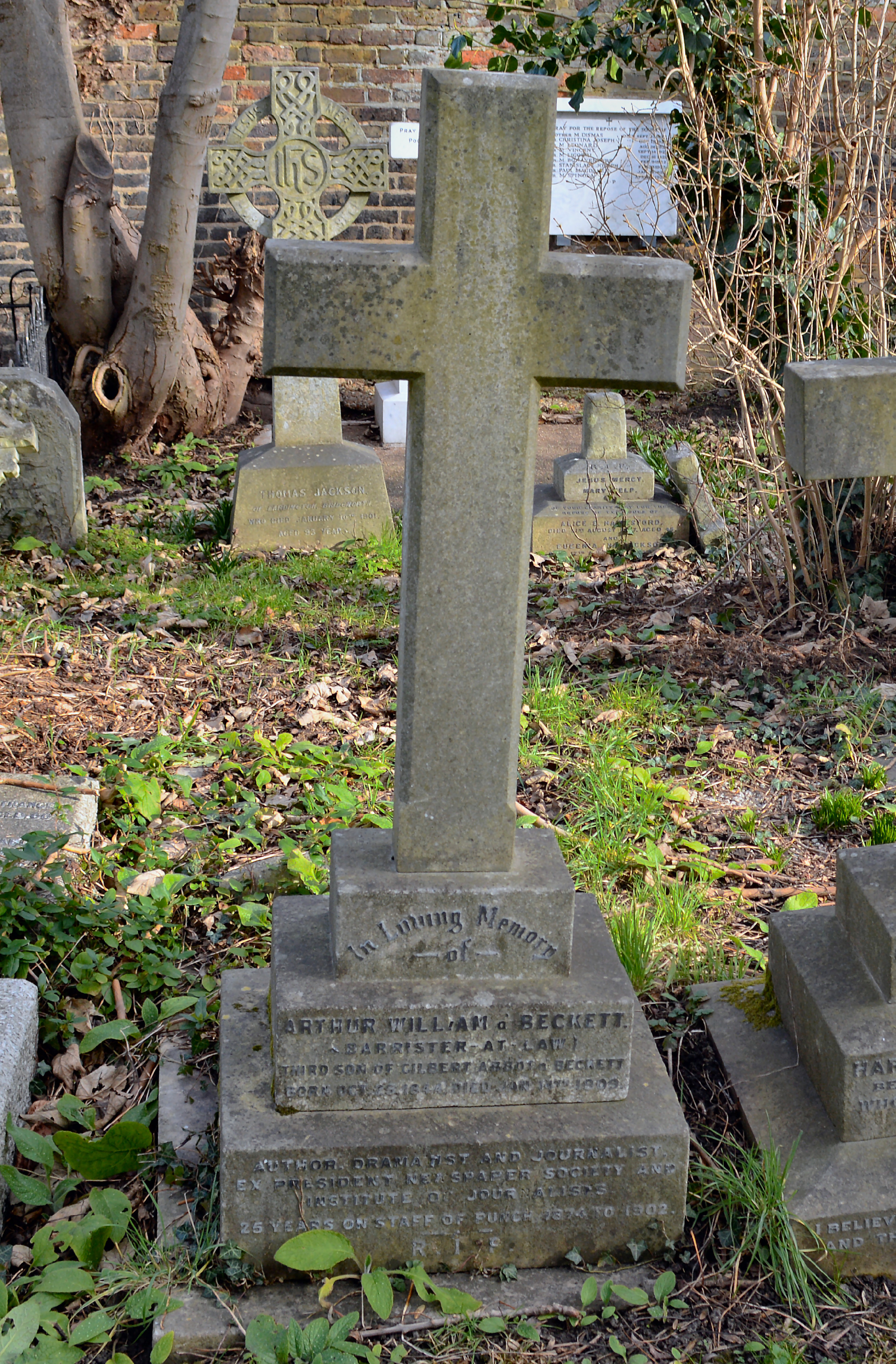
St Mary Magdalen, Mortlake

He was married to Suzanne Frances Winslow, daughter of the noted psychiatrist Forbes Benignus Winslow. He is buried in the churchyard at St Mary Magdalen, Mortlake.

== Works ==
He published:

- Comic Guide to the Royal Academy, with his brother Gilbert (1863–64)
- Fallen Amongst Thieves (1869)
- Our Holiday in the Highlands (1874)
- The Shadow Witness and The Doom of Saint Quirec, with Francis Burnand (1875–76)
- The Ghost of Greystone Grange (1877)
- The Mystery of Mostyn Manor (1878)
- Traded Out; Hard Luck; Stone Broke; Papers from Pump Handle Court, by a Briefless Barrister (1884)
- Modern Arabian Nights (1885)
- The Member for Wrottenborough (1895)
- Greenroom Recollections (1896)
- The Modern Adam (1899)
- London at the End of the Century (1900)
- With F. C. Burnand he co-authored:
  - The Doom of St. Querec (1875)
  - The Shadow Witness (1876)

He wrote for the theatre two three-act comedies:

- L.S.D. (Royalty Theatre, 1872);
- About Town (Court Theatre, 1873, it ran for over 150 nights);

and

- On Strike (Court Theatre, 1873, a domestic drama in one act);
- Faded Flowers (The Haymarket);
- Long Ago (Royalty Theatre, 1882);
- From Father to Son (Liverpool, 1881, a dramatised version of his novel Fallen among Thieves written in 3 acts in cooperation with J. Palgrave Simpson).

== Notes ==
Media offices
Preceded by Phil Robinson	Editor of The Sunday Times; 1890–1893	Succeeded by Rachel Beer
