= Gilbert Arthur à Beckett =

English writer

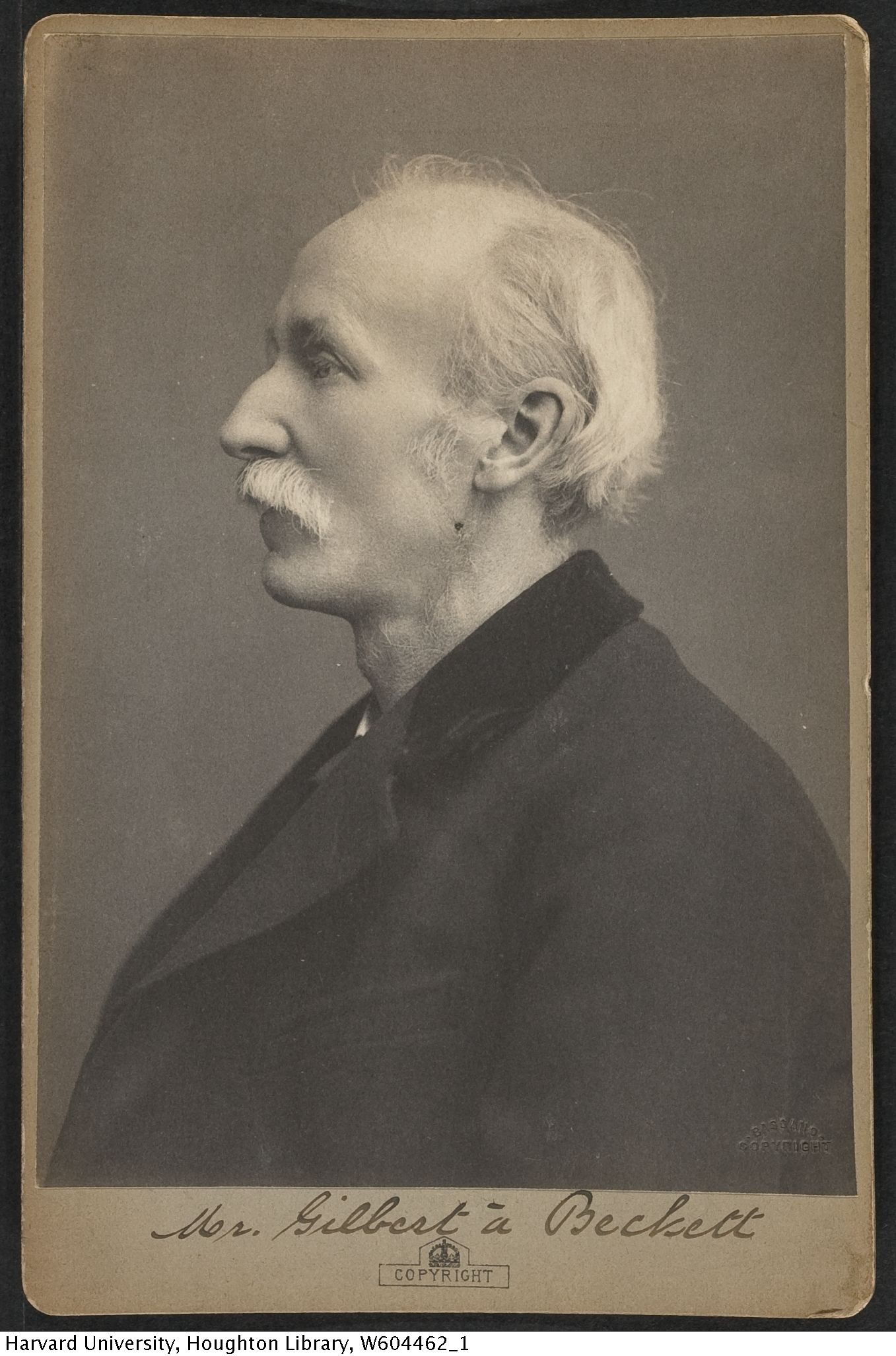
Gilbert Arthur à Beckett

Gilbert Arthur à Beckett (April 7, 1837 – October 15, 1891) was an English writer.

== Biography ==
Beckett was born at Portland House Hammersmith, on 7 April 1837, the eldest son of the civil servant and humorist Gilbert Abbott à Beckett and the composer Mary Anne à Beckett, daughter of Joseph Glossop, clerk of the cheque to the hon. corps of gentlemen-at-arms. His brother was Arthur William à Beckett. He graduated from Christ Church, Oxford, as a Westminster scholar in 1860. He was entered at Lincoln's Inn on 15 October 1857, but gave his attention chiefly to drama, producing Diamonds and Hearts at the Haymarket Theatre in 1867; this was followed by other light comedies. His adaptation of a French operetta by Émile Jonas called The Two Harlequins opened the new Gaiety Theatre, London in 1868, together with his distant cousin, W. S. Gilbert's, Robert the Devil and another piece.

Beckett's pieces include numerous burlesques and pantomimes, the libretti of Savonarola (Hamburg, 1884) and The Canterbury Pilgrims (Drury Lane, 1884) for the music of Dr. C. V. Stanford. With the composer Alfred Cellier, Beckett wrote the operetta Two Foster Brothers (St. George's Hall, 1877).

In 1879, he had been asked by Tom Taylor, the editor of Punch, to follow the example of his younger brother Arthur, and become a regular member of the staff of Punch. Three years later he was 'appointed to the Table.' The Punch dinners 'were his greatest pleasure, and he attended them with regularity, although the paralysis of the legs, the result of falling down the stairway of Gower Street station, rendered his locomotion, and especially the mounting of Mr. Punch's staircase, a matter of painful exertion'. To Punch he contributed both prose and verse; he wrote, in greater part, the admirable parody of a boy's sensational shocker (March 1882), and he developed Jerrold's idea of humorous bogus advertisements under the heading 'How we advertise now.' The idea of one of Sir John Tenniel's best cartoons for Punch, entitled 'Dropping the Pilot,' illustrative of Bismarck's resignation in 1889, was due to him.

Apart from his work on 'Punch,' he wrote songs and music for the German Reeds' entertainment, while in 1873 and 1874 he was collaborator in two dramatic productions which evoked a considerable amount of public attention.

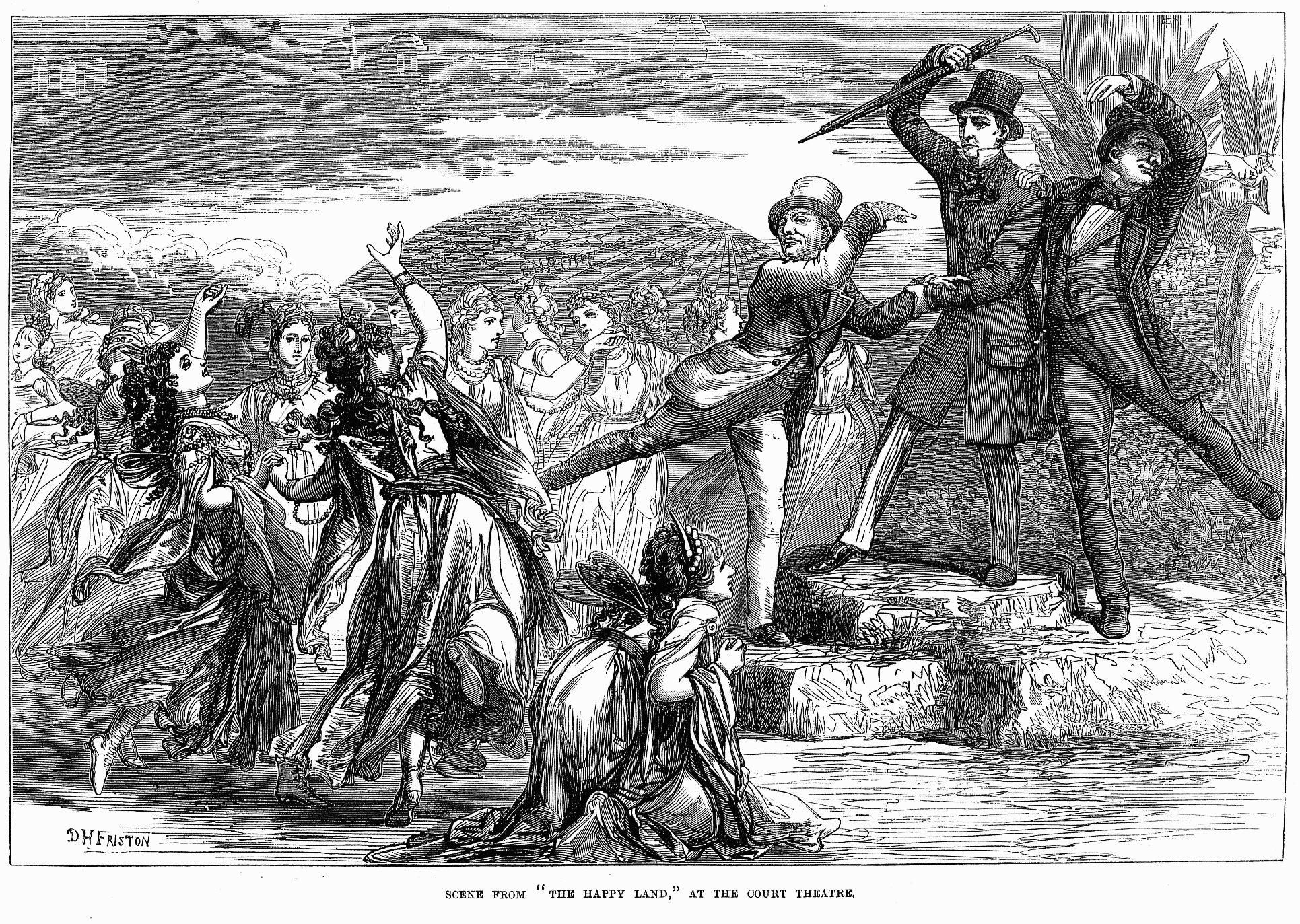
Scene from The Happy Land, showing the impersonation of Gladstone, Lowe, and Ayrton, from The Illustrated London News, March 22, 1873

On 3 March 1873, The Happy Land was given at the Court Theatre, 1873, a political satire and burlesque of W. S. Gilbert's The Wicked World written by Beckett and Gilbert (under a pseudonym). In this piece three statesmen (Gladstone, Lowe, and Ayrton) visit Fairyland to impart to the inhabitants the secrets of popular government. The actors representing 'Mr. G.,' 'Mr. L.,' and 'Mr. A.' were dressed so as to resemble the ministers satirised, and the representation elicited a question in the House of Commons and an official visit of the Lord Chamberlain to the theatre, with the result that the actors had to change their 'make-up.'

In the following year Beckett furnished the 'legend' to Herman Merivale's tragedy 'The White Pilgrim,' first given at the Court in February 1874. At the close of his life he furnished the lyrics and most of the book for the operetta La Cigale, which at the time of his death was nearing its four hundredth performance at the Lyric Theatre.

In 1889, he suffered a great shock from the death by drowning of his only son Beckett died in London on 15 October 1891 and was buried in Mortlake cemetery.

== Legacy ==
Punch devoted some appreciative stanzas to his memory, bearing the epigraph 'Wearing the white flower of a blameless life' (24 Oct. 1891). His portrait appeared in the well-known drawing of 'The Mahogany Tree' (Punch, Jubilee Number, 18 July 1887), and likenesses were also given in the 'Illustrated London News' and in Spielmann's 'History of Punch' (1895).

== Family ==
He married Emily, eldest daughter of William Hunt, J.P., of Bath, and his only daughter Minna married in 1896 Mr. Hugh Clifford, C.M.G., governor of Labuan and British North Borneo.
