= Woburn =

Woburn may refer to:

== Places ==
=== Canada ===
- Woburn, Toronto, Ontario, Canada
  - Woburn Collegiate Institute
  - Scarborough—Woburn, electoral district
- Woburn, Quebec, Canada

=== England ===
- Woburn, Bedfordshire
  - Woburn Abbey
  - Woburn Safari Park
- Woburn Sands, Buckinghamshire
- Woburn Golf and Country Club, in Little Brickhill, Buckinghamshire
- Woburn Place, London
- Woburn Square, London
- Woburn Walk, London

=== New Zealand ===
- Woburn, New Zealand

=== United States ===
- Woburn, Massachusetts, United States
  - Woburn Memorial High School
  - Woburn (MBTA station), a former station in the Boston area, closed in 1981
- Woburn, Illinois, United States
