= Michael Rophino Lacy =

Irish violinist and composer

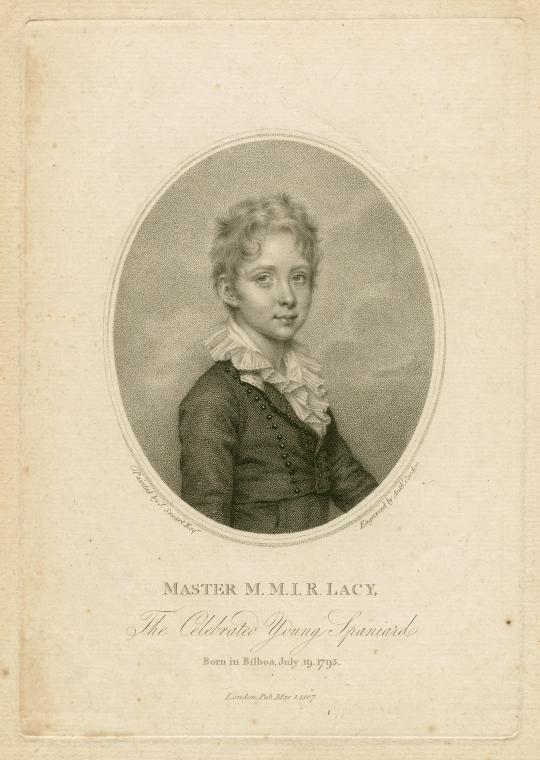

Background information
- Born: 19 July 1795; Bilbao, Spain
- Died: 20 September 1867 (aged 72) London, England
- Occupations: Violinist, composer
- Instrument: Violin

Michael Rophino Lacy (19 July 1795 – 20 September 1867) was an Irish violinist and composer.

The son of an Irish merchant in Bilbao, Spain, he appeared first there in public as a six-year-old prodigy. In 1802 he was sent to Bordeaux and a year later to Paris to study with Rodolphe Kreutzer. As Le Petit Espagnol he performed before Napoleon towards the end of 1804 and by October 1805 in London as "The Young Spaniard", his real name not being disclosed before 1807. He performed in Dublin in 1807 alongside Angelica Catalani in Michael Kelly's opera company, and returned there in 1813. He enjoyed a short career as an actor in comedy roles, performing in Dublin, Edinburgh and Glasgow, but in 1818 resumed the musical profession, and by 1820 became leader of the ballet at the Kings theatre, London. He composed or adapted from other composers a number of operas and an oratorio, The Israelites in Egypt (1833), in which he combined the plots of Handel's Israel in Egypt and Rossini's Mosè in Egitto.

"Lacy's contemporary fame rested mainly on his rather free English adaptations of French and Italian operas by Auber, Mozart, Rossini and others, which he produced between 1827 and 1833." Lacy died in London.
