= John Braham (tenor) =

English tenor opera singer

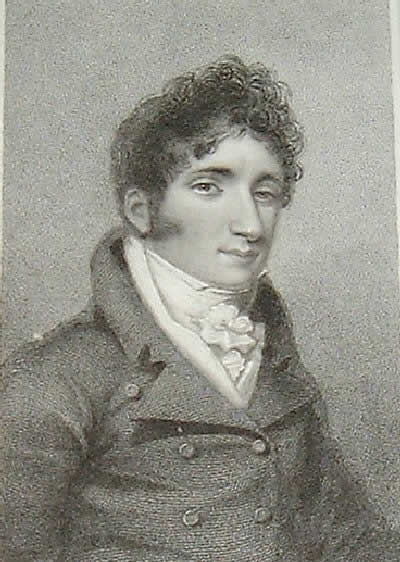
John Braham as "Lord Aimworth", steel line engraving by Thomson/Foster, 1818

John Braham (c. 1774 – 17 February 1856) was an English tenor opera singer born in London. His long career led him to become one of Europe's leading opera stars. He also wrote a number of songs, of minor importance, although "The Death of Nelson" is still remembered. His success, and that of his offspring in marrying into the British aristocracy, are also notable examples of Jewish social mobility in the early 19th century.

== Origins ==
Braham's precise origins are uncertain. The favoured (but specious) present account in contemporary sources of reference is that he was possibly a son of John Abraham or Abrahams, who was possibly an operative at the Drury Lane Theatre who died in 1779 and his wife, who may have been Esther, who may have been a sister of the hazzan at the Great Synagogue of London, Myer Lyon. Braham has also been held to be related to various other London musicians with the surname of Abrahams. There is however no documentary evidence for any of these supposed connections.

It is however fairly certain that Braham was left an orphan at an early age. There are stories of his selling pencils in the street as an urchin (a common trade for the Jewish poor at the time). Braham was a meshorrer (descant singer) at the Great Synagogue, and here his abilities were noted by Lyon, who led a double life as an operatic tenor at the theatre at Covent Garden (under the name of Michaele Leoni).

== Early career ==
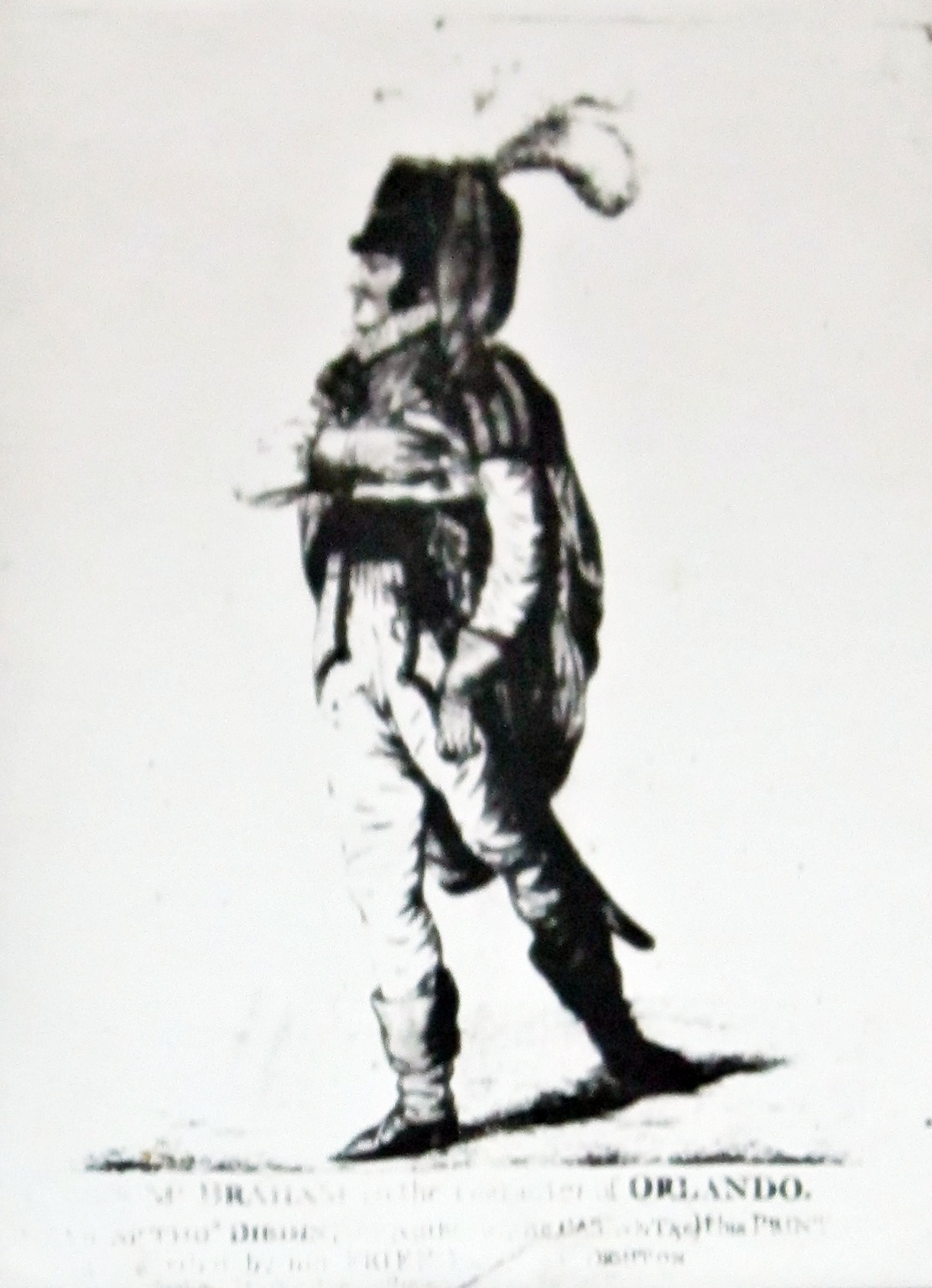
John Braham, an etching by Robert Dighton

Braham's first stage appearance was in fact at Leoni's Covent Garden 1787 benefit, when he sang Thomas Arne's The soldier tir’d of war’s alarms. He next appeared in June at the Royalty Theatre, again with Leoni.

After 1788, however, nothing hear of a public performance until Braham appeared at Bath under the aegis of his teacher, the male soprano Venanzio Rauzzini in 1794. This empty period will have coincided with the departure of Leoni and also with Braham's voice breaking. It also therefore suggests a birthdate of around 1774 or 1775, rather than the 1777 date given by nearly all modern sources. During this period, he was supported by the Goldsmid family. The Goldsmids were influential financiers who maintained their friendship with Braham later in his career and also had him entertain at their soirées. Their neighbour and occasional guest there was Horatio Nelson, whose later fate was to prompt Braham's greatest song-writing success, "The Death of Nelson". (It was first sung in the opera The Americans at the (Lyceum Theatre in 1811. Lady Hamilton, who was in a private box for the performance, was reported to have been so overcome that she suffered a fit of hysterics and had to leave the theatre.)

Braham was trained by Rauzzini from 1794 to 1796. It is very likely that the Goldsmids paid for Braham to be articled to Rauzzini, who was a leader in Bath's musical society. Rauzzini's other pupils included the celebrated Irish tenor Michael Kelly, creator of Don Basilio in Mozart's Marriage of Figaro. Braham certainly benefited from Rauzzini's influence and promotion, and acquired from him the basic precepts of the old Italian school and a virtuoso technique which was thought by some to be surpassed only by the soprano Angelica Catalani.

After his first performance at Bath in 1794, the Bath Chronicle eulogised him as 'a sweet singer of Israel' and explained that he "derived […] from the synagogue, though by the simple expedient of dropping the A at the beginning of his name, he got rid of the patriarchal appellation and Christianized himself." At this point, despite the implications of the article, Braham had made no moves toward conversion, although he may well have attended church as required by social custom of the time.

== Braham and the Storaces ==
This 1794 performance also marked Braham's first encounter with the Storace family. Stephen Storace (1762–1796), the son of an Italian musician based in Dublin, was an accomplished composer; and his sister Anna, known as Nancy (1765–1817), formerly also a student of Rauzzini, a talented soprano. They had already had much experience in Italy and in Vienna, where in 1786 Nancy created the first Susanna in Mozart's Figaro, and both had been friends of the composer. In Vienna Nancy had contracted an unfortunate marriage with the psychopathic English composer John Abraham Fisher, from whom she soon separated. At Braham's début, which was the first of the season at Bath, Nancy also performed, as a soloist and in a duet with him. It was the starting-point of a liaison which was to last for over twenty years, during which Nancy bore Braham a son, Spencer.

Stephen invited Braham to take the lead role in his new opera Mahmoud in 1796; Braham triumphed at the première. Later that year he sang lead roles, also to acclaim, at the Italian Opera in London, an extraordinary attainment for a Briton. In 1797 he appeared in the role created for his mentor Leoni, as Carlos in Sheridan's The Duenna at Covent Garden. The long triumphant phase of Braham's career was launched, which in its early years saw him and Nancy singing in every major continental house as well as in Britain, to audiences which included, in Paris (1797), Napoleon, in Livorno (1799), Nelson, and similar notables wherever else they appeared. Braham became the first English male singer to command a European reputation. In 1809 he sang in Dublin at the unheard of fee of 2000 guineas for fifteen concerts, an indisputable sign both of his fame and popularity, and of the growth of music and entertainment as industries in this period.

== Braham the Jew ==
However, both by his own choice and by the sentiments of his audiences in England, Braham's Jewishness remained a prominent feature of his career until his marriage in 1816, and as the most famous English Jew of this period he became a significant incarnation of 'the Jew' in the British consciousness. He also regularly supported Jewish charities and causes.

Braham's physical appearance made it in any case difficult to disguise his origins, being short, stocky, swarthy and in general the epitome of a caricature Jew. The quality of his singing rendered his looks irrelevant to his audience; as was unpleasantly expressed by the satirist John Williams, who at the end of a long catalogue of supposed Jewish malpractices and some lubricious references to Braham's supposed venery, concludes his passage:

His voice and his judgement completely atone

For that heap of repulsion he cannot disown.

[...] When he breathes his divisions and liquidly soars,

'Frigid Science first hears, then bows low and adores!

The writer and essayist Charles Lamb was effusive, if patronising, about Braham in a letter of 1808:

Do you like Braham’s singing. The little Jew has bewitched me. I follow him like as the boys follow Tom the Piper. He cures me of melancholy as David cured Saul […]Braham’s singing when it is impassion’d is finer than Mrs. Siddons or Mr. Kemble's acting & when it is not impassion'd it [is] as good as hearing a person of fine sense talking. The brave little Jew!

In his published essays, however, Lamb, whilst continuing to profess admiration for Braham, lets his prejudices loose. His attitude does not differ much, in fact, from that of Williams already referred to, accepting Braham's talents only in the context of supposed distasteful practices of his people. In his essay Imperfect Sympathies published in 1821, he wrote:

B–[raham] would have been more in keeping if he had abided by the faith of his forefathers. There is a fine scorn in his face, which nature meant to be of – Christians. The Hebrew spirit is strong in him, in spite of his proselytism. He cannot conquer the Shibboleth. How it breaks out, when he sings, "The Children of Israel passed through the Red Sea!" The auditors, for the moment, are as Egyptians to him, and he rides over our necks in triumph. There is no mistaking him. – B– has a strong expression of sense in his countenance, and it is confirmed by his singing. The foundation of his vocal excellence is use. He sings with understanding, as Kemble delivered dialogue. He would sing the Commandments, and give an appropriate character to each prohibition.

== Braham’s marriage ==
Lamb had earlier attacked Braham rather more personally, and at some length, in the essay The Religion of Actors, not subsequently collected into the 'Elia' series.

A celebrated performer has seen fit to oblige the world with a confession of his faith; or, Br–'s RELIGIO DRAMATICI. This gentleman, in his laudable attempt to shift from his person the obloquy of Judaism, with the forwardness of a new convert, in trying to prove too much, has, in the opinion of many, proved too little. A simple declaration of his Christianity was sufficient; but, strange to say, his apology has not a word about it. [….] We can do no less than congratulate the general state of Christendom upon the accession of so extraordinary a convert.

It is not known to what statement by Braham Lamb refers in this passage; no document or publication has been identified in which Braham writes of his religion. Nor, as Lamb hints, is there any evidence of Braham's actual conversion. However the passage is undoubtedly associated with Braham's marriage to (the Gentile) Miss Bolton of Manchester in 1816. This followed a traumatic period for Braham in which his personal affairs were often before the public. Having fallen out with, and abandoned, Nancy Storace, he had travelled to France in 1815 with a Mrs. Wright, whose husband sued him for criminal conversation (and eventually was awarded £1000). While the suit was pending, Braham had the unusual experience of being hissed at during a performance of Handel's Israel in Egypt (the very piece cited by Lamb in his 1821 essay), on which he stepped forward and addressed the audience:

I am now before you in a public character. If, in that situation, I have given you offence, you have an undoubted right to call for an apology or defence; but if I have erred as a private individual, the nature of that error cannot with discretion come under your notice. It will probably be investigated by a court, constituted to hear both the accuser and the accused, and where justice only can be done.

== Contemporary assessments of Braham’s singing ==
Lamb clearly carried some baggage regarding Judaism which was not shared by (or at least not as evident in) most other writers of the time; on the three occasions he mentions Braham the latter's Jewish origin is always prominent. Lamb's friend Leigh Hunt admittedly takes the opportunity for some snide comments in his memories of Braham from the retrospect of 1850, when

from [the] wonderful remains of power in his old age we may judge what he must have been in his prime. […]He had wonderful execution as well as force, and his voice could also be very sweet, though it was too apt to betray something of the nasal tone which has been observed in Jews, and which is, perhaps […] a habit in which they have been brought up […] it might not be difficult to trace it to moral, and even to monied, causes; those, to wit, that induce people to retreat inwardly upon themselves; into a sense of their shrewdness and resources; and to clap their finger in self-congratulation upon the organ through which it pleases them occasionally to intimate as much to a bystander, not choosing to trust it wholly to the mouth.

Other writers, such as Crabb Robinson or Mount Edgcumbe, mention Braham frequently without reference to his religion. Robinson writes in 1811:

His trills, shakes and quavers are, like those of all the other great singers, tiresome to me; but his pure melody, the simple song clearly articulated, is equal to anything I ever heard. His song was acted as well as sung delightfully; I think Braham a fine actor while singing; he throws his soul into his throat, but his whole frame is animated, and his gestures and looks are equally impassioned.

Mount Edgcumbe, in his memoirs, discriminates Braham's styles more closely:

All must acknowledge that his voice is of the finest quality […] he has great knowledge of music and can sing extremely well. It is therefore the more to be regretted that he should ever do otherwise, that he should ever quit the normal register of his voice by raising it to an unpleasant falsetto […], that he should depart from a good style and correct taste […] to adopt at times the over-florid and frittered Italian manner; at others, to fall into the coarseness and vulgarity of the English. The fact is, he can be two different singers according to the audience before whom he performs, and that to gain applause he condescends to sing as ill at the playhouse as he has done well at the opera.

In 1826 a writer in the Quarterly Musical Magazine and Review, in a letter entitled 'Foreign Instruction and English Judgement', states:

We have no English male vocalist who is entitled to the character of impassioned but Braham […] I remember Braham before he went to Italy [i.e. before 1798]. He was bred in the Italian school, but though he sung with great feeling, he was young and exhibited more of what I would call instrumentation than mind before he went abroad.

All this is further evidence that Braham's singing showed similar traces of 'otherness' to that of Leoni, whose use of falsetto was also characteristic, and that this relic of Braham's early training was amongst the factors enabling him to present a singing style clearly demarcated, for the cognoscenti, from both the prevalent Italian and home-grown English styles.

It further indicates that Braham was very conscious of his market, more so than he was for the purity of his art. In this of course he was no different from his many Gentile colleagues, and Mount Edgcumbe deplores him for his betrayal of art, not for his origins. However similar arguments against other musicians of Jewish origin were however also later to be given specific anti-Jewish spins in continental Europe.

== Braham's later career ==
Following his marriage, Braham seems to have brought to a close any overt identification with the Jewish community. After this date, there are no appearances at Jewish charities or functions. This withdrawal also follows the publication of Byron's and Nathan's Hebrew Melodies, to which he had lent his name (although he had no part in creating them) in return for a share of the profits. Despite the intention that Braham would publicise the songs, there seems to be no record of his ever having performed them. His marriage and the vehement anti-Jewish reviews which Byron's poetry received may have both provided significant disincentives to do so. Although Nathan's first edition of the Melodies seems to have been profitable, Braham declined lending his name on the same terms to the second edition in 1824. Thus the year 1816 marks the turning of the tide as regards Braham's self-identification. Leigh Hunt, writing in 1850, gives an ironic indication of Braham's eventual Anglicization, dropping many of his Jewish mannerisms:

Byron would pleasantly pretend that Braham called 'enthusiasm' entoozy-moozy; and in the extraordinary combination of lightness, haste, indifference and fervour with which he would pitch out that single word from his lips, accompanied with a gesture to correspond, he would really set before you the admirable singer in one of his (then) characteristic passages of stage dialogue. He did not live to see Braham become an exception in his dialogue as in his singing.

Despite the dip in public support when he broke with Storace, Braham's reputation remained strong until at least the mid-1820s, when he created in London the role of Huon in Weber's opera Oberon and sang in Mozart's Requiem at Weber's funeral service not long afterwards (June 1826). In the 1830s critics began to dispute whether his voice still served, and he began to abandon tenor roles for baritone parts. Poor investments, including an unhappy venture into theatre management at the St. James's Theatre, which he built in 1835, meant that he was forced to continue to exploit his reputation long after his voice could justify it, at times retiring to the continent to avoid bankruptcy proceedings.

In 1840 he sang in Mendelssohn's Lobgesang (Second Symphony) at Birmingham under the composer's baton, and subsequently undertook a tour of America with his son Charles Braham. His last public performance was given in London in March 1852 (that is, when he was probably 78 years old) and he died there on 16 February 1856.

He also worked as a singing teacher. Two of his notable pupils included mezzo-soprano Adelaide Kemble and soprano Fanny Corri-Paltoni.

Braham continued to be dogged by the aftermath of the Storace affair, most notably through the antipathy, (fuelled by personal enemies), of his son by Storace, Spencer. Spencer ended up, having taken the surname Meadowes, as a canon of Canterbury Cathedral.

== Braham’s family ==
Most notable of his children was his eldest daughter Frances (1821–1879). In a sequence of four brilliant marriages she wedded the eldest, but illegitimate, son of the 6th Earl Waldegrave; then his brother, the 7th Earl; the elderly, wealthy and well-connected politician George Harcourt (1785–1861); and, finally, the politically ambitious Chichester Fortescue, later Lord Carlingford. (Asked once on which day of the week she had been married, she allegedly replied 'Oh, my dear, I have been married nearly every day of the week'). Restoring, with Harcourt, Horace Walpole's Strawberry Hill estate, which she had inherited from the Waldegraves, she became one of the leading society and political hostesses of her era. Gladstone, Disraeli, the Prince and Princess of Wales and the Duc d'Aumale, youngest son of Louis-Philippe, were all frequent guests. She was also a friend and patroness of the nonsense pioneer, Edward Lear. Her wealth enabled her to bail out her father and her various siblings on sundry occasions.

But Frances's marriages were not the family's only social coup. Charles Braham's daughter Constance was married, with some help from her aunt, to Edward Strachey, later first Baron Strachie.

The social transformation that had been achieved within a generation, the foundation of which was Braham's reputation and achievement as a musician, is obvious.

== Legacy as a singer ==
The tenor Michael Kelly, who had a long professional association with Braham, remarked in 1826 that 'he is, decidedly, the greatest vocalist of his day.' John Braham became seen (retrospectively) as the founder of a dynasty of leading British tenors of the concert and oratorio stage. His immediate successor was the Englishman John Sims Reeves who sang into the 1880s. Reeves was succeeded by Edward Lloyd, who between 1874 and his retirement in 1900 took part in every Handel Triennial Festival at the Crystal Palace. Braham's 'Death of Nelson' remained in Lloyd's repertoire during the 1900s: in Lloyd's declamatory style, ringing but without much vibrato, there may be an echo of the stentorian style of Braham himself. In the early twentieth century the declamatory delivery in Handel's music was maintained by Walter Widdop and Joseph Hislop among others.

== Compositions ==
John Braham’s compositions belong stylistically to the early Romantic period, rooted in the late Classical tradition of English opera and concert song. His works reflect the transitional style of the early nineteenth century, combining Classical clarity with the expressive lyricism and vocal virtuosity characteristic of Romantic taste. Here is an incomplete list of compositions of John Braham:

- The Cabinet (1802)
- Family Quarrels (1802)
- The English Fleet in 1342 (1803)
- Thirty Thousand, or Who's the richest? (1804)
- Out of Place, or The Lake of Lausanne (1805)
- False Alarms, or My Cousin (1807)
- Kais, or The Love in a Desert (1808)
- The Americans (1812)
- Narensky, or The Road to Yaroslav (1814)
- Zuma, or The Three of Health (1818)
- The death of Weber (1826), for voice and piano
- Isidore de Merida, or The Devil's Creek (1827)
- The Taming of the Shrew (1828)

== Sources ==
- David Conway, Jewry in Music, (Cambridge University Press, 2011) ISBN 978-1-107-01538-8
- Leigh Hunt, ed. J. Morpurgo, Autobiography, London, 1949
- K. James, 'Concert Life in Eighteenth-Century Bath', unpublished PhD dissertation, London University (1987)
- Charles Lamb, ed. Phillip Lopate, Essays of Elia, University of Iowa Press, 2003
- Charles and Mary Lamb, ed. E. W. Marrs, The Letters of Charles and Mary Lamb, (3 vols), Cornell University Press, 1975–8.
- Charles and Mary Lamb, ed. E. V. Lucas, The Works of Charles and Mary Lamb, 7 vols, Methuen, 1903–5.
- J. M. Levien, The Singing of John Braham (London 1944).
- M. Scott, The Record of Singing to 1914 (Duckworth 1977), 48–49.
- John Williams, The Pin-Basket to the Children of Thespis, (London, 1797)
