= Gilbert Abbott à Beckett =

English barrister and humorist (1811–1856)

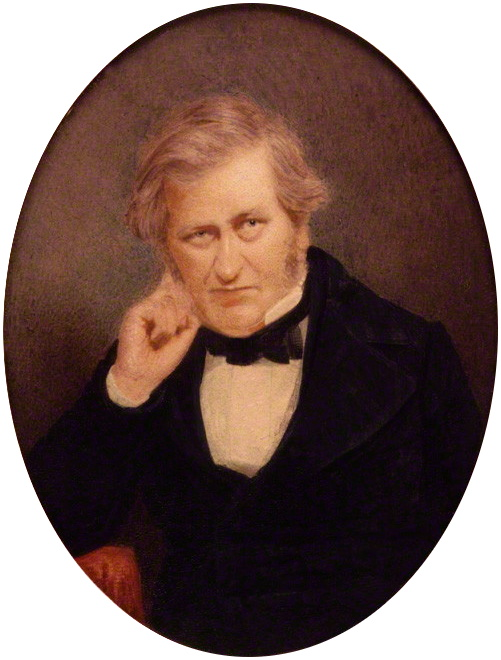
- Born: 9 January 1811; London, England
- Died: 30 August 1856 (aged 45); Boulogne-sur-Mer, France
- Resting place: Highgate Cemetery
- Occupations: Lawyer, humorist writer

Gilbert Abbott à Beckett (9 January 1811 – 30 August 1856) was an English humorist.

== Biography ==
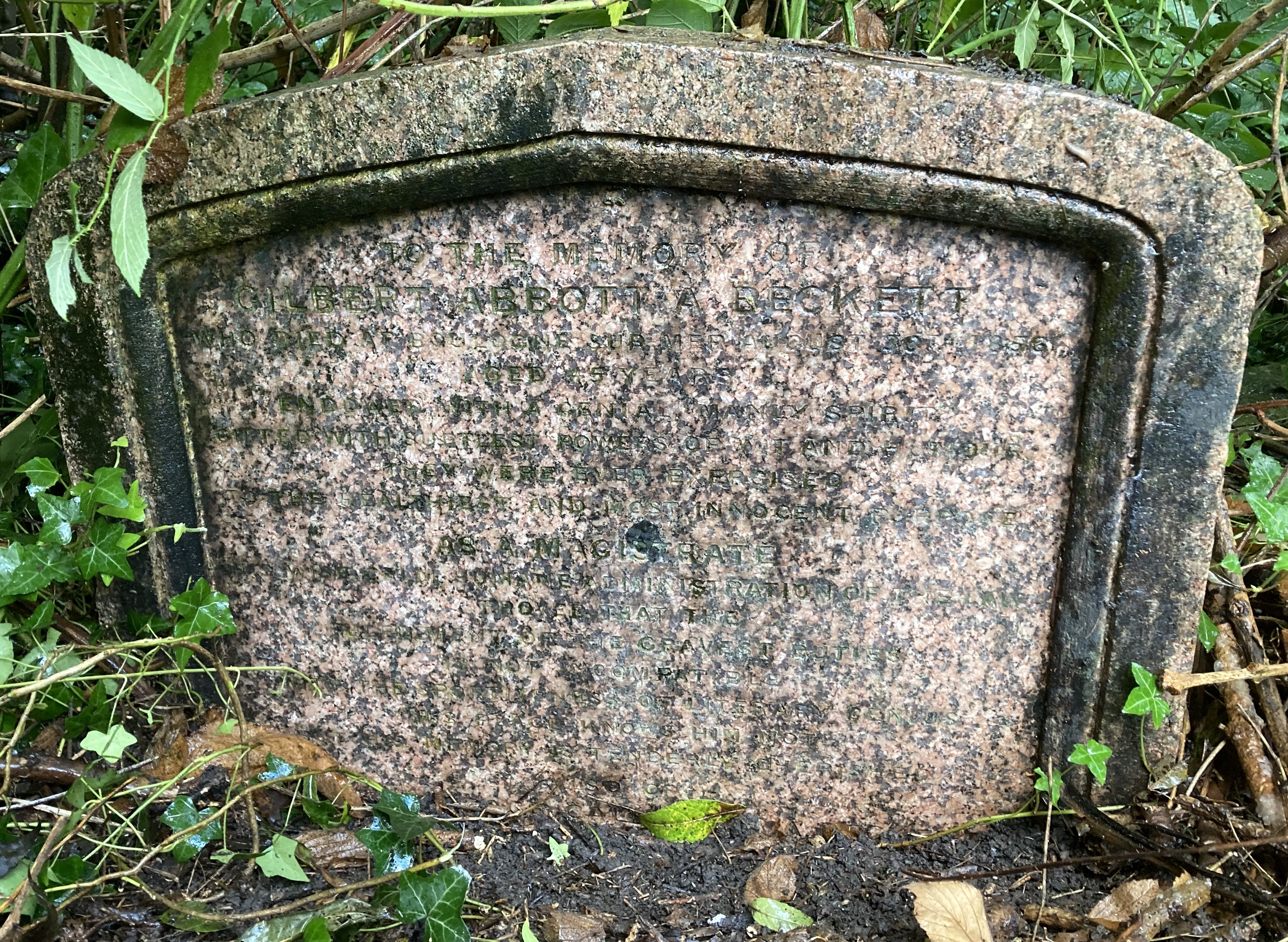
Grave of Gilbert Abbot a Beckett in Highgate Cemetery

He was born in London, the son of solicitor William à Beckett, and belonged to a family claiming descent from Thomas Becket. He was educated at Westminster School and was called to the bar at Gray's Inn in 1841.

He edited the comic paper Figaro in London and was one of the original staff of Punch and a contributor until his death. He was an active journalist on The Times and The Morning Herald, contributed a series of light articles to the Illustrated London News, conducted in 1846 The Almanack of the Month and found time to produce some fifty or sixty plays, among them dramatized versions of Charles Dickens's shorter stories, written in collaboration with Mark Lemon. He is perhaps best known as the author of The Comic History of England (1847–48), The Comic History of Rome (1852) and a Comic Blackstone (1846). He wrote the book for two operas with music composed by his wife Mary Anne à Beckett (née Glossop), Agnes Sorrel and Red Riding Hood.

As poor-law commissioner he presented a valuable report to the Home Secretary regarding the Andover workhouse scandal, and in 1849 he became a metropolitan police magistrate.

He died in Boulogne-sur-Mer, France, of typhoid fever and is buried on the western side of Highgate Cemetery (plot no.7604), above and to the far left of the colonnade in the courtyard.

His elder brother, Sir William à Beckett (1806–1869), became chief justice of Victoria, Australia.

He was the father of two other Victorian writers, Gilbert Arthur à Beckett and Arthur William à Beckett.

== Works ==
- The King Incog (1834)
- The Revolt of The Work-House (1834)
- The Man With the Carpet Bag (1835)
- Posthumous Papers of the Wonderful Discovery Club (1838) (written as POZ)
- The Chimes (1844) (with Mark Lemon)
- Scenes from the Rejected Comedies (1844)
- Hop O' My Thumb (1844) (written as POZ)
- Comic Blackstone (1844)
- Timour; or, The Cream of Tartar (1845)
- The Comic History of England (1847–48)
- The Comic History of Rome (1851)
- Sardanapalus; or, The 'Fast' King of Assyria (1853)
- The Fiddle Faddle Fashion Book (written as POZ)
