= Chapman baronets of Cleadon (1958) =

Baronetcy in the Baronetage of the United Kingdom

Chapman baronets
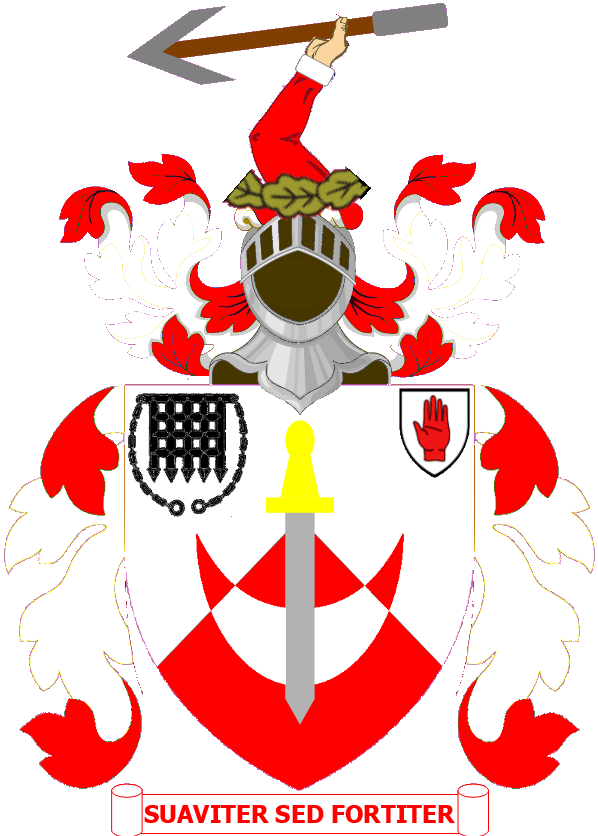
- Coat of arms of the Chapman baronets of Cleadon
- Creation date: 1958
- Status: dormant
- Motto: Suaviter Sed Fortiter
- Arms: Per chevron Argent and Gules a crescent counterchanged in dexter chief a portcullis chained Sable over all in pale a sword point downwards Proper pommel and hilt Or.
- Crest: Issuant from a wreath of oak Proper a dexter arm embowed vested Gules cuffed Argent grasping in the hand a harpoon also Proper.

The Chapman baronetcy, of Cleadon in the County of Durham was created in the Baronetage of the United Kingdom on 30 January 1958 for the soldier, accountant and politician Robert Chapman, Member of Parliament for Houghton-le-Spring from 1931 to 1935. His son 2nd Baronet was High Sheriff of Durham in 1960.

As of 2026 the title is held by the latter's son, the 3rd Baronet, who succeeded in 1987. He has been a deputy lieutenant of Tyne and Wear since 1997.

== Chapman baronets of Cleadon (1958) ==
- Sir Robert Chapman, 1st Baronet (1880–1963)
- Sir Robert MacGowan Chapman, 2nd Baronet (1911–1987)
- Sir David Robert Macgowan Chapman, 3rd Baronet (born 1941)

The heir apparent to the baronetcy is Michael Nicholas Chapman (born 1969).
