= 1914 Great Grimsby by-election =

1914 UK parliamentary by-election

← 1910	12 May 1914	Jan. 1918 →

Candidate	Tickler	Bannister
Party	Unionist	Liberal
Popular vote	8,471	8,193
Percentage	50.8%	49.2%
MP before election
George Doughty
Liberal Unionist
Subsequent MP
Thomas Tickler
Unionist

The 1914 Great Grimsby by-election was a Parliamentary by-election held on 12 May 1914. The constituency returned one Member of Parliament (MP) to the House of Commons of the United Kingdom, elected by the first past the post voting system. It was one of the last by-election contests to take place before the outbreak of the Great War, and provided a good indicator of how the main parties would have performed at an anticipated general election for 1914 or 1915.

== Vacancy ==
Sir George Doughty had been the MP for Great Grimsby since 1895, apart from the period from January–December 1910. Doughty was first elected as a Liberal before switching to the Liberal Unionists in 1898. He died suddenly, at the age of 60, of a heart seizure on 27 April 1914.

== Previous result ==
Doughty

General election December 1910: Grimsby
Party	Candidate	Votes	%	±%
Liberal Unionist	George Doughty	7,903	52.3	+3.4
Liberal	Thomas Wing	7,205	47.7	−3.4
Majority		698	4.6	N/A
Turnout		15,108	83.8	−0.6
Liberal Unionist gain from Liberal		Swing	+3.4	

== Candidates ==
- Early possibilities to be the Unionist candidate included former Brigg MP Sir Berkeley Sheffield and local party chairman RW Roberts. On 30 April jam manufacturer Thomas Tickler was chosen by the Unionists as their candidate to defend the seat. He was a local JP and Town Councillor, having served as Mayor in 1907.
- The Liberals had already selected James Whitely Wilkin as their prospective parliamentary candidate for a general election expected to occur later in 1914–15. However he was at the time travelling in the southern hemisphere and was not expected to be able to return in time. James William Eason, the local leader of the party was mentioned as a possible replacement. Their previous candidate, the former MP Tom Wing had been returned to parliament in March following the 1913 Houghton-le-Spring by-election. On 30 April they selected local Cleethorpes man Alfred Bannister. He also lived in the constituency, he served as a Justice of the Peace and was a Town Councillor who had served as Chairman of the council. He was involved in the local fishing industry as a steam trawler owner.
- The Grimsby Trades and Labour Council considered supporting Ernest Marklew as a British Socialist Party candidate. The BSP however did not feel they were able to mount a campaign in the time available and refused to sanction Marklew's candidature, forcing him to withdraw.

== Campaign ==
The Unionists moved the writ to get polling day fixed for 12 May, a Tuesday. This was expected to be of benefit to them as Tuesdays tended to be days when large numbers of fisherman, who would have been likely to vote for the Liberal candidate, were going to be away at sea. The Liberal candidate's direct links to the local fishing industry were expected to help him pick up a few votes who had previously voted for Doughty.

The Tariff Reform League, the Unionist Association of Ireland and the Unionist Defence League all opened campaign offices in Cleethorpes in support of the Unionist candidates campaign. The debate between Tariff Reform and Free trade did not play much of a part in the campaign but the issue of Irish Unionism versus Irish Nationalism did.

=== Irish Home Rule ===
The Liberal government was in the process of steering through parliament the Third Irish Home Rule Bill with the support of the Irish Nationalists. The bill was opposed by the Unionist opposition and most infamously by the Irish Unionist Leader Sir Edward Carson who in 1912 had urged those who disagreed with the government to use any means to oppose the measure. This was meant as a call for Ulstermen to take up arms. Furthermore, Unionist politicians had been encouraging British Army officers to disobey orders to quell any Ulster uprising. At a Liberal campaign meeting on 2 May, three MPs spoke in support of Bannister. Tom Wing the former Grimsby Liberal MP, Francis Neilson and Irish Nationalist Richard McGhee. McGhee attacked the Unionist leader Sir Edward Carson for his treasonous position. Bannister added that "If he were King, he would chop off Sir Edward Carson's head." Unionist leaders Carson and Bonar Law responded to criticisms that they had deliberately stirred up unrest in Ulster by sending letters of support to the Unionist candidate in which they blamed the resulting unrest on the Liberal government for introducing its Home Rule policies. Both H. H. Asquith and Lloyd George sent letters of support to the Liberal candidate. Lloyd George reminding him of Unionist Party attempts to create civil war in Ireland and mutiny in the British Army. On 9 May, leading Irish Nationalist MP T.P. O'Connor visited Grimsby in support of the Liberal campaign. He highlighted the activities of Unionist politicians who sought to encourage British army officers to mutiny. Carson, who had been widely criticised for his utterances on Ulster went to the extent of posting a letter to Grimsby electors, defending his militant position on Ireland. The Unionist campaign decision to focus on Irish Home Rule might have seemed difficult to understand. However, in past Grimsby elections, the issue had seemed to be the one that had served them best.

=== National Insurance Act ===
As with previous by-elections, the Unionist campaign sought to attack the Liberal government's National Insurance Act. However, this idea backfired on them early on; with the issue subsequently dropped from their campaign. At a Unionist campaign meeting on 4 May Lord Robert Cecil attacked the National Insurance Act, arguing that employers should not be made to contribute. The following day, a deputation of local insurance agents met with Tickler to point out that without employer compulsion, the scheme would not work. Tickler's response was one of support for Cecil. The deputation of insurance agents then met with Bannister who assured them of his support for the act and his opposition to any voluntary system. This resulted in Tickler changing his position to one of support for the act.

== Result ==
There was a small swing of 1.5% to the Liberal Party, but was not quite enough to regain the seat from the Unionists.

By-Election 12 May 1914: Grimsby
Party	Candidate	Votes	%	±%
Unionist	Thomas Tickler	8,471	50.8	−1.5
Liberal	Alfred Bannister	8,193	49.2	+1.5
Majority		278	1.6	−3.0
Turnout		16,664	80.5	−3.3
Unionist hold		Swing	-1.5	

The result would have given a great deal of confidence to Liberal Prime Minister H. H. Asquith about his party's prospects of winning the next general election. It would also have re-assured him about implementing Irish Home Rule.

== Aftermath ==
The 3rd Irish Home Rule Bill was passed in parliament later that month. However, Asquith delayed its implementation due to the outbreak of war a few months later. A general election was due to take place by the end of 1915. By the autumn of 1914, the following candidates had been adopted to contest that election.

- Unionist: Thomas Tickler
- Liberal: James Whitely Wilkin

Due to the outbreak of war, the election never took place.

General election 14 December 1918: Grimsby
Party	Candidate	Votes	%	±%
Unionist	*Thomas Tickler	13,688	53.7	+2.9
Labour	Charles E Franklin	9,015	35.4	New
Ind. Unionist	James William Eason	2,791	10.9	New
Majority		4,673	18.3	+16.7
Turnout		25,494	54.0	−26.5
Unionist hold		Swing		

- Tickler was the endorsed candidate of the Coalition Government.
