= Beatrice Bolam =

Beatrice Bolam MBE (née Patterson; August 1919 – 2 January 2013) was an English politician and councillor for Jarrow, County Durham.

== Early life ==
Bolam was born and raised in Jarrow, the eldest of four children of a boilermaker who worked for Palmers Shipbuilding and Iron Company. She grew up during the Great Depression and her family struggled after her father lost his job in Palmer's collapse. Educated at Jarrow Grammar School, she then attended Skerry's College in Newcastle until 1937, training for a career in the civil service.

In 1942, she married Oswald James Bolam, a bookkeeper in the shipyards, and took the name Bolam.

== Career and politics ==
Bolam became a member of the Conservative Party in 1939. The next year, she was made vice chairman of the Jarrow Imperial League. She worked as a civil servant until 1942, when she returned to Jarrow Grammar School to become secretary to the headmaster. In 1945, at age 26, she became the youngest member in history of the Jarrow Town Council. In 1953, she was elected to serve as the representative for Jarrow on Durham County Council, defeating a Labour Party member to take the role.

That same year, she founded the Jarrow branch of the Young Conservatives and assisted Stanley Holmes (later Baron Dovercourt) in the general election. In 1947, she volunteered at the Jarrow by-election when William Scott stood as the Conservative candidate.

In 1947, she left the grammar school to devote her life full-time to politics, which was taking up more of her time. In the 1950 and 1951 general elections she was a housewife when she contested Houghton-le-Spring, but was defeated both times by Billy Blyton of the Labour party.

She earned a reputation as a strong speaker, and served on many committees and speakers' panels. She held various positions within the Jarrow Conservative Association, including chair twice and treasurer.

== Honours ==
In the 1973 New Year Honours, Bolam was appointed MBE for political and public services in the North of England. She also received an award for being one of the longest-serving members of the Conservative Party in the UK.

== Death ==
Bolam died at age 93 in South Shields, Tyne and Wear and was survived by her brother Alan Patterson.
