= Home Secretary (disambiguation) =

Home Secretary is a ministerial office in the United Kingdom.

Home Secretary may also refer to:

- Home Secretary (India), a position in the Indian Ministry of Home Affairs
- The Home Secretary, an 1895 play by R. C. Carlton
- Home Secretary, a 2017 album by Rebecka Törnqvist
