= Henry Fenwick =

Henry Fenwick may refer to:

- Henry Fenwick (MP for Sunderland) (1820–1868), British Liberal Party politician
- Henry Fenwick (MP for Houghton-le-Spring) (1863–1939), British army officer and Liberal Party politician
