= Cuyler Hastings =

American stage actor

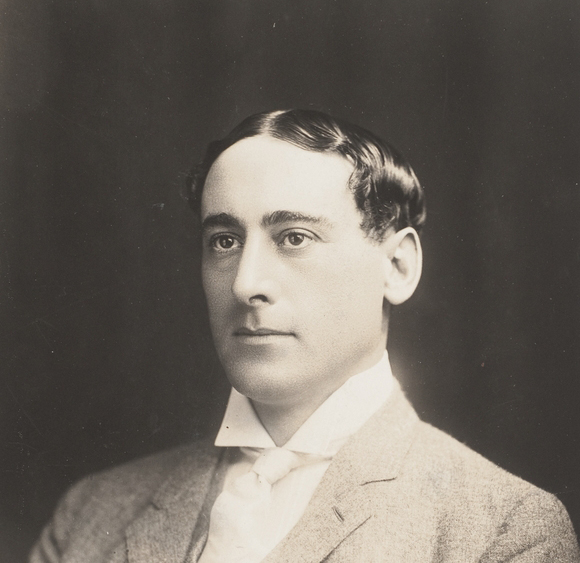
- Cuyler Hastings, Australia, c. 1905
- Born: circa 1864
- Died: 10 January 1914; Forth Avenue
- Occupation: Stage Actor

Cuyler Hastings (c. 1864 – 10 January 1914) was an American stage actor, remembered for his portrayal of the fictional detective Sherlock Holmes.

== History ==
=== Australia ===
In 1902 Hastings was contracted by J. C. Williamson's to play the Holmes character on stage in Melbourne and Sydney — he would sail from San Francisco on 14 August 1902. Williamson already had Harry Plimmer, an Australian actor, playing the part to such business that his season in Perth was being extended, and Hastings could open in Melbourne in mid-September, with Sydney following a month later. He arrived in Sydney by the Sierra on 5 September, and opened in Melbourne with Sherlock Holmes — The Strange Case of Miss Faulkner by William Gillette, based on the work of Conan Doyle, who was credited as co-author. Director was H. H. Vincent, and the cast included F. Lumsden Hare as Watson, May Chevalier as Faulkner, J. B. Atholwood as Moriarty, Redge Carey as Billy.

Cuyler Hastings is a magnetic actor. He equally compels attention and admiration. Impossible to take the eyes away from him for a moment. . . In appearance Mr. Hastings is tall, slight, handsome, from an intellectual standard, and so dark-complexioned as to make his grave, thoughtful face extremely melancholy. When he sits, as he has a habit of doing, with half-closed eyes and lips severely set, his face is one of extreme gloom. Even his smile has little mirth. In this probably is his facial resemblance to the Sherlock Holmes of Conan Doyle.

He also played

- The butler Crichton in J. M. Barrie's The Admirable Crichton
- Dick Heldar in George S. Fleming's The Light That Failed

He was reportedly less than memorable as Francois Villon in Justin Huntly McCarthy's If I Were King

While in Australia he became a friend of journalist Eugenia Stone who, later in London as Eugenia, Lady Doughty, introduced him to several notable people, including Sir Herbert Tree.

=== Return to America ===
He played the reform candidate "Matthew Standish" in the New York production of William C. De Mille's play The Woman.

== Death ==
He killed himself by pistol shot in his room on Fourth Avenue, NYC. He had recently suffered an attack of partial paralysis, coupled with some financial setback which, it was speculated, may have contributed to his urge to suicide.

By his will, executed at The Players club on 3 December 1913, he left the bulk of his estimated $25,000 estate to a half-brother George W. Hastings (a lawyer in Toronto) and a half-sister Anna Garrett Munro. Also mentioned was $1,000 to Marion Irene Vivers of New South Wales, for whom he was also holding some stocks and shares. An article written in 1914 asserts that this beneficiary was a love interest.
