= 1913 Houghton-le-Spring by-election =

UK parliamentary by-election

The 1913 Houghton-le-Spring by-election was a Parliamentary by-election held on 18 March 1913. The constituency returned one Member of Parliament (MP) to the House of Commons of the United Kingdom, elected by the first past the post voting system.

== Vacancy ==
Robert Cameron had been Liberal MP for Houghton-le-Spring since 1895. He died on 13 February 1913.

== Previous contested result ==
Cameron was elected unopposed in December 1910, however, he was opposed at the election before.

General election January 1910 Electorate 17,504
Party	Candidate	Votes	%	±%
Liberal	Robert Cameron	10,393	70.3	−1.9
Conservative	Hugh Sidney Streatfield	4,382	29.7	+1.9
Majority		6,011	40.6	−3.8
Turnout		14,775	84.4	+1.2
Liberal hold		Swing	-1.9	

== Candidates ==
The Liberals chose a Grimsby man, Tom Wing to defend the seat. He was elected at the January 1910 general election as Member of Parliament (MP) for Grimsby, but lost that seat at the general election in December 1910.

The Unionists selected local barrister, Thomas Richardson as their candidate. His father had been Liberal MP for Hartlepool.

Labour intervened with an Independent Labour Party member, William House, who was sponsored by the Durham Miners' Association, for whom he had been President since 1900. House stood for the Labour Party in Bishop Auckland at the January and December 1910 general elections.

== Campaign ==
In the recent past, there had been a good working relationship between the local miners and the local Liberal Association to the point that by 1913, miners still dominated the local Liberal association. Every miners lodge in the constituency was represented at Wing's selection meeting. During the campaign, many miners lodge officials spoke on platforms in support of Wing. This came as something of a slap in the face to both the Independent Labour Party and the Durham Miners Association who had hoped that the local miners would support their candidate, House. This split in the local miners lodges was good news for the Unionist campaign. They knew that their only hoping of winning was if the Labour candidate took half or the Liberal vote, allowing the Unionists the chance to come through the middle.

== Result ==
The Liberal Party held the seat with a significantly reduced majority.

Tom Wing

Houghton-le-Spring by-election, 1913
Party	Candidate	Votes	%	±%
Liberal	Thomas Wing	6,930	43.6	−26.7
Unionist	Thomas Richardson	4,807	30.2	+0.5
Labour	William House	4,165	26.2	+26.2
Majority		2,123	13.4	−27.2
Turnout		15,902	83.6	−0.8
Liberal hold		Swing	-13.6	

== Aftermath ==
A General Election was due to take place by the end of 1915. By the autumn of 1914, the following candidates had been adopted to contest that election. Due to the outbreak of war, the election never took place. House's parliamentary interests moved on to the Mid Durham constituency, while Richardson never stood again.

General Election 1914/15: Houghton-le-Spring Electorate 19,722
Party	Candidate	Votes	%	±%
Liberal	Thomas Wing			
Labour	W. P. Richardson			
Unionist				

At the eleventh hour, the Labour Party replaced W. P. Richardson as candidate with another local miner Robert Richardson

General election 14 December 1918: Houghton-le-Spring Electorate 32,552
Party	Candidate	Votes	%	±%
Labour	Robert Richardson	7,315	36.3	N/A
Liberal	Thomas Wing	6,626	32.9	N/A
National Democratic	John Lindsley	6,185	30.8	New
Majority		689	3.4	N/A
Turnout		20,126	61.8	N/A
Labour gain from Liberal		Swing	N/A	

- Lindsley was the endorsed candidate of the Coalition Government.
