= Lady Windermere's Fan =

Play by Oscar Wilde

1892 premiere: left to right, Ben Webster (Cecil Graham), Nutcombe Gould (Lord Darlington), Adolphus Vane-Tempest (Charles Dumby), H. H. Vincent (Lord Augustus Lorton) and George Alexander (Lord Windermere)

Lady Windermere's Fan, A Play About a Good Woman is a four-act comedy by Oscar Wilde, first performed on Saturday, 20 February 1892, at the St James's Theatre in London.

The story concerns Lady Windermere, who suspects that her husband is having an affair with another woman; she confronts him with it. Although he denies it, he invites the other woman, Mrs Erlynne, to his wife's birthday ball. Angered by her husband's supposed unfaithfulness, Lady Windermere decides to leave her husband for Lord Darlington, who has recently confessed his love for her. After discovering what has transpired, Mrs Erlynne follows Lady Windermere and attempts to persuade her to return to her husband and in the course of this, Mrs Erlynne lets herself be discovered in a compromising position at Lord Darlington's so Lady Windermere has the opportunity to leave without being noticed by Lord Windermere. It is then revealed that Mrs Erlynne is Lady Windermere's mother, who abandoned her family twenty years earlier. Mrs Erlynne sacrifices her reputation to save her daughter's marriage.

== Composition ==
By the summer of 1891 Wilde had already written two plays; Vera; or, The Nihilists and The Duchess of Padua had found little success. Unperturbed, he decided to write another play but turned from tragedy to comedy. He went to the Lake District in the north of England, where he stayed with a friend and later met Robert Ross. Numerous characters in the play appear to draw their names from the north of England: Lady Windermere from the lake and nearby town Windermere (though Wilde had used "Windermere" earlier in Lord Arthur Savile's Crime), Lady Agatha Carlisle from Carlisle, the Duchess of Berwick from Berwick-upon-Tweed, Lord Darlington from Darlington. Wilde began writing the play at the prodding of George Alexander, the actor manager of St James's Theatre. The play was finished by October, at which point he began writing Salome. Alexander liked the play, and offered him an advance of £1,000 for it. Wilde, impressed by his confidence, opted to take a percentage instead, from which he would earn £7,000 in the first year alone (worth £769,000 today).

Alexander was a meticulous manager and he and Wilde began exhaustive revisions and rehearsals of the play. Both were talented artists with strong ideas about their art. Wilde, for instance, emphasised attention to aesthetic minutiae rather than realism; he resisted Alexander's suggested broad stage movements, quipping that "Details are of no importance in life, but in art details are vital". These revisions continued after the opening night when, at the suggestion of both friends and Alexander, Wilde made changes to reveal Mrs Erlynne's relationship with Lady Windermere gradually throughout the play, rather than reserving the secret for the final act. Despite these artistic differences, both were professional and their collaboration was a fruitful one.

There is an extant manuscript of the play held in the William Andrews Clark Memorial Library at the University of California, Los Angeles.

== Characters and original cast ==
Clockwise from top left: Wilde, Marion Terry, Nutcombe Gould, H. H. Vincent, Lily Hanbury and Ben Webster

- Lord Windermere – George Alexander
- Lord Darlington – Nutcombe Gould
- Lord Augustus Lorton – H. H. Vincent
- Mr Cecil Graham – Ben Webster
- Mr Dumby – Adolphus Vane-Tempest
- Mr Hopper – Alfred Holles
- Parker (butler) – Vernon Sansbury
- Lady Windermere – Lily Hanbury
- The Duchess of Berwick – Fanny Coleman
- Lady Agatha Carlisle – Laura Graves
- Lady Plymdale – Charlotte Granville
- Lady Stutfield – Madge Girdlestone
- Mrs Cowper-Cowper – Alice de Winton
- Mrs Erlynne – Marion Terry
- Rosalie (maid) – Winifred Dolan

Source: Published playscript (1893).

== Plot ==
=== Act I ===
The play opens in the morning room of the Windermeres' residence in London. It is tea time and Lady Windermere—who is preparing for her coming of age birthday ball that evening—has a visit from a friend, Lord Darlington. She shows off her new fan: a present from her husband. She explains to Lord Darlington that she is upset over the compliments he continues to pay to her, revealing that she has very particular views about what is acceptable in society, due in part to her somewhat Puritan upbringing.

The Duchess of Berwick calls and Lord Darlington leaves shortly thereafter. The Duchess informs Lady Windermere that her husband may be betraying her marriage by making repeated visits to another woman, a Mrs Erlynne, and possibly giving her large sums of money. These rumours have been gossip among London society for quite a while, though seemingly this is the first Lady Windermere has heard about it.

Following the departure of the Duchess, Lady Windermere decides to check her husband's bank book. She finds the book in a desk and sees that nothing appears amiss, though on returning she discovers a second bank book with a lock. After prying the lock open, she finds it lists large sums of money given to Mrs Erlynne.

At this point, Lord Windermere enters and she confronts him. Though he cannot deny that he has had dealings with Mrs Erlynne, he states that he is not betraying Lady Windermere. He requests that she send Mrs Erlynne an invitation to her birthday ball that evening to help her back into society. When Lady Windermere refuses, he writes out an invitation himself. Lady Windermere makes clear her intention to cause a scene if Mrs Erlynne appears, to which Lord Windermere responds that it would be in her best interest not to do so.

Lady Windermere leaves in disgust to prepare for the party, and Lord Windermere reveals in soliloquy that he is protecting Mrs Erlynne's true identity to save his wife extreme humiliation.

What shall I do? I dare not tell her who this woman really is. The shame would kill her.

— Lord Windermere

=== Act II ===
Act II opens in the Windermeres' drawing room during the birthday ball that evening. Various guests enter, and make small talk. Lord Windermere enters and asks Lady Windermere to speak with him, but she brushes him off.

A friend of Lord Windermere's, Lord Augustus Lorton ("Tuppy"), pulls him aside to inquire about Mrs Erlynne, with whom Tuppy is enamoured. Lord Windermere reveals that there is nothing untoward in his relationship with Mrs Erlynne, and that she will be attending the ball, which comes as a great relief to Lord Augustus as he was worried about her social standing.

After an unsuccessful attempt to make peace with his wife, Lord Windermere summons the courage to tell the truth to her, but at that moment Mrs Erlynne arrives at the party, where she is greeted coldly by Lady Windermere, spoiling his plan.

Alone, Lady Windermere and Lord Darlington discuss Mrs Erlynne's attendance. Lady Windermere is enraged and confused and asks Lord Darlington to be her friend. Instead of friendship, Lord Darlington takes advantage of Lady Windermere's tragic state and professes his love to her, offering her his life, and inviting her to risk short-term social humiliation for a new life with him. Lord Darlington sets her an ultimatum to try to convince her to take action immediately, while still in a state of shock. Lady Windermere is shocked by the revelation, and finds she does not have the courage to take the offer. Heartbroken, Lord Darlington announces that he will be leaving the country the next day and that they will never meet again, and leaves.

The guests begin to leave, and say their goodnights to Lady Windermere—some remarking positively about Mrs Erlynne. On the other side of the room Mrs Erlynne is discussing her plans with Lord Windermere; she intends to marry Lord Augustus and will require some money from Lord Windermere.

Later, Lady Windermere, in spite of her earlier reluctance, decides to depart the house at once for Lord Darlington, and leaves a note to that effect for Lord Windermere. Mrs Erlynne discovers the note and that Lady Windermere has gone, and is curiously worried by this revelation. While reading the note, a brief monologue reveals that she is in fact Lady Windermere's mother and made a similar mistake herself twenty years previously. She takes the letter and exits to locate Lady Windermere.

How can I save her? How can I save my child? A moment may ruin a life. Who knows that better than I?

— Mrs Erlynne

=== Act III ===
Lady Windermere is alone in Lord Darlington's rooms, unsure if she has made the right decision. Eventually she resolves to return to her husband, but then Mrs Erlynne appears. Despite Mrs Erlynne's honest attempts to persuade her to return home to her husband, Lady Windermere is convinced her appearance is part of some plot conceived by her and Lord Windermere. Mrs Erlynne finally breaks Lady Windermere's resistance by imploring her to return for the sake of her young child, but as they begin to exit they hear Lord Darlington entering with friends. The two women hide.

The men—who include Lord Windermere and Lord Augustus—have been evicted from their gentlemen's club at closing time and talk about women: mainly Mrs Erlynne. One of them takes notice of a fan lying on a table (Lady Windermere's) and presumes that Lord Darlington presently has a woman visiting. As Lord Windermere rises to leave, the fan is pointed out to him, which he instantly recognises as his wife's. He demands to know if Lord Darlington has her hidden somewhere. Lord Darlington refuses to cooperate, believing that Lady Windermere has come to him. Just as Lord Windermere is about to discover Lady Windermere's hiding place, Mrs Erlynne reveals herself instead, shocking all the men and allowing Lady Windermere to slip away unnoticed.

I am afraid I took your wife's fan in mistake for my own, when I was leaving your house to-night. I am so sorry.

— Mrs Erlynne

=== Act IV ===
The next day, Lady Windermere is lying on the couch of the morning room anxious about whether to tell her husband what actually happened, or whether Mrs Erlynne will have already betrayed her secret. Her husband enters. He is sympathetic towards her and suggests that, as the London season is almost over, they should head to their country estate to forget the recent incident. Lady Windermere apologises for her previous suspicion of her husband and behaviour at the party, and Lord Windermere makes clear his new contempt for Mrs Erlynne—warning his wife to stay away from her.

Mrs Erlynne's arrival is announced along with the return of the fan, and despite her husband's protestations, Lady Windermere insists on seeing her. Mrs Erlynne enters and states that she shall be going abroad, but asks that Lady Windermere give her a photograph of herself and her son.

Whilst Lady Windermere leaves the room to find one, the story is revealed: Mrs Erlynne left her husband for a lover shortly after Lady Windermere's birth. When her new lover abandoned her, Mrs Erlynne was left alone and in disrepute. More recently, using the assumed name of Mrs Erlynne, she has begun blackmailing Lord Windermere to regain her lifestyle and status, by threatening to reveal her true identity as Lady Windermere's shameful mother—not dead, as Lady Windermere believes. Lord Windermere laments not having told his wife the whole story at once and resolves to tell her the truth now. Mrs Erlynne forbids him to do so, threatening to spread shame far and wide if he does.

Lady Windermere returns with the photograph which she presents to Mrs Erlynne, and requests that Lord Windermere check for the return of Mrs Erlynne's coach. Now that they are alone, and being owed a favour, Mrs Erlynne demands that Lady Windermere not reveal the truth about the events of the previous night to Lord Windermere, and Lady Windermere promises to keep the secret.

After Lord Windermere's return, Lord Augustus enters. He is shocked to see Mrs Erlynne after the events of the night before, but she requests his company as she heads to her carriage, and he soon returns to the Windermeres with news that she has satisfactorily explained the events of the evening, and that they are to marry and live out of England.

Lady Windermere, taking her husband's hand, to Lord Augustus: "Ah, you're marrying a very good woman!"

Their marriage is restored, but both Lord and Lady Windermere keep their secrets.

== Productions ==
=== Premiere ===
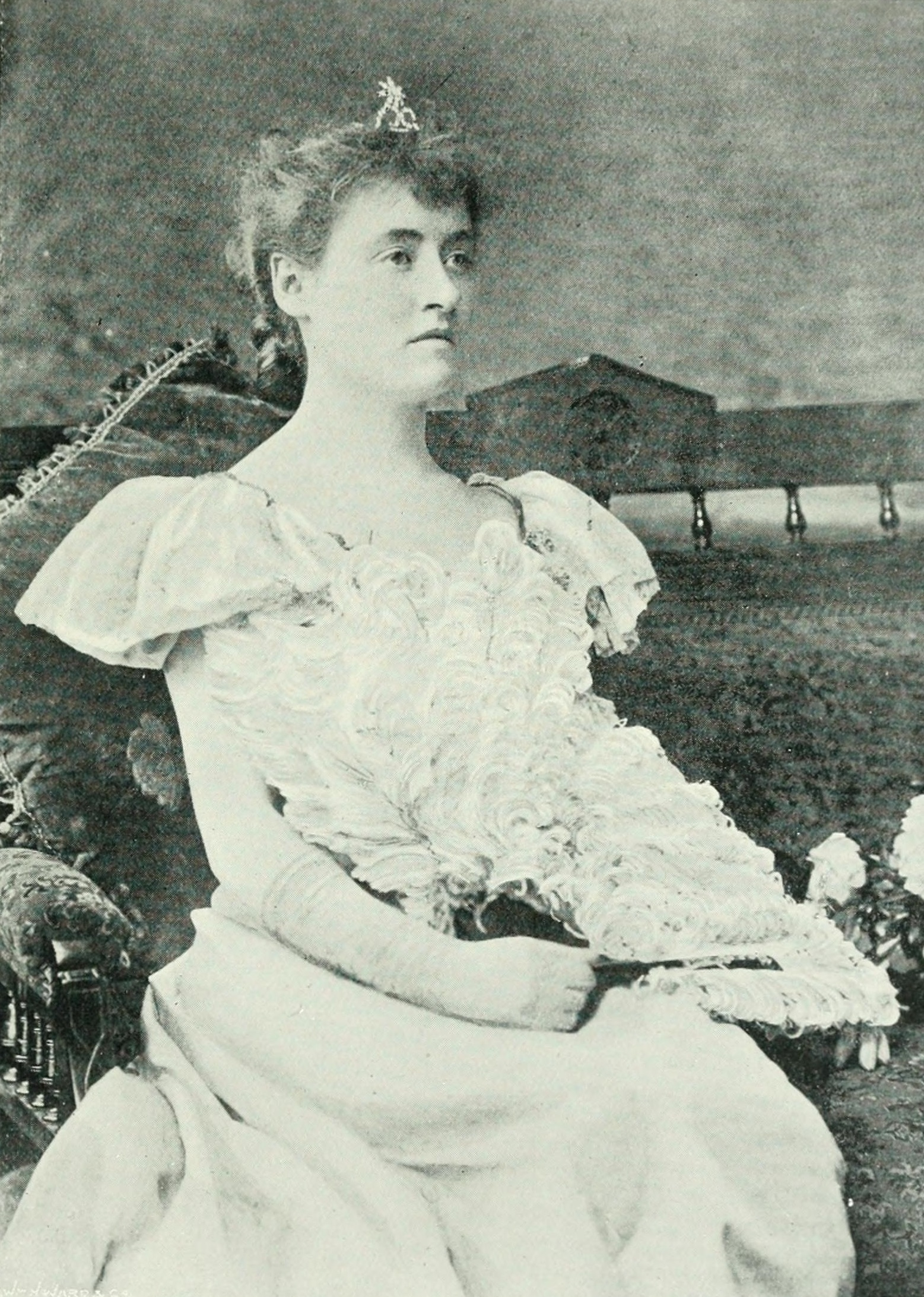
Winifred Emery as Lady Windermere, 1892

The premiere at the St James's Theatre was followed by a famous speech by Wilde. When Wilde answered the calls of "Author!" and appeared before the curtains after the third act, critics were more offended by the cigarette in his hand than his ironically egotistic speech:

Ladies and Gentlemen. I have enjoyed this evening immensely. The actors have given us a charming rendering of a delightful play, and your appreciation has been most intelligent. I congratulate you on the great success of your performance, which persuades me that you think almost as highly of the play as I do myself.

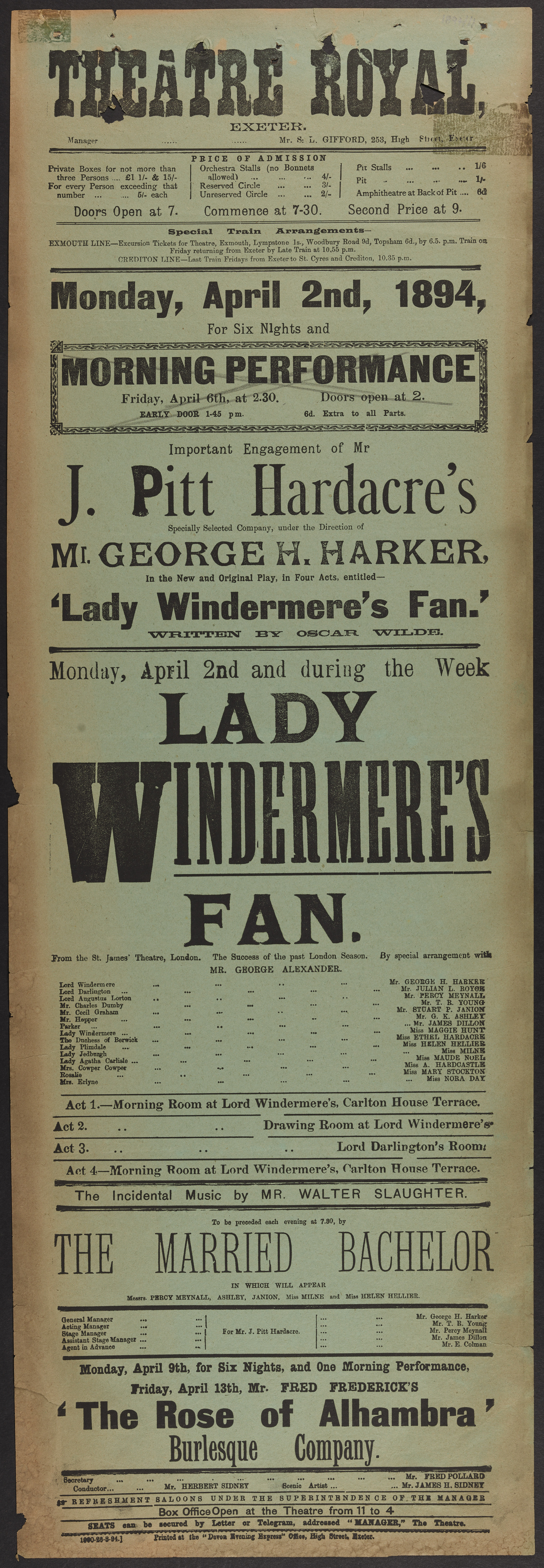
Playbill from the Theatre Royal, Exeter, advertising a performance of Lady Windermere's Fan on 2 April 1894.

Mrs Erlynne was originated by Marion Terry, and Lady Windermere by Lily Hanbury, who was succeeded after a few performances by Winifred Emery. The play's Broadway première on 5 February 1893 at Palmer's Theatre was also the first Broadway performance for stage and screen actress Julia Arthur, who played Lady Windermere in that production.

== Themes ==
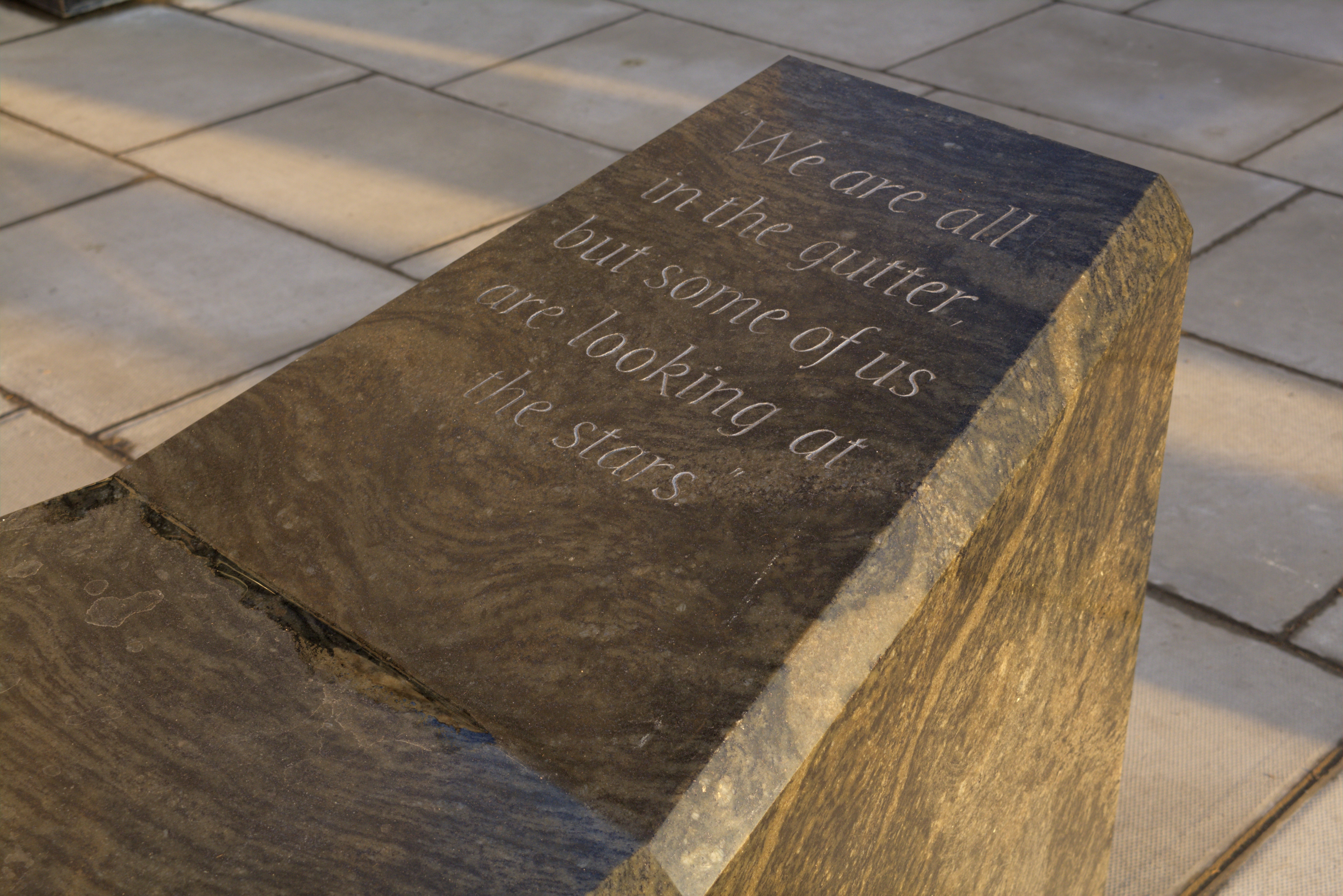
Inscription from Lady Windermere's Fan, "We are all in the gutter, but some of us are looking at the stars", at Wilde's public monument in London

By showing in St. James's, Wilde was targeting a fashionable, upper-middle class audience and the play maps out the geography of their world - Grosvenor Square, Curzon Street, the park - with precision. Peter Raby has also highlighted Lady Windermere's Fan as a good example of Wilde's most successful dramatic technique: the juxtaposition of the comic and the serious. "Once the absurd and the patently false have been established, the serious emotions and ideas which are explored have been given a setting which prevents them from ever becoming too serious".

Scholar Paul Fortunato describes Oscar Wilde as a modernist, who used his modern aesthetics so as to direct him into the realm of mass culture. Wilde's huge popularity as a playwright began with his production of Lady Windermere's Fan, his recherché attitude and personal aesthetics reflected in his writing. Fortunato elaborates on the facets of his aestheticism—an aestheticism that distorts and lies on the surface, rejects any notion of an authentic self, and centres on the female aesthete and woman of fashion. As he describes, understanding Wilde as a modernist through his writing of Lady Windermere's Fan can help us understand the disparity between mass culture and high society. Wilde bridges this by theorising his modern aesthetics beneath the ornamental surface of fashion and elite society. The fan that strings together the play's scenes simultaneously evokes a traditional symbol of modesty while revealing a truly modern current of infidelity.

== Media ==
Audio production by the Recorded Drama Society of the University of Cambridge
Act One
Lady Windermere receives guests in the morning room.

Act Two
Lady Windermere's coming of age ball.

Act Three
Events unfold in Lord Darlington's rooms.

Act Four
The conclusion.

== Adaptations ==
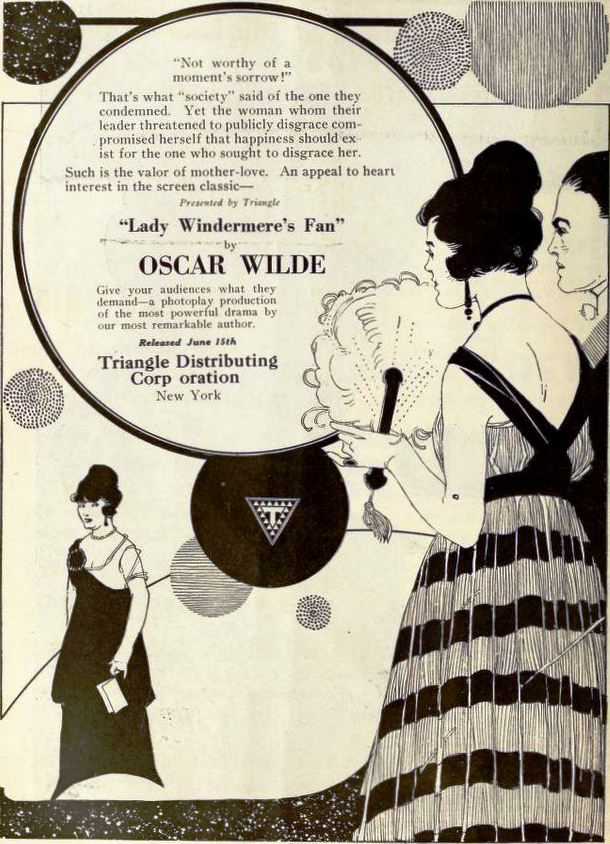
Advertisement for the British film Lady Windermere's Fan (1916), for its 1919 release in the United States (The Moving Picture World, June 7, 1919)

The play has been the subject of numerous film and television adaptations and a musical adaptation.

Films include:

- A 1916 British film Lady Windermere's Fan.
- In 1924, Hong Shen's production of 少奶奶的扇子 (Shàonǎinai de shànzi) ("The Young Lady's Fan").
- In 1925 silent film, Lady Windermere's Fan, which stars Ronald Colman, May McAvoy, Bert Lytell, Irene Rich and Edward Martindel. It was adapted by Julien Josephson and directed by Ernst Lubitsch. In 2002, this film was selected for preservation in the United States National Film Registry by the Library of Congress as being "culturally, historically, or aesthetically significant".
- A 1935 German film Lady Windermere's Fan directed by Heinz Hilpert and starring Lil Dagover and Walter Rilla.
- A 1948 Argentine film Story of a Bad Woman directed by Luis Saslavsky and starring Dolores del Río.
- In 1949, Otto Preminger directed an adaptation titled The Fan starring Jeanne Crain, Madeleine Carroll, and George Sanders.
- A musical theatre version of the play was created by Noël Coward in 1954 under the title After the Ball.
- In 1975, an Egyptian adaptation film (2 Women – امرأتان) starring Nelly, Ahmed Mazhar and Noor El Sherif was released. The film was directed by Hassan Ramzy.
- The BBC produced a television version as part of their Theatre Night series which was first transmitted in the UK during September 1985. This production features Helena Little, Tim Woodward, Stephanie Turner and Kenneth Cranham. It is available on DVD as part of The Oscar Wilde Collection.
- A 2004 film adaptation, titled A Good Woman, switched the setting to the Amalfi coast of Italy, made the Windermeres Mr. & Mrs, and updated the time frame to 1930. The film stars Helen Hunt, Mark Umbers, Scarlett Johansson, Stephen Campbell Moore, and Tom Wilkinson.
- In 2009 Irish television production company Accomplice TV received funding from the Broadcasting Commission of Ireland and TV3 (Ireland) for their contemporary adaptation of the play set in South County Dublin. Laura Windermere's Bag was broadcast by TV3 in 2009.
- In 2018, Kathy Burke's production of the play with the Classic Spring Theatre Company at London's Vaudeville Theatre was recorded and shown "live" in cinemas under the "More2Screen" initiative.
- In 2020, the virtual international theatre company Cloud Theatrics performed an online production. The production was directed by Marie Newton and Holden Stokes. The performance had a YouTube release followed by a public release on their platform.

Radio adaptations include:

- On 19 June 1989, Joely Richardson starred as Lady Windermere in a BBC Radio 4 Monday Play production directed by David Johnson, with Penelope Keith as Mrs Erlynne, Gary Bond as Lord Windermere, Janet Burnell as the Duchess of Berwick, Patsy Rowlands as Lady Carlisle, Richard Tate as Lord Augustus Lorton and Edward Fox as Lord Darlington.
- In May 1999, L.A. Theatre Works The Play's The Thing series broadcast a reading of the play featuring Joanna Going as Lady Windermere, Judy Geeson as Lady Plymdale, Roger Rees as Lord Windermere, Eric Stoltz as Lord Darlington, Lisa Harrow as Mrs Erlynne and Miriam Margolyes as the Duchess of Berwick.
- On 15 April 2018, BBC Radio 3's Drama on 3 broadcast a production directed by Martin Jarvis with Mira Sorvino as Mrs Erlynne, Susannah Fielding as Lady Windermere, James Callix as Lord Windermere, Jonathan Cake as Lord Darlington, Rosalind Ayres as the Duchess of Berwick, Ian Ogilvy as Lord Augustus Lorton and Peter Woodward as Mr. Dumby.

== Editions ==
- Wilde, Oscar (1893). Lady Windermere's Fan (1st ed.). London: The Bodley Head.
- Wilde. Oscar. Lady Windermere’s Fan, Little Blue Book N8, 1921.
- Wilde, Oscar. Lady Windermere's Fan. published in The Importance of Being Earnest and Other Plays. London: Penguin, 1940. ISBN 0-14-048209-1.
- Wilde, Oscar. Lady Windermere's Fan. London: Nick Hern Books, 2005. ISBN 978-1-85459-771-7

== See also ==
- Lady Windermere syndrome
