= Liberty Hall (play) =

H. H. Vincent as Briginshaw in the original production

Liberty Hall is a comedy-drama play by the British writer R. C. Carton which premiered in London on 3 December 1892, at the St James's Theatre. It ran for 192 performances, until 20 May 1893. The cast was:

- Mr Owen – George Alexander
- William Todman – Edward Righton
- Hon Gerald Harringay – Ben Webster
- Mr Pedrick – Nutcombe Gould
- J. Briginshaw – H. H. Vincent
- Robert Binks – Richard Saker
- Luscombe – Vernon Sansbury
- Mr Hickson – Alfred Holles
- Miss Hickson – Ailsa Craig
- Crafer – Fanny Coleman
- Amy Chilworth – Maude Millett
- Blanche Chilworth – Marion Terry

Source: The Era.

The play was revived at the St James's for a single matinée performance in March 1894 and 16 performances in November 1895.

== Film adaptation ==
In 1914 the play was turned into a film of the same title directed by Harold M. Shaw.

== Bibliography ==
- Goble, Alan. The Complete Index to Literary Sources in Film. Walter de Gruyter, 1999.
- Wearing, J. P. (1976). The London Stage, 1890–1899: A Calendar of Plays and Players. Metuchen: Scarecrow Press. ISBN 978-0-81-080910-9.
