= William Stewart (Houghton-le-Spring MP) =

English member of Parliament

William Joseph Stewart MP (5 April 1878 – 5 March 1960) was a Labour Party politician in the United Kingdom.

He was elected at the 1935 general election as Member of Parliament (MP) for Houghton-le-Spring in County Durham, defeating the sitting Conservative MP Robert Chapman, who had won the seat in 1931. Stewart served only one term in Parliament, standing down at the 1945 general election.

Parliament of the United Kingdom
Preceded by Robert Chapman	Member of Parliament for Houghton-le-Spring; 1935–1945	Succeeded by Billy Blyton
