= J. B. Atholwood =

Australian actor

James Brown Atholwood (c. 1864 – 11 March 1931) was an Australian actor, a member of J. C. Williamson's company. His voice was too distinctive to take leading roles, but he was admirable in character parts. He was convicted of bigamy after a public trial.

== History ==
Atholwood was a son of James Wood and Catherine Fulton Brown.

He learned his stagecraft from William Hoskins, and played in:

- The Sign of the Cross in support of Julius Knight
- The Prisoner of Zenda
- The Royal Divorce, and played Napoleon when Knight fell sick
- The Silver King as Jaikes to Frank Harvey's Wilfred Denver at the Theatre Royal, in June, 1926
- Sherlock Holmes as Professor Moriarty, to Cuyler Hastings' Holmes
- If I Were King as Louis XI
- Leah Kleschna as Schram, to Tittell Brune and Roy Redgrave
- John Glayde's Honour as Michael Shurmur to Thomas Kingston and Mrs. Brough
- J. C. Williamson's pantomime Aladdin as Abanazar
- Double and Quit as the actor Edwin Drake, at the Palace Theatre, Sydney
- The Show Boat as Windy, the pilot

== Last years ==
Atholwood lived his last years in retirement at his home "Akhnaton" on Diamond Bay Road, Vaucluse. His hobbies included butterfly collecting and creating plaster cameo portraits.

He died as the result of a stroke, following an operation. His remains were interred at the South Head Cemetery.

== Family ==
Atholwood married Ethel Ruby Yelverton in 1897, believing her previous marriage to Barry Marshall had been annulled. She left him and later had him charged with committing bigamy with Lillias May Townshend in May 1902. He was found guilty but there were mitigating circumstances and he was released before serving half his sentence. In 1908 Yelverton sued him for maintenance in circumstances which gave the appearance of vindictiveness. They appear to have resolved their differences as in 1922 Atholwood and Yelverton (daughter of Mary Elizabeth and Alfred S Parnwell, of Hobart) celebrated the 25th anniversary of their wedding.

His children were:

- Sybil Edna Marguerite Atholwood (6 August 1900 – ) was a soprano and an actress.
- Joyce Atholwood (1913-1989)
- Ronald Atholwood (1910–1967), also an actor, married Dorothy Marguerite Coffey.
- Sidney Atholwood ( – )
- Keith Atholwood ( – )
