= Nicholas Wood (MP) =

Nicholas Wood MP (1832 – 24 December 1892) was a British industrialist and Conservative Party politician.

He was born in Killingworth, Northumberland, where his father, also Nicholas Wood, was a locomotive engineer. The family subsequently moved to Hetton-le-Hole, County Durham, where they took part in developing the coalfields. Educated at Repton School, he went on to be the proprietor of a number of mines in the Hetton area, as well as having interests in shipping and other industries. In 1881 he married Edith Florence Jervis of Staffordshire and the couple had 5 children (including Captain George Jervis Wood). He was a justice of the peace and deputy lieutenant of County Durham.

He was elected as the member of parliament (MP) for Houghton-le-Spring at the 1886 general election, having contested the seat unsuccessfully in 1885. He was defeated at the 1892 general election. He was believed to have been defeated by the votes of local miners who had been engaged in a lengthy strike and of Irish immigrants due to his opposition to Home Rule. He died from typhoid fever later that year in Half Moon Street, Piccadilly, London, aged 60. He was buried in the churchyard at Saltwood near Hythe, Kent on 29 December.

Parliament of the United Kingdom
Preceded by John Wilson	Member of Parliament for Houghton-le-Spring; 1886 – 1892	Succeeded by Henry Fenwick
