= Thomas Tickler =

British politician

Thomas Tickler in 1927

Tommy Tickler (30 September 1852 – 19 January 1938) was an English businessman and Conservative Party politician from Grimsby in Lincolnshire.

== Life ==
Tickler was the son of George Tickler, a miller from Withern in Lincolnshire . He established his own fruit growers and preservers business, serving as managing director (MD) of T.G. Tickler Ltd, which operated from Grimsby and Southall, and was also MD of Heathcote Pottery Ltd of Swadlincote in Derbyshire. He was a justice of the peace (J.P) in Grimsby, and for fifteen years he was a member of Grimsby Town Council, serving as mayor in 1907.

Tickler was elected as the member of parliament (MP) for Great Grimsby at a by-election in May 1914 following the death of the Conservative MP Sir George Doughty. Doughty had held the seat for almost 20 years, with a short break in 1910.

== Family ==
In 1878 he married his childhood companion, Frances Wells, second daughter of W. T. Wells, of The Hall, Withern. All five of his sons served in the British army and survived the First World War.

== Ticklers Jam ==
From a small grocery business established in 1877, Tickler soon ran one of the largest factories in Grimsby, producing jam and marmalade. 'Tickler's Fruit Growers & Preservers' was taken over in the late 1950s.

At the outbreak of World War I, Ticklers secured a contract with the government to supply front lines with plum-and-apple jam – a contract worth £1 million between 1914 and 1918 (equivalent to £70 million in 2024). Its empty jam tins were used as makeshift grenades referred to as 'Tickler's artillery'.

== In popular culture ==
A song about Tickler's Jam was popular with British troops in the trenches, and is nostalgically sung by Robert Graves in one interview. The song went:

Tickler's Jam, Tickler's Jam,

How I love old Tickler's Jam,

Plum and apple in one-pound pots,

Sent from Blighty in ten-ton lots

Every night when I'm asleep,

I'm dreaming that I am,

Forcing my way through the Dardanelles,

With a ton of Tickler's jam.

https://www.youtube.com/watch?v=v1gl6dHuAzQ

Parliament of the United Kingdom
Preceded by Sir George Doughty	Member of Parliament for Great Grimsby; 1914–1922	Succeeded by Tom Sutcliffe
