= Thomas Urwin (politician) =

British politician (1912–1985)

Thomas William Urwin MP (9 June 1912 – 14 December 1985) was a British Labour Party politician.

Urwin worked as a trade union organiser and was divisional secretary of the Amalgamated Union of Building Trade Workers. He served as a councillor on Houghton-le-Spring Urban District Council, latterly as chairman from 1954 until 1955.

Urwin was the Member of Parliament (MP) for Houghton-le-Spring from 1964 to 1983. He was a minister for Economic Affairs from 1968 to 1969, and for Local Government and Regional Planning from 1969 to 1970.

Parliament of the United Kingdom
Preceded by Billy Blyton	Member of Parliament for Houghton-le-Spring; 1964–1983	Constituency abolished (see Houghton & Washington)
