= Maude Millett =

British actress (1867–1920)

In The Private Secretary, 1885

Ethel Maude Millett (8 November 1867 – 16 February 1920) was a British actress of the late 19th and early 20th centuries, known for her roles in drawing room comedies. She created roles in plays by Arthur Wing Pinero, Oscar Wilde and J. M. Barrie among others.

== Life and career ==
Millett was born in Rajanpur (now in Pakistan, but then part of India), the daughter of Colonel Hugh Millett and his wife Julia, née Childs. She made her first appearance on the stage at the old Novelty Theatre in 1884, and as a result she was engaged by Charles Hawtrey for the part of Eva Webster in The Private Secretary, which was then running at the Globe Theatre. Two years later she appeared with Kate Vaughan at the Gaiety Theatre. When George Alexander moved from the Avenue Theatre to the St James's at the end of 1890 she was a member of his company, playing Kate Merryweather in C. Haddon Chambers's The Idler and Blanche Ferraby in R. C. Carton's Liberty Hall. When Alexander staged the first production of The Second Mrs Tanqueray (1893), she played Ellean to the Paula of Mrs Patrick Campbell.

In 1895, at the Haymarket Theatre Millett, in the role of Mabel Chiltern, was one of the principal players in the premiere of Oscar Wilde's An Ideal Husband, with Hawtrey, Lewis Waller, Florence West and Julia Neilson. In the same year she appeared with Charles Wyndham, Waller and Neilson in Carton's The Home Secretary. It was later said of her:

Her services were always in great demand for comedy of this drawing-room kind, and at one time in her career there was no actress who was more frequently photographed—in fact, it is said that no undergraduate's room was complete without her picture.

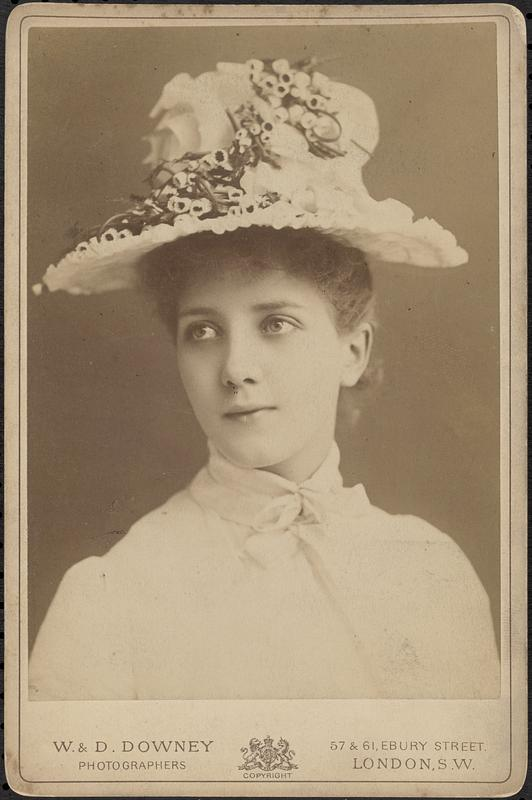
Maude Millet, [ca. 1884–1910]. Cabinet Card Collection, Boston Public Library

In February 1897 Millett married Henry Lancelot Tennant, an officer in the Royal Artillery, and temporarily retired from the stage. They had one child, a son, who followed his father into the army. She returned to the stage in 1899 for a revival of Sweet Lavender at Terry's Theatre, and appeared in West End productions from time to time in the early years of the 20th century. One of her last appearances on the stage was in Gerald du Maurier's production of Sir James Barrie's fantasy Dear Brutus at Wyndham's Theatre, in 1917.

Millett died in a nursing home in Teignmouth, Devon, aged 52, on 16 February 1920. Her husband outlived her.

== References and sources ==
=== Sources ===
- Wearing, J. P. (1976). The London Stage, 1890–1899: A Calendar of Plays and Players. Metuchen: Scarecrow Press. ISBN 978-0-81-080910-9.
- Wearing, J. P. (1981). The London Stage, 1900–1909: A Calendar of Plays and Players. Metuchen: Scarecrow Press. OCLC 1245534136.
- Wilde, Oscar (1966). Plays. London: Penguin. OCLC 16004478.
