= George Doughty (politician) =

British politician

George Doughty

Sir George Doughty JP (13 March 1854 – 27 April 1914) was a British ship-owner and politician from Grimsby in Lincolnshire. He sat in the House of Commons for most of the period from 1895 to 1914, first as a Liberal, then a Liberal Unionist, and finally as a Conservative.

Doughty was the son of William Doughty from Grimsby. He was educated at the Wesleyan Higher Grade School in Grimsby, and became a merchant, a ship-owner, and a partner in the Grimsby-based firm of Hagerup, Doughty and Company Ltd. He became an alderman of Grimsby, and was twice Mayor of the town, and was a Justice of the Peace (J.P.) for the Lindsey area of Lincolnshire.

Standing as a member of the Liberal Party, Doughty was elected at the 1895 general election as the Member of Parliament for Great Grimsby, defeating the sitting Liberal Unionist MP Edward Heneage; by a narrow majority of just 181 votes (2.2%).

However, in 1898 Doughty himself left the Liberal Party to join the Liberal Unionists, and offered himself to the voters of Grimsby for re-election. He resigned his seat on 21 July 1898 by taking the post of Steward of the Chiltern Hundreds, and at the resulting by-election he was re-elected on 2 August 1898 with an increased majority of 1,751 votes (21.5% of the total).

He was returned unopposed in 1900, and held the seat at a contested election in 1906 with a majority of 18.2% of the votes. However, at the January 1910 election he was defeated by the Liberal Party candidate Thomas Wing.

He ousted Wing at the December 1910 election, retaking the seat with a majority 698 votes (4.6%), and two years later became a Conservative Party MP when the Liberal Unionists formally merged with Conservatives (although in practice the two parties had been largely indistinguishable for more than a decade).

He was knighted in the King's Birthday Honours in 1904.

On 16 August 1907 Doughty married Australian journalist and author Eugenia Stone at the Catholic Church of St James, Manchester Square, London.

In April 1914, Doughty died suddenly at Waltham Old Hall, Lincolnshire, aged 60. He had been in "indifferent health for some months" following an operation in New York while travelling back to England from British Columbia.

Parliament of the United Kingdom
Preceded by Edward Heneage	Member of Parliament for Great Grimsby; 1895 – January 1910	Succeeded by Thomas Wing
Preceded by Thomas Wing	Member of Parliament for Great Grimsby; December 1910 – 1914	Succeeded by Thomas Tickler
