= H. H. Vincent (actor) =

English actor

Vincent as Mr Briginshaw in R. C. Carton's Liberty Hall (1892)

Henry Hyam Vincent Barnett (1848 – 19 October 1913), known professionally as H. H. Vincent was an English actor. After playing romantic leads early in his career he worked in Australia as an actor and director during the 1880s and on returning to Britain in 1890 he established himself as a character actor at the St James's Theatre, London, where he created roles including Lord Augustus Lorton in Oscar Wilde's Lady Windermere's Fan (1892), Mr Briginshaw in R. C. Carton's Liberty Hall (1892) and Dr Chasuble in Wilde's The Importance of Being Earnest (1895)

== Life and career ==
=== Early years ===
Vincent was born in Liverpool, the son of Joseph Barnett and his wife Mary. After working in a merchant's office he was engaged as a supporting actor by a theatre company in Bolton, Lancashire. He made his debut in September 1867 in a play in blank verse, John Fenton, the Man of the People, appearing under the stage name "Henry H. Vincent". He quickly graduated to leading roles in theatres in England and Scotland, and made his London debut in 1875, playing Romeo in a one-off performance of Romeo and Juliet, He was soon established as a member of the Globe Theatre company under the management of Edward Righton. The Morning Post commented, "Mr H. H. Vincent, an actor new to London, is judging from his performance last light, a great acquisition ... a touch of pathos that went straight to the hearts of the audience." In 1877 he married Kate Chart. They had no children.

In 1878 Vincent worked in Australia for the first time, and after appearing in Melbourne, he went to New Zealand, touring in a wide range of mostly Shakespearean roles with William Creswick's company, for which in addition to acting, he was stage manager. (Note: In the 19th century, the term "stage-manager" covered the artistic functions now ascribed to directors as well as the purely technical aspects of staging to which "stage-manager" has subsequently come to be restricted.) When the theatrical firm Williamson, Garner and Musgrove was formed in 1882 Vincent was its first general manager, presiding over the firm's theatres in Melbourne and Sydney and four or five touring companies until 1890.

=== Later years ===
Vincent, second from right, as Lord Augustus Lorton in Lady Windermere's Fan (1892)

After returning to England, Vincent appeared in the role of Max Harkaway in London Assurance at the Criterion Theatre (1890), in a cast including Charles Wyndham, Arthur Bourchier, Cyril Maude, William Farren, and Mary Moore. After appearing with H. B. Irving's company at the Garrick Theatre, in T. W. Robertson's School (1891), he joined George Alexander at the St James's Theatre, where in addition to playing character parts he was Alexander's stage manager. Among the roles he created with Alexander's company were Lord Augustus Lorton in Oscar Wilde's Lady Windermere's Fan (1892), J. Briginshaw in R. C. Carton's Liberty Hall (1892), Dr Chasuble in Wilde's The Importance of Being Earnest (1895) and General Chichele in Arthur Wing Pinero's The Princess and the Butterfly (1897) He made a last visit to Australia in 1902 for J. C. Williamson's, directing and appearing in a spectacular production of Ben-Hur, and directing Gillette's hugely successful "Sherlock Holmes" play starring Cuyler Hastings, McCarthy's If I Were King, and Lennox's The Marriage of Kitty, among others.

Vincent left Sydney in June 1905 and shortly retired from the stage, settling in Exmouth and later Bath, where he died after a short illness on 19 October 1913.
