= Robert Cameron (British politician) =

British politician

Robert Cameron MP

Member of Parliament for Houghton-le-Spring
- In office 1895–1913
- Preceded by: Henry Fenwick
- Succeeded by: Thomas Wing

Personal details
- Born: 1825
- Died: 13 February 1913 (aged 87–88)
- Party: Liberal Party

Robert Cameron MP (1825 – 13 February 1913) was a Liberal Party politician in the United Kingdom.

== Biography ==
Before he took office, he was a schoolmaster.

At the 1895 general election, he was elected as Member of Parliament (MP) for Houghton-le-Spring in County Durham, and held the seat until he died in office in 1913, at age 87.

== See also ==
- Leigh Rayment's Historical List of MPs

Parliament of the United Kingdom
Preceded by Henry Fenwick	Member of Parliament for Houghton-le-Spring; 1895–1913	Succeeded by Thomas Wing
