= Eugenia Stone =

Australian journalist

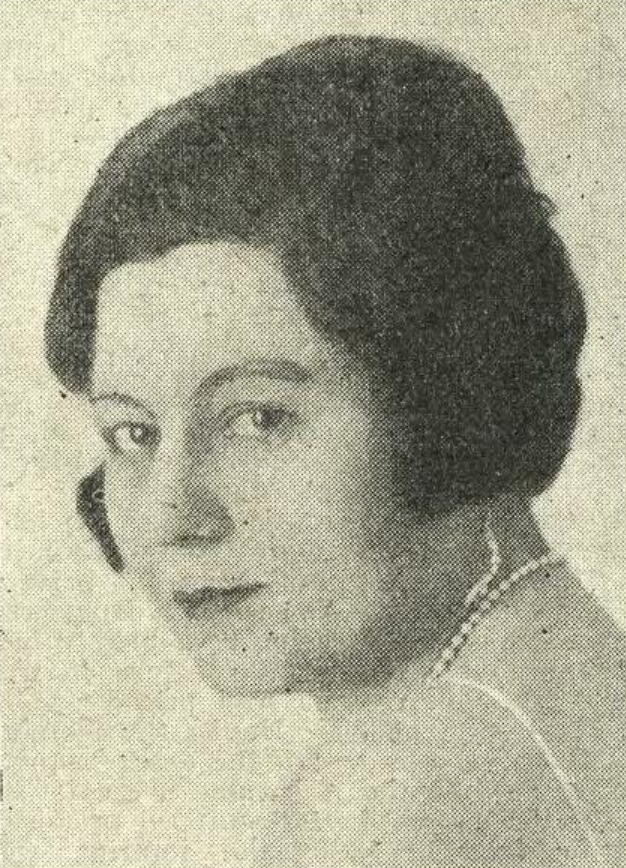
Eugenia Stone

Eugenia Bertuance Stone (c. 1874 – 20 June 1934), in later life referred to as Eugenia, Lady Doughty, was an Australian journalist, later the wife and widow of Sir George Doughty.

== History ==
Stone was born in Melbourne of Irish Catholic ancestry, a daughter of John Stone. She had poems published in the Adelaide Critic and other magazines, and worked as journalist for the Melbourne magazine Table Talk. She also served as Melbourne correspondent for The Bulletin under the byline "Tryphena".

In February 1907 she sailed to London on the SS Marmora as secretary to Prime Minister Alfred Deakin, who was to attend a Colonial Conference. A fellow-passenger was Sir George Doughty (1854–1914), who had been a widower since 1904. In July 1907 Stone and Doughty were engaged to be married, which event took place on 16 August 1907 at the (Catholic) Church of St James, Manchester Square, London. Sir George and Lady Eugenie were renowned for their hospitality toward visiting actors and other artists from Australia.

Sir George Doughty died in 1914.

The widow Lady Doughty was co-respondent in a divorce case in 1923, which related to her affair with a married man in the years 1920–21. A few of her love-letters, which figured prominently in the divorce case, were published. She died at her home in Esher, Surrey, on 20 June 1934.

Doughty Place, in the Canberra suburb of Gilmore, is named in her honour.

== Publications ==
Her best-known book was The Cheerful Way (1912).
