= Thomas Wing (politician) =

Tom Wing

Thomas Edward Wing MP (12 August 1853 – 12 May 1935) was a Liberal Party politician in the United Kingdom.

He was elected at the January 1910 general election as member of parliament (MP) for Grimsby, but lost that seat at the general election in December 1910.

He was returned to Parliament as MP for Houghton-le-Spring in County Durham at a by-election in 1913 following the death of the Liberal MP Robert Cameron. He was defeated again at the 1918 general election, this time by the Labour candidate Robert Richardson.

After his defeat, he unsuccessfully contested the Dartford by-election in 1920. He also stood in Spennymoor at the 1922 election, Grimsby for the 1924 general election and in Houghton-le-Spring for the 1929 election but never returned to the House of Commons.

Parliament of the United Kingdom
Preceded by George Doughty	Member of Parliament for Great Grimsby; January 1910 – December 1910	Succeeded by George Doughty
Preceded by Robert Cameron	Member of Parliament for Houghton-le-Spring; 1913–1918	Succeeded by Robert Richardson
