= Billy Blyton, Baron Blyton =

British politician

The Right Honourable The Lord Blyton MP
- by Elliott & Fry, 1950

Member of Parliament for Houghton-le-Spring
- In office 5 July 1945 – 25 September 1964
- Preceded by: William Stewart
- Succeeded by: Thomas Urwin

Personal details
- Born: William Reid Blyton; 2 May 1899 South Shields, England
- Died: 25 October 1987 (aged 88) South Shields, England
- Party: Labour
- Spouse: Jennie Ord (m. 1919; died 1971)
- Children: 3

William Reid Blyton, Baron Blyton MP (2 May 1899 – 25 October 1987) was a British Labour Party politician who served as Member of Parliament (MP) for Houghton-le-Spring in the County of Durham from 1945 to 1964.

== Early life ==
Born in Bowman Street, in the Tyne Dock area of South Shields, Tyne & Wear (then in County Durham), he attended Holy Trinity Primary School and Dean Road Secondary Modern.

Blyton married Jane "Jennie" Ord at Holy Trinity Church in South Shields on 26 December 1919, and they had three daughters - Jennie, Marion and Rita.

On leaving school at age fourteen, he began an apprenticeship at Harton Colliery, where he worked for the next 32 years. Blyton represented Harton Miners Lodge and was also chairman of the local Labour Party. He remained a great trade union man throughout his life, becoming a member of the National Union of Mineworkers, and served as a member of South Shields Town Council, chairing its education and electricity committees.

During the First World War, he served in the submarine service.

== Political career ==
Blyton was elected Member of Parliament for Houghton-le-Spring, County Durham, at the 1945 general election, serving until 1964.

When MPs were discussing the 1960 Betting and Gaming Act, he successfully fought to have dominoes and Fives and Threes legally recognised as games of skill, rather than chance, saying: "5s and 3s takes a great deal more skill, if one wants to win, than chess – that monotonous game which I see played in the smoking room so often. It also requires more skill than playing draughts, in trying to think what the next moves will be."

He was created a life peer as Baron Blyton, of South Shields in the County of Durham, by Harold Wilson on 16 December 1964. When approached by the College of Arms about commissioning a coat of arms, he asked if he could have a pint of brown ale quartered with a greyhound rampant, crossed darts and a miner's lamp. On being informed that he could not, he cheerfully retorted that he would keep his £300 then.

In a debate in the House of Lords in 1965, responding to a statement by Lord Stonham, he made clear his views on the Conservative Party, saying: "My Lords, does my noble friend not recognise that the Conservative Party, both here and in another place, are very thin-skinned? Does he appreciate that my noble friend Lord Stonham's words this weekend are not incomparable with what Sir Winston Churchill said about the Conservative Party? He said: 'The Conservative Party is not a party but a conspiracy … the great vested interests handed together in a formidable federation; corruption at home, aggression to cover it up abroad, the trickery of tariff juggles, the tyranny of a party machine, sentiment by the bucketful, patriotism by the imperial pint, the open hand at the public Exchequer. The open door at the public house, dear food for the million, cheap labour for the millionaire … the Conservative Party is nothing less than a deliberate attempt on the part of important sections of the propertied classes to transfer their burdens to the shoulders of the masses of the people and to claim greater profits for the investment of their capital by charging higher prices. My noble friend's words are no worse than the words of Sir Winston Churchill, whom we all revered."

Today, he would have been viewed as a eurosceptic. In 1972, as the United Kingdom prepared to join the European Union, he said: "The stark proposal... is to hand over power to legislate for, govern and tax British people in perpetuity to bodies outside this country.... This Treaty takes away the sovereignty of Britain."

In a 1969 debate on the Loch Ness Monster, he said: "My lords, is my noble friend aware that it will be an act of sacrilege to take away from the Scottish Tourist Board the myth of the monster of Loch Ness by which they get many gullible tourists every year?"

He was the Chairman of the Governors at South Shields Grammar Technical School for Boys.

A primary school in South Shields is named after him. He was made a Freeman of the town of South Shields in 1950.

== Later life ==
He lived in later life in the Biddick Hall area of the town, where he moved with his family in the 1930s. He was famed for his jovial and approachable personality and is claimed to have displayed none of the self-importance often associated with successful politicians. He was an active member of Simonside Social Club, where he was nicknamed "Baron Billy".

His wife, Jennie, died in 1971, and he died in South Shields on 25 October 1987, at the age of 88.

Parliament of the United Kingdom
Preceded by William Stewart	Member of Parliament for Houghton-le-Spring; 1945–1964	Succeeded by Thomas Urwin
