= Sir Robert Chapman, 1st Baronet =

British soldier and Conservative Party politician (1880–1963)

Colonel Sir Robert Chapman Bt CB CMG CBE DSO OStJ TD JP DL MP
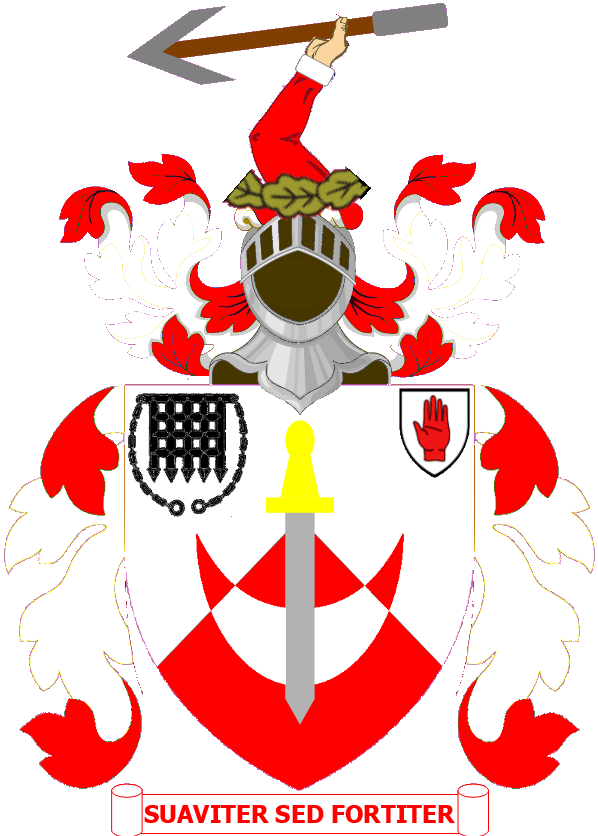

Member of Parliament for Houghton-le-Spring
- In office 1931–1935
- Preceded by: Robert Richardson
- Succeeded by: William Stewart

Personal details
- Born: 3 March 1880 Westoe, South Shields, County Durham, England
- Died: 31 July 1963 (aged 83) Undercliff, Cleadon, Sunderland, England
- Party: Conservative
- Spouse: Hélène Paris MacGowan
- Children: Sir Robert MacGowan Chapman, 2nd Baronet; Henry James Nicholas Chapman
- Military career
- Allegiance: United Kingdom
- Branch: British Army
- Service years: 1902–1937
- Rank: Colonel
- Service number: 7749
- Unit: Royal Artillery
- Commands: 4th Durham Howitzer Brigade
- Conflicts: First World War
- Awards: Companion of the Order of the Bath; Companion of the Order of St Michael and St George; Commander of the Order of the British Empire; Distinguished Service Order; Territorial Decoration; Efficiency Decoration; Légion d'honneur Mention in Despatches (x4)

Sir Robert Chapman, 1st Baronet CB, CMG, CBE, DSO, OStJ, TD, JP, DL, MP, Bt (3 March 1880 – 31 July 1963) was a British soldier and Conservative Party politician.

== Early life ==
Chapman was the son of Henry Chapman, a Chartered Accountant and prominent businessman in South Shields, and Dora Gibson. He was educated at South Shields High School, Robert was one of seven brothers who went to the school, and came to be School Captain in 1896. He left to go to London University, where he gained a BA. When he finished at university he joined the family's accountancy firm.

== Military service ==
Chapman commissioned into the 3rd Durham Royal Garrison Artillery in 1902, becoming a captain in 1904. In 1908, upon the creation of the Territorial Force his unit was transferred to the Royal Field Artillery, becoming the 4th Durham (Howitzer) Brigade, after which he was promoted to the rank of Major in December 1908 (with authority dated 1 April 1908), thus taking command of his unit. He served in the First World War, reaching the rank of Lieutenant Colonel and being awarded the Distinguished Service Order in 1916. In 1917 he was awarded the Legion 'd'Honneur. He was appointed a Companion of the Order of St Michael and St George in 1918. He was awarded a Territorial Decoration in 1919. He became a Brevet Colonel in 1924 and substantive Colonel in 1925. He became the Honorary Colonel of his former regiment in 1935, retiring from the army in 1937. He was awarded the Efficiency Decoration in 1955.

== Political career ==
In 1921, Chapman was elected to be one of the first Councillors for the new Harton Ward, in the same year he was appointed Deputy Lieutenant for County Durham. In 1931 he became Mayor of South Shields. He was elected at the 1931 general election as Member of Parliament (MP) for the Houghton-le-Spring constituency in County Durham. It was usually a safe seat for the Labour, but fell to the Conservatives as one of their many gains that year, when Labour split over budgetary policy and Ramsay MacDonald formed a National Government.

Chapman was defeated by the Labour candidate at the 1935 general election, and did not stand for Parliament again. He was High Sheriff of Durham in 1940. On 8 June 1944 he was appointed a Companion of the Order of the Bath, and on 1 January 1945 he was created a Commander of the Order of the British Empire. In 1949, he was created Vice-Lieutenant of County Durham. On 14 March 1950 he was appointed knight bachelor, he was appointed an Officer of the Order of St John on 23 June 1950. On 30 January 1958 he was created a baronet, of Cleadon in the County of Durham.

== Personal life ==
Chapman married Hélène Paris (1894–1980), daughter of James George MacGowan, in 1909. He died on 31 July 1963, aged 83, and was succeeded in the baronetcy by his eldest son Robert.

== Honours ==
- 30 January 1958: Baronet, 1st Baronet Chapman of Cleadon
- 23 June 1950: Officer of the Order of St John
- 14 March 1950: Knight Bachelor
- 1 January 1945: Commander of the Order of the British Empire
- 8 June 1944: Companion of the Order of the Bath
- 1 January 1918: Companion of the Order of St Michael and St George
- 1 May 1917: Chevalier de Légion d'honneur (France)
- 11 January 1916: Distinguished Service Order
- 4 November 1919: Territorial Decoration
- 1 January 1955: Efficiency Decoration

=== Honorary Military Appointments ===
- 1935 – 1950: Honorary Colonel, 74th (Northumbrian) Field Regiment Royal Artillery

=== Arms ===
Coat of arms of Sir Robert Chapman, 1st Baronet
| Crest Issuant from a wreath of oak Proper a dexter arm embowed vested Gules cuffed Argent grasping in the hand a harpoon also Proper. Escutcheon Per chevron Argent and Gules a crescent counterchanged in dexter chief a portcullis chained Sable over all in pale a sword point downwards Proper pommel and hilt Or. Motto Suaviter Sed Fortiter |

Parliament of the United Kingdom
| Preceded by Robert Richardson | Member of Parliament for Houghton-le-Spring; 1931–1935 | Succeeded by William Stewart |
Honorary titles
| Preceded by Sir William Grey, Bt. | High Sheriff of Durham; 1940–1941 | Succeeded by Harold Kitching |
Baronetage of the United Kingdom
| New creation | Baronet (of Cleadon); 1958–1963 | Succeeded by Robert Macgowan Chapman |
