= Sir David Chapman, 3rd Baronet =

British businessman and investment banker

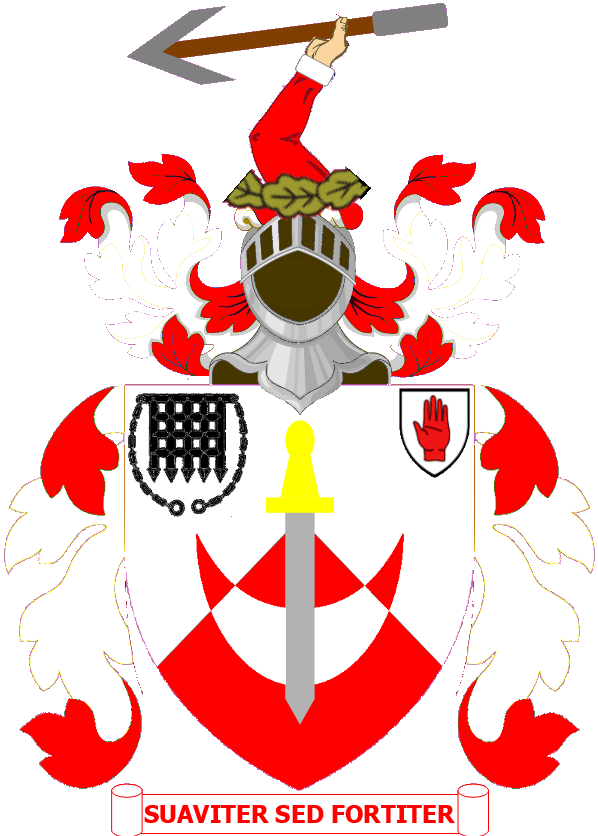
Chapman's armorial achievement

Sir David Robert Macgowan Chapman, 3rd Baronet DL (16 December 1941) is a British businessman, investment banker, and Deputy Lieutenant for Tyne and Wear.

== Early life ==
Chapman was born in Cleadon in County Durham (now Tyne and Wear) to Sir Robert Macgowan Chapman and Barbara May Tonks.

== Later life ==
Chapman inherited the Chapman baronetcy after his father's death, Sir Robert Macgowan Chapman, on 2 August 1987. He was appointed High Sheriff of Tyne and Wear for 1993-1994, and in 1997 was appointed Deputy Lieutenant of Tyne and Wear.

== Honours ==
- 2 August 1987: Baronet, 3rd Baronet Chapman of Cleadon

=== Arms ===
Coat of arms of Sir David Chapman, 3rd Baronet
Crest Issuant from a wreath of oak, Proper a dexter arm embowed vested Gules cuffed Argent, grasping in the hand a harpoon, which is also Proper. Escutcheon Per chevron Argent and Gules a crescent counterchanged in dexter chief a portcullis chained Sable over all in pale a sword point downwards Proper pommel and hilt Or. Motto Suaviter Sed Fortiter

Honorary titles
Preceded by Hugh Goundry Brown	High Sheriff of Tyne and Wear; 1993–1994	Succeeded by Roger Charlton Spoor, OBE, RD
Baronetage of England
Preceded by Robert Macgowan Chapman	Baronet (of Cleadon); 1987 – present	Incumbent
