= Henry Fenwick (Houghton-le-Spring MP) =

Colonel Henry Thomas Fenwick CMG DSO MVO MP (20 December 1863 – 30 August 1939) was a British Army officer and Liberal Party politician.

== Biography ==
Fenwick was the son of Henry Fenwick and Jane Lutwidge Cookson, and entered the army in 1885.

He changed to a political career when he was elected as the member of parliament (MP) for Houghton-le-Spring at the 1892 general election, and held the seat until he stood down at the 1895 general election.

In 1899 he was again in active service, as 2nd in Command of the Royal Horse Guards. He served with the regiment during the Second Boer War in South Africa 1899–1901, was mentioned in despatches, and appointed a Companion of the Distinguished Service Order (DSO) for his services in November 1900.

After the war, he was appointed Commander of the Royal Horse Guards. In later life, he was lord of the manor of Stenigot, Lincolnshire.

Parliament of the United Kingdom
Preceded by Nicholas Wood	Member of Parliament for Houghton-le-Spring; 1892 – 1895	Succeeded by Robert Cameron
