= Robert Richardson (Labour politician) =

British politician

Robert Richardson MP (1 February 1862 – 28 December 1943) was a Labour Party politician in the United Kingdom.

Richardson was educated at Ryhope National School before becoming a coal miner in 1871, serving as a checkweighman from 1900. His entry in the Times House of Commons 1919 noted that he had 'worked at all kind of jobs in the pit'. He became active in the Durham Miners' Association, serving on its executive from 1897.

Richardson was elected to Durham County Council in 1901, the Ryhope Board of Guardians in 1904, and also Sunderland Rural District Council in 1904, chairing this from 1910 to 1913. He was elected at the 1918 general election as member of parliament for Houghton-le-Spring in County Durham, defeating the sitting Liberal MP Thomas Edward Wing by 689 votes in a close three-way contest. Richardson held the seat until the 1931 general election, when Labour split over budgetary policy and its leader Ramsay MacDonald left the party to form a National Government. His Conservative Party successor Robert Chapman served only one term in Parliament, as Labour regained the seat at the 1935 general election; but Richardson did not stand again after his defeat.

Parliament of the United Kingdom
Preceded by Thomas Wing	Member of Parliament for Houghton-le-Spring; 1918–1931	Succeeded by Robert Chapman
