= Houghton-le-Spring (constituency) =

Parliamentary constituency in the United Kingdom, 1885–1983

- Former county constituency for the House of Commons
- Boundary of Houghton-le-Spring in County Durham, boundaries 1974–1983
- County: County Durham
- Major settlements: Houghton-le-Spring

1885–1983
- Seats: One
- Created from: South Durham
- Replaced by: Houghton & Washington and Easington

Houghton-le-Spring was a county constituency of the House of Commons of the Parliament of the United Kingdom from 1885 to 1983. Centred on the town of Houghton-le-Spring, now part of the City of Sunderland, it elected one Member of Parliament (MP) by the first-past-the-post system of election.

== History ==
=== Creation ===
The constituency was created for the 1885 general election by the Redistribution of Seats Act 1885 as one of eight new single-member divisions of the county of Durham, replacing the two 2-member seats of North Durham and South Durham. The seat included the towns of Houghton-le-Spring, Hetton-le-Hole and Seaham and areas to the south and west of the borough of Sunderland. The majority now lies within the City of Sunderland in the metropolitan county of Tyne and Wear.

=== Boundaries ===
==== 1885–1918 ====
- The Sessional Divisions of Houghton-le-Spring, Sunderland and Seaham Harbour (part); and
- The Municipal Borough of Sunderland

NB included only non-resident freeholders in the parliamentary borough of Sunderland.

See map on Vision of Britain website.

==== 1918–1950 ====
- The Urban District of Houghton-le-Spring;
- the Rural Districts of South Shields and Sunderland; and
- part of the Rural District of Houghton-le-Spring.

Rural/coastal areas between South Shields and Sunderland, including the Boldons, transferred from Jarrow. Lost Hetton-le-Hole to the new Durham Division of County Durham and Seaham to the new Seaham Division.

==== 1950–1955 ====
- The Urban Districts of Houghton-le-Spring and Seaham; and
- the Rural District of Sunderland.

Seaham (including Seaham Harbour) transferred back from the abolished Seaham Division. Lost areas to the Borough Constituencies of South Shields, Sunderland North and Sunderland South as a result of the expansion of the respective County Boroughs. Remaining northern areas, largely comprising the Urban District of Boldon (which had largely succeeded the abolished Rural District of South Shields), transferred to Jarrow.

==== 1955–1974 ====
- The Urban Districts of Houghton-le-Spring and Seaham; and
- the Rural District of Sunderland except the parts of the parishes of Ford, Herrington, Hylton, and Silksworth added to the County Borough of Sunderland by the Sunderland Extension Act 1950 (14 Geo. 6. c. liv).

==== 1974–1983 ====
- The Urban Districts of Hetton, Houghton-le-Spring, and Seaham; and
- in the Rural District of Easington, the parishes of Burdon, Cold Hesledon, Dalton-le-Dale, East Murton, Seaton with Slingley, and Warden Law.

The Urban District of Hetton transferred back from Durham and northern parts of the Rural District of Easington, including East Murton, transferred from Easington. Parts comprising the former Rural District of Sunderland, which had been largely absorbed by the County Borough, were transferred to Sunderland North (Hylton) and Sunderland South (Ryhope and Silksworth).

=== Abolition ===
The seat was abolished for the 1983 general election as a result of the periodic review of parliamentary constituencies following the re-organisation of local government under the Local Government Act 1972. On abolition, Seaham and East Murton, which had been retained within the county of Durham and comprised about 40% of the electorate, were returned to the Easington constituency. The remainder, including Houghton-le-Spring and Hetton-le-Hole, was included in the new constituency of Houghton and Washington in the county of Tyne and Wear.

== Members of Parliament ==
Election	Member	Party
1885	John Wilson	Liberal
1886	Nicholas Wood	Conservative
1892	Henry Fenwick	Liberal
1895	Robert Cameron	Liberal
1913 by-election	Tom Wing	Liberal
1918	Robert Richardson	Labour
1931	Robert Chapman	Conservative
1935	William Stewart	Labour
1945	Bill Blyton	Labour
1964	Tom Urwin	Labour
1983	constituency abolished	

== Elections ==
=== Elections in the 1880s ===
John Wilson

General election 1885: Houghton-le-Spring
Party	Candidate	Votes	%	±%
Lib-Lab	John Wilson	6,511	57.7	
Conservative	Nicholas Wood	4,767	42.3	
Majority		1,744	15.4	
Turnout		11,278	86.8	
Registered electors		12,992		
Lib-Lab win (new seat)				

General election 1886: Houghton-le-Spring
Party	Candidate	Votes	%	±%
Conservative	Nicholas Wood	5,870	53.7	+11.4
Lib-Lab	John Wilson	5,059	46.3	−11.4
Majority		811	7.4	N/A
Turnout		10,929	84.1	−2.7
Registered electors		12,992		
Conservative gain from Lib-Lab		Swing	+11.4	

=== Elections in the 1890s ===
General election 1892: Houghton-le-Spring
Party	Candidate	Votes	%	±%
Liberal	Henry Fenwick	6,256	52.6	+6.3
Conservative	Nicholas Wood	4,823	40.6	−13.1
Independent Liberal and Direct Veto	Jonathan Hargrove (Note: Also a member of the United Kingdom Alliance)	814	6.8	New
Majority		1,433	12.0	N/A
Turnout		11,893	86.7	+2.6
Registered electors		13,716		
Liberal gain from Conservative		Swing	+9.7	

Robert Cameron

General election 1895: Houghton-le-Spring
Party	Candidate	Votes	%	±%
Liberal	Robert Cameron	6,592	53.6	+1.0
Conservative	Vincent Charles Stuart Wortley Corbett	5,711	46.4	+5.8
Majority		881	7.2	−4.8
Turnout		12,303	88.0	+1.3
Liberal hold		Swing	−2.4	

=== Elections in the 1900s ===
General election 1900: Houghton-le-Spring
Party	Candidate	Votes	%	±%
Liberal	Robert Cameron	6,865	58.3	+4.7
Conservative	Ralph Stapleton Ward-Jackson	4,917	41.7	−4.7
Majority		1,948	16.6	+9.4
Turnout		11,782	82.3	−5.7
Registered electors		14,317		
Liberal hold		Swing	+4.7	

General election 1906: Houghton-le-Spring
Party	Candidate	Votes	%	±%
Liberal	Robert Cameron	9,429	72.2	+13.9
Liberal Unionist	Roland Edmund Lomax Vaughan Williams	3,639	27.8	−13.9
Majority		5,790	44.4	+27.8
Turnout		13,068	83.2	+0.9
Registered electors		15,711		
Liberal hold		Swing	+13.9	

=== Elections in the 1910s ===
General election January 1910: Houghton-le-Spring
Party	Candidate	Votes	%	±%
Liberal	Robert Cameron	10,393	70.3	−1.9
Conservative	Hugh Sidney Streatfield	4,382	29.7	+1.9
Majority		6,011	40.6	−3.8
Turnout		14,775	84.4	+1.2
Registered electors		17,504		
Liberal hold		Swing	−1.9	

General election December 1910: Houghton-le-Spring
Party	Candidate	Votes	%	±%
Liberal	Robert Cameron	Unopposed		
Liberal hold				

Tom Wing

1913 Houghton-le-Spring by-election
Party	Candidate	Votes	%	±%
Liberal	Thomas Wing	6,930	43.6	N/A
Unionist	Thomas Richardson	4,807	30.2	New
Labour	William House	4,165	26.2	New
Majority		2,123	13.4	N/A
Turnout		15,902	83.6	N/A
Registered electors		19,032		
Liberal hold		Swing	N/A	

General Election 1914–15:

Another General Election was required to take place before the end of 1915. The political parties had been making preparations for an election to take place and by July 1914, the following candidates had been selected;

- Liberal: Thomas Wing
- Unionist:
- Labour: W. P. Richardson

General election 14 December 1918: Houghton-le-Spring
Party		Candidate	Votes	%	±%
	Labour	Robert Richardson	7,315	36.4	N/A
	Liberal	Thomas Wing	6,626	32.9	N/A
C	National Democratic	John Lindsley	6,185	30.7	New
Majority			689	3.5	N/A
Turnout			20,126	61.8	N/A
Registered electors			32,552		
	Labour gain from Liberal		Swing	N/A	
C indicates candidate endorsed by the coalition government.

=== Elections in the 1920s ===
General election 1922: Houghton-le-Spring
Party	Candidate	Votes	%	±%
Labour	Robert Richardson	14,611	51.9	+15.5
Unionist	Walter William Shaw	7,555	26.9	New
Liberal	John Edward Johnston	5,958	21.2	−11.7
Majority		7,056	25.0	+21.5
Turnout		28,124	78.4	+16.6
Registered electors		35,871		
Labour hold		Swing	+13.6	

General election 1923: Houghton-le-Spring
Party	Candidate	Votes	%	±%
Labour	Robert Richardson	15,225	59.3	+7.4
Liberal	Aaron Curry	10,445	40.7	+19.5
Majority		4,780	18.6	−6.4
Turnout		25,670	69.0	−9.4
Registered electors		37,224		
Labour hold		Swing	−6.1	

General election 1924: Houghton-le-Spring
Party	Candidate	Votes	%	±%
Labour	Robert Richardson	17,857	57.8	−1.5
Liberal	Aaron Curry	13,023	42.2	+1.5
Majority		4,834	15.6	−3.0
Turnout		30,880	79.6	+10.6
Registered electors		38,779		
Labour hold		Swing	−1.5	

General election 1929: Houghton-le-Spring
Party	Candidate	Votes	%	±%
Labour	Robert Richardson	25,056	57.1	−0.7
Liberal	Thomas Wing	10,267	23.4	−18.8
Unionist	William George Pearson	8,545	19.5	New
Majority		14,789	33.7	+18.1
Turnout		43,868	80.3	+0.7
Registered electors		54,615		
Labour hold		Swing	+9.1	

=== Elections in the 1930s ===
General election 1931: Houghton-le-Spring
Party	Candidate	Votes	%	±%
Conservative	Robert Chapman	25,549	52.95	
Labour	Robert Richardson	22,700	47.05	
Majority		2,849	5.90	N/A
Turnout		48,249	82.78	
Conservative gain from Labour		Swing		

General election 1935: Houghton-le-Spring
Party	Candidate	Votes	%	±%
Labour	William Stewart	30,665	57.15	
Conservative	Robert Chapman	22,990	42.85	
Majority		7,675	14.30	N/A
Turnout		52,945	82.04	
Labour gain from Conservative		Swing		

=== Election in the 1940s ===
General election 1945: Houghton-le-Spring
Party	Candidate	Votes	%	±%
Labour	Billy Blyton	43,730	66.67	
Conservative	TB Martin	21,864	33.33	
Majority		21,866	33.34	
Turnout		65,594	76.87	
Labour hold		Swing		

=== Elections in the 1950s ===
General election 1950: Houghton-le-Spring
Party	Candidate	Votes	%	±%
Labour	Billy Blyton	36,044	77.14	
Conservative	Beatrice Bolam	10,682	22.86	
Majority		25,362	54.28	
Turnout		46,726	87.22	
Labour hold		Swing		

General election 1951: Houghton-le-Spring
Party	Candidate	Votes	%	±%
Labour	Billy Blyton	37,718	75.80	
Conservative	Beatrice Bolam	12,042	24.20	
Majority		25,676	51.60	
Turnout		49,760	86.61	
Labour hold		Swing		

General election 1955: Houghton-le-Spring
Party	Candidate	Votes	%	±%
Labour	Billy Blyton	33,375	76.11	
Conservative	Thomas Edward Sydney Egerton	10,476	23.89	
Majority		22,899	52.22	
Turnout		43,851	79.49	
Labour hold		Swing		

General election 1959: Houghton-le-Spring
Party	Candidate	Votes	%	±%
Labour	Billy Blyton	35,960	75.93	
Conservative	Andrew Robert Coghill Arbuthnot	11,398	24.07	
Majority		24,562	51.86	
Turnout		47,358	83.41	
Labour hold		Swing		

=== Elections in the 1960s ===
General election 1964: Houghton-le-Spring
Party	Candidate	Votes	%	±%
Labour	Thomas Urwin	32,914	74.82	
Conservative	Peter Coles Price	11,076	25.18	
Majority		21,838	49.64	
Turnout		43,990	78.70	
Labour hold		Swing		

General election 1966: Houghton-le-Spring
Party	Candidate	Votes	%	±%
Labour	Thomas Urwin	32,067	77.51	
Conservative	Frederick Howard Michael Craig-Cooper	9,304	22.49	
Majority		22,763	55.02	
Turnout		41,371	73.88	
Labour hold		Swing		

=== Elections in the 1970s ===
General election 1970: Houghton-le-Spring
Party	Candidate	Votes	%	±%
Labour	Thomas Urwin	32,888	73.41	
Conservative	Frederick Howard Michael Craig-Cooper	11,914	26.59	
Majority		20,974	46.82	
Turnout		44,802	71.60	
Labour hold		Swing		

General election February 1974: Houghton-le-Spring
Party	Candidate	Votes	%	±%
Labour	Thomas Urwin	34,263	76.89	+3.48
Conservative	RC Ritchie	10,300	23.11	−3.48
Majority		23,963	53.77	
Turnout		44,563	75.09	
Labour hold		Swing	+3.48	

General election October 1974: Houghton-le-Spring
Party	Candidate	Votes	%	±%
Labour	Thomas Urwin	29,699	68.44	
Liberal	W Robson	9,298	21.43	New
Conservative	RC Ritchie	4,399	10.14	
Majority		20,401	47.01	
Turnout		43,396	72.44	
Labour hold		Swing		

General election 1979: Houghton-le-Spring
Party	Candidate	Votes	%	±%
Labour	Thomas Urwin	30,181	68.45	
Conservative	Philip Straw	9,105	20.65	
Liberal	J Ellis	4,479	10.16	
Workers Revolutionary	D Temple	326	0.74	New
Majority		21,076	47.80	
Turnout		44,091	72.89	
Labour hold		Swing		

== See also ==
- History of parliamentary constituencies and boundaries in Durham

== Notes and references ==
Notes
