= The Home Secretary =

Play by R. C. Carton

Act IV: Trendel confronts his wife and Dangerfield

The Home Secretary is a four-act play by R. C. Carton, first produced in 1895 in the West End of London.

== Production ==
The play was first given at the Criterion Theatre, London, under the actor-manager Charles Wyndham. It opened on 7 May 1895 and ran for 72 performances until 20 July.

=== Original cast ===
- The Right Hon Duncan Trendel MP – Charles Wyndham
- Sir James Haylett, QC, MP – Alfred Bishop
- Lord Blayver – David S. James
- Frank Trendel – Sydney Brough
- Captain Chesnall – Charles Brookfield
- Mr Thorpe-Didsbury MP – Herman de Lange
- Rixon – H. Deane
- Morris Lecaile – Lewis Waller
- Rhoda Trendel – Julia Neilson
- Lady Clotilda Bramerton – Dolores Drummond
- Esme Bramerton – Maude Millett
- Mrs Thorpe-Didsbury – Mary Moore

=== Revivals ===
The play was revived on 21 October 1895 at the Shaftesbury Theatre. Fred Terry took over the role of Trendel, Lottie Venne played Mrs Thorpe-Didsbury, and Brough, Brookfield, Waller, Neilson and Millett reprised their original roles. The run ended on 13 November, after 21 performances. The piece was staged on Broadway in November 1895, starring Herbert Kelcey and Isabel Irving as the Trendels and J. K. Hackett as Lecaile.

== Plot ==
Trendel and his wife, Rhoda, have drifted apart: she is disillusioned by his change from idealist to party careerist and cabinet minister. She is attracted to Lecaile, who is in fact a dangerous anarchist whose real name, well known to the police, is Dangerfield. He is betrayed by a colleague, and resorts to burglary of Trendel's house to recover an incriminating document. Unknown to him, Rhoda is asleep in an armchair in the room he is searching. She wakes and confronts him. Trendel discovers the two together and jumps to the conclusion that they are carrying on behind his back. To save her reputation, Dangerfield admits his identity and his reason for being in the house. Trendel, touched by Dangerfield's gallant conduct, allows him to depart, but having let an anarchist go, he feels obliged to write to the prime minister resigning his office. Rhoda, moved by this evidence of humanity and scruple on her husband's part, is reconciled with him.

The main plot is interwoven with the romance of Trendel's nephew (and secretary) and the ingénue Esme in the face of her family's attempts to marry her off to an elderly peer. The action includes the comings of goings of friends and colleagues of varying degrees of eccentricity.

== Critical reception ==
The Era thought the characters well written, and the dialogue "smart, unforced and up to date", but found the action slow until the final act. The Morning Post praised the author's skill in balancing the comic, the tender, and briefly near-tragic elements of the piece. The Standard thought the dialogue neatly written, but "the action moves very slowly". When the piece was staged on Broadway, The New York Times found it fluently written, with "a moderate infusion of wit" and serviceable characterisation and plot.

=== Sources ===
- Wearing, J. P. (1976). The London Stage, 1890–1899: A Calendar of Plays and Players. Metuchen: Scarecrow Press. ISBN 978-0-81-080910-9.
