= Sir Robert Chapman, 2nd Baronet =

Lieutenant Colonel Sir Robert Chapman Bt CBE TD JP DL
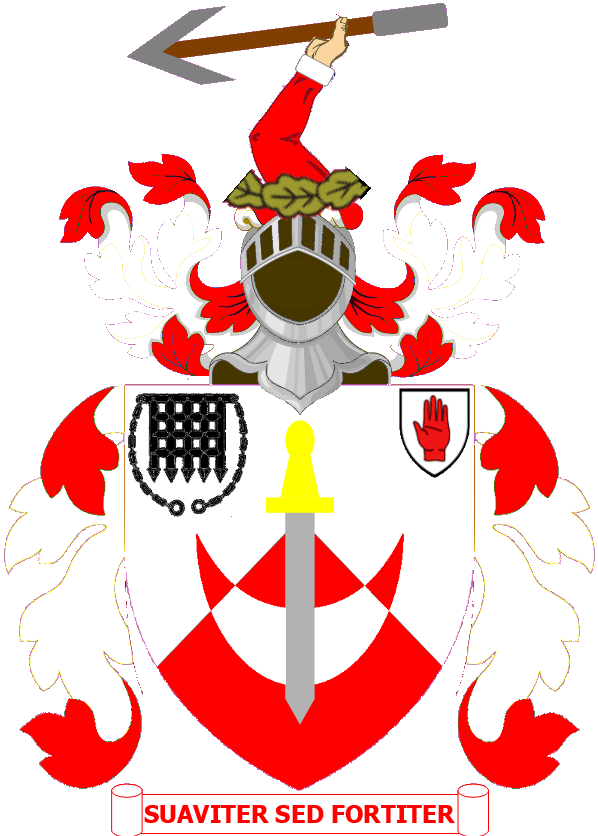
- Born: 12 February 1911
- Died: 2 August 1987 (aged 76); South Shields, Tyne and Wear, England
- Spouse: Barbara May Tonks
- Children: Sir David Robert Macgowan Chapman, 3rd Baronet; Peter Stuart Chapman; Elizabeth Mary Chapman
- Military career
- Allegiance: United Kingdom
- Branch: British Army
- Service years: 1934–?
- Rank: Lieutenant Colonel (Active); Colonel (Honorary)
- Unit: Royal Artillery
- Commands: 124th Heavy Anti-Aircraft Regiment; 325th Regiment, Light Anti-Aircraft Regiment
- Conflicts: Second World War
- Awards: Commander of the Order of the British Empire; Territorial Decoration

Sir Robert MacGowan Chapman, 2nd Baronet, CBE, TD, JP (12 February 1911 – 2 August 1987) was a Territorial Army officer who served as High Sheriff of Durham from 1960 to 1961, Deputy Lieutenant of Durham from 1952 to 1974, and later Vice-Lord-Lieutenant of Tyne and Wear.

== Early life ==
He was the son of Sir Robert Chapman, 1st Baronet and Hélène Paris MacGowan. He was educated at Marlborough College, Marlborough, Wiltshire, England and Corpus Christi College, University of Cambridge, graduating in 1933 with a BA degree, and in 1936 with an MA.

He was commissioned into the Royal Artillery on 10 February 1934. He was registered as a Member, Institute of Chartered Accountants (A.C.A.) in 1938.

He married Barbara May Tonks, daughter of Hubert Tonks, on 18 January 1941.

== Wartime ==
He gained the rank of Captain in 1940 in the GSO(3), AA Command.

Later gaining the rank of Major in 1940 in the GSO(2), 1st AA Corps.

He became commanding officer of the 124th HAA Regiment, Royal Artillery in 1942.

== Later life ==
He was appointed Fellow, Institute of Chartered Accountants (F.C.A.) in 1945. He held the office of Justice of the Peace (J.P.) for County Durham in 1946. He gained the rank of Lieutenant-Colonel in 1948 in the 325th Regiment, Light Anti-Aircraft Regiment, the same regiment which his father had served in. He was awarded the Efficiency Decoration in 1948 and bar. He held the office of Deputy Lieutenant (D.L.) of County Durham in 1952. He held the office of High Sheriff of County Durham in 1960. He was appointed Commander of the Order of the British Empire in 1961 for 'political and public services in the North of England'. He was appointed the Honorary Colonel in 1963 of the 463 (Durham Light Infantry) Light Air Defence Regiment RA (TA). He succeeded as the 2nd Baronet Chapman, on 31 July 1963, after the death of his father. Sir Robert held the office of Vice-Lord-Lieutenant of Tyne and Wear in 1974. He died on 2 August 1987 at age 76 at South Shields, County Durham, England. and was succeeded to the baronetcy by his son Sir David Robert Macgowan Chapman, 3rd Baronet (born 1941).

== Honours ==
- 31 July 1963: Baronet, 2nd Baronet Chapman of Cleadon
- 2 June 1961: Commander of the Order of the British Empire
- 1944: Efficiency Decoration (Second award in 1948)

=== Honorary Military Appointments ===
- 21 March 1963: Honorary Colonel, 463 (Durham Light Infantry) Light Air Defence Regiment RA (TA)

=== Arms ===
Coat of arms of Sir Robert Chapman, 2nd Baronet
| Crest Issuant from a wreath of oak Proper a dexter arm embowed vested Gules cuffed Argent grasping in the hand a harpoon also Proper. Escutcheon Per chevron Argent and Gules a crescent counterchanged in dexter chief a portcullis chained Sable over all in pale a sword point downwards Proper pommel and hilt Or. Motto Suaviter Sed Fortiter |

Honorary titles
| Preceded by Sir Thomas Wrightson, Bt | High Sheriff of Durham; 1960–1961 | Succeeded by Richard Boys-Stones, MC, TD |
Baronetage of England
| Preceded by Robert Chapman | Baronet (of Cleadon); 1963–1987 | Succeeded by David Robert Macgowan Chapman |
