= Eric Lewis (actor) =

British actor and singer (1855–1935)

Eric Lewis c. 1890

Frederic Lewis Tuffley (23 October 1855 – 1 April 1935), better known by his stage name, Eric Lewis, was an English comedian, actor and singer. In a career spanning five decades, he starred in numerous comedies and in a few musical comedy hits, but he is probably best remembered today as the understudy to George Grossmith in the Gilbert & Sullivan comic operas of the 1880s who left the D'Oyly Carte Opera Company just in time to give Henry Lytton his big break.

Lewis began performing in comic musical sketches in Brighton in the 1870s. He made his London performing debut in 1880 and joined the D'Oyly Carte Opera Company in 1882, where he understudied Grossmith until 1887. Lewis then performed in a number of very successful musical comedies and other comedies for the next decade but devoted himself to the non-musical comedy stage, performing mostly in contemporary comedies by Arthur Wing Pinero, Bernard Shaw, J. M. Barrie and R. C. Carton until 1925.

== Biography ==
Lewis was born in Northampton and raised in Brighton.

=== Early career and D'Oyly Carte years ===
Lewis made his first public appearance in comic musical sketches in local concert halls in Brighton in the late 1870s. He appeared at St. James's Hall in Brighton in October 1879 with Arthur Law and his wife Fanny Holland. By 1880, Lewis had begun presenting comic musical sketches at the Royal Polytechnic Institution and St. George's Hall, where he sometimes took the place of the comedian Corney Grain. In 1881, he made his London stage debut in Herbert Beerbohm Tree's company at the Haymarket Theatre as Pilate Pump in Blue and Buff. In 1882, he joined the touring Alice Barth Opera Company, playing a number of roles with them.

Lewis joined the D'Oyly Carte Opera Company in December 1882 as the understudy to George Grossmith in the principal comedian roles of the Gilbert and Sullivan operas. Grossmith was rarely ill or absent from the stage, however, and Lewis had very few chances to play the roles. His only substantial opportunity to play one of the principal comedian roles came when he played Ko-Ko in The Mikado during August and September 1886, during Grossmith's holiday.

Lewis was, however, given several roles in the short curtain raisers that often were performed together with the Gilbert and Sullivan operas. In these he played Mr. Wranglesbury in Mock Turtles from December 1882 to March 1883, Napoleon Fitz-Stubbs in A Private Wire from March 1883 to January 1884, receiving warm notices, the Counsel to the Plaintiff in Trial by Jury from October 1884 to March 1885 and Piscator in The Carp from February 1886 to January 1887. The Carp enjoyed an unusually long run for a curtain raiser. So long, according to Lewis's colleague Rutland Barrington, that at the end of the piece one night, when Lewis, who played the angler, shouted out his joyful "I've caught it!" a voice from the gallery responded, "About time, too!" In June 1885, Lewis played together with Barrington in an afternoon "musical dialogue," Mad to Act, with words by Barrington and music by Wilfred Bendall, at the Japanese Village in Knightsbridge.

Frustrated by his position as understudy to an actor who had hardly ever taken ill in four years, Lewis resigned from the D'Oyly Carte Opera Company in January 1887. On 29 January 1887, one week after the opening of the new opera, Ruddigore, Grossmith did fall ill, and Henry Lytton, a young actor who was in the right place at the right time, took Grossmith's role of Robin Oakapple until 18 February. Lytton went on to perform with the D'Oyly Carte Opera Company until 1934, including 25 years as the company's principal comedian.

=== Musicals and first comedies ===
Lewis as Mollentrave, 1905

Lewis was soon performing in the West End of London at the Royalty Theatre in April 1887 in Ivy, and in May in a comedy entitled A Tragedy. In June 1887, Lewis performed in a comedietta by Andrew Longmuir called Cleverly Managed. In July 1888, he starred in another comedietta, entitled Caught Out, by Florence Bright at St George's Hall In September of that year, he helped open the relocated New Court Theatre with a play by Sydney Grundy called Mamma, starring Mrs. John Wood and also featuring Arthur Cecil. In January 1889, he starred in The Begum's Diamonds by J. P. Hurst at the Avenue Theatre. In July of that year, he was back at the Court Theatre starring with Mrs. John Wood, Cecil and Weedon Grossmith in Aunt Jack, a farce by Ralph Lumley. The next year, he had his first big musical comedy success as the foppish Duke of Fayensburg in the successful operetta La Cigale, composed by Edmond Audran, at the Lyric Theatre. This ran from October 1890 to December 1891. The Duke was one of his finest roles, and the success of the piece owed much to his performance.

In 1892, he starred in A. G. Bagot's comedy The Widow at the Comedy Theatre. Later that year, he was well received in the role of the Duke in the early George Edwardes musical comedy In Town. Beginning in the next year, he starred as the ridiculed judge in the hit musical A Gaiety Girl. After the long run of that piece, in 1885 he was featured in another hit Edwardes musical, An Artist's Model. In 1896, he was in F. C. Burnand's Mrs Ponderbury at the Court Theatre with Mrs. John Wood, Charles Hawtrey and Brandon Thomas. Later in that year he appeared in A White Elephant, a farce by R. C. Carton at the Comedy Theatre and another musical, Monte Carlo, at the Avenue Theatre. In 1897, he received praise in another long-running musical role in A French Maid. The same year, during the run of A French Maid at Terry's Theatre, he played in a series of matinees consisting of short musicals for children by Basil Hood and Walter Slaughter. After this, Lewis devoted himself to the legitimate stage for nearly the remainder of his long career.

In 1899, Lewis was back at the Court theatre in another Carton comedy, Wheels within Wheels. Later that year, still at the Court Theatre, he was praised for his performance in A Royal Family, written by Captain Marshall. In the new century, Lewis continued to be as busy as ever. The Times described him as "well-nigh indispensable to light comedy for the role of the elderly gentleman of breeding, with a streak of affable eccentricity in his nature." The paper remembered Lewis as follows:

Only to think of Eric Lewis in an Eric Lewis part is to chuckle. His comfortable physique, his lovable mannerisms, his worried look, his affectation of aggrieved pomposity, his ludicrous vocal shades ranging from mellow nonchalance to shrill querulousness, above all, his wonderful rolling eyes – all these characteristics exuded unctuousness, and even in the recesses of memory provoke the thoughts to laughter.... His quaint personality was as familiar as it was welcome.

Lewis was praised for his performances at the Criterion Theatre in the revival of another Marshall play, His Excellency the Governor, and in Carton's Lady Huntworth's Experiment. In 1905, at St. James's Theatre, Lewis received more good notices as a cynical old busybody in the title role of Mollentrave on Women by Alfred Sutro. Looking back on this production almost 30 years later, The Times called Lewis's performance "perfect". The same year, he starred in George Bernard Shaw's Passion, Poison, and Petrifaction. Later that year at the Haymarket Theatre, he starred in On the Love Path by C. M. S. McLellan. The next year saw him in at the Duke of York's Theatre in All-Of-A-Sudden Peggy by Ernest Denny. and a revival of The Marriage of Kitty, both with Marie Tempest, with whom he appeared in many plays throughout his post-D'Oyly Carte career. At the Criterion later in 1906, he took the title role in W. Kingsley Tarpey's The Amateur Socialist. The Times observed that Lewis "has a recipe all his own for serving up folly with elegance; and he kept the audience in an almost continuous chuckle of delight." His last role that year was the fashionable Sir Ralph Bloomfield Bonington in The Doctor's Dilemma at the Royal Court Theatre. The Times later called this one of his best roles.

=== Later years ===
Lewis as Canton in The Clandestine Marriage, a role he played at charity matinées

In 1907, he played in Shaw's The Philanderer at the Court Theatre and in Sutro's The Wails of Jericho at the Garrick Theatre. The same year, at the St. James's, he starred in The 18th Century and Richard Brinsley Sheridan's The School for Scandal. That year he was invited to play in a royal command performance. In 1908, he continued to receive praise, starring in The Admirable Crichton at the Duke of York's Theatre and again as a judge in Lady Epping's Lawsuit at the Criterion. 1909 opened with Lewis and Tempest in Penelope by Somerset Maugham at the Comedy Theatre. The following year, he appeared in The Naked Truth by George Paston and W. B. Maxwell at Wyndham's Theatre. In 1911, he played in Lady Patricia by Rudolf Bessier at the Haymarket and Lady Windermere's Fan (together with Marion Terry) at the St. James's. The next year, Lewis appeared in Charles Brookfield's Dear Old Charlie at the Prince of Wales's Theatre and Mrs. Dane's Defence, by Henry Arthur Jones, at the New Theatre, In 1913, Lewis starred in H. V. Esmond's Eliza comes to Stay at the Criterion. Also, at the Duke of York's he played in J. M. Barrie's The Adored One and at the Royalty Theatre, C. B. Furnald's The Pursuit of Pamela. The following year, he starred in The Blue Mouse by Alexander Engel and Julian Horst at the Criterion. a revival of Eliza Comes to Stay at the Vaudeville Theatre and Sir Richard's Biography by Wilfred T. Coleby at the Criterion. By this part of his career, reviewers were calling the parts that he played "Lewisian".

In 1915, Lewis briefly returned to song and dance, supporting Gaby Deslys in a revue written for her by J. M. Barrie, Rosy Rapture at the Duke of York's. 1916 saw Lewis in Please Help Emily by H. M. Harwood at the Playhouse Theatre and The Hawk by Edward Knoblock at the Royalty Theatre. In 1917, he was featured in The Double Event by Sydney Blow and Douglas Hoare at The Queen's Theatre and H. V. Esmond's Salad Days at the London Pavilion. The next year, he played in Monica's Blue Boy by Arthur Wing Pinero at the New Theatre and The Man from Toronto by Douglas Murray at the Royalty. Even so, late in Lewis's career, The Times commented (in the midst of a very favourable review of the play), that Lewis "is always sure of himself, always sound, suave, brightly polished. [His episodes] are more entertaining than the main story." In 1919, he appeared in Kiddies by John L. Hobble at the Royalty.

In 1920, he was back in a musical comedy, The Little Whopper by George Grossmith, Jr. at the Shaftesbury Theatre. The Times wrote that "Lewis, sterling actor that he is, gave the impression last night that he had been playing in musical comedy all his life. He sang with the best, and he gave a perfect little study". Later that year, he played in Brown Sugar by Lady Lever at The Duke of York's. In 1921, he was seen in The Trump Card by Arthur Wimperis at the Strand Theatre. The following year, at the Aldwych Theatre, he was seen in Money Doesn't Matter by Gertrude Jennings and the farce Double-Or Quit! by Theophilus Charlton. In 1923, he played in another farce, Three's a Crowd, by Earl Derr Biggers at the Court and Frederick Lonsdale's Aren't We All? at the Globe Theatre. In 1924 Lewis appeared in Kate at the Kingsway Theatre, together with Nellie Briercliffe, and starred in The Other Mr. Gibbs, by Will Evans and Guy Reeves, at the Garrick.

Lewis continued to perform until 1925, appearing in the films Brown Sugar (1922) as the Earl of Knightsbridge, and as Sir Anthony Fenwick in The Happy Ending (1925), which starred Fay Compton and Jack Buchanan. He also wrote sketch comedies and short plays.

Lewis died in Margate, Kent, in 1935 at the age of 79.
