= Kitty Loftus =

English dancer, singer and actor-manager (1867–1927)

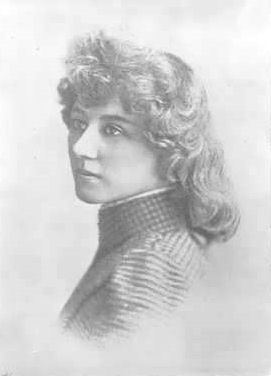
Kitty Loftus in 1893

Kitty Loftus (born Catherine Newman, 16 June 1867 – 17 March 1927) was an English dancer, singer and actor-manager. A soubrette of the 1890s and 1900s in comedies, burlesque, pantomime and musical plays, at the height of her career she performed with her Kitty Loftus Company. One critic praised her as "a tricky sprite and a fantastic elf." In her last years, she performed in variety in music halls and on tour.

== Early life and career ==
Catherine "Kitty" Newman was born in Whitecliffe in Gloucestershire in 1867, one of four singing and dancing daughters born to the touring actor George Frederick Newman and his actress wife Mary. She was the sister of the actresses Rosie Loftus Leyton (Rose Newman, 1877–1902), Olive Loftus Leyton (Ada Newman, 1870–1936) and Mabel Luxmore (Lillian Newman, born 1866). The tiny, blonde Kitty Loftus began a stage career as a child in plays and in pantomime before touring with the Milton-Rays.

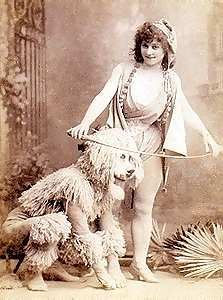
As Aladdin at the Theatre Royal, Brighton (1890)

She made her stage début as Puck in A Midsummer Night's Dream in 1879, quickly becoming a popular favourite in the British provinces playing leading burlesque roles in touring productions including Psyche in Venus (1890), Jack in Little Jack Sheppard, Siebel in Faust up to Date, and Cinderellen in Cinder Ellen up too Late. During Christmas 1890 she played the title role in the pantomime Aladdin at the Theatre Royal, Brighton. She became a regular in the annual pantomime at The Crystal Palace, appearing in December 1891 as Aladdin and playing Jack Daw in The Babes in the Wood and Bold Robin Hood (1892). Of her performance in the latter, the critic of The Sketch wrote of her:

This very talented and very charming actress ... once more … makes a distinctive mark and secures a bewitching triumph. Miss Kitty Loftus is, indeed, the fairy incarnation of the truest spirit of burlesque. She is a tricky sprite and a fantastic elf. She is an embodied lightness, instinct with the glad sparkle and effervescent gaiety of her peculiar branch of theatrical activity. She is daintily little, and yet exquisitely modelled, and her light foot dances as if dancing were the mere effusion of airy joy, expressed through merriment, but restrained by grace. ... Her voice is of no great compass or power; but she sings with so much expression as to bring out the full meaning of the words. ... Ambition may lurk beneath those careless curls, and the young lady, perhaps, secretly longs to ... turn from the dainty deliciousness of sparkling burlesque to gracious and coquettish comedy. ... Loftus is still so young that much may be hoped from the future career. ... Meanwhile, all may now make acquaintance, at the Crystal Palace, with her agile grace, her sportive lightness, and her quaint archness.

== Peak career and later years ==
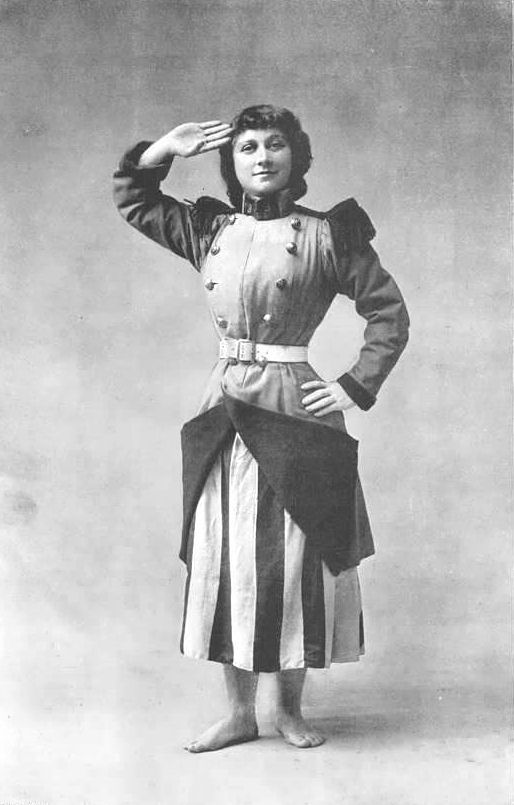
In the title role in Trilby at the Prince of Wales Theatre (1896)

In 1893 Loftus created the title role of Phyllis in the touring production of the most successful of the early variety musical comedies, The Lady Slavey, and in 1894 she was Eric in the pantomime Santa Claus at the Lyceum Theatre. Loftus appeared as Emma opposite Arthur Roberts in Gentleman Joe at the Prince of Wales Theatre (1895), Janet in Biarritz (1896) and Mrs. Bailey in The White Silk Dress (1896). In early 1896 she was playing the title role in Trilby at the Prince of Wales. She starred as Dora Selwyn in the supposedly Armenian musical The Yashmak (1897) and appeared in The Swineherd and the Emperor's New Clothes at Terry's Theatre (1898). She was Princess Petula in Her Royal Highness by Basil Hood and Walter Slaughter at the Vaudeville Theatre (1898), played the Maid-Servant in A Good Time at the Opera Comique (1899) and was a replacement player in the title role of The French Maid at the Vaudeville Theatre (1898).

She made her first appearance in America as Denise in the musical In Gay Paree at the New York Theatre (1899). Back in England, she played Harriet in Shock-Headed Peter at the Garrick Theatre (1900), Lucy in The Rivals at the Haymarket Theatre (1900), and the title role on tour in English Nell in 1901. She went to court to make a legal challenge against her old partner Arthur Roberts when he dropped her as co-star for his West End season of HMS Irresponsible (1900) after the pre-London tour in favour of Kate Cutler; on losing the case she played in Shakespeare with Frank Benson, and appeared as Maude Sportington in a revival of Morocco Bound (1901) and in the title role of the musical comedy Bébé (1901).

She produced and starred in the musical comedy Naughty Nancy at the Savoy Theatre (1902), was Margery Goring in her own production of the three-act comedy A Maid from School at Terry's Theatre (1904), and played the title role in her own production of the burlesque The Duchess of Silliecrankie (1904), again at Terry's Theatre. Loftus was in the pantomime at the London Pavilion from December 1905. In 1906 she made a tour of South Africa with George Robey.

The latter part of her career was spent in variety, with Loftus appearing in music halls such as the Holborn Empire in 1908, at the London Coliseum and touring the provinces. From 1910 to 1911 she was in The Critic at Her Majesty's Theatre.

== Personal life ==
She married the theatrical manager William Phillips Warren-Smith (1872–1927) in 1907 at St Peter's church, Thundersley, Essex. From at least 1911 to 1925 the couple were living in Marylebone in London.

Loftus died at her home in St John's Wood in London in 1927 having caught influenza some six weeks before. In her will she left £847 6s 10d to her husband.

== Sources ==
- Adams, William Davenport. A Dictionary of the Drama, vol. 1, Chatto & Windus, 1904
