= Louie Pounds =

English singer and actress (1872–1970)

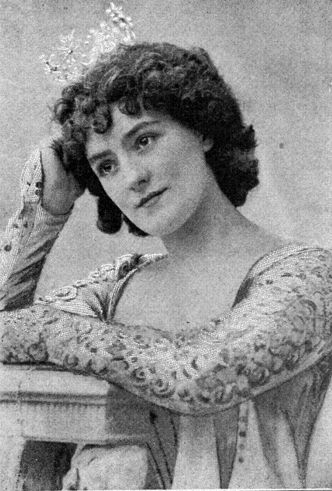
Photo in the Sketch, 24 April 1901, part of an advertisement for The Emerald Isle

Louisa Emma Amelia "Louie" Pounds (12 February 1872 – 6 September 1970) was an English singer and actress, known for her performances in musical comedies and in mezzo-soprano roles with the D'Oyly Carte Opera Company.

Originally intended for a secretarial career, Pounds joined the chorus of a George Edwardes show in 1890 and quickly achieved advancement to leading roles in burlesque and musical comedy. In 1899, she joined the D'Oyly Carte company, where she created several roles. She was the youngest of five siblings who appeared with D'Oyly Carte. Her older brother Courtice was a principal tenor with the company in the 1880s and '90s, and her three sisters, Lily, Nancy and Rosy, also appeared with the company. After four years with D'Oyly Carte, Pounds resumed her career in musical comedies and non-musical plays, later switching from juvenile to character parts. Her career continued into the 1930s.

== Life and career ==
=== Early days ===
Pounds was born in Brompton, Kensington, London. She originally studied to become a secretary, attending the Metropolitan School of Shorthand in Chancery Lane. In the early 1890s she suffered from the obsessional devotion of a man who had been at the shorthand school with her, and eventually he was imprisoned for threatening to kill her.

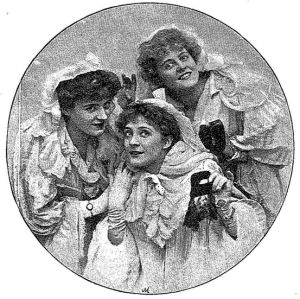
Pounds (left) with Kate Cutler and Marie Studholme in A Gaiety Girl, 1894

Pounds made her first professional stage appearance in 1890 as a chorus girl under the management of George Edwardes. After three months he gave her a small role in Joan of Arc at the Opera Comique in January 1891. The following year, she was in Blue-Eyed Susan, by F. Osmond Carr, as Daisy Meadows, in which she "had not much to do but wear smart costumes and look pretty, and so far succeeded". Later that year she played Lord Soho in the burlesque Cinder Ellen up too Late, with Edwardes's company, on tour and in London. In 1893 she appeared in Edwardes's musical, In Town, in London and on tour, and the following year she was one of the stars of the hit musical A Gaiety Girl. In 1895 she appeared with Marie Tempest, Leonora Braham and Sybil Grey in another Edwardes hit, An Artist's Model, in London, and appeared in the same show on a three-month tour in America. She next played in Gentleman Joe (The Hansom Cabby) on a provincial tour. In 1896–98 Pounds played Dorothy Travers in The French Maid in a pre-London tour and then in the West End. In 1897, at Terry's Theatre, she played in a series of special matinée performances of adaptations by Basil Hood and Walter Slaughter of Hans Andersen fairy stories. Her major West End role in 1898 was in the breeches role of Prince Rollo in Her Royal Highness.

=== D'Oyly Carte years ===
In 1899, while Pounds was performing in a revue, A Dream of Whitaker's Almanack, at the Crystal Palace, Sir Arthur Sullivan approached her about the forthcoming season at the Savoy Theatre. She joined the D'Oyly Carte Opera Company, creating the part of "Heart's Desire" in The Rose of Persia in 1899. She also appeared as the title character in the companion piece Pretty Polly (libretto by Basil Hood, music by François Cellier that played with The Rose of Persia and later with the first revival of Patience). Pounds was at the Coronet Theatre in the summer of 1900 in Hood's The Great Silence.

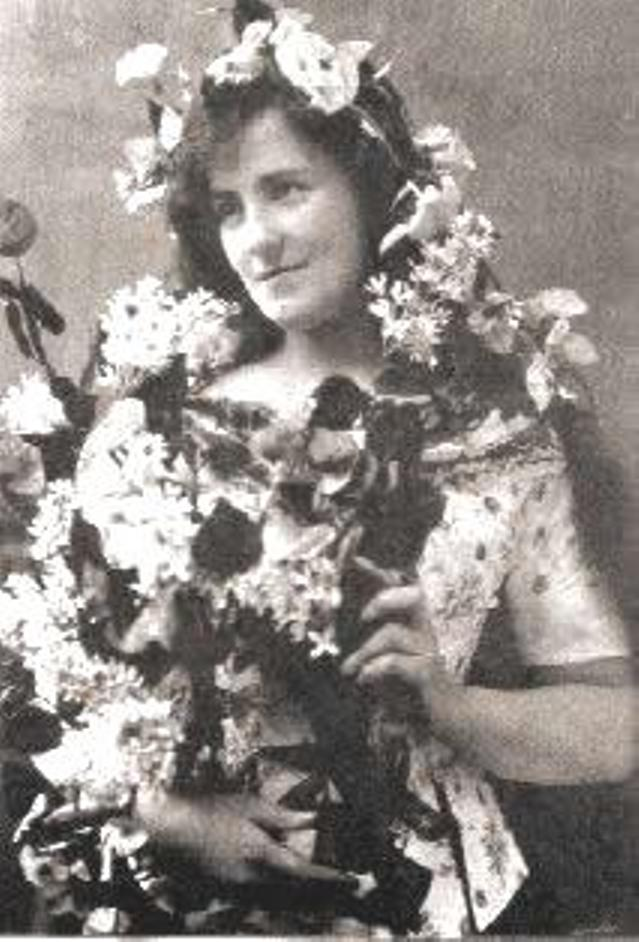
as Molly disguised as the "Fairy Clena" in The Emerald Isle

In 1901, also for D'Oyly Carte, she created the role of Molly O'Grady in The Emerald Isle. Her reviews were enthusiastic: "Miss Louie Pounds so far carries off the honours … that she is allotted the sweetest airs, and does justice to them with her dulcet contralto voice.… Pretty of face and comely of figure, she makes the most winsome of colleens, and 'tis a lucky … Mr. Henry Lytton to be the accepted sweetheart of such a purty lassie." Pounds next played Christina in another Savoy piece, Ib and Little Christina, after which, she played the title role in the first revival of Iolanthe (1901–1902). Next at the Savoy were two original works by Hood and Edward German. Pounds played "Jill-all-alone" in Merrie England (1902), and Joy Jellicoe in A Princess of Kensington (1903). Following the latter's London run and subsequent provincial tour, Pounds left the D'Oyly Carte company, which vacated the Savoy Theatre at that time.

=== Later career ===
Along with many of her colleagues from A Princess of Kensington, Pounds next appeared at the Adelphi Theatre in another hit Edwardian musical comedy, The Earl and the Girl (1903), and at the same theatre was the Princess in the pantomime Little Hans Andersen (1903). Over the next twenty years she appeared in numerous musicals and plays, including The Catch of the Season at the Vaudeville Theatre (1905). At the same theatre in 1906, Pounds starred with her brother Courtice in the hit musical The Belle of Mayfair. A review in The Daily Graphic praised both siblings. Another reviewer wrote, "Miss Louie Pounds has never been seen to better advantage. She looks a typical English girl, and her singing of 'And the weeping willow wept' is quite inimitably artistic".

In 1908, Pounds played Lydia in a revival of the Victorian hit, Dorothy, "a part which did not tax the qualities of this accomplished actress". In 1909, she played in The Dashing Little Duke (again with her brother), and then appeared on Broadway in The Dollar Princess in 1909–1910, following which she toured in South Africa. Popular theatre stars of the period endorsed products, and Pounds was often photographed for this purpose. By 1910 she had started to appear in character roles, such as the wife and mother in The Girl in the Train and, in 1913, Patty in J.M. Barrie's Quality Street, Madame Jollette in Toto in 1916, and another humorously manipulative wife in The Title in 1919. In 1920–21, she played the comic role of Alcolom in the first Australian production of Chu Chin Chow alongside the Ali Baba of C. H. Workman.

Pounds retired in 1923 but reappeared on stage in 1926. She played Widow Windeatt in the 1928 Alfred Hitchcock film The Farmer's Wife. In 1937 she toured as Mrs Bennett with Angela Baddeley and Glen Byam Shaw in a stage adaptation of Pride and Prejudice.

Pounds wrote an article, "Memories of an Earlier Iolanthe", that appeared in the March 1931 issue of The Gilbert & Sullivan Journal.

Pounds died in Southsea at the age of 98.
