= William Greet =

British theatre manager

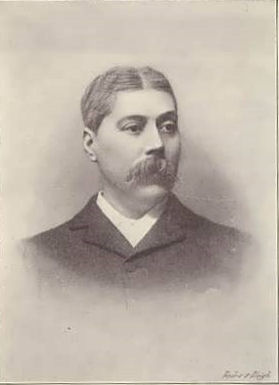
William Greet in The Sketch (1894)

William Greet (1851 – 25 April 1914) was a British theatre manager from the end of the 19th century and into the 20th century. Originally a business manager for other theatre licensees in the 1880s, he branched out as an independent manager in the 1890s and was associated with various London theatres, principally the Lyric, the Savoy and the Adelphi Theatres.

== Biography ==
Greet was the seventh child and eldest son of Captain Wiliam Greet R.N., commander of the recruiting ship H.M.S. Crocodile, and the former Sarah Vallance Barling. Greet's younger brother was the actor-manager Ben Greet. Greet was born on his father's ship, christened at St Peter ad Vincula at the Tower of London, and educated at the Royal Naval School, New Cross. He served as a Lieutenant of the Royal Marine Artillery from 1871 to 1877.

=== Career ===
Poster from The Emerald Isle

He worked first as a farmer and then began working in theatre management in the 1880s. Between 1884 and 1890, Greet was successively business manager at Toole's Theatre under its licensee, J. L. Toole, the Novelty Theatre (licensee, Willie Edouin), the Royalty Theatre (licensee, Kate Santley), the Prince of Wales's Theatre (licensee, Horace Sedger), and from 1890 to 1894 the Lyric Theatre, also for Sedger, with whom Greet's wife collaborated on a stage adaptation of the novel The Little Squire.

Greet became a producer and theatre manager in his own right in 1894, as licensee of the Avenue Theatre, starting successfully with the long-running Dandy Dick Whittington by George R. Sims and Ivan Caryll, The Lady Slavey (1894) and a popular comedy by F. C. Burnand, Mrs Ponderbury's Past (later billed as Mrs Ponderbury), directed by and starring Charles Hawtrey. In 1896, Greet gave up the licence at the Avenue and moved to the Lyric, where he presented the long-running The Sign of the Cross by Wilson Barrett, also producing an American tour of the play. He followed that success with another, Dandy Dan the Lifeguardsman by Basil Hood and Walter Slaughter, starring Arthur Roberts and W. H. Denny. Greet sat on the Board of Directors of The Lyceum Theatre Ltd. from 1899 until 1902.

In 1901, Greet leased the Savoy Theatre from Helen Carte, the widow of Richard D'Oyly Carte. He then managed the D'Oyly Carte Opera Company's revival of Iolanthe at the Savoy and its production of several new comic operas including The Emerald Isle, Merrie England (1902) and A Princess of Kensington (1903), both at the Savoy and on tour. At the same time, he also leased the Lyric Theatre in London, producing Mice and Men in 1902, The Light that Failed in 1903 and the musical comedies The Medal and the Maid (1903), and The Duchess of Dantzic (1904). He also leased the Comedy Theatre in London, where he produced the hit musicals Monsieur Beaucaire and Morocco Bound, both in 1902.

Greet continued to produce musical comedies and operettas, many of them very successful, including The Earl and the Girl at the Adelphi Theatre (1903), The Talk of the Town (1905, Lyric Theatre), Blue Moon (1905, Lyric), The Sign of the Cross (Terriss Theatre), Alice in Wonderland (1908), A White Man (1908, Lyric), Little Hans Andersen (1909, by Basil Hood), The Fires of Fate (1909, Lyric), The Rivals (1910, Lyric), The Chocolate Soldier (1910, Lyric), Baby Mine (1911, Vaudeville Theatre), Nightbirds (1911, Lyric), and The Girl in the Taxi (1912, Lyric).

Greet died in Bournemouth at the age of 62 and was buried at Shillingford.
