= Helen Carte =

Scottish opera company manager (1852–1913)

Helen Carte

Helen Carte Boulter (born Susan Helen Couper Black; 12 May 1852 – 5 May 1913), also known as Helen Lenoir, was a Scottish businesswoman known for her diplomatic skills and grasp of detail. Beginning as his secretary, and later marrying, impresario and hotelier Richard D'Oyly Carte, she is best remembered for her stewardship of the D'Oyly Carte Opera Company and Savoy Hotel from the end of the 19th century into the early 20th century.

Born in Wigtown, Scotland, she attended the University of London from 1871 to 1874 and pursued brief teaching and acting careers. In 1877 she obtained employment with Richard D'Oyly Carte and became his assistant and, later, business manager. She helped to produce the Gilbert and Sullivan and other Savoy Operas, beginning with The Sorcerer in 1877 and helped Carte with all his business interests. One of her principal assignments was to superintend arrangements for American productions and tours of the Gilbert and Sullivan operas.

She married Richard in 1888. During the 1890s, with her husband's health declining, Helen assumed increasing responsibility for the businesses, taking full control upon his death in 1901. She remarried in 1902 and continued to own the opera company and run most of the Carte business interests until her death. Although the D'Oyly Carte Opera Company's operations decreased after Richard's death, Helen staged successful repertory seasons in London from 1906 to 1909, establishing that the Gilbert and Sullivan operas could continue to be revived profitably; the company continued to operate continuously until 1982.

By the time of her death in 1913, the opera company had become a repertory touring company. Helen engaged J. M. Gordon to preserve the company's unique style. In her will, she left the Savoy Theatre, the hotel business and the opera company to her stepson, Rupert D'Oyly Carte.

== Life and career ==
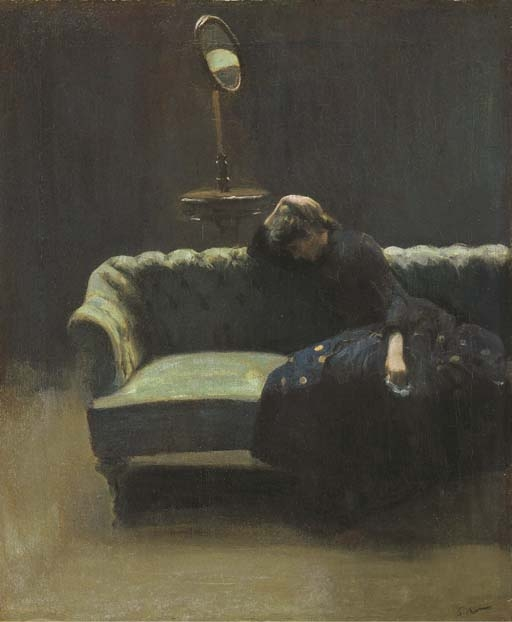
Painting of Helen Carte by Walter Richard Sickert, c. 1885: The Acting Manager

=== Early years ===
Susan Helen Couper Black was born in Wigtown, Scotland, the second of four children of George Couper Black (1819–1863), procurator fiscal and banker, and his second wife, Ellen, née Barham (1822–1902). One of her brothers, John McConnell Black, became a well-known botanist. Her grandfather, Robert Couper, M.D., was a Scottish physician and poet, and her great-uncle was George Couper, 1st Baronet, an army officer for whom the Couper baronetcy was created.

From 1871 to 1874, registered as Helen Susan Black, she attended the University of London and was a gifted student, passing the examinations for Special Certificates in mathematics and in logic and moral philosophy (the university did not award degrees to women until 1878). She also spoke several languages. After her studies, she supported herself by coaching students for examinations. She contemplated an acting career and took lessons in elocution, dancing and singing. Her first engagement was a two-month spell as a chorister and small part player in the pantomime at the Theatre Royal, Dublin in the 1876 Christmas season. She adopted the stage name Helen Lenoir, which, she later explained, had been the surname of her French ancestors until they anglicised it to "Black" upon settling in Scotland in the 18th century.

In February 1877 she travelled to London to audition for Richard D'Oyly Carte, who was setting up a provincial tour of a French farce adapted under the title The Great Divorce Case. He engaged her for a small role, which she played in Liverpool and other cities, before leaving the tour after a few weeks and obtaining work in Carte's entertainment agency offices in London. She was soon assisting Carte with the production of Gilbert and Sullivan's The Sorcerer.

=== The woman behind the man ===
From the time that she became a secretary in Richard's agency in June 1877, Helen was intensely involved in his business affairs and had a grasp of detail and organisational and diplomacy skills that surpassed even Carte's. Frank Desprez, the editor of The Era, wrote, "Her character exactly compensated for the deficiencies in his." She eventually became the business manager of the company and was later responsible for the Savoy Hotel, into which she introduced the new hydraulic passenger lifts. One of Helen's early tasks was to produce the British copyright performance of The Pirates of Penzance in Paignton. She made seventeen visits to America to promote Carte's interests, superintending arrangements for American productions and tours of the Gilbert and Sullivan operas and American lecture tours of artistes managed by Carte, as well as supervising many of Carte's British touring companies. She also assisted in arranging American lecture tours for Oscar Wilde, Matthew Arnold and others. Helen, more than anyone else, was able to smooth out the differences between W. S. Gilbert and Arthur Sullivan, in the 1880s, to ensure that the two produced more operas together. She also tactfully and sympathetically dealt with the personal and professional problems of the actors in the D'Oyly Carte Opera Company casts. Desprez wrote in her obituary, "She never took advantage of anybody; but I never heard of her letting anybody take advantage of her."

Helen Carte, c. 1885, from The Sketch, 1901

In 1886, Carte raised Helen's salary to £1,000 a year plus a 10% commission on the net profits of all business at his theatres. According to historian Jane Stedman, "When she demurred, he wrote, 'You know very well, and so do all those who know anything about my affairs, that I could not have done the business at all, at any rate on nothing like the same scale, without you'". Carte's first wife had died in 1885, and Helen married Richard on 12 April 1888 in the Savoy Chapel, with Sullivan acting as Carte's best man.

The couple's London home included the first private lift. James McNeill Whistler, a client of Carte's agency and friend of the Cartes, made an etching of Helen in 1887 or 1888, "Miss Lenoir", and later helped to decorate the Cartes' home. Helen Carte was sometimes referred to as "Helen D'Oyly Carte" or "Mrs. D'Oyly Carte", though D'Oyly was a given name, not a surname. Throughout the 1890s, Richard's health was declining, and Helen assumed more and more of the responsibilities for the opera company and other family businesses. In his 1922 memoir, Henry Lytton said of Carte:

She was a born business woman with an outstanding gift for organisation. No financial statement was too intricate for her, and no contract too abstruse. Once, when I had to put one of her letters to me before my legal adviser ... he declared firmly 'this letter must have been written by a solicitor.' He would not admit that any woman could draw up a document so cleverly guarded with qualifications. Mrs. Carte, besides her natural business talent, had fine artistic taste and was a sound judge, too, of the capabilities of those who came to the theatre in search of engagements.

In 1894, Carte engaged his son Rupert D'Oyly Carte as an assistant. Rupert's older brother, Lucas (1872–1907), a barrister, was not involved in the family businesses and died of tuberculosis at the age of 34. With no new Gilbert and Sullivan shows written after 1896, the Savoy Theatre put on a number of other shows for comparatively short runs, including several of Sullivan's less successful operas. Young Rupert assisted Helen and Gilbert with the first revival of The Yeomen of the Guard at the Savoy in May 1897. In 1899, the theatre finally had a new success in Sullivan and Basil Hood's The Rose of Persia, which ran for 213 performances.

=== After Carte's death ===
Carte with Rutland Barrington, c. 1908

Richard died in 1901 leaving the theatre, opera company and hotel business to Helen, who assumed full control of the family businesses. She leased the Savoy Theatre to William Greet in 1901, who managed the D'Oyly Carte Opera Company's revival at the Savoy of Iolanthe and productions of several new comic operas including The Emerald Isle (1901; Sullivan and Edward German, with a libretto by Hood), Merrie England (1902) and A Princess of Kensington (1903; both by German and Hood).

The last of these ran for four months in early 1903 and then toured. When A Princess closed at the Savoy, Greet terminated his lease, and Helen leased the theatre to other managements until 8 December 1906. She had married Stanley Boulter, a barrister, in 1902, but she continued to use the surname Carte in her business dealings. Boulter assisted her in the Savoy businesses. She was a founder member of the Society of West End Theatre Managers, along with Frank Curzon, George Edwardes, Arthur Bourchier and sixteen others.

Her stepson Rupert took over his late father's role as Chairman of the Savoy Hotel in 1903, which Helen continued to own. The years between 1901 and 1906 saw a decline in the fortunes of the opera company. The number of D'Oyly Carte repertory companies touring the provinces gradually declined until there was only one left, visiting often small centres of population. After the company visited South Africa in 1905, more than half a year elapsed with no professional productions of G&S in the British Isles. During this period, Helen and Rupert focused their attention on the hotel side of the family interests, which were very profitable.

In late 1906 Helen produced a repertory season at the Savoy Theatre, leasing the Savoy to herself. She persuaded the recently knighted Gilbert, now 71, to stage direct the productions in repertory, and once again she had to exercise the greatest tact, as Gilbert sometimes had difficulty accepting that he was no longer an equal partner and was taking no financial risk. He was displeased that he had not been consulted about the casting of the productions. The season, and the following one, were tremendous successes, revitalising the company. Contemporary accounts describe Carte taking three curtain calls with Gilbert on the opening night of the 1906 revival of The Yeomen of the Guard.

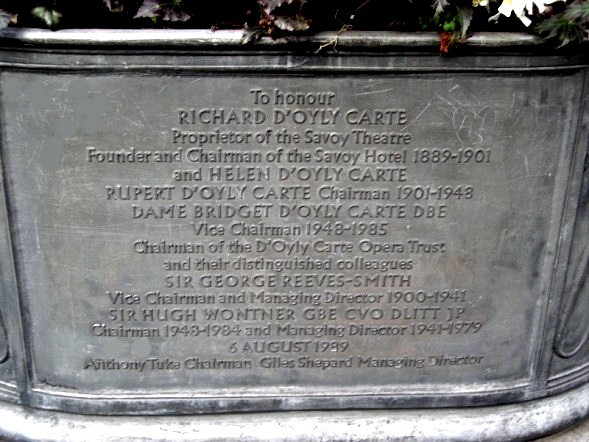
Planter in the Victoria Embankment Gardens behind the Savoy Hotel

After the repertory seasons in 1906–07 and 1908–09 the company did not perform in London again until 1919, only touring throughout Britain during that time. Carte wrote in 1911 that her health made it impossible for her to produce any more revivals at the Savoy. In March 1909 Charles H. Workman took over the management of the Savoy Theatre from the now frail Carte. She continued to manage the rest of the family businesses with the assistance of Rupert. In 1910 she engaged J. M. Gordon, who had been a member of the company under Gilbert's direction, as stage manager. She implored Gordon to make sure that the operas were performed as the authors had intended. Both Gordon and George Edwardes spoke warmly of Carte.

In 1912 King George V conferred on Carte the Order of the League of Mercy, in recognition of her charitable generosity. After another illness, lasting several months, she died of a cerebral haemorrhage complicated by acute bronchitis on 5 May 1913, at age 60. A private funeral was held at Golders Green crematorium. In her will, she left the Savoy Theatre, the opera company and the hotel business to Rupert, bequests of £5,000 to each of her two brothers and smaller bequests to a number of friends and colleagues. She left the considerable residuary estate to her husband. The D'Oyly Carte Opera Company continued to operate continuously until 1982.

== Portrayals in film and television ==
Carte has been portrayed in the films The Story of Gilbert and Sullivan (1953) by Eileen Herlie and in Topsy-Turvy (1999) by Wendy Nottingham. She was portrayed by Mary McKenzie in the British 1961 3-part TV series, Gilbert & Sullivan: The Immortal Jesters.
