= Louis De Lange =

American playwright, actor

- Born: 1856; Philadelphia, Pennsylvania, U.S.
- Died: March 13, 1906; New York City, U.S.
- Education: University of Pennsylvania (DDS)

Louis De Lange, also known as Louis De Lange Moss (sometimes erroneously spelled Delange or DeLange or de Lange) (1856 – March 13, 1906) was an American playwright, actor, and theatrical manager. As a stage actor he primarily appeared in light operas and musicals; notably portraying Sir Joseph Porter in the original production of John Philip Sousa's pirated version of Gilbert and Sullivan's H.M.S. Pinafore in Philadelphia, on Broadway and on tour in 1879. As a dramatist he mainly wrote the books for musicals; often in collaboration with writer Edgar Smith on projects created for the comedy duo Lew Fields and Joe Weber. De Lange also worked as Fields and Weber's manager for their national tours. His wife was the Broadway actress Selma Mantell who appeared in the Ziegfeld Follies among other Broadway shows. Their son was the bandleader and lyricist Eddie DeLange.

== Life and career ==
Born and raised in Philadelphia, Louis De Lange was the adopted son of Isaac M. Moss; a wealthy stationer who was a prominent member of Philadelphia's Jewish community. In 1872 he entered the University of Pennsylvania to study to be a dentist; graduating with a Doctor of Dental Surgery degree in 1876. Following graduation, he established a dental practice at 46 Farnsworth Ave in Philadelphia which was active as late as 1883. Against the wishes of his adopted father he abandoned his career as a dentist and pursued a career as an actor and playwright. His brother, Alexander De Lange, was a comedian who performed under the name Alexander Clark.

As an actor, De Lange had an early and particular triumph on Broadway at Daly's Theatre in 1879 as The Right Honorable Sir Joseph Porter, K.C.B. in Gilbert and Sullivan's H.M.S. Pinafore; a production which had begun its life at Philadelphia's Horticultural Hall and then moved to that city's Walnut Street Theatre before coming to New York and touring throughout 1879. This was a pirated production of Pinafore that was led by John Philip Sousa and used Sousa's orchestrations. After this he toured the United States as a member of various light opera companies in the 1880s and 1890s; including those of Charles Pyke (the husband of Alice Nielsen) and Rudolph Aronson. In 1882 he performed in productions of Patience, Pinafore, and Claude Duval at the Grand Opera House in Chicago.

In 1885 De Lange returned to Broadway in a production of Orpheus and Eurydice at the Fifth Avenue Theatre. He also starred as Ralli Carr in Walter Slaughter and Basil Hood's musical Gentleman Joe at the Bijou Theatre in 1896, and as Paidagogus in J. Cheever Goodwin's Pippins at the Broadway Theatre in 1890. In 1901 he was committed to the Columbia Theatre in Boston where he starred in productions of The Mikado and Boccaccio.

De Lange authored several plays; many of which were staged on Broadway. Several of his plays were musicals for which he wrote the books in collaboration with other writers and composers; most especially Edgar Smith on projects created for the comedy duo Lew Fields and Joe Weber. He was also the manager for many of the national touring productions starring Fields and Weber. His first significant play, The Globe Trotter, premiered in Philadelphia in May 1894. His plays that appeared on Broadway include When the Cat's Away (1896, Bijou Theatre; later retitled The Gay Mr. Lightfoot), Pousse Cafe (1897, Imperial Music Hall), The Little Host (1898, Herald Square Theatre), Mother Goose (1899, Fourteenth Street Theatre), and Sweet Anne Page (1900, Manhattan Theatre).

At the age of fifty, Louis De Lange was found dead in his room at the Mock's Hotel in New York City on March 13, 1906. His throat had been cut. At the time of his published obituary in The New York Times the police could not determine whether it was a murder or a suicide; although a suspect was in custody and his hotel room had been robbed. He was married to the actress Selma Mantell who starred in the Ziegfeld Follies among other shows. The couple had one son, the bandleader and lyricist Eddie DeLange, who was two years old at the time of Louis De Lange's death.

== Partial list of works ==
- High Tide, a musical comedy in three acts by Louis De Lange and F. P. Weadon; premiered April 7, 1889 at the Newmarket Theatre in Saint Paul, Minnesota
- Once on a time, a comedy in four acts, copyrighted April 12, 1889
- The Globe Trotter, a farce in three acts by Louis De Lange, premiered May 1894, Philadelphia
- When the Cat's Away (later retitled The Gay Mr. Lightfoot), a farce in three acts by Louis De Lange and Lee Arthur, premiered September 1, 1896, Bijou Theatre
- Pousse Cafe, Or The Worst Born, a burlesque, libretto by Edgar Smith and Louis de Lange, music by John Stromberg premiered December 2, 1897, Imperial Music Hall
- The Wayhighman, a burlesque parody of Reginald De Koven's The Highwayman; book by Edgar Smith and Louis De Lange; music by John Stromberg; premiered January 27, 1898 at Broadway Music Hall
- The Little Host, musical play in two acts; book by Edgar Smith and Louis De Lange, music by Thomas Chilvers and W. T. Francis; premiered December 26, 1898 at the Herald Square Theatre
- Mother Goose, a musical comedy in three acts; libretto by Edgar Smith and Louis de Lange; music by Fred J. Eustis and Frederick Gagel; premiered at the Fourteenth Street Theatre, May 1, 1899
- Sweet Ann Page, a comic opera in three acts; libretto by Louis de Lange and Edgar Smith; music by W. H. Neidlinger; premiered December 3, 1900 at the Manhattan Theatre
- The Japskys, a musical; book by Louis De Lange; music by Billee Taylor; published 1904, Continental Music
- Lafitte, comic opera in three acts, libretto by Louis De Lange; music by Victor Herbert; this work was copyrighted December 8, 1924 after the deaths of Herbert and De Lange by Herbert's wife Therese Herbert

== Bibliography ==
- Alfred Theodore Andreas (1886). History of Chicago: From the fire of 1871 until 1885.
- Bordman, Gerald (2001). American Musical Theater: A Chronicle. Oxford University Press. ISBN 9780195130744.
- Brown, Thomas Allston (1903). A History of the New York Stage From the First Performance in 1732 to 1901, volume III. New York: Dodd, Mead & Company.
- Chapman, John; Sherwood, Garrison P., eds. (1955). The Best Plays of 1894–1899. Dodd, Mead & Co.
- Dietz, Dan (2021). The Complete Book of 1910s Broadway Musicals. Rowman & Littlefield Publishers. ISBN 9781538150283.
- Franceschina, John (2004). Harry B. Smith: Dean of American Librettists. Taylor & Francis. ISBN 9781135949082.
- Sheppard, William Anthony (2019). Extreme Exoticism: Japan in the American Musical Imagination. Oxford University Press. ISBN 9780190072704.
