= Wilfred Bendall =

English composer, pianist, conductor, arranger and teacher

Wilfred Ellington Bendall (22 April 1850 – 16 June 1920) was an English composer, pianist, conductor, arranger and teacher. After musical studies at the Royal Academy of Music in London and the Leipzig Conservatoire, he pursued a varied career, based mainly in London. He composed several operettas, and a quantity of choral music and song. His other musical activities included conducting in the theatre and concert hall, playing piano accompaniments for recitals, serving as secretary to the composer Arthur Sullivan, and holding a professorship at the Guildhall School of Music. He died in London, aged seventy.

== Life and career ==
Bendall was born at Watts' Terrace, Old Kent Road, London, on 22 April 1850. He was the second son and fifth of nine children of Robert Smith Bendall and his wife, Elizabeth Kay, née Holmes. He was the only member of the family to pursue a musical career. In London he studied at the Royal Academy of Music where his professors were Charles Lucas and Edouard Silas, and from January 1872 he spent two years at the Leipzig Conservatoire, where he was a student of Carl Reinecke, Oscar Paul and Salomon Jadassohn.

After returning to London Bendall performed as accompanist to singers and instrumentalists, played in chamber ensembles, and conducted. By 1887 he was conducting for Richard D'Oyly Carte, George Edwardes and other managements.

As a composer, Bendall wrote for the theatre, concert hall and domestic performance. His operetta Lover's Knots (words by Cunningham Bridgeman) was presented privately in November 1880, and publicly at the Opera Comique in 1882. The Observer commented that the music was "of a far higher stamp than that generally expended on such lever de rideau". Between those two productions, Bendall's vaudeville Quid Pro Quo (words by Bridgeman and Rutland Barrington) played as a curtain-raiser at the Opera Comique for Princess Toto by Frederic Clay and W. S. Gilbert. Another collaboration with Bridgeman, He Stoops to Win, a one-act operetta, was presented in 1891, with a cast including Decima Moore, Rosina Brandram and Courtice Pounds.

In 1892 Bendall's operetta Beef Tea (words by Harry Greenbank) was presented as the curtain-raiser to Lecocq's Le coeur et la main at the Lyric Theatre. For Arthur Bourchier's Christmas entertainments for children at the Garrick Theatre, Bendall collaborated with Frederick Rosse in a two-part musical medley, Little Black Sambo and Little White Barabara, to words by Barrington.

Bendall composed choral pieces including Parizadeh, given at St James's Hall in 1884, and The Legend of Bregenz (words by Adelaide Procter), a secular cantata. He began writing songs early in his career: his "The Sun has Arisen" was published in 1856. Two years later, reviewing his song "Awake! The Starry Midnight Hour", The Musical Standard praised "a melody which is at once excellent and pleasing" and predicted a fine future for the young composer. Later songs included "The Gondolier's Farewell" ("a graceful and effective barcarolle to some extremely pretty words by B. C. Stephenson", said The Times).

Bendall was Arthur Sullivan's friend, confidant, and (from 1894 to Sullivan's death in 1900) his secretary. After the end of Sullivan's long collaboration with Gilbert, Bendall introduced the composer to Basil Hood, who wrote the librettos for Sullivan's last two operas, The Rose of Persia (1899) and The Emerald Isle (produced in 1901 after the composer's death). Bendall was responsible for creating the vocal scores and piano reductions of Sullivan's later operas, The Grand Duke, The Chieftain and The Beauty Stone, as well as The Rose of Persia and The Emerald Isle. In his will, Sullivan left Bendall two manuscript scores of his music as well as a cash sum and other bequests.

At the same time as serving as Sullivan's secretary, Bendall held the post of professor of piano at the recently established Guildhall School of Music, from 1884 to 1904.

Bendall died at his home in Ebury Street, Belgravia, London on 16 June 1920, at the age of seventy.

== Notes and sources ==
=== Sources ===
- Ainger, Michael (2002). Gilbert and Sullivan, a Dual Biography. Oxford: Oxford University Press. ISBN 978-0-19-514769-8.
- Baker, Theodore (1900). A Biographical Dictionary of Musicians. New York: Schirmer. OCLC 732681555.
- Crisp, Frederick (1908). Visitation of England and Wales, Volume 15. London: Grove Park Press. OCLC 664423888.
- Saxe Wyndham, Henry (1926). Arthur Seymour Sullivan. London: Kegan Paul. OCLC 59440916.
- Young, Percy M. (1971). Sir Arthur Sullivan. London: J. M. Dent & Sons. ISBN 978-0-460-03934-5.
