= Regina Theatre (Saskatchewan) =

Coordinates: 50.4488°N 104.6094°W

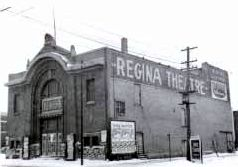
The Regina Theatre, 12th Avenue and Hamilton Street, previously on the site of the old Hudson's Bay department store, opened in 1910

The old town hall, on the northeast corner of Scarth Street and 11th Avenue in Regina, Saskatchewan, was converted to the Bijou Theatre in 1908. Hand-cranked silent movies were shown with piano accompaniment. Local amateurs and travelling road shows performed on its rickety, sloping stage. When the Bijou was hauled away in 1909, the Whitmore brothers, A.E. (Bert), George and Dr. Frank, along with Chief Justice J.T. Brown and James Balfour, built the splendid new Regina Theatre which opened February 7, 1910. With 870 seats, including eight boxes, it was able to accommodate the largest travelling vaudeville shows and featured stage plays and concerts.

On June 30, 1912 Boris Karloff was performing there when the Regina Cyclone hit the town at 5pm. This event and his presence were commemorated in 2012. In 1913 the Regina Operatic Society staged a production of "The Toreador" at the Regina Theatre, from which a full cast photo survives. In 1922 Freddy Rowan and Paul Bennet starred in a Regina Theatre operatic production of "Merrie England." In 1925 Freddy Rowan appeared there in "The Cingalee".

The Regina Theatre closed in 1929, following a fire. The building remained vacant until 1939 when it was torn down. The Hudson's Bay Company Department Store was built on this site in the late 1960s. The Bay moved to the Cornwall Centre in 2000.

The Regina Theatre even boasted Saskatchewan's first dimmer board, which made possible elaborate lighting effects. This theatre was the city's primary home for live performances presenting everything from drama to vaudeville.

== Gallery ==
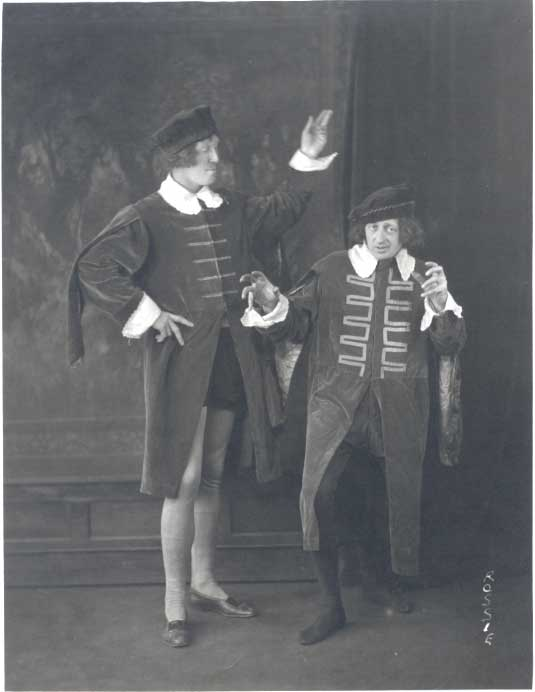

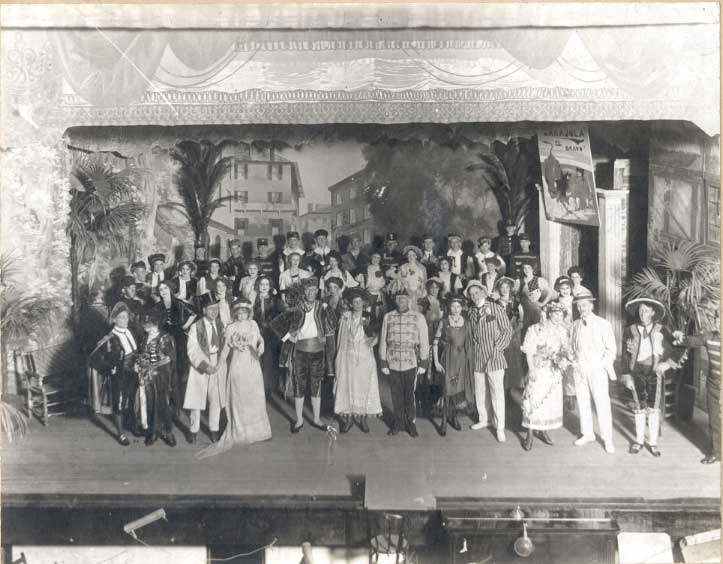
Regina Operatic Society cast "The Toreador" 1913

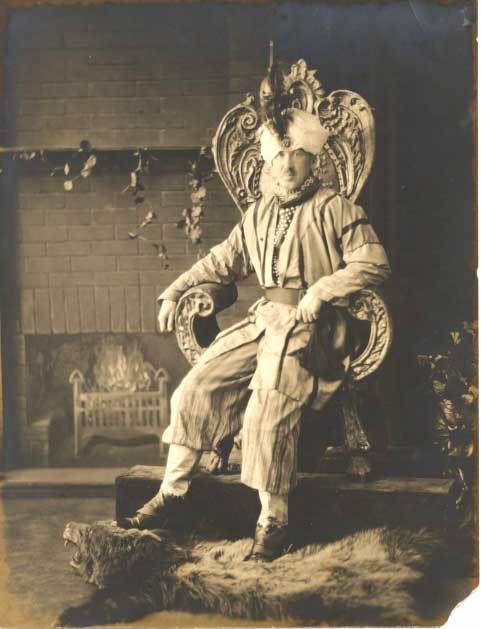
Freddy Rowan in "The Cingalee" 1925
