= The Yashmak =

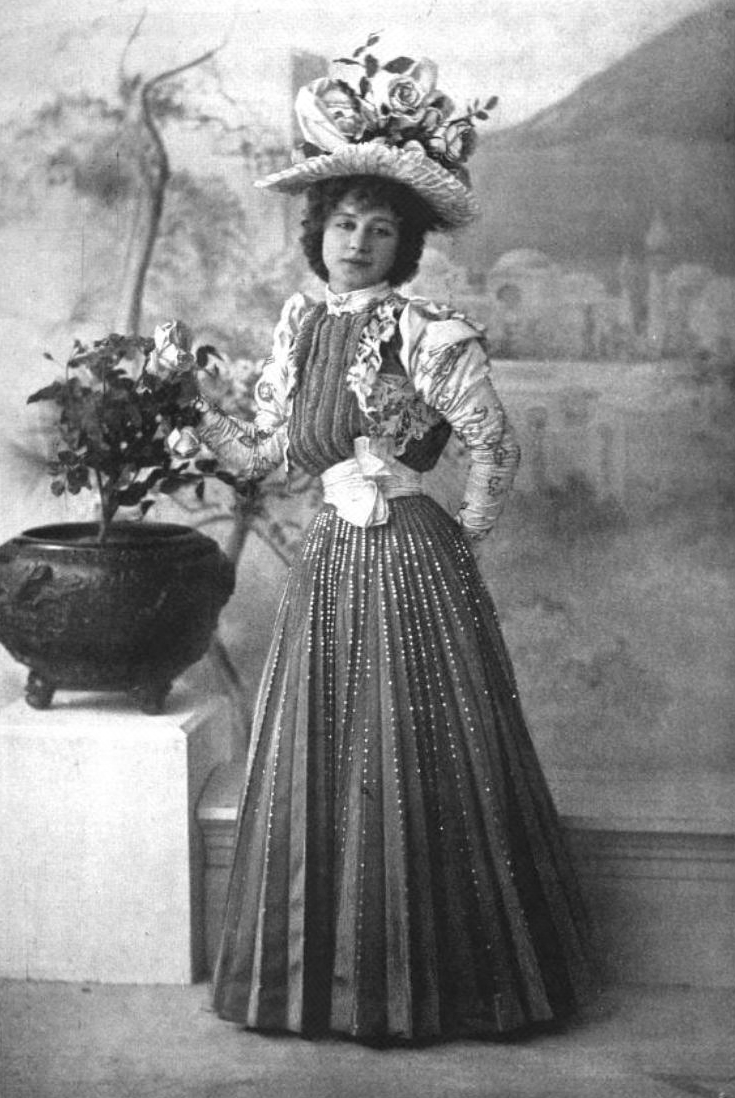
Kitty Loftus as Dora Selwyn

The Yashmak, A Story of the East is a musical play, with a libretto by Cecil Raleigh and Seymour Hicks, adapted from an Armenian operetta, Leblébidji Horhor, which had been a success in 1896 in Constantinople. The music was composed by Napoleon Lambelet (1864–1932), and additional songs were composed by Leslie Stuart and others. The Yashmak was first produced at the original Shaftesbury Theatre in London from 31 March 1897 to 31 July 1897, for a run of 121 performances. Scott Russell, a former leading D'Oyly Carte Opera Company tenor, left the Savoy Theatre to star in the production with Aileen D'Orme, who was later replaced by the French music hall singer Marguerite Cornille. Kitty Loftus played Dora Selwyn, while Topsy Sinden was principal dancer in the piece.

A yashmak is a double veil worn in Islamic countries. The first layer is drawn around the forehead and gathered up behind and on the head; the second, pinned on behind to the first, falls sufficiently in front to uncover the eyes.
