= Merrie England (opera) =

Comic opera by Edward German (premiered 1902)

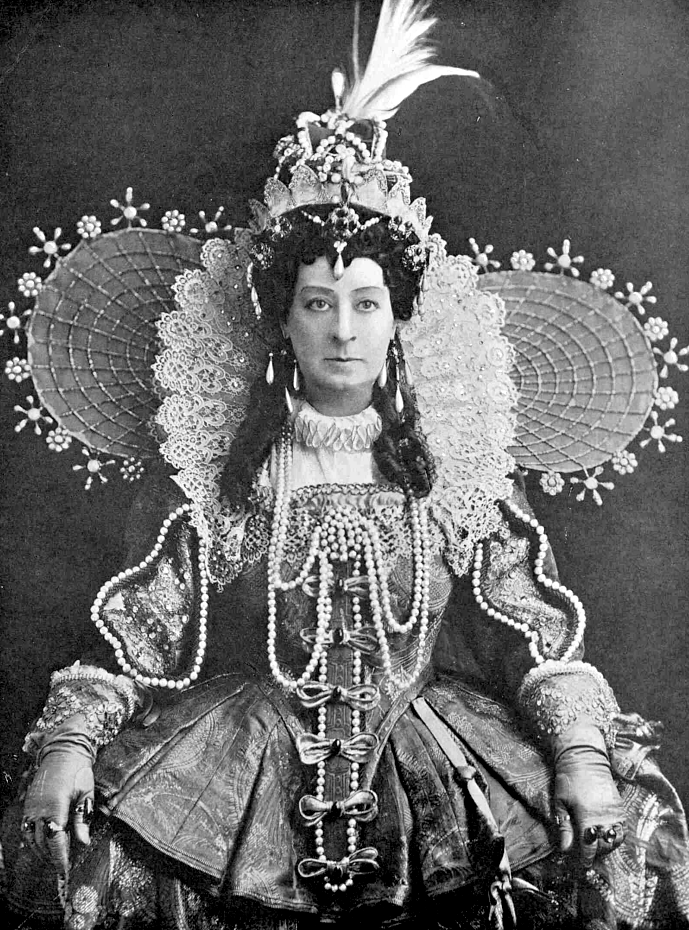
Rosina Brandram as Queen Elizabeth in the original production, 1902

Merrie England is an English comic opera in two acts by Edward German to a libretto by Basil Hood. The patriotic story concerns love and rivalries at the court of Queen Elizabeth I, when a love letter sent by Sir Walter Raleigh to one of Queen Elizabeth's ladies-in-waiting, Bessie Throckmorton, ends up in the hands of the Queen. Well-known songs from the opera include "O Peaceful England", "The Yeomen of England" and "Dan Cupid hath a Garden".

The piece played at the Savoy Theatre in London in 1902–1903. It has been revived many times, both professionally and by amateur operatic groups. There have been complete recordings of the score and several issues of recorded excerpts.

== Background and original production ==
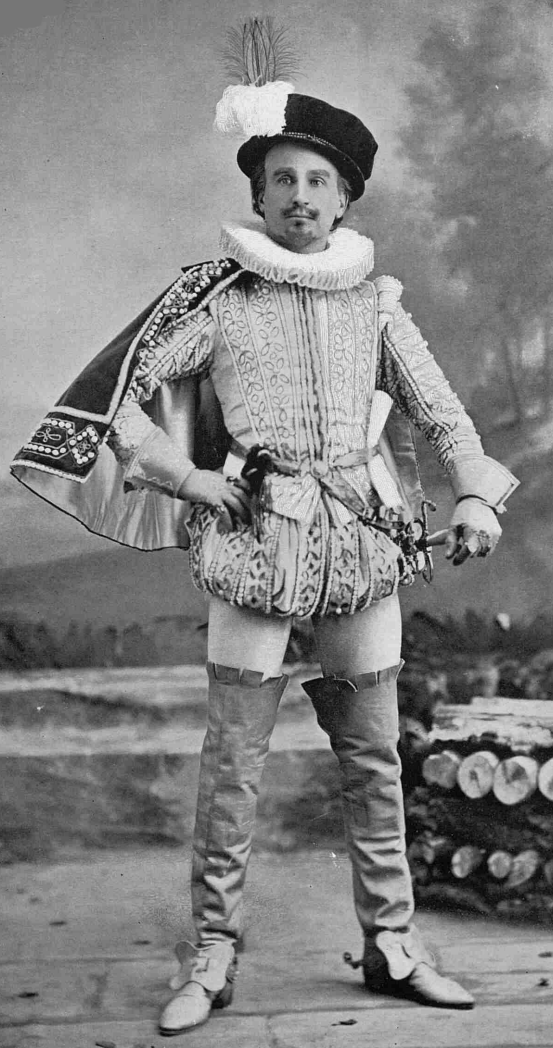
Henry Lytton as Essex

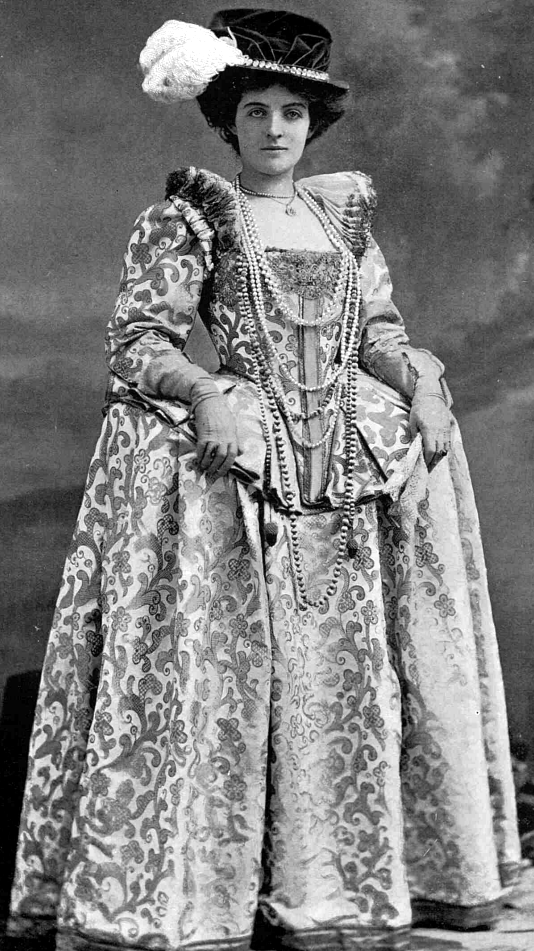
Agnes Fraser as Bessie

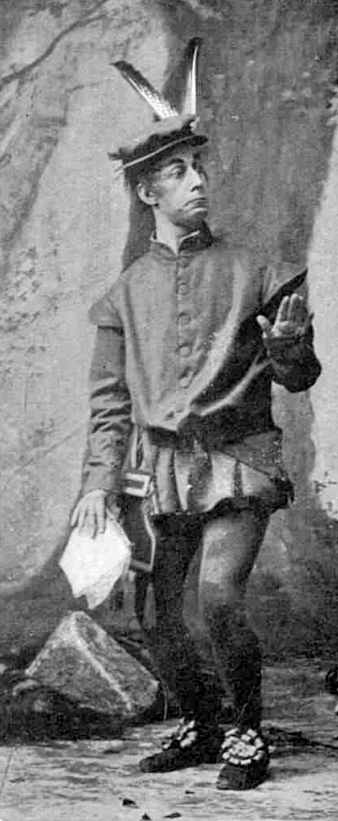
Walter Passmore as Wilkins

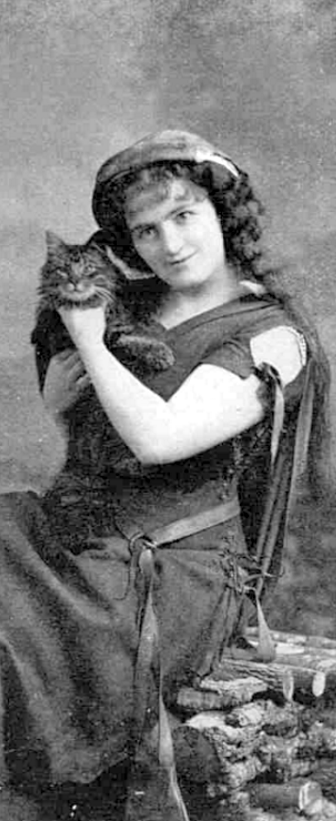
Louie Pounds as Jill

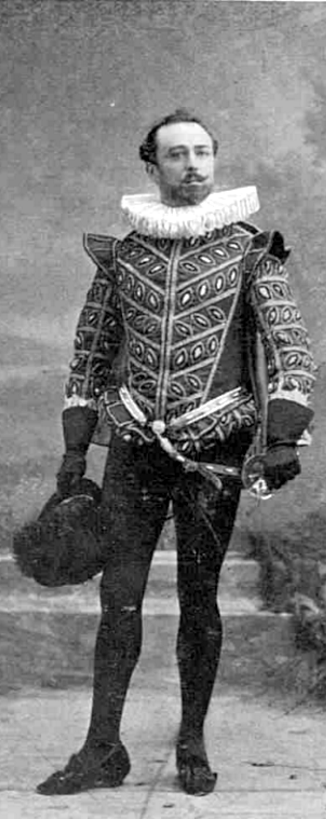
Robert Evett as Raleigh

Basil Hood's libretto makes heavy use of wordplay for comic (and dramatic) effect. For example, the homophones 'fore' and 'four' are used in a scene in the second act where it is explained that a dragon has "four legs, two of which are hind legs and two of which are fore legs" (compare this with the famous 'orphan'/'often' exchange in Act one of The Pirates of Penzance, by Gilbert and Sullivan).

The poem in Act One giving the A to Z of Romeo and Juliet is an example of Hood's writing, summarising the plot of Romeo and Juliet through use of the alphabet. The plot, a rustic, romanticised Tudor story, has been criticised for containing too many unimportant characters and for historical inaccuracy. It concerns love and rivalries at the court of Queen Elizabeth I, who is portrayed as jealous of Sir Walter Raleigh's affection for her lady-in-waiting, Bessie Throckmorton. This relationship is revealed to the Queen by the Earl of Essex, who transmits a love letter written by Raleigh to Bessie, which the Queen initially assumes was meant for herself. Ultimately, however, the Queen chooses Essex as her lover and forgives Bessie.

The music is an example of the style of English light opera made famous in the 1870s and 1880s by Gilbert and Sullivan. It features a prominent chorus and a range of principal numbers including ballads, patter songs, duets and quintets. German had gained a lot of practical knowledge about style and orchestration from completing Arthur Sullivan's score for The Emerald Isle, and he put this into practice in Merrie England, which was his own first large-scale work for the stage. German's score, evoking the colourful Tudor period, combines pomp and ceremony with ballads and romantic arias. It includes the well known song for the Queen "O Peaceful England" and "The Yeomen of England", which became a favourite and was performed at Queen Elizabeth II's Jubilee celebrations in 2002.

The opera opened at the Savoy Theatre in London on 2 April 1902, under the management of William Greet, and ran for 120 performances, closing on 30 July 1902. The piece then toured while the Kitty Loftus Company played at the Savoy. The production reopened at the Savoy on 24 November 1902 for 56 additional performances, ending on 17 January 1903. It starred Henry Lytton, Louie Pounds, Rosina Brandram, Robert Evett and Walter Passmore, among other regulars of the Savoy.

== Roles ==
Role	Voice type	Premiere Cast, (Conductor: Hamish MacCunn)
Sir Walter Raleigh	tenor	Robert Evett
The Earl of Essex	bass	Henry A. Lytton
Walter Wilkins, a player in Shakespeare's Company	baritone	Walter Passmore
Silas Simkins, another Player	baritone	Mark Kinghorne
Long Tom, Royal Forester	baritone	E. Torrence
Big Ben, Royal Forester	bass	R. Compton
The Queen's Fool		George Mudie, Jnr
A butcher	bass	Powis Pinder
A baker	tenor	J. Boddy
A tinker	baritone	Rudolph Lewis
A tailor	tenor	Robert Rous
A lord	baritone	Charles Childerstone
A soldier		Lewis Campion
First royal page		L. Emery
Second royal page		Ela Q. May
Bessie Throckmorton	soprano	Agnes Fraser
"Jill-All-Alone"	mezzo-soprano	Louie Pounds
Queen Elizabeth	contralto	Rosina Brandram
The May Queen	mezzo-soprano	Joan Keddie/Olive Rae
Marjory		Winifred Hart-Dyke
Kate	contralto	Alice Coleman
Lady-in-waiting		Rose Rosslyn
Chorus of lords, ladies, townsfolk, and soldiers

== Synopsis ==
Two versions of the plot exist: Hood's original from 1902 and a revised one by Dennis Arundell presented at Sadler's Wells in 1960. The opera is set in Windsor Town and makes frequent reference to mythology and folklore (Robin Hood, King Neptune, St. George and the Dragon and witchcraft).

=== Act One ===
During the May Day festival, the May Queen is crowned with "roses white and roses red ... the flowers of Merrie England". Her two guards are introduced – Long Tom and Big Ben – who are brothers identical in all but one thing. The "little difference between them" is that Big Ben (like the other men in Windsor) loves the May Queen, while Long Tom loves Jill (known as Jill-All-Alone). Jill is accused of being a witch by the jealous May Queen and is shunned by the townsfolk.

Bessie Throckmorton, one of Queen Elizabeth's ladies-in-waiting, and Sir Walter Raleigh are in love, but they must keep their love a secret as the Queen is also in love with Raleigh. Bessie tells of how she carelessly lost a love letter from Raleigh ("She lost the letter from her love"). She worries that the letter may have fallen into Queen Elizabeth's hands and thus reveal their secret love. The Earl of Essex (Raleigh's rival for the affection of the Queen) is handed the love letter (an acrostic on the name Bessie) by Jill-All-Alone and plans to use it to dispose of Raleigh. Walter Wilkins, a travelling actor, appears and argues that any play can be vastly improved by the addition of song ("if it's played on a big brass band") and claims that "that's where [he] and Shakespeare disagree."

Queen Elizabeth enters with much ceremony. Long Tom pleads for the Queen's protection of Jill-All-Alone from the townsfolk's persecution. The Queen asks Jill whether she believes she is a witch. Jill replies with the paradox that if she were a witch, she would know more than the townfolk. Therefore, she cannot be a witch, as she would know (as the townsfolk seem to) that she is a witch if she were. She declares that love will pass the Queen by. This insult angers the Queen, who joins with the villagers in condemning Jill as a witch, locking her away in Windsor Castle to be burned for witchcraft. Essex hands the Queen Raleigh's love letter, which she initially mistakes to be meant for her. Raleigh gallantly admits that the letter is in fact meant for Bessie Throckmorton. The Queen is so incensed that she banishes Raleigh from Court and imprisons Bessie in Windsor Castle.

=== Act Two ===
Jill has managed to escape with Bessie, using a secret passage out of the castle. The Queen asks an apothecary (her jester in disguise) to concoct a poison which she will administer to Bessie. Wilkins works at length on a stage version of the story of St. George and the Dragon, and the play is performed for the Queen and Essex. Unfortunately, they dislike the play.

Eventually the Queen is persuaded to allow Raleigh and Bessie to love each other freely, choosing Essex instead for herself after seeing an apparition of Herne the Hunter, who, according to legend, appears only when a sovereign contemplates a crime. The whole court takes part in a reenactment of Robin Hood's wedding to Maid Marian. Everyone takes roles closely related to their part in the opera; for example, Raleigh becomes Robin to Bessie's Marian.

== Musical numbers ==
- Introduction (Includes "Hey, Jolly Robin", the Rustic Dance, and the Jig)

=== Act I ===
- 1. "Sing A Down, A Down, A Down" (Chorus with May Queen and Butcher)
- 2. "We Are Two Proper Men" (Long Tom and Big Ben with Chorus)
- 3. "Oh! Where The Deer Do Lie" (Jill with Chorus)
- 4. "I Do Counsel That Your Playtime" (Wilkins with Chorus)
- 5. "That Every Jack Should Have A Jill" (Raleigh with Chorus)
- 6. "Love Is Meant To Make Us Glad" (May Queen, Kate, Raleigh, Wilkins, and Long Tom)
- 7. "She Had A Letter From Her Love" (Bessie)
- 8. "When True Love Hath Found A Man" (Raleigh and Bessie)
- 9. "When A Man Is A Lover" (Wilkins, Simkins, and Essex)
- 10. "Who Were The Yeomen of England, The Yeomen of England" (Essex with Chorus)
- 11. Entrance of Queen Elizabeth/"God Save Elizabeth" (Chorus)
- 12. "O Peaceful England" (Elizabeth with Chorus)
- 13. "King Neptune Sat on His Lonely Throne" (Wilkins with Chorus)
- 14. Finale (Ensemble)

=== Act II ===
- 15. "The Month o' May Has Come Today" (Chorus with Jill)
- 16. "In England, Merrie England" (Bessie, Jill, Big Ben, Long Tom)
- 17. "The Sun in the Heaven Is High" (Simkins, the Tailor, and the Butcher with Chorus)
- 18. "The Big Brass Band" (Wilkins and Simkins with Chorus)
- 19. "It Is the Merry Month of May" (Jill and Raleigh)
- 20. "The Queen o' May Is Crowned Today" (Chorus)
- 20a. Rustic Dance
- 21. "Dan Cupid Hath a Garden" (Raleigh)
- 22. "Two Merry Men a-Drinking" (Ensemble)
- 22a. Exit of Chorus
- 23. "O Who Shall Say That Love Is Cruel?" (Bessie)
- 24. "When Cupid First This Old World Trod" (Essex with Bessie, Jill, and Raleigh)
- 25. "Perhaps You Don't Imagine" (Wilkins)*
- 26. Masque of St. George and the Dragon (Egyptian Dance)
- 27. "Oh! Here's a To-Do to Die To-day" (Chorus with Wilkins as King)
- 28. Finale (Ensemble)

*Omitted by German during the first run, but printed in the vocal score.

== Revivals and recordings ==
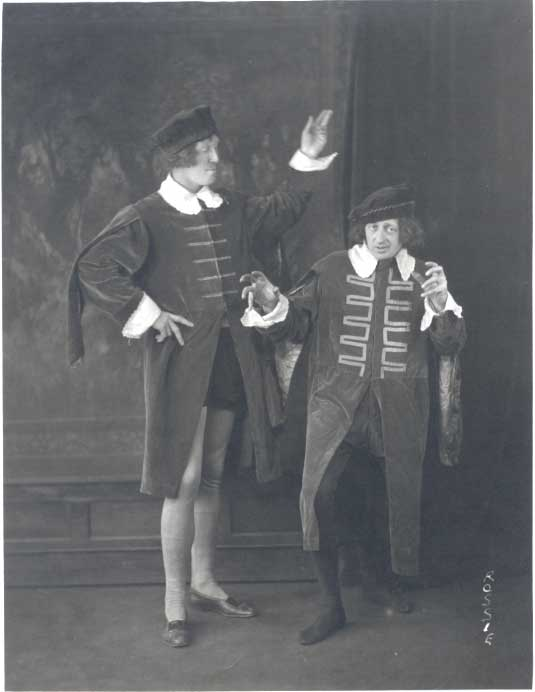
Freddy Rowan and Paul Bennet in "Merrie England", Regina Theatre, Saskatchewan (1922)

The opera became popular in Britain and was often performed by amateur groups in the decades following its premiere. A professional revival at Princes Theatre in 1934 was directed by William J. Wilson. It ran for 187 performances.

In Queen Elizabeth II's coronation year (1953), over five hundred amateur societies staged the piece. One production that year was presented as a coronation pageant outdoors at Luton Hoo house, with nearly 1,000 performers. The cast included Anne Ziegler as Bessie Throckmorton, Webster Booth as Walter Raleigh, Nancy Evans as Queen Elizabeth and Graham Clifford as Walter Wilkins.

Merrie England was recorded complete with its composer conducting, issued by His Master's Voice in 1918 on ten double-faced 12-inch 78 rpm records (20 sides). A recording of selections from the piece was made in 1931 on the Columbia label, with Clarence Raybould conducting "Under the Supervision" of the composer. Since then a few more complete recordings have been made, including on the His Master's Voice label in 1960, and individual songs from Merrie England have been recorded many times.

In recent decades, anniversaries such as that of the Spanish Armada in 1988 and the Queen's silver (1977), golden (2002) and diamond (2012) jubilee years have coincided with revivals. For example, Opera South produced a revival in 2012. Professional revivals in 2012, the year of the Queen's diamond jubilee, included a production by the Finborough Theatre in London.

== See also ==
- English rose (personal description) (an expression used in this opera)
- Merry England (an idealised, mythological conception of pastoral English life)
