= Eddie DeLange =

American bandleader and lyricist (1904–1949)

Background information
- Born: Edgar DeLange Moss; January 15, 1904; Long Island City, New York, U.S.
- Died: July 15, 1949 (aged 45) Los Angeles, California, U.S.
- Genres: Popular music
- Occupation: Lyricist

Eddie DeLange (né Edgar DeLange Moss; 15 January 1904 – 15 July 1949) was an American bandleader and lyricist. Famous artists who recorded some of DeLange's songs include Frank Sinatra, Ella Fitzgerald, Louis Armstrong, Nat King Cole, Duke Ellington, and Benny Goodman.

== Biography ==
DeLange was born in Long Island City, Queens, New York. His father was the playwright and actor Louis De Lange, and his mother was the actress Selma Mantell. His father tragically died when he was two years old, being found dead in a hotel room with his throat slit in what was possibly a murder or a suicide. His uncle Alexander De Lange, was a comedian who performed under the name Alexander Clark.

DeLange graduated from the University of Pennsylvania in 1926. He became a stunt man in twenty-four comedies produced by Universal Studios, often for Reginald Denny.

DeLange went back to New York City in 1932, earning a contract with Irving Mills. He had several hits in his first year, including "Moonglow."

He and composer Will Hudson (né Arthur Murray Hainer; 1908–1981) formed the Hudson-DeLange Orchestra in 1935. The Orchestra recorded many of their collaborative songs and did many road shows as well. Hudson and DeLange's partnership dissolved in 1938, but DeLange created a new band that played on several tours. He formed a new partnership with another composer, Jimmy Van Heusen, and together they produced a large number of hits, including "Darn That Dream". In 1942, De Lange co-wrote "A String of Pearls", a successful number for Glenn Miller.

Eddie DeLange died in Los Angeles, California, on 15 July 1949. He is interred at Glendale's Forest Lawn Memorial Park in an unmarked grave.

The National Academy of Popular Music's Songwriters Hall of Fame inducted him into their ranks in 1989.

== Family ==
DeLange, in 1943, married Marge Lohden (née Margaret Mary Lohden; 1918–1990). He moved with her to Los Angeles. They had two children, Stephanie Barr DeLange (born 1944) and Warren Edgar DeLange (born 1945). Eddie DeLange lived the rest of his life in Los Angeles, writing music for motion pictures.
