= The French Maid =

- Music: Walter Slaughter
- Book: Basil Hood
- Productions: 1896 West End

The French Maid is a musical comedy in two acts by Basil Hood, with music by Walter Slaughter, first produced at the Theatre Royal, Bath, England, under the management of Milton Bode on 4 April 1896. It then opened London's Terry's Theatre under the management of W. H. Griffiths beginning on 24 April 1897, but later transferred to the Vaudeville Theatre on 12 February 1898, running for a very successful total of 480 London performances. The piece starred Louie Pounds, Kate Cutler, Eric Lewis, Herbert Standing and Richard Green. There was a New York production in 1897.

The Times gave the piece a very favourable review at its London opening, saying that "a fresher, brighter piece has not been seen for many a day."

== Roles and original London cast ==
- Admiral Sir Hercules Hawser - H. O. Clarey
- General Sir Drummond Fife - Windham Guise
- Lt. Harry Fife - Richard Green
- Paul Lecuire - Herbert Standing
- Monsieur Camembert - Eric Lewis
- Maharajah of Punkapore - Percy Percival
- Charles Brown - Murray King
- Jack Brown - Joseph Wilson
- Alphonse - J. W. MacDonald
- Dorothy "Dolly" Travers - Louie Pounds
- Lady Hawser - Kate Talby
- Violet Tavers - Hilda Jeffries
- Madame Camembert - Lillie Pounds
- Suzette (the title role) - Kate Cutler

== Synopsis ==
Suzette, a French maid, has attracted several men, including a jealous gendarme, Paul Lecuire, and a waiter at the hotel where she works, Charles Brown. She must choose an escort to the upcoming bal-masqué. But things are complicated when several visitors to the hotel all call for the pretty maid, including an Indian Prince, his attaché, and Jack Brown, an English soldier who is the waiter's twin brother. In traditional French style, Suzette strings them all along, causing confusion in the lives of all concerned, including the aristocratic Admiral and Lady Hawser, their niece Dolly and her lover, Harry, who gets involved in situations full of jealousy, disguises and misunderstandings. Finally everything is revealed, and a chastened Suzette returns to her faithful gendarme.

== Musical numbers ==
Act I

- No. 1 - Opening Chorus – "Les femmes de chambre de cet Hôtel (Hôtel Anglais, Boulogne-sur-Mer)"
- No. 2 - Paul – "O pretty Suzette! Delightful Suzette, you're a bright little, slight little, sweet soubrette"
- No. 3 - Entrance of Sir Drummond & Maharajah – "I'm General Sir Drummond Fife, V.C., K.C.B."
- No. 4 - Sir Drummond & Prince with Chorus – "In eighteen hundred and ninety-four the Maharajah of Punkapore"
- No. 5 - Charles – "I'm only a waiter today, but the thought is most exhilarating"
- No. 6 - Suzette – "The sort of girl I am the gentlemen adore, although I am a Femme de Chambre"
- No. 7 - Dolly – "With my pencil and paper (my sketch-block or book) I frequently caper to some quiet nook"
- No. 8 - Dolly and Harry – "'Tis a law in Society's code that, whatever a damsel may do"
- No. 8a - Dolly – "There is a castle in the air, and Cupid holds the key"
- No. 10 - Jack and Chorus – "When quite a little chap, a-sitting on my mother's lap"
- No. 11 - Charles and Jack – "Some twins are very much alike, but we are not a bit"
- No. 12 - Jack and Chorus of Sailors – "The Admiral! Sir Hercules! Let every gal get off your knees"
- No. 13 - Admiral and Chorus – "I'm an Admiral of the Fleet, with character untarnish'd"
- No. 14 - Finale Act I – "She's going with the Admiral, the Admiral, the Admiral"

Act II

- No. 15 - Act II Opening Chorus – "Tho' Englishmen in England may take their pleasures sadly"
- No. 16 - Harry and Chorus – "When Elizabeth ruled England, in the gallant days of yore"
- No. 17 - Chorus of Girls and Sailors – "It's gone eight bells, or, leastways, sev'n-- Ashore that spells half past elev'n"
- No. 18 - Jack and Suzette – "You seem to say the proper way of making love's an art"
- No. 19 - Charles, Jack and Paul – "We're bound to follow Nature's laws, whatever we may do"
- No. 20 - Charles and Chorus – "As a child my father told me of the good that people reap"
- No. 21 - Paul and Gendarmes – "When danger sounds the alarm, the bold Gendarme must nerve his arm"
- No. 22 - Dolly and Harry – "No one I ever heard a sentence could compress"
- No. 23 - Admiral – "I'm as proud as a Plantagenet - you mightn't, p'raps, imagine it"
- No. 24 - Jack – "I ain't no famous 'ero of 'alf a hundred fights"
- No. 25 - Finale Act II - "Ah! Ah! Ah! that's a way we have in France"

Additional item

- Song with Chorus - soloist probably Jack – "I ain't the sort of man as you meets now and then"
