= The Emerald Isle =

Comic opera by Arthur Sullivan, Edward German and Basil Hood

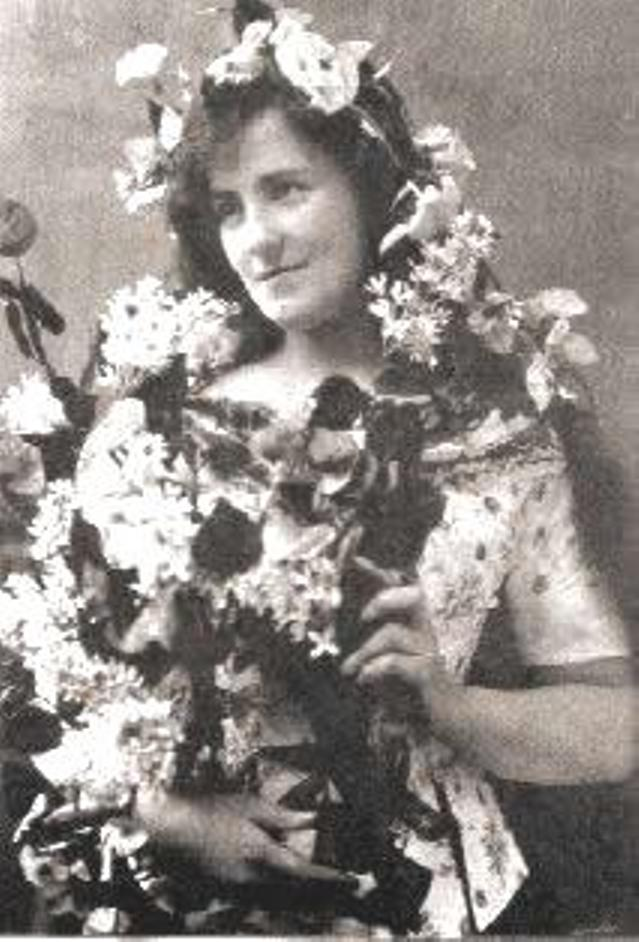
Louie Pounds: Molly in disguise as the "Fairy Clena"

The Emerald Isle; or, The Caves of Carrig-Cleena, is a two-act comic opera, with music by Arthur Sullivan and Edward German, and a libretto by Basil Hood. The plot concerns the efforts of an Irish patriot to resist the oppressive "re-education" programme of the English, which has robbed the Irish of their cultural heritage. A quirky "Professor of Elocution" who is hired by the English to continue this "re-education" of the Irish switches sides to help the Irish defend their culture. Romantic complications cause a confrontation between the Irish patriots and the superstitious English at the supposedly haunted caves of Carric-Cleena, and disguises are employed to hold the English off; but the professor ultimately comes up with a solution that works out happily for all.

The opera premiered at the Savoy Theatre on 27 April 1901, closing on 9 November 1901 after a run of 205 performances. The opening night cast included such Savoy regulars as Robert Evett, Walter Passmore, Henry Lytton, Rosina Brandram, Isabel Jay and Louie Pounds. The opera was given a production in New York City at the Herald Square Theatre for 50 performances, opening on 1 September 1902 and closing on 18 October 1902. The New York cast included Kate Condon as Molly and Jefferson De Angelis as Bunn. It was revived in 1935 at the Prince's Theatre (now the Shaftesbury Theatre) in London.

Modern professional productions of the work have been rare. The Prince Consort (an Edinburgh-based performing group) recorded the piece in Britain live in performance at the fringe of the Edinburgh Festival in 1982. The piece was also given in Edinburgh and then Torquay, England, in 1998. Another live recording (with dialogue) was made in 2001 as a centenary production at the Alexander Theatre of the Monash University, Clayton, Victoria, Australia, by the Gilbert and Sullivan Society of Victoria (now known as Gilbert & Sullivan Opera Victoria). Amateur groups in Britain produced the piece regularly through the 1920s and occasionally thereafter. A concert of the opera was performed by Valley Light Opera in Amherst, Massachusetts on 8 March 2008 with a narration written by Jonathan Strong. This was the first known U.S. performance of the opera with full orchestra since 1902.

== History ==
For much of the 1890s, impresario Richard D'Oyly Carte and his wife Helen Carte had struggled to find successful shows to fill the Savoy. They finally found a winning formula in The Rose of Persia by Arthur Sullivan and Basil Hood in 1899, and the two men quickly agreed to collaborate again on a new comic opera, The Emerald Isle. However, in mid-1900, Sullivan put aside his work on the opera, travelling to Germany and then focusing on a commission to compose what became his "Te Deum Laudamus – A Thanksgiving for Victory", celebrating the coming end of the Second Boer War. He increasingly struggled with ill health and died on 22 November 1900. At his death, Sullivan had finished two musical numbers from The Emerald Isle in their entirety, leaving behind sketches of at least the voice parts for about half of the others. The D'Oyly Carte Opera Company commissioned Edward German to complete the numbers Sullivan had sketched and to compose the rest of the opera himself. Carte himself died on 27 April 1901, and the opera was produced by his widow, Helen, who engaged William Greet as manager of the Savoy Theatre during the run of The Emerald Isle.

German, to this point, was known chiefly as a composer of orchestral and incidental music. The Emerald Isle was sufficiently successful to launch German on an operatic career. German's most famous opera was Merrie England (1902), also written with Hood, and Hood went on to a very successful career as an adapter of European operettas for the English stage.

Unlike Hood's first opera with Sullivan, The Rose of Persia, The Emerald Isle does not pay much homage to the Gilbert and Sullivan comic tradition, except for the mistaken identities and the fact that the opera was written for the same opera company and its regular performers. The plot is not reminiscent of Gilbert's topsy-turvy style, nor is there any obvious satiric point. With its Irish jigs and broad comedy, the work was more at home in the musical comedy style that had become prevalent on the London stage by the end of the 1890s. Sullivan's music has been described as "reminiscent rather than fresh", while German's contributions to the score, though partly imitative of Sullivan, marked him as a comic opera composer of promise.

== Roles and original cast ==
- The Earl of Newtown, K.P. (Lord Lieutenant of Ireland) (bass-baritone) – Jones Hewson
- Dr. Fiddle, D.D. (his Private Chaplain) (tenor) – Robert Rous
- Terence O'Brian (a Young Rebel) (tenor) – Robert Evett
- Professor Bunn (Shakespearean Reciter, Character Impersonator, etc.) (comic baritone) – Walter Passmore
- Pat Murphy (a Fiddler) (lyric baritone) – Henry A. Lytton
- Irish Peasants:

Black Dan (baritone) – W. H. Leon
Mickie O'Hara (non-singing) – C. Earldon

- H.M. 11th Regiment of Foot:

Sergeant Pincher (bass) – Reginald Crompton
Private Perry (non-singing) – Powis Pinder/Charles Childerstone

- Sentry (non-singing)
- The Countess of Newtown (contralto) – Rosina Brandram
- Lady Rosie Pippin (her Daughter) (soprano) – Isabel Jay
- Molly O'Grady (a Peasant Girl) (mezzo-soprano) – Louie Pounds
- Susan (Lady Rosie's Maid) (mezzo-soprano) – Blanche Gaston-Murray
- Peasant Girls:

Nora (non-singing) – Lulu Evans
Kathleen (soprano) – Agnes Fraser

- Chorus of Irish Peasants and Soldiers of 11th Regiment of Foot

== Synopsis ==
According to the libretto, the action takes place "About a Hundred Years Ago."

=== Act I ===
Scene: Outside the Lord Lieutenant's Country Residence.

Jones Hewson as the Lord Lieutenant

In a picturesque Irish village, the chorus speculate that Terence O'Brian, a local hero who has long been absent abroad, will soon return. O'Brien indeed appears, but they mistake him for a Saxon (hated by the Irish) because of his English accent. He assures them that, although he was educated at Oxford, he is thoroughly Irish, and is in fact descended from one of the ancient Irish kings, Brian Boru.

Pat Murphy, a blind fiddler, tells O'Brien that the Lord Lieutenant has compelled all of the villagers to adopt English customs and speak in English accents. O'Brien vows to restore Irish customs to the district; he requires only a suitable tutor to re-educate the local people, since they have all forgotten how to be Irish.

Professor Bunn enters. He has overheard the conversation. Although the Lord Lieutenant has hired him to be the Local Professor of English Elocution, he assures them that he can also train the local peasantry to be typically Irish. O'Brien is sceptical, but as Bunn has overheard them, they decide it would be better to forcibly initiate him into their secret society, the Clan-na-Gael. O'Brien tells Bunn that the ceremony will take place at midnight, at the Caves of Carrig-Cleena.

O'Brien is secretly engaged to the Lord Lieutenant's daughter, Lady Rosie Pippin. While he goes off for a secret rendezvous, he leaves Bunn in Murphy's custody. Once they are alone, Murphy admits that he isn't blind at all; he has only feigned blindness. But he is in love with Molly O'Grady, and he wants to tell her how beautiful she is, which he cannot do unless his "blindness" is cured. He suggests that Professor Bunn impersonate a doctor, who will restore his sight. Molly then enters, but she says that if Bunn could cure Murphy, she would marry Bunn. For now, Murphy decides to remain blind, after all.

Jealous of Bunn, Murphy tells O'Brien that Bunn can't be trusted. O'Brien threatens Bunn with death, but offers him a reprieve if he can manage to get a letter to Lady Rosie's maid, which O'Brien himself has been unable to do. Bunn mesmerises the guard at the gate of the Lieutenant's, and goes inside.

Molly warns O'Brien that the Caves of Carrig-Cleena are a dangerous hiding place for the rebels, because fairies reside there. She tells him that the Fairy Cleena, their Queen, has taken a fancy to Blind Murphy, and does his house chores. (It is, in fact, Molly who has been doing them.) Molly and Murphy tell O'Brien the legend of the Fairy Cleena.

Rosie, having received O'Brien's message, comes out to greet him. From Rosie and her maid, Susan, he learns that Bunn had delivered a letter to the Lord Lieutenant himself. O'Brien is now even more convinced that Bunn can't be trusted, but as he wants to be alone with Rosie, he directs Susan to keep an eye on the Professor. However, after Bunn tells Susan he's a detective from Scotland Yard, she allows him to leave, noting that she is much enchanted by detectives. He goes into Murphy's cottage to change into a disguise, which he has brought with him.

The Lord Lieutenant enters, with the Countess and Dr. Fiddle. The Lieutenant is expecting Professor Bunn, who cannot be found. However, he has received an anonymous note warning that the rebel leader Terence O'Brien is in the area, and his hiding place is Carrig-Cleena. The Lieutenant vows to send troops to exterminate the rebels.

Molly and Murphy have overheard this. Learning that Murphy is a musician, the Lieutenant hires him to play the bagpipes, anticipating a victory over the rebels. Molly is aghast when he accepts, as she believes his loyalties should be on the Irish side.

Bunn and the soldiers

Rosie, too, is distraught, as she fears O'Brien will be in grave danger, but it turns out O'Brien has not yet left for the caves. Rosie warns him that soldiers are on the way, and O'Brien is sure that Bunn has betrayed them. Bunn comes out of Murphy's cottage dressed as an old man, but O'Brien quickly sees through the disguise. O'Brien threatens to kill him, but Molly comes forward with an idea for deterring the soldiers. She knows they are afraid of fairies. She plans to tell them that the Caves of Carrig-Cleena are haunted, and she will impersonate the Fairy Cleena herself. Thinking quickly, Professor Bunn offers to tell the soldiers that he has been imprisoned by the fairies for the last fifty years, and that the same fate awaits them should they go near the caves. Terrence concludes that Bunn will be useful, after all.

The soldiers enter with great pomp. Molly, Bunn, and the others play out their trick, and as expected the soldiers are greatly affected by it. Murphy suggests that the fairies can cure his blindness, but Molly (impersonating the Fairy Cleena) insists that they cannot. The Lord Lieutenant orders the soldiers to attack the rebels, but they have been taken in by the ruse. Panic-stricken, the soldiers disperse.

=== Act II ===
Scene: The Caves of Carrig Cleena.

The peasant rebels nervously await the soldiers' arrival. At first, they are relieved when O'Brien tells them of Professor Bunn's successful ruse. But then Molly rushes in, and tells them the soldiers have changed their minds, and that Carrig-Cleena is now surrounded. Once again, O'Brien suspects that Professor Bunn has deceived them. Bagpipes are heard in the distance, which they all presume are played by Blind Murphy. They suspect that he, too, is a spy.

Rosie and Susan enter. The rebels are aghast to learn that O'Brien's lover is no other than the Lord Lieutenant's daughter. He explains that they had met in London, before they realized that they were on opposite sides of the conflict. He says that they are engaged, but Rosie warns that they cannot be married without her father's consent, which he would never give.

Professor Bunn arrives, and the rebels seize him. O'Brien tells Bunn that the only way he can avoid death is if he can frighten away the eight hundred English soldiers that are now surrounding the area. They develop a plan whereby Molly will once again appear as the Fairy Cleena, with her image projected on the rocks by an apparatus that Bunn provides. Bunn is to appear as a goblin. Rosie will hide behind the rocks and sing a love-song, purportedly the fairies' siren song.

Murphy arrives. He plans to pretend that he has spoken with the fairies, and is cured of his blindness. Professor Bunn decides to try the elaborate ruse. Rosie sings in the background, with Molly's image projected on the rocks. Murphy is overwhelmed, and falls senseless on the stage. O'Brien, however, is not impressed, as the idea was that Murphy would run off and tell the soldiers what had happened, frightening them away. Bunn persuades O'Brien to let him have one more try at it.

When Murphy revives, the rebels accuse him of being a spy, and they put him on trial. Molly stands up in his defence, pointing out that a blind man can't be a spy. Murphy finally admits that he has never been blind. Molly is ashamed by his deception. Terence tells Murphy that he is banished. He sings a sad farewell, and Molly is moved. She admits that she loves him.

The Sergeant enters in advance of the troops. O'Brien warns him of the dangerous Fairy Cleena. Professor Bunn bewitches the Sergeant, and when the Lord Lieutenant enters with the Countess, they find the Sergeant apparently insane. Professor Bunn tells the Lieutenant that he is a researcher looking for fairies and has found them. The Lieutenant doesn't believe him, and he asks Dr. Fiddle to confirm that fairies do not exist.

As there are no rebels around, the Lieutenant believes he has been tricked. He offers a reward of a thousand guineas to anyone who can identify the person responsible. Professor Bunn admits to writing the letter and asks for the reward. The Lieutenant says that he shall have it, but that he will also be shot for rebellion.

The rebels appear, and the Lieutenant orders their arrest. O'Brien steps forward and insists that if anyone is to be shot, he should be the first. Rosie takes her place at his side, and tells her father that they are in love. The Lieutenant insists that she may only marry a man of royal blood. O'Brien replies that he is descended from Brian Boru, an ancient King of Ireland, which removes the Lieutenant's objection, but the Lieutenant responds that O'Brien will nevertheless be shot for treason.

Professor Bunn, however, points out that all English noblemen nowadays are more than half American, and America is the friend of Ireland. Therefore, the Lieutenant is a friend of the rebels, and it would be absurd to have them shot. The Lieutenant agrees that this is conclusive, and all ends happily.

== Musical numbers ==
- Overture (includes "We don't intend to go to Carrig-Cleena", "Bedad it's for him" and the "Jig") †

Act I

- 1. "Have ye heard the brave news?" (Chorus of Peasants) ‡
- 2. "My Friends... I'm descended from Brian Boru" (Terence and Chorus) ‡
- 3. "Of Viceroys though we've had" (Murphy and Chorus)
- 4. "If you wish to appear as an Irish type" (Bunn and Chorus)
- 5. "On the Heights of Glantaun" (Molly, Terence, and Murphy)
- 6. "Two is Company" (Rosie, Susan, Terence & Bunn)
- 7. Entrance of Lord Lieut., Countess and Chaplain: "I am the Lord Lieutenant" (Lord Lieut., Countess, and Dr. Fiddle)

Newspaper illustration showing scenes from the original production

- 8. "At an early stage of life" (Lord Lieut. with Rosie, Countess, and Dr. Fiddle)
- 9. "When Alfred's friends their king forsook" (Countess) †
- 10. "Oh, setting sun you bid the world good-bye" (Rosie) †
- 11. "Their courage high you may defy" (Rosie, Susan, Molly, Terence and Bunn)
- 12. Entrance of Soldiers: "That we're soldiers no doubt you will guess" (Chorus of Soldiers and Girls)
- 13. "Now this is the song of the Devonshire Men" (Sergeant and Chorus) †
- 14. Entrance of Bunn: "It is past my comprehension... Many years ago I strode" (Bunn and Molly with Chorus)
- 15. "Their fathers fought at Ramillies" (Ensemble)

Act II

- 16. "Is there anyone approachin" (Chorus of Peasant Men with Dan)
- 17. "Bedad, it's for him that will always employ" (Chorus of Men) †
- 18. "Jig" (Peasants) †
- 18a. "Och, the spalpeen! Let him drown!" (Chorus) †
- 19. "Oh have you met a man in debt" (Terence and Chorus)
- 20. "Twas in Hyde Park, beside the row" (Rosie, Terence, and Chorus)
- 21. "I cannot play at love" (Molly, Kathleen, Bunn, Rosie, and Chorus) †
- 22. "Oh the age, in which we're living" (Bunn, with Susan) †
- 23. "Sing a rhyme" (Kathleen, Terence, Bunn, Susan, and Chorus)
- 24. "Listen, hearken my lover" (Rosie, Terence and Murphy) †
- 25 "Good-bye my native town" (Murphy) †
- 26. "I love you! I love you!" (Molly and Murphy) †
- 27. "There was once a little soldier" (Terence with Chorus)
- 28. "With a big shillelagh" (Ensemble)

† – Number composed entirely by German
‡ – Number composed entirely by Sullivan
