= Gentleman Joe =

- The Hansom Cabbie
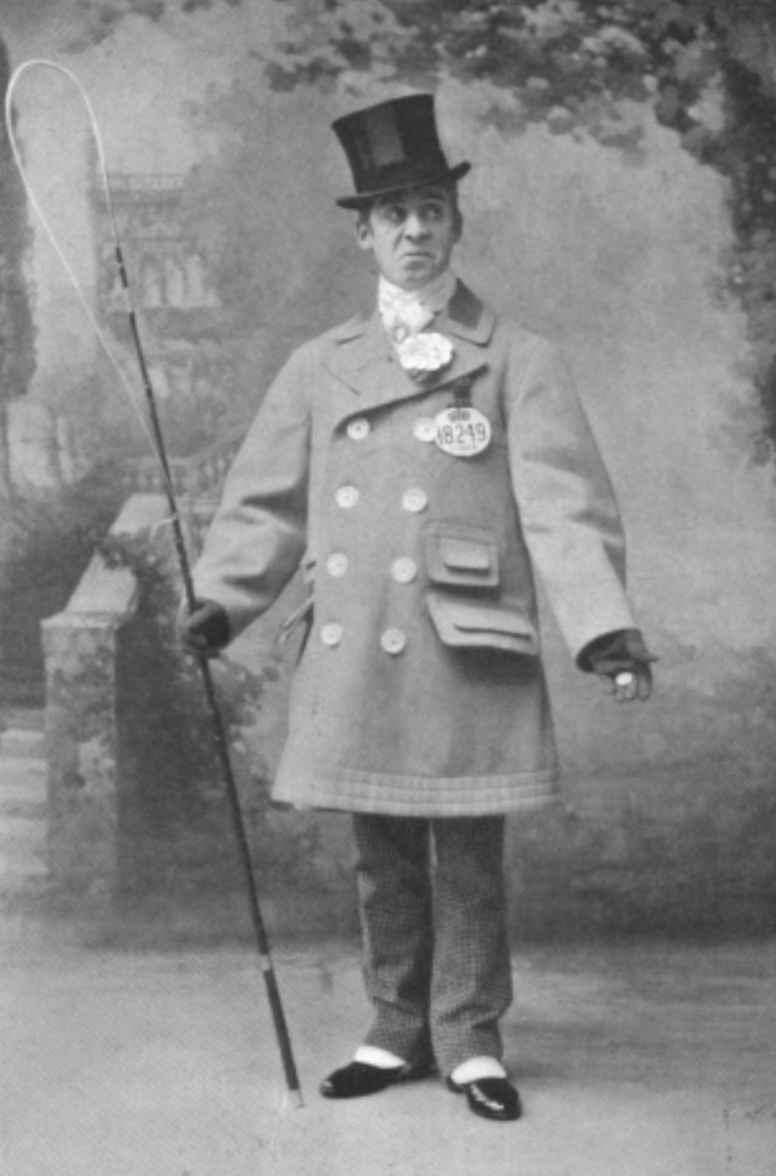
- Arthur Roberts as Joe
- Music: Walter Slaughter
- Lyrics: Basil Hood
- Book: Basil Hood
- Productions: 1895 West End

Gentleman Joe, The Hansom Cabbie is a farcical musical comedy with music by Walter Slaughter and a libretto by Basil Hood.

The original production of the musical opened at the Prince of Wales's Theatre on 2 March 1895 and ran for a very successful 391 performances despite a poor notice in The Saturday Review by Bernard Shaw that dismissed the score: "The music, by Mr. Walter Slaughter, does not contain a single novel, or even passably fresh point, either in melody, harmony or orchestration." The show was written as a vehicle for the comedian Arthur Roberts. A short burlesque entitled A Trilby Triflet was introduced as part of Gentleman Joe a week after Looking for Trilby opened at the Haymarket Theatre. The Times newspaper praised Roberts for his imitation of Herbert Beerbohm Tree. The cast of Gentleman Joe also included Kitty Loftus as Emma and W. H. Denny as Pilkington Jones. A second company also presented the show in the British provinces beginning in 1895.

There was soon a Newark, New Jersey production in late 1895 at Miner's Theatre and then the production transferred to the Fifth Avenue Theatre in New York City in January 1896. An American production of Gentleman Joe also played at the Bijou Theatre in early 1896 featuring Louis De Lange, James T. Powers, Clara Wieland, and Flora Irwin. Songs interpolated include "He Wanted Something to Play With" (sung by Powers) and "Honey does you love yer man?" sung by Flora Irwin in blackface. A few notices of the show indicate that new songs were interpolated with frequency.

Gentleman Joe was Hood's first full-scale musical comedy, and its success prompted him to leave the military to concentrate on his writing. Hood and Slaughter went on to write several more comedies together, including The French Maid in 1896 and another successful vehicle for Roberts, Dandy Dan, the Lifeguardsman in 1897. Hood wrote several successful shows with other librettists, and his English versions of Viennese operettas, such as The Merry Widow, were very popular until World War I.
