= Terry's Theatre =

- Grand Casino Cinema (1910)
- Terry's Theatre in 1887
- Interactive map of Terry's Theatre
- Address: Strand; Westminster, London
- Coordinates: 51.510556°N 0.120833°W
- Owner: Edward Terry
- Capacity: 800 seated on 3 tiers
- Type: West End theatre
- Designation: demolished

Construction
- Opened: 1887
- Closed: 1923
- Rebuilt: 1905 Frank Matcham; 1910 conversion to cinema
- Architect: Walter Emden

Terry's Theatre was a West End theatre in the Strand, in the City of Westminster, London. Built in 1887, it became a cinema in 1910 before being demolished in 1923.

== History ==
The theatre was built in 1887, near Fountain's Court, on the site of a former public house, the Old Coal Hole, and was designed by Walter Emden for the publican, Charles Wilmot and a Dr Web. The theatre was built to accommodate 800, seated in pit and stalls, balcony and a dress circle. Fountain's Court was named for 'Fountain's Tavern', where the Fountain Club met – formed by Robert Walpole's political opponents. In 1826, Edmund Kean, the actor, founded a late supper club here, known as the 'Wolf Club' for carousing. It ran until the 1850s, introducing entertainments similar to Evans Music-and-Supper Rooms, in nearby Covent Garden.

Edward Terry, as owner-manager, opened the theatre on 17 October 1887, with the farce The Churchwarden, followed by The Woman Hater. Terry had been the leading comedian of the Royal Strand Theatre and then starred in John Hollingshead's company at the Gaiety before entering theatre management. He achieved considerable success with his own production of Arthur Wing Pinero's Sweet Lavender, which opened at Terry's Theatre on 21 March 1888 and ran for 683 performances, producing a £20,000 profit. The play was quickly revived. Its cast included Terry, Brandon Thomas, Maude Millett and Carlotta Addison.

Thomas Hardy's The Three Wayfarers premièred at the theatre on 3 June 1893 with four other one act plays on the bill. This was typical of theatres of the time, offering 3–4 one-act plays commencing at 7:45pm, and running until 11pm. Many of the principal parts would be taken by Terry, himself, with other members of a permanent company sharing the other roles. Pinero also wrote "In Chancery" (1890) and "The Times" (1892) for the theatre. Law's farce The New Boy played in 1894.

In 1894, Edward Laurillard became manager of the theatre, producing King Kodak, opening on 30 April 1894, with music by Alfred Plumpton and lyrics by Arthur Branscombe and a score by Walter Slaughter. Little Christopher Columbus transferred to the theatre in 1894. Stephens and Yardley's The Passport played at the theatre in 1895. Madeline Ryley's Jedbury Junior played in 1896. W. H. Griffiths became manager, and there was a further success for Slaughter, with the opening of The French Maid, on 24 April 1897, transferring the following year to the Vaudeville Theatre and running for a total of 480 performances, with Louie Pounds in the title role, before transferring to New York. During the Christmas season, 1897–98, a series of matinees consisting of short musicals for children by Basil Hood and Walter Slaughter played with much success at the theatre.

With Frederick Mouillot installed as manager, My Lady Molly, a comic opera, ran for 342 performances between 14 March 1903–16 January 1904. Ib and Little Christina was revived at the theatre for short runs in both 1903 and 1904.

The theatre was remodelled by Frank Matcham in 1905, and in 1906 H. A. Jones' comedy The Heroic Stubs premièred. After further changes to the building, it was reopened on 24 October 1910 as the Grand Casino cinema, a part of the "Bey Circuit". It was finally demolished in 1923 to facilitate a road widening scheme. An office block, named "Norman House" stands on the site, with shops below. The modern Coal Hole public house stands near, but not on, the former site of the theatre.
