= Kate Cutler =

English singer and actress (1864–1955)

Kate Cutler, circa 1890s

Kate Ellen Louisa Cutler (14 August 1864 – 14 May 1955) was an English singer and actress, known in the late nineteenth and early twentieth centuries as an ingénue in musical comedies, and later as a character actress in comic and dramatic plays. She is possibly best known for walking out of the lead role in Noël Coward's The Vortex in 1924 shortly before opening night.

== Early years ==
Cutler was born in Marylebone, London, daughter of Henry Cutler, a singer, and his wife Mary Ann, née Tims. She trained at a conservatoire in Watford, north of London, where one of her tutors described her as "an ideal Cherubino" in Mozart's The Marriage of Figaro. Her career, however, took her not into opera, but into operetta and then musical comedy.

== Musical stage ==
In 1888, she appeared in London at Toole's Theatre as Inez in Charles Lecocq's Pepita, and the following year created the role of Malaguene in Robert Planquette's Paul Jones. Her debut in musical comedy was in George Edwardes's In Town at the Gaiety Theatre in 1893, in a small ingénue role and later deputising for the star, Florence St. John. Later that year, she was similarly cast as Lady Edytha Aldwyn in A Gaiety Girl, also covering for and later succeeding Decima Moore in the lead role. In 1895, she was a replacement player in the title role in The Shop Girl at the Gaiety and appeared in Gentleman Joe at the Prince of Wales's Theatre and as Connie in All Abroad at the Criterion Theatre.

The same year, Cutler played the title role, Trilby, in A Model Trilby; or, A Day or Two After Du Maurier, by Charles H. E. Brookfield and William Yardley, with music by Meyer Lutz, produced at the Opera Comique by the retired Nellie Farren. The piece was a burlesque of the Haymarket Theatre's hit adaptation of the 1894 George du Maurier novel Trilby. The Times thought that Cutler was "winsome and engaging". The Daily Telegraph wrote that she was "the best and most willing of all the Trilbys, an actress of real charm. Whenever she warbles a sweet little melody, or prides herself on her string of lovers, or whistles a plaintive refrain, the new Trilby is from first to last attractive and delightful". In 1896, she played Dorothy in Monte Carlo at the Avenue Theatre.

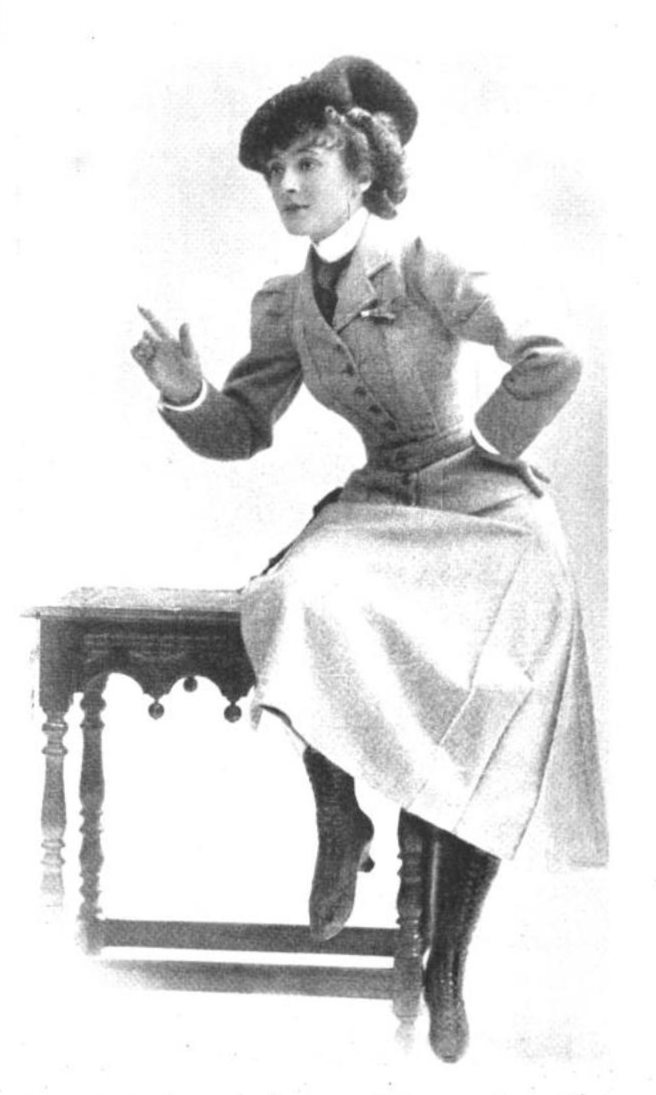
In Little Miss Nobody

After playing such junior roles in musical comedies, Cutler achieved star status as the title character, Suzette, in The French Maid in 1897, followed by further successes as Elsie Crockett in Little Miss Nobody the following year, Catarma in L' Amour Mouille in 1899 and Angela in Florodora that same year. In April 1900, Cutler married her first husband, Sidney Ellison, who was the director and choreographer of Florodora. The marriage was unsuccessful, and they separated before his death in 1930. She next played Victoria Chaffers in H.M.S. Irresponsible in 1901.

Cutler's other successes in this period included A Chinese Honeymoon (as a replacement in the role of Princess Soo-Soo in 1902), Norah Chalmers in The Girl from Kays (1902), Grace Rockingham in The Love Birds (1904) and Victoire in A Man's Shadow. She played this role in a Command Performance at Windsor Castle on 17 November 1904. The next year, she originated the role of Baroness Papouche in The Spring Chicken (1905). Her appearances in musical comedy were well received, with The Times commenting, "Miss Cutler may be depended upon to make the most of what she undertakes ... A soothing tint of freshness in a great deal of blare and noise". While appearing in The Spring Chicken, Cutler took a special omnibus every day, between acts, from the Gaiety Theatre to the Palace Theatre, where she appeared for 20 minutes in Hero and Heroine. The bus contained a dressing room in which she changed from one costume to another each way on the short journey.

== Comedy and character roles ==
After 1905, Cutler gave up the musical stage and concentrated on comic plays. She appeared with Herbert Beerbohm Tree as Felise in a revival of The Red Lamp and as Lady Stutfield in A Woman of No Importance in 1907. In 1908, she played Peggy in All-of-a-Sudden Peggy, played Nan in Good for Nothing, toured as Dorothy in Her Son, and had a success as Madame Henriette in Bellamy the Magnificent. These were followed by roles too numerous to name over the next fifteen years. She played both in English classics, such as The Rivals, and in new works by Somerset Maugham and Max Beerbohm, co-starring with Charles Hawtrey, Marie Lohr, Lewis Waller and George Alexander, among others.

In the 1920s, Cutler, by then in her late fifties, continued to play a varied and busy schedule of leading and character roles appropriate for her age. She is perhaps most remembered, however, for one that she did not play. Cast as the nymphomaniac mother in Noël Coward's early play The Vortex (1924), which Coward had written specifically for her, she pulled out of the role less than a week before the piece was due to open, upset by a last-minute rewrite that she believed diminished her role. Coward managed to recruit Lilian Braithwaite to take on the role. The play was a sensational success, with Cutler, as Coward said, throwing away one of the best opportunities of her life. Cutler subsequently had good roles in classic and new plays, including The Country Wife, and Dear Octopus.

Cutler performed in films between 1929 and 1938, including Such Is the Law (1930), The Great Gay Road (1931), Lord of the Manor (1933), Come Out of the Pantry (1935) and Moscow Nights (1935). Her last film was Pygmalion in 1938. The Manchester Guardian said of her in an obituary notice, "She proved that an actress who can play the lead in musical comedy can go on to play the lead in anything else. ... She was a really accomplished actress with that indefinable quality which we call style."

Cutler's second husband, Major Charles Dudley Ward, predeceased her. She died at her home in London, age 90.
