= Walter Slaughter =

English conductor and composer (1860–1908)

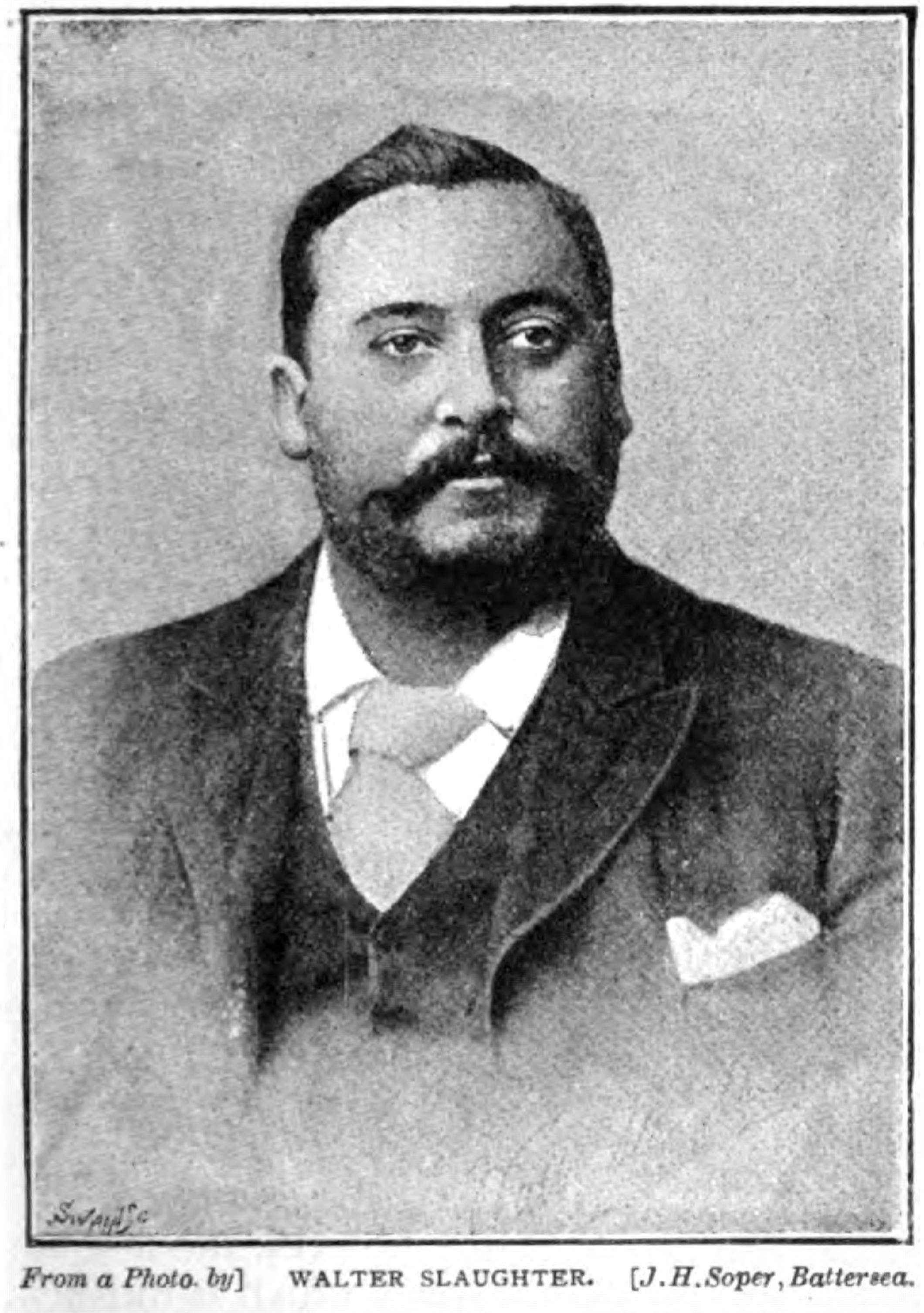
Walter Alfred Slaughter 1892

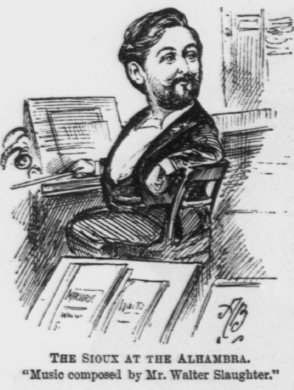
Walter Slaughter - 1891 caricature

Walter Alfred Slaughter (17 February 1860 – 2 March 1908) was an English conductor and composer of musical comedy, comic opera and children's shows. He was engaged in the West End as a composer and musical director from 1883 to 1904.

== Life and career ==
=== Youth and education ===
Slaughter was born in Fitzroy Square, London. He attended the City of London School, and sang in the choir of St. Andrew's Church, Wells Street under Joseph Barnby. After leaving school, he worked in a wine merchant's office and then for the music publishers Metzler. While there, he studied music under Alfred Cellier, Berthold Tours, and Georges Jacobi, the musical director of the Alhambra Theatre. He was also brought into frequent contact with Arthur Sullivan, who gave him much encouragement and friendly advice. Slaughter once asked Sullivan the best way to study composition; Sullivan replied, "Take off your gloves, go into the orchestra and study it there, as an engineer studies his business in the engine room." Slaughter married Luna Lauri ("Mlle. Luna"), one of the two famous dancing daughters of John Lauri, ballet-master at the Alhambra Theatre. Their daughter, Marjorie Slaughter, also became a composer.

=== Early career ===
Slaughter served as the organist at St. Andrew's and as a cellist and pianist in music halls prior to becoming a musical director in West End theatre productions. Before he was 20, he had composed three ballets for the South London Palace. His early works also included some individual songs, one of which was the popular "The Dear Homeland". He composed the music for the successful all-women one-act opera di camera An Adamless Eden (1882 at the Opera Comique), which was produced in Britain and in America (1884) by Lila Clay's ladies' company. He also provided additional music in 1883, for the English adaptation of Edmond Audran's Gillette de Narbonne. After several one-act works, including Sly and Shy (1883), The Casting Vote (1885) and Marie's Honeymoon (1885), he wrote the score for what became the most successful musical version of Alice in Wonderland, in 1886, to a book and lyrics by Henry Savile Clarke. He also wrote a work called Sappho that year for the Opera Comique, which was not as well received because of a weak libretto.

Slaughter later wrote the score to the medieval comic opera Marjorie produced by the Carl Rosa Opera Company in 1890 (Prince of Wales's Theatre, 193 performances), and contributed to the Gaiety Theatre's Cinderella burlesque, Cinder-Ellen Up-too-Late in 1891 and King Kodak in 1894. In 1893 he composed the score for a musical farce, Peggy's Plot, for the German Reeds. At the same time, Slaughter composed incidental music for plays, including those produced at the St. James's Theatre, while he was employed as the musical director there, including, in 1890, Walter Frith's Molierè and Quinton and Hamilton's Lord Anerley; in 1891, Haddon Chambers's The Idler; and in 1892, Oscar Wilde's Lady Windermere's Fan and Donna Luiza (with Basil Hood as librettist).

=== Peak years ===
Theatre poster for The French Maid, 1897

Slaughter's breakthrough success came in 1895 in collaboration with Hood with the musical comedy Gentleman Joe, The Hansom Cabbie as a vehicle for the low comic Arthur Roberts. Bernard Shaw dismissed the score in The Saturday Review: "The music, by Mr. Walter Slaughter, does not contain a single novel, or even passably fresh point, either in melody, harmony or orchestration." However, the show ran for 391 performances and enjoyed a New York production the following year. This was followed in 1896 by another collaboration with Hood that produced The French Maid, which debuted at Terry's Theatre and was a long-lived international success (480 performances in London, and a long-running New York production), and the less successful Belinda. He also wrote incidental music to Henry James's Guy Domville (1895) and The Prisoner of Zenda (1896) around this time. In 1897, Basil Hood and Slaughter wrote a series of short children's musicals based on fairy tales that received warm reviews.

Also with Hood, Slaughter wrote a farcical musical comedy, Dandy Dan the Lifeguardsman (1897, Lyric Theatre), another successful vehicle for Roberts, and Orlando Dando, The Volunteer (1898), a similar success for Dan Leno at the Fulham Grand Theatre and then on tour. Next, Slaughter wrote three shows for the Vaudeville Theatre managed by Seymour Hicks. The most successful of these was Bluebell in Fairyland (1901), produced by Charles Frohman and starring Hicks and his wife, Ellaline Terriss. This turned out to be the most popular Christmas entertainment of its time and was continually revived for the next four decades. Other 1901 works were Little Miss Modesty and The English Rose. An English Daisy, written with Hicks, was produced on Broadway with a Kingston run in 1902.

Slaughter wrote several more shows, including Little Hans Andersen with Hood (1903) and The Hooligan Band with Charles H. Taylor (1906). He also served as the first musical director for Oswald Stoll at the London Coliseum from 1904 to 1906.

He died in London in 1908 at the age of 48.
