= Arthur Roberts (comedian) =

English comedian, music hall entertainer and actor (1852–1933)

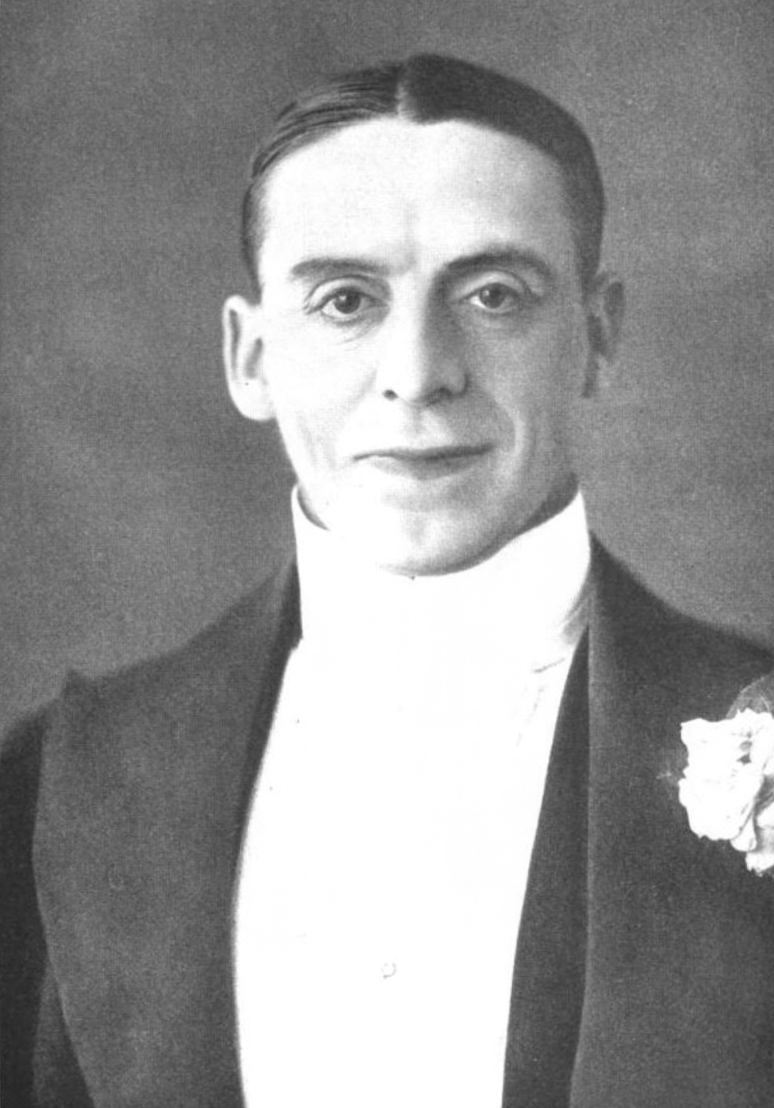
In The Sketch, 18 October 1899

Arthur Roberts (21 September 1852 – 27 February 1933) was an English comedian, music hall entertainer and actor. He was famous for portraying the pantomime dames and later for his comic characters and "gagging" in farces, burlesques and musical comedies. He is credited with coining the word spoof.

== Biography ==
=== Early life and career ===
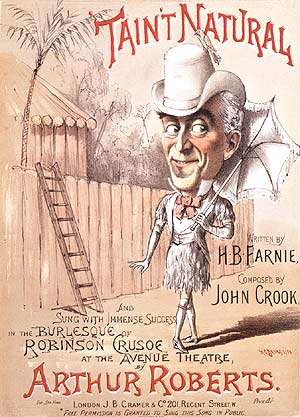
Music from Roberts's song in Robinson Crusoe

Roberts was born in Kentish Town, London, the son of a Savile Row tailor who attended to Edward, Prince of Wales. His father's death when Roberts was 12 left the family in "a grim struggle for existence". Roberts walked three miles a day to work in a seed shop in Covent Garden. He joined a choral society and sang at the Crystal Palace.

Roberts began performing professionally in 1871 after being persuaded to sing by an impresario from Norfolk who was busking near Roberts' home in Bayswater. He performed "The Mad Butcher", which he was later paid £1 a week to sing on the beach at Great Yarmouth. The following summer, Roberts moved to Great Yarmouth and regularly performed for tourists on a makeshift stage erected on the nearby pier. He later progressed to appearing in upmarket hotels at the seaside resort.

In 1875, Roberts was engaged to appear at the New Star theatre in Bermondsey. The following year he performed "If Only I Was Long Enough" at the Oxford Music Hall, which he considered a major breakthrough in his career. In 1877 he toured the London music hall circuit and culminated each round of touring with an appearance at Evans's supper room, where he developed a reputation for performing risqué songs. In 1879, one of his "saucy" songs caused Evans's to lose its licence for a year. (Note: Evans's Supper Rooms, established by W. C. Evans, was located in the basement of a hotel in King Street, Covent Garden.)

=== Theatre successes and later years ===
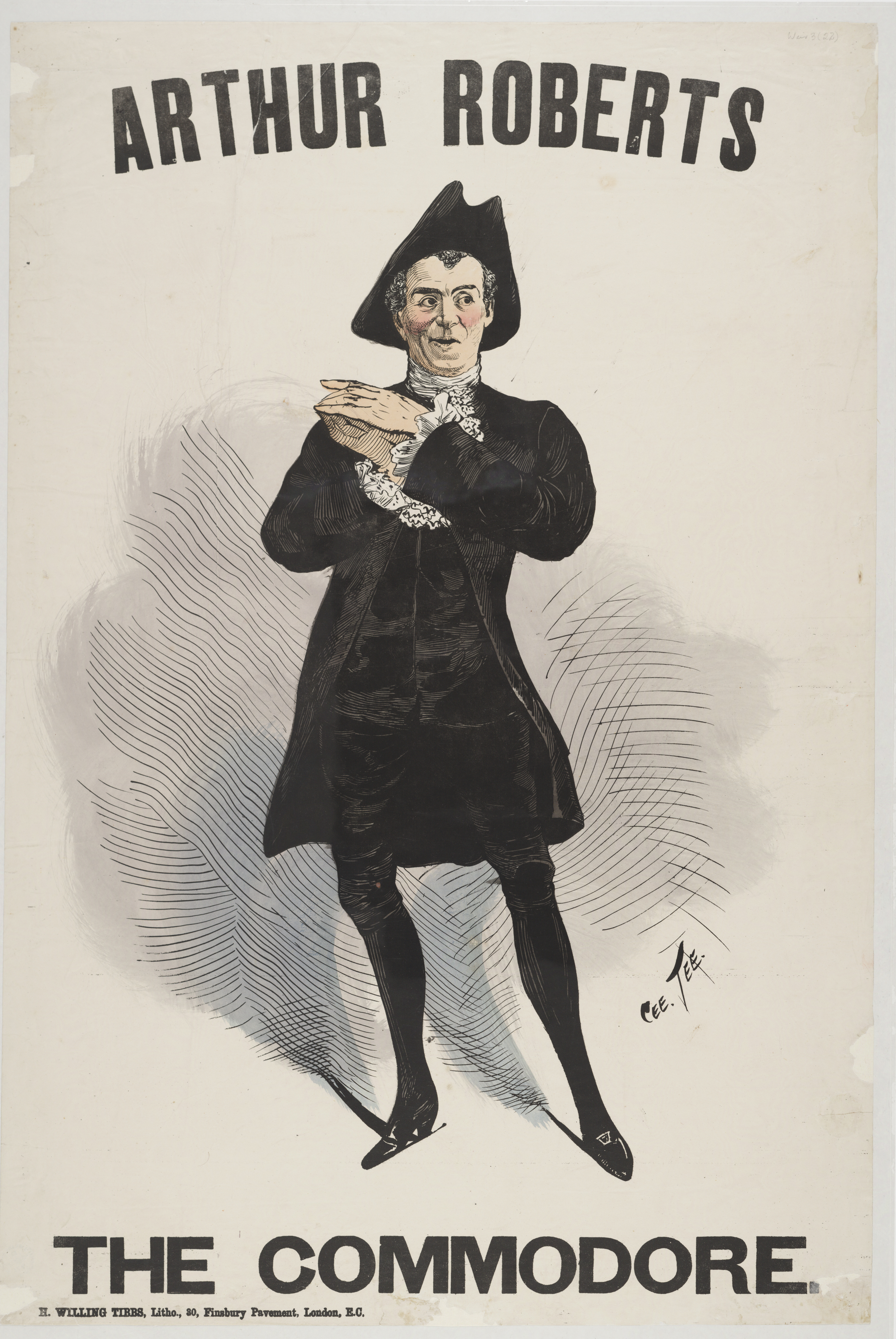
Roberts in The Commodore, 1886

In the legitimate theatre, he starred as Dr. Syntax in the Drury Lane Theatre pantomime Mother Goose (1880); as Mrs. Crusoe in Robinson Crusoe (1881 and 1886); in Sindbad the Sailor (1882; a show he repeated in 1906); in H. B. Farnie's Nell Gwynne (1884); in Farnie's The Grand Mogul (1884 with Florence St. John, Fred Leslie and Frank Wyatt); Joe Tarradiddle in the English adaptation of Offenbach's La Vie parisienne; Stanley the explorer in the 1891 Gaiety Theatre burlesque of Joan of Arc by Adrian Ross and J. L. Shine, popularising the song "I went to find Emin"; in the early Edwardian musical comedy In Town (1892); Captain Arthur Coddington in the Gaiety burlesque of Don Juan (1893, by Meyer Lutz, A. C. Torr and Ross); Claude Du Val (1894), the title character in Gentleman Joe (1895); Black-Eyed See-Usan; and Dandy Dan the Lifeguardsman (1898), among others. Roberts had success in the 1890s with the hit song "Daddy Wouldn't Buy Me a Bow Wow".

Roberts coined the word spoof, which was popularised by a card game that he invented called Spoof, which involved trickery and nonsense. The first recorded reference to the game is in 1884. Soon the word took on the general meaning of "nonsense, trickery," first recorded in 1889. The verb spoof is first recorded in 1889 as well, in the sense "to deceive." These senses are now less widely used than the noun meaning of "a light parody or satirical imitation," first recorded in 1958, and the verb sense "to satirize gently," first recorded in 1927.

In 1907, Roberts was a leader in the "Music Hall War", striking for better working conditions, which led to the founding of the Variety Artist's Federation. At the end of his career, Roberts played in variety shows. Later in his career Roberts starred as Charioteer in Phi-Phi (1922). In 1926, he popularised the song "Topsey-Turvey", which he also used as the basis for a short 1927 film made in the Phonofilm sound-on-film process, directed by Bertram Phillips. In 1927, Roberts wrote an autobiography called Fifty Years of Spoof.

He died in London at the age of 80 and is buried in Paddington cemetery, London.

== Notes and references ==
Notes

== Sources ==
- Baker, Richard Anthony (2005). British Music Hall: An Illustrated History. London: Sutton Publishing Ltd. ISBN 0-7509-3685-1.
- Roberts, Arthur (1927). Fifty Years of Spoof. London: John Lane The Bodley Head.
