= Seymour Hicks filmography =

British actor, playwright and theatre manager

Sir Edward Seymour Hicks (30 January 1871 – 6 April 1949), better known as Seymour Hicks, was a British actor, music hall performer, playwright, screenwriter, theatre manager and producer. He became well known for writing, starring in and producing Edwardian musical comedy. Beginning in 1913, however, he had a significant film career. Hicks began in film during the silent era and continued to act in sound films.

His first role was for his own screenplay adaptation of A Christmas Carol, titled Scrooge, alongside William Lugg, J. C. Buckstone, and his wife Ellaline Terriss. His next film role was in the title role of the film biography David Garrick.

Hicks formed his own production company in 1923. The same year, he made his director's début, alongside Alfred Hitchcock, in Always Tell Your Wife although no director was credited on film itself. He wrote the screenplay for this, as well as for several films in the early 1930s. Hicks directed two more films: Sleeping Partners in 1930 and Glamour in 1931. Later notable films included The Lambeth Walk in 1939 and Busman's Honeymoon in 1940. He made his last supporting role in Silent Dust shortly before his death in 1949.

== Filmography ==
Year	Title	Role	Director credit	Writer credit
1912	The World Famous Musical Comedy Artistes Seymour Hicks and his wife Ellaline Terris in a Selection of Their Dances	On-screen participant		
1913	Scrooge	Scrooge		check
1913	David Garrick	David Garrick		
1923	Always Tell Your Wife	James Chesson	check	check
1927	Blighty	Armistice day enthusiast in hospital		
1930	Tell Tales	On-screen participant		
1930	Sleeping Partners	He	check	
1931	The Love Habit	Justin Abelard		check
1931	Glamour	Henry Garthorne	check	check
1932	Money for Nothing	Jay Cheddar		check
1934	The Secret of the Loch	Professor Heggie		
1935	Royal Cavalcade	Gentleman		
1935	Vintage Wine	Charles Popinot		check
1935	Mr What's His Name	Alfred Henfield		check
1935	Scrooge	Ebenezer Scrooge		
1936	It's You I Want	Victor Delaney		
1936	Eliza Comes to Stay	Sandy Verrall		
1937	Change for a Sovereign	Cast Member		
1939	The Lambeth Walk	Sir John Tremayne		
1939	Young Man's Fancy	Henry, Duke of Beaumont		
1940	Busman's Honeymoon	Mervyn Bunter		
1941	Pastor Hall	General von Grotjahn		
1947	Fame Is the Spur	Lord Lostwithiel, 'Old Buck'		
1949	Silent Dust	Lord Clandon		

Note: The source for the film appearances is the British Film Institute.
