= Aubrey Hopwood =

British lyricist and novelist

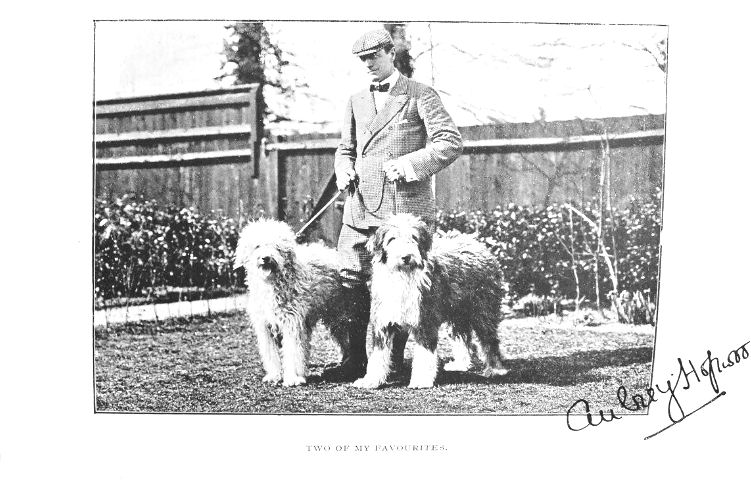
Aubrey Hopwood with two Old English Sheepdogs (1905)

Aubrey Hopwood (4 April 1863 – 25 October 1917) was a British lyricist of Edwardian musical comedy and a novelist and author of nonsense books for children. He co-wrote the lyrics for the musicals A Runaway Girl (1898) and The Lucky Star (1899), among others, and wrote additional lyrics for the 1900 revival of Henry Savile Clarke's 1886 operetta Alice in Wonderland.

== Early life ==
Theatre poster for A Runaway Girl (1898)

Born Henry Aubrey Hopwood in Edinburgh in 1863, he was the second son and one of nine children of Mary Augusta Henrietta née Coventry, (born 1841, the granddaughter of George Coventry, 8th Earl of Coventry, and John Turner Hopwood (1829‒1900), then Member of Parliament for Clitheroe in Lancashire. He attended Cheam School and Charterhouse. His younger brother was Rear Admiral Ronald Hopwood (1868‒1949), referred to as the "Poet Laureate" of the Royal Navy by Time magazine.

== Career ==
After a short period in which he served as a Lieutenant in the Northamptonshire Regiment, in 1884 he travelled to Orange County in Florida with his older brother, Robert Coventry De Vere Hopwood (1859‒1911), returning to the United States in 1886 and 1888. Hopwood was the Secretary of Arthur's, a gentlemen's club in London (1893–1907), and in 1897 he wrote the romantic adventure novel Down by the Suwanee River.

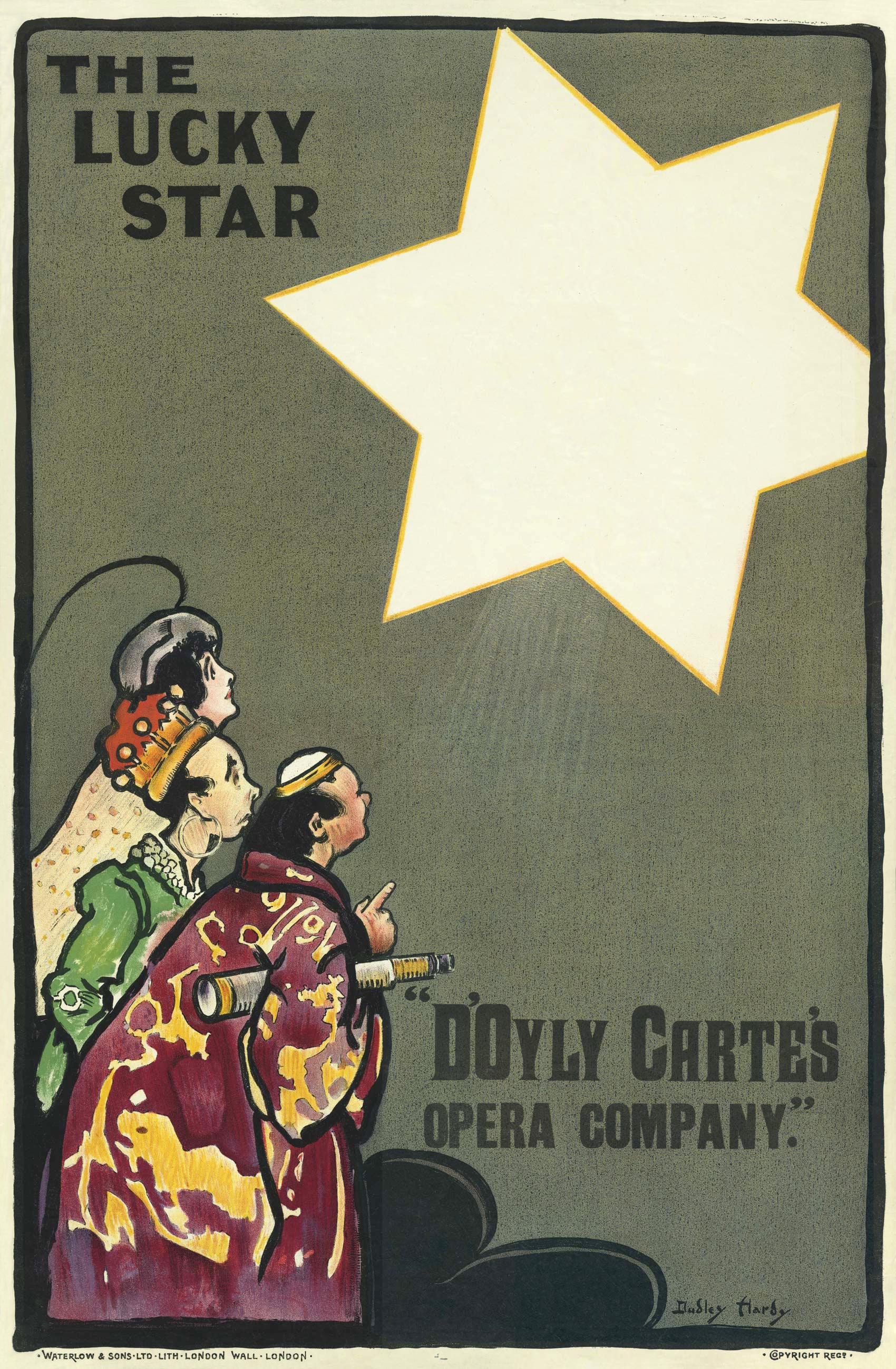
Poster for The Lucky Star (1899)

With Harry Greenbank he wrote the lyrics for the Edwardian musical comedy A Runaway Girl (1898) to a book by Seymour Hicks and Harry Nicholls and a score by Ivan Caryll and additional music by Lionel Monckton. It was produced by George Edwardes at the Gaiety Theatre in London, opening on 21 May 1898 and ran for a very successful 593 performances. The piece ran at Daly's Theatre in New York City in 1898 for 216 performances and again in 1900. The production starred Edmund Payne and Hicks's wife, Ellaline Terriss.

With Adrian Ross he wrote the lyrics for the Savoy Opera The Lucky Star (1899) to a score by Ivan Caryll and dialogue by Charles H. Brookfield (revised by Helen Lenoir). The Lucky Star was produced by the D'Oyly Carte Opera Company and opened at the Savoy Theatre on 7 January 1899 for a run of 143 performances. The opera starred the usual Savoy Theatre cast from that period, including Walter Passmore, Henry Lytton, Robert Evett, Ruth Vincent, Emmie Owen and Isabel Jay. Hopwood wrote the lyrics for the musical farce The Merry Go-Round (1899) to the book by Seymour Hicks and score by Meyer Lutz, with additional songs by Ellaline Terriss, among others. It was produced by Edwardes at the Gaiety and then toured the British provincial theatres in 1899, and it also was popular in Europe and the United States.

In 1900 Hopwood published his children's nonsense book The Bunkum Book, illustrated by Maud Trelawny. In 1900, he wrote additional lyrics for a revival of Henry Savile Clarke's 1886 stage adaptation of the Alice books by Lewis Carroll; the original composer, Walter Slaughter, provided additional music, and the show opened before Christmas 1900 starring Ellaline Terriss as Alice and Seymour Hicks as Mad Hatter. The musical one-act farce You And I, with a book by Hicks and lyrics by Hopwood to a score composed by Walter Slaughter opened at the Vaudeville Theatre on 24 April 1901. The Cherry Girl was another Edwardian musical comedy based on a book by Hicks with lyrics by Hopwood and music by Ivan Caryll. Described as a "children's fairy play", it opened at the Vaudeville Theatre in London on 21 December 1903. The original cast included Hicks, Courtice Pounds and Terriss. From August 1904 the play went on tour to the Theatre Royal in Glasgow and other British provincial theatres.

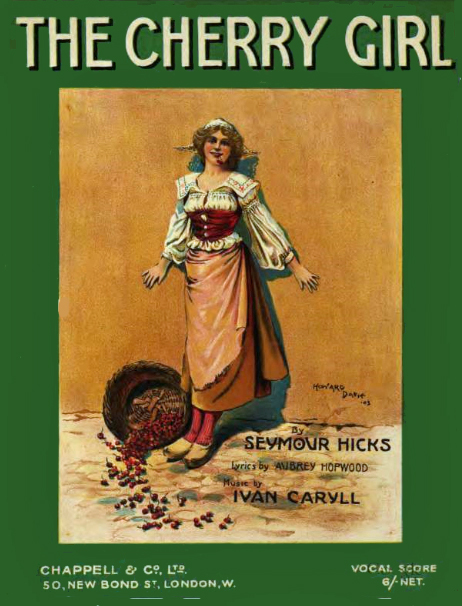
Cover of the vocal score of The Cherry Girl, 1903

In the 1901 census Hopwood listed himself as "an author" and in the same year he co-wrote lyrics, with Charles H. Taylor, for the "musical dream play" Bluebell in Fairyland at the Vaudeville Theatre (1901), with a book by Seymour Hicks and music by Walter Slaughter. The production ran for 294 performances until 26 June 1902 and featured Terriss in the title role and Hicks as the Sleeping King; Phyllis Dare was Mab. The critic from The Times described the production as "very dainty and charming", the music as "bright and tuneful", and the libretto as "full of humour". The play was revived in 1905, again in 1916 and was performed regularly during the pantomime season in London between 1917 and 1937. The play was adapted from the children's Christmas book The Sleepy King, a fairy tale written by Hopwood in 1898 in collaboration with Seymour Hicks and illustrated by Maud Trelawny. The Times described the book as "closely modelled on Alice in Wonderland, [and] is a clever and pretty imitation"; the critic for the St James's Gazette wrote that "The story is brimful of excellent fun, such as is bound to appeal to the hearts of children to whom the odd sayings and quaint antics of Blob and Blib, the extraordinary twins, should prove an inexhaustible source of mirth." In 1903 Hopwood published Rhymes without Reason, while in 1905 he published a non-fiction book, The Old English Sheepdog: From Puppyhood to Championship, A Handbook for Beginners.

== Later life ==
In the 1911 census Hopwood is listed as a "private secretary" living in Malmesbury, Wiltshire, at which time his widowed sister Eleanor Ramsay (1867‒1922) was staying with him. Later his sister rented a house, the Beeches on Burton Hill in Malmesbury, and Hopwood lived with her there until he was admitted to The Retreat, a centre for the treatment of people with mental health needs in York, where he died aged 54 in October 1917 from tuberculosis and paralytic dementia (GPI).

Hopwood never married, and in his will he left his estate of £1,264 15s to his sister, Eleanor Ramsay.
