= Stanley Brett =

- Born: Stanley Francis Hicks; 18 November 1879; Jersey, UK
- Died: 29 October 1923 (aged 44); London

Stanley Brett (18 November 1879 – 29 October 1923) was a British musical comedy actor and comedian.

== Career ==
Brett’s first appearance was a tour of Lord and Lady Algy in 1899. In 1902 he appeared with his brother Seymour Hicks and sister in law Ellaline Terriss in Bluebell in Fairyland and in Quality Street at the Vaudeville Theatre, London. In 1903 he appeared in The Cherry Girl, and in 1904 he played Higham Montague in The Catch of the Season. He then went on to succeed his brother in many other productions including The Beauty of Bath (1905), Aldwych and Hicks (1906) and Alice in Wonderland (1906). In 1908 he appeared in The Gay Gordons in Glasgow and Sweet and Twenty. In 1909 he appeared at the London Empire in the revue Come Inside During 1910 he appeared in music hall sketches. In 1911 he played Blind in Nightbirds. In 1912 he toured with The Gay Gordon's and also played Gaston Bocard in The Glad Eye, as well as A Girl in Possession at the London Pavilion. In 1914 he toured with Fred Karno in Flats and Full Inside at the Coliseum. In 1915 he toured with Always Tell Your Wife.

== Personal life ==
Brett was born in St Helier Jersey in 1879. He was the second son of Captain Hicks and the brother of actor Seymour Hicks and brother in law of Ellaline Terriss. He married musical comedy actress Maie Ash in 1909. They divorced in 1913.

Brett died in a nursing home in London in 1923. He was buried at Brompton Cemetery.
