= Bluebell in Fairyland =

- Music: Walter Slaughter
- Lyrics: Aubrey Hopwood and Charles H. Taylor
- Book: Seymour Hicks
- Productions: 1901 West End; 1905 West End; Numerous revivals

Bluebell in Fairyland is a Christmas-season children's entertainment described as "a musical dream play", in two acts, with a book by Seymour Hicks, lyrics by Aubrey Hopwood and Charles H. Taylor, and music by Walter Slaughter. It was produced by Charles Frohman. The creators sought to distinguish the work from a Christmas pantomime. The story concerns a flower girl, Bluebell, who on Christmas Eve goes to fairyland in search of the "Sleeping King", seeking to restore him to his throne, which has been usurped by the "Reigning King".

First produced in 1901 in London, Bluebell in Fairyland was a hit, running for 300 performances. The piece provided inspiration for J. M. Barrie's stories of Peter Pan.

== Background ==
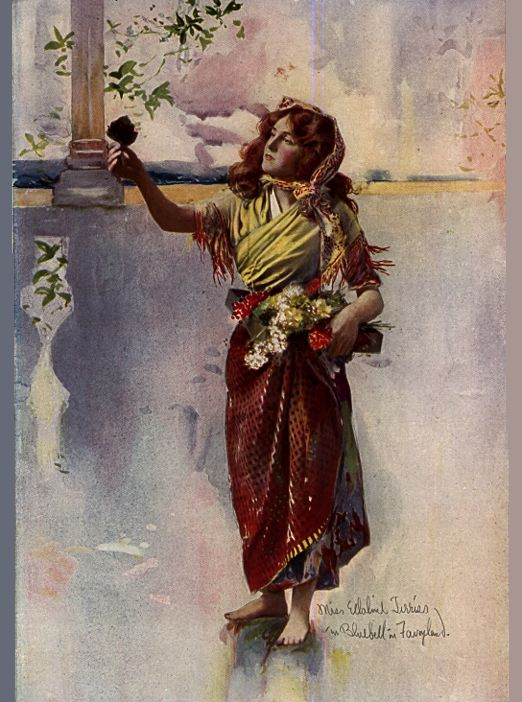
Ellaline Terriss in the title role

Seymour Hicks was a writer-producer-actor in London who, with his singer-actress wife, Ellaline Terriss, created a number of hit musicals and plays in London in the 1890s and for decades thereafter, later turning to film. Other successes in the years after Bluebell were The Cherry Girl (1902), Quality Street (1902), The Earl and the Girl (1903) and The Catch of the Season (1904). Hicks and Terriss were so successful with these shows that they were able to build two theatres with the profits, the Aldwych Theatre and the Hicks Theatre (now the Gielgud).

Bluebell in Fairyland was first produced at the Vaudeville Theatre in London on 18 December 1901 and played for two performances daily until it closed on 26 June 1902, running for 300 performances. It starred Hicks as Dicky and his wife, Terriss, as the title character. Phyllis Dare played Mab. Costumes were by C. Wilhelm. The play was a critical and financial hit; it was revived regularly in London over the next four decades and played in other theatres throughout Britain and elsewhere in the English-speaking world. When Hicks built the Aldwych Theatre, he opened the house in 1905 with a long-running revival of the work under the name Blue-Bell. The New York Times, reviewing the 1901 premiere, called the piece "really a charming and beautiful thing, of a simple, reminiscent kind, with capital music by Walter Slaughter and fine scenery.... Ellaline Terriss acts with exquisite simplicity ... while Hicks himself bears a large share of the work with his accustomed energy and confidence."

J. M. Barrie and his friends the Llewelyn Davies boys were so taken with the play that Barrie began to think about writing his own fairy play, and so it provided inspiration for the Peter Pan segment in his book The Little White Bird and the subsequent play Peter Pan, or The Boy Who Wouldn't Grow Up. In its review of the 1923 revival at the Aldwych, The Times said that the piece "wears quite well". It praised the cast, particularly Phyllis Black as Bluebell, Geoffrey Saville as Dickie, George Zucco as the Reigning King, and the children's chorus. Gladys Cooper, Jessie Matthews, Charles Hawtrey and many other actors began their careers as children in the piece.

== Synopsis ==
Act I

On Christmas Eve, Bluebell, a poor London flower girl, is dismayed that she has not sold enough flowers to purchase Christmas gifts for her little sisters, Mab and Winnie. Mr. Joplin, a wealthy merchant, who is struck by her beauty, has long wished to adopt Bluebell. She loiters in front of his house, but a policeman sends Bluebell away from Mr. Joplin's house and then lies about it. Dicky, a crossing sweeper, bootblack and Bluebell's sweetheart, together with his bootblack friends, tries to earn some money to help Bluebell. Mr. Joplin and his eccentric servants, Will and Won't, find Bluebell in the Strand, among her friends, a group of flower girls and boot blacks. He gives some money to Bluebell and sends her home. In a garret in Drury Lane, Bluebell's sisters and her faithful black cat, Peter, are preparing for Christmas. Bluebell arrives and reads to her sisters the story of the rich but miserly Sleepy King, who has been condemned to sleep until he should be awakened by a good girl with the peal of bells. The three girls soon fall asleep.

Bluebell dreams that the fairy queen and the fairies step out of the fireplace and ask Bluebell to come to the Palace where the reigning King of Fairyland has usurped the throne in the Sleepy King's absence. Bluebell and Peter soon meet two schoolboys, Blib and Blob, who are to escort them from the Palace to the dungeon where the Sleepy King is being held prisoner. Once at the Palace, however, she sees the reigning King and Queen. They are giving a children's party. Bluebell asks to be admitted, but instead she is arrested. The fairy queen rescues her, however, and leads her to the Sleepy King.

Act II

Bluebell meets Will o'the Wisp, who will help her. They then meet the Fairy Waterlilly, who leads them through creepy bogs and thickets to the Enchanted Glade, where they find the Magic Oak, which grows above the Sleepy King's dungeon. They witness the tragedy of the murder of Cock Robin. Peter kills the yellow dwarf who is guarding the Oak, and the group descends into the frightening cavern. After 300 years of sleep, the Sleepy King has grown old. Bluebell awakens him by ringing the bells, and he vows to distribute his wealth to the poor. They all head for the Palace, where the big party is still in progress. Everyone enters, and Bluebell introduces the Sleepy King, who is revealed as the rightful King. The reigning King and Queen are dethroned, and the King is transformed into a handsome young man, who asks Bluebell to be his queen. Bluebell sadly refuses, as the Christmas bells chime, because she must return to her two sisters, so she flees back to the garret.

It is morning, and as Bluebell and her sisters awaken, Mr. Joplin, his footmen and Dicky arrive. Mr. Joplin wants to adopt all three girls, to Dicky's great alarm. But Bluebell and Dicky become engaged, and all ends happily.

== Musical numbers ==
Act I

- Opening and Carol – "Hour by hour the dying year tolls its solemn warning; hour by hour the new draws near"
- Chorus of Flower Girls and Shoeblacks – "It's Christmas time, it's Christmas time, the best in all the year"
- Song – Blue-Bell – "Night by night in dark December, while the wintry winds blow chill"
- Trio – Will, Won't and Joplin – "Now, what you think that he meant when he said, 'Tut-tut!'"
- Duet – Blue-Bell and Dicky – "Suppose we try a music-hall, there's always lots of fun"
- Quartette – Girls and Cats – "Two little cats on the cold, cold leads – miaou, miaou, miaou"
- Vocal Gavotte – Blue-Bell – "Point your toe as you trip it lightly, raise your paw and smooth your fur"
- Chorus of Fairies – "Blue-bell, 'tis you whom the fairies have bidden; seek out the cave where the king lies asleep"
- Vocal Polka – "Brightly, brightly our party has now begun"
- Song – Queen and Regent, with Chorus – "A sense of humour is a thing that isn't wanted in a king"
- Duet – Blib and Blob – "That all that glitters is not gold, the copy-books instill"
- Trio – Blue-Bell, Blib and Blob – "I'm old Mother Hubbard who went to the cupboard to fetch the poor dog a bone"
- Finale Act I – "I'll ask the king if we may stay, I'm sure we shan't be turned away"

Act II

- Opening
- Song – Water Lily and Chorus – "When the stars begin to twinkle in the silent summer skies"
- Dance – Will o' the Wisp
- Dance – Autumn Leaves
- Chorus, with Dove, Sparrow, Fish, Beetle, Kite, Thrush, and Bull – "Who killed Cock Robin?"
- Entrance of Bluebell
- Chorus – "Peal, golden bells; let your music ring, from Fairyland's spells to waken a King"
- Sabot Dance
- Yacht Dance

== Roles and original cast ==
- Dicky (a crossing sweeper; also The Sleepy King) – Seymour Hicks
- Mr. Joplin (a city merchant; also The Owl) – J. C. Buckstone
- Will and Won't (Mr. Joplin's footmen; also Blib and Blob) – Murray King and Sidney Harcourt
- Peter the Cat – George Hersee
- Bluebell – (a London flower girl) – Ellaline Terriss
- Bluebell's Good Fairy (also The Spirit of the Cup) – Margaret Fraser
- Mab (Bluebell's little sister) – Phyllis Dare
- Winnie (Bluebell's little sister) – Winifred Hall
- The Reigning King and Queen – Stanley Brett and Florence Lloyd
- The Yellow Dwarf – Charles Trevor
- Will o'the Wisp – Dorothy Frostick
- The Water Lily – Gwendoline Brogden
- Flower girls, maids, boot blacks, schoolboys, fairies, etc.
