= The Gay Gordons (musical) =

- Hicks and Terriss in the musical
- Music: Guy Jones
- Lyrics: Arthur Wimperis; C. H. Bovill; Henry Hamilton; P. G. Wodehouse
- Book: Seymour Hicks
- Productions: 1907

The Gay Gordons is a 1907 Edwardian musical comedy with a book by Seymour Hicks, music by Guy Jones and lyrics by Arthur Wimperis, C. H. Bovill, Henry Hamilton and P. G. Wodehouse, who wrote the lyrics to "Now That My Ship's Come Home" and "You, You, You". The title refers to both the Clan Gordon and the famed Scottish regiment the Gordon Highlanders as the plot involves the heir to the clan and a soldier from the regiment.

The original production was produced by Charles Frohman and opened at London's Aldwych Theatre on 11 September 1907. The piece starred Hicks as Angus Graeme, and his wife Ellaline Terriss as Peggy Quainton. William Lugg played Andrew Quainton. Zena Dare played Victoria Siddons, and when the show went on tour, she played Peggy Quainton.

== Synopsis ==
The castle of the Scottish Gordon clan has been leased to a wealthy American, Andrew Quainton, whose daughter is the charming Peggy. Unfortunately, the heir to the clan's chief has been lost, and the castle will eventually have to be ceded to the Crown. Peggy has no interest in joining the British aristocracy and has sworn not to marry a nobleman. She disguises herself as a strolling fortune teller and soon meets a young private in the Gordon Highlanders, Angus Graeme. Angus woos Peggy and gains her affection, and she is delighted to fall in love with the humble Scottish soldier lad. News arrives that the long-lost heir to the Gordon titles and fortune is Angus. He is worried that this might cause Peggy to leave him, so he continues to pretend to be plain Angus until he can figure out a way to tell her that he is really an Earl. Peggy's brother is expected to arrive soon, and Angus intends to involve him in the deception. The plan goes awry, as Peggy impersonates her brother, and Angus tells her the secret. Peggy is annoyed at having been misled, but she is a practical American and loves Angus, so all ends happily.

== Roles and original cast ==
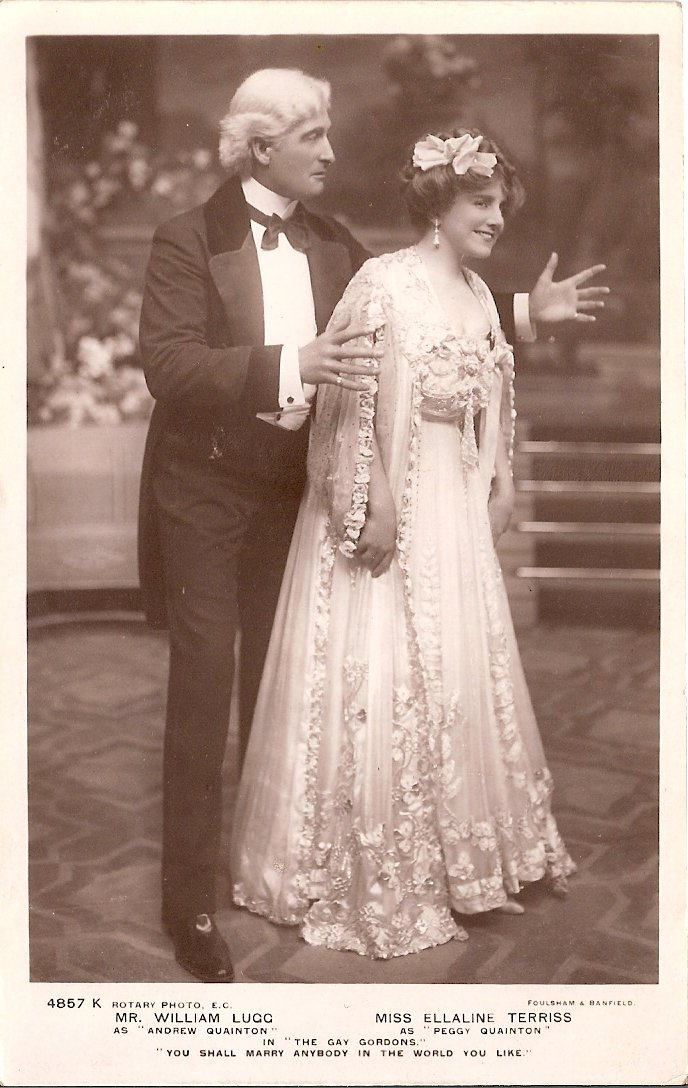
Lugg and Terriss

- Andrew Quainton – William Lugg
- Angus Graeme – Seymour Hicks
- Edmund Siddons – A.W. Baskcomb
- Janet McLeod – Rosina Filippi
- Mary McLeod – Barbara Deane
- Nervy Nat – Fred Emney
- Peggy Quainton – Ellaline Terriss
- Victoria Siddons – Zena Dare
- Charlotte Siddons – Sydney Fairbrother
- The Corporal – Will Bishop

== Reception ==
The reviewer for The New York Times, reviewing the London debut 11 September 1907 wrote:

[T]his latest of London's musical plays differs in no essential particular from its predecessors of Hickian variety. Its best feature is that Ellaine Terriss has a part in which her winsome personality shows to advantage.

The New York Times reviewer praised Hicks's wife, Ellaline Terriss, the costumes and the "effective" use of the show's chorus, and thought that the score had "two excellent songs and a number of fetching dances" but says that dramatic interest lagged after the first act, with the second act being "at times ... very tedious."

Unlike The Catch of the Season and The Earl and the Girl, two Hicks musical comedies that transferred to Broadway in 1905, The Gay Gordons did not make it across the Atlantic, despite its achieving great success in London, but it did play in Australia. Between August 1898 and November 1906, seven Hicks shows had transferred from London to Broadway. No more Seymour Hicks productions were transferred to Broadway thereafter until The Matrimonial Bed in 1927.

== Road show ==
Hicks and his company took the show on the road, playing the Prince's Theatre, Bristol in the 1908–09 season and the Palace Theatre, Watford for three nights in January 1909. Terriss was replaced by Zena Dare as Peggy Quainton on tour.
