= C. H. Bovill =

Bovill during the First World War

Charles Henry Bovill (28 September 1878 – 24 March 1918), professionally known as C. H. Bovill, was an English writer, songwriter and lyricist, known for his collaborations with P. G. Wodehouse, George Grossmith Jr. and others. His career was cut short by the First World War in which he died while serving in the British army in France.

== Life and career ==
Bovill was born at Coonoor, India, the only son of Major Charles Edward Bovill, Royal Inniskilling Fusiliers, and his wife, Ellen Marie. He was educated at Bedford Grammar School, after which he entered the civil service in 1900, serving there until 1912. He married Ethel Rachel Kay at St Augustine's, Fulham on 30 September 1907; they had three sons.

In the early 1900s while still a civil servant, Bovill began writing song lyrics, collaborating with, among other composers, Ernest Shand and Philip Braham. In 1905 his short play Goodbye, Pierrot was given as a curtain raiser in provincial performances. In 1907 he and P. G. Wodehouse contributed lyrics for Seymour Hicks's musical The Gay Gordons. For revues contributed lyrics to George Grossmith Jr.'s Come Inside (1909), and was co-author of Mr Manhattan and Half Past Eight, and was writer of the Theatre Royal, Drury Lane's 1912 pantomime, The Sleeping Beauty.

Among later West End revues of which Bovill was the author were Everybody's Doing It (1912), All the Winners (1913), Nuts and Wine (1914, with contributions from Wodehouse), and Honi Soit (1915). He wrote the words for what was billed as a "vaudeville", The Gay Lothario (1913).

In addition to his theatrical work, Bovill wrote humorous prose for publications including The Globe, where for some time Wodehouse was a colleague. While working on Nuts and Wine they wrote a series of short stories based on Bovill's idea of a young man who comes into a lot of money and finds himself in a succession of adventures. The stories appeared in The Strand Magazine in Britain and The Delineator in the US, and were later published as a book. Other publications for which Bovill wrote short stories included The Grand, Pearson's, The London, and other magazines.

During the First World War, Bovill volunteered for the army and was commissioned as a second lieutenant in the 1st battalion, Coldstream Guards in 1916. He was mortally wounded on 21 March 1918 and died three days later. He was buried in the Duisans British Cemetery, Etrun.

== Sources ==
- Jasen, David A. (1975). P. G. Wodehouse: A Portrait of a Master. London: Garnstone. ISBN 978-0-85511-190-8.
