= William Lugg =

English actor and singer (1852–1939)

Guron (Warwick Gray), Arac (Richard Temple), and Scynthius (Lugg), in Princess Ida, 1884

William Lugg (4 June 1852 – 5 December 1939) was an English actor and singer of the late Victorian and Edwardian eras. He had a long stage career beginning with roles in several Gilbert and Sullivan operas and continuing for over four decades in drama, comedy and musical theatre. Later in his career, he appeared in nine silent films in the early years of British cinema.

== Early life and stage career ==
Lugg was born in Portsea, Portsmouth, Hampshire. A bass singer, his first professional theatrical appearances were with the D'Oyly Carte Opera Company, which he joined in January 1884. With that company, at the Savoy Theatre, he created the small role of Scynthius in the original production of Princess Ida, by Gilbert and Sullivan. Lugg then played in the D'Oyly Carte's first revival of Gilbert and Sullivan's The Sorcerer, as the Notary, and Trial by Jury, as the Usher, from October 1884 to March 1885. After this, he left the company.

Lugg then appeared in small roles in three Arthur Wing Pinero plays at the Royal Court Theatre: The Magistrate, The Schoolmistress and Dandy Dick. He sang the role of Sergeant Bouncer in Cox & Box by F.C. Burnand and Arthur Sullivan, when it was revived at the Royal Court Theatre in 1888. Also in 1888, he appeared at the Olympic Theatre in Christina and at the Strand Theatre in Run Wild, Kleptomania and Aladdin. In 1889 at the Comedy Theatre, he played in Aesop's Fables, The Pink Dominos, Queen's Counsel and Domestic Economy. He was then back at the Strand as Nathaniel Glover in Our Flat. In 1891, he appeared at the Theatre Royal, Drury Lane in A Sailor's Knot.

Lugg then joined the theatre company of William Hunter Kendal and Madge Kendal, where he remained for several years. With the Kendals, among other plays, he appeared in The Queen's Shilling as Colonel Daunt, Clancarty as the Earl of Portland and A Scrap of Paper as Sir John Ingram. After this, at the Lyceum Theatre with Johnston Forbes-Robertson, Lugg played as Polonius in Hamlet and as Duncan in Macbeth. He joined the company of Henry Irving in 1899, where his roles included Benjamin Vaughan in Robespierre, Titus Lartius in Coriolanus, Lambert in The Lyons Mail, Ireton in King Charles I, Franois de Paule in Louis XI, Salanio in The Merchant of Venice, the Witch of the Kitchen in Faust, Ruggieri in Dante and Roger in Tennyson's Becket, among others.

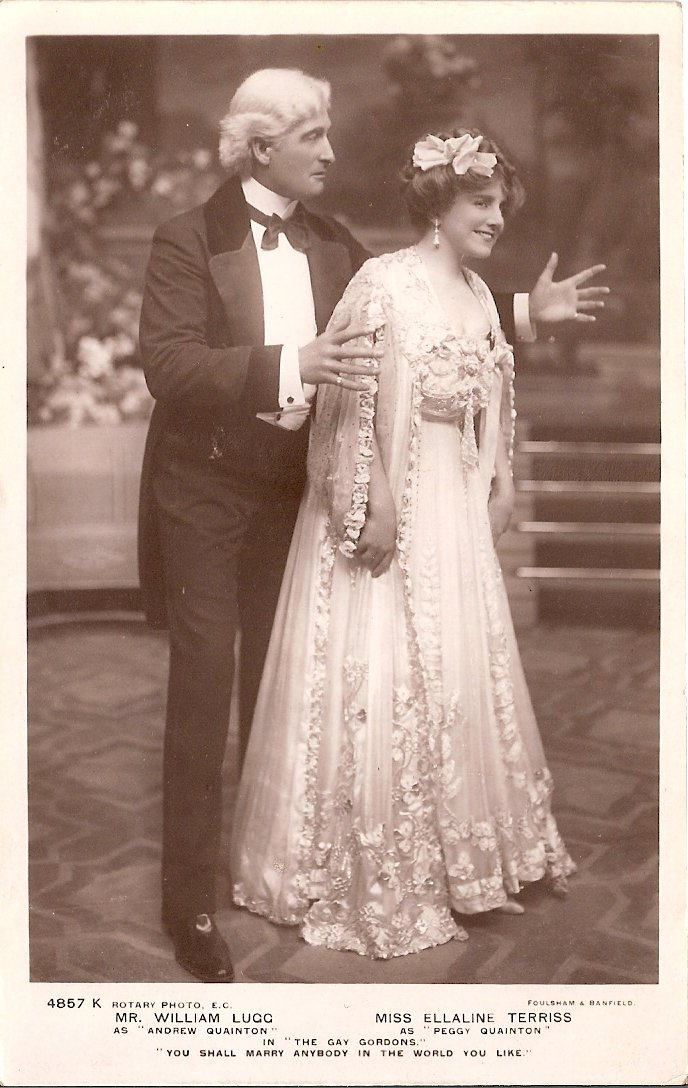
Lugg with Ellaline Terriss in The Gay Gordons (1907)

In 1906, Lugg played the Stranger in The Jury of Fate at the Shaftesbury Theatre. He then joined the company of Seymour Hicks and Ellaline Terriss at the Aldwych Theatre, for whom he played Lord Bellingham in the successful Edwardian musical comedy The Beauty of Bath. In 1907, he appeared with them as Andrew Quainton in The Gay Gordons. In April 1908 he toured with Terriss in Sweet and Twenty. In 1910, he was at the Prince of Wales's Theatre as Count Boethy in another musical, The Balkan Princess.

Lugg then toured with Olga Nethersole in another musical, The Quaker Girl, from 1910 to 1911, and appeared at the Lyceum Theatre in 1912 in The Monk and the Woman, at the Prince's Theatre in Ben-My-Chree, and in 1913 toured again with Nethersole. Returning to the Prince of Wales's Theatre in 1914, he played Peter Pembroke in Broadway Jones, and at the Comedy Theatre in 1915 he was Edouard de Fontaine in Wild Thyme and appeared in On Trial. At the Lyceum in 1915, Lugg appeared in Between Two Women, and at Wyndham's Theatre in 1916, he portrayed the King in A Kiss for Cinderella.

In 1918 at the Lyceum, he appeared as Colonel Hilderbrand in The Story of the Rosary, and the same year, he was the Comte de Belleville in Soldier Boy at the Apollo Theatre. The next year, he was Mr. Sysonby in The Bird of Paradise at the Lyric Theatre, and Father Thibant in Tiger Rose at the Savoy Theatre. In 1920, he played the Clergyman in The Truth About the Russian Dancers at the Coliseum, and at the Aldwych Theatre in November 1920 he again played Duncan in Macbeth.

In 1921 Lugg appeared as the Comte de Courson in The Legion of Honour by Baroness Orczy, adapted from her novel A Sheaf of Bluebells, at the Aldwych Theatre with a young Claude Rains. At the Royalty Theatre in 1922 he played Simeon Ristitch in Mr. Budd (of Kennington), and at the Lyceum in 1924 he was Father Pius in Under His Protection. His last known stage performance was at the Gaiety Theatre in 1924, as Judge Delafield, J.P., in Poppy.

== Film career and last years ==
From 1913 to 1923, Lugg appeared in nine films, including Scrooge (1913) and as Simon Ingot in David Garrick (1913), both of which he appeared in with Seymour Hicks and Ellaline Terriss. His other film roles were Andrew Vernon in Daddy (1917), Sir John Haviland in Ave Maria (1918), Grandfather in The Old Curiosity Shop (1921), Down Under Donovan (1922), Soames in The Three Students (1923), Baron de Clifford in The Mistletoe Bough (1923), and John of Oxford in Becket (1923).

Lugg and his wife Ellen Florence, née Smith, had a son, Alfred (born 1889), who also became an actor. Lugg retired in 1927 and died in Norwood, London, aged 87.
