= Glamour (1931 film) =

1931 film

- Directed by: Harry Hughes
- Written by: Harry Hughes
- Produced by: Harry Hughes
- Starring: Seymour Hicks; Ellaline Terriss; Margot Grahame
- Cinematography: Jack E. Cox
- Production company: British International Pictures
- Distributed by: Wardour Films
- Release date: 5 June 1931
- Running time: 73 minutes
- Country: United Kingdom
- Language: English

Glamour is a 1931 British drama film directed by Seymour Hicks and Harry Hughes and starring Hicks, Ellaline Terriss and Margot Grahame. A young, ruthless woman falls in love with a rising actor. It was loosely remade for the 1934 American film Glamour. There are currently no known surviving copies of the original film.

== Cast ==
- Seymour Hicks as Henry Garthome
- Ellaline Terriss as Lady Belton
- Margot Grahame as Lady Betty Enfield
- Basil Gill as Lord Westborough
- A. Bromley Davenport as Lord Belton
- Beverley Nichols as Hon. Richard Wells
- Betty Hicks as Lady Armadale
- Clifford Heatherley as Edward Crumbles
- Naomi Jacob as Rosalind Crumbles
- David Hawthorne as Charlie Drummond
- Philip Hewland as Millett
- Arthur Stratton as Fireman
- Charles Paton as Clockwinder
- Margery Binner as Reede
- Eric Marshall as Singer

== Bibliography ==
- Low, Rachael. Filmmaking in 1930s Britain. George Allen & Unwin, 1985.
- Wood, Linda. British Films, 1927-1939. British Film Institute, 1986.
