= Vaudeville Theatre =

West End theatre in London

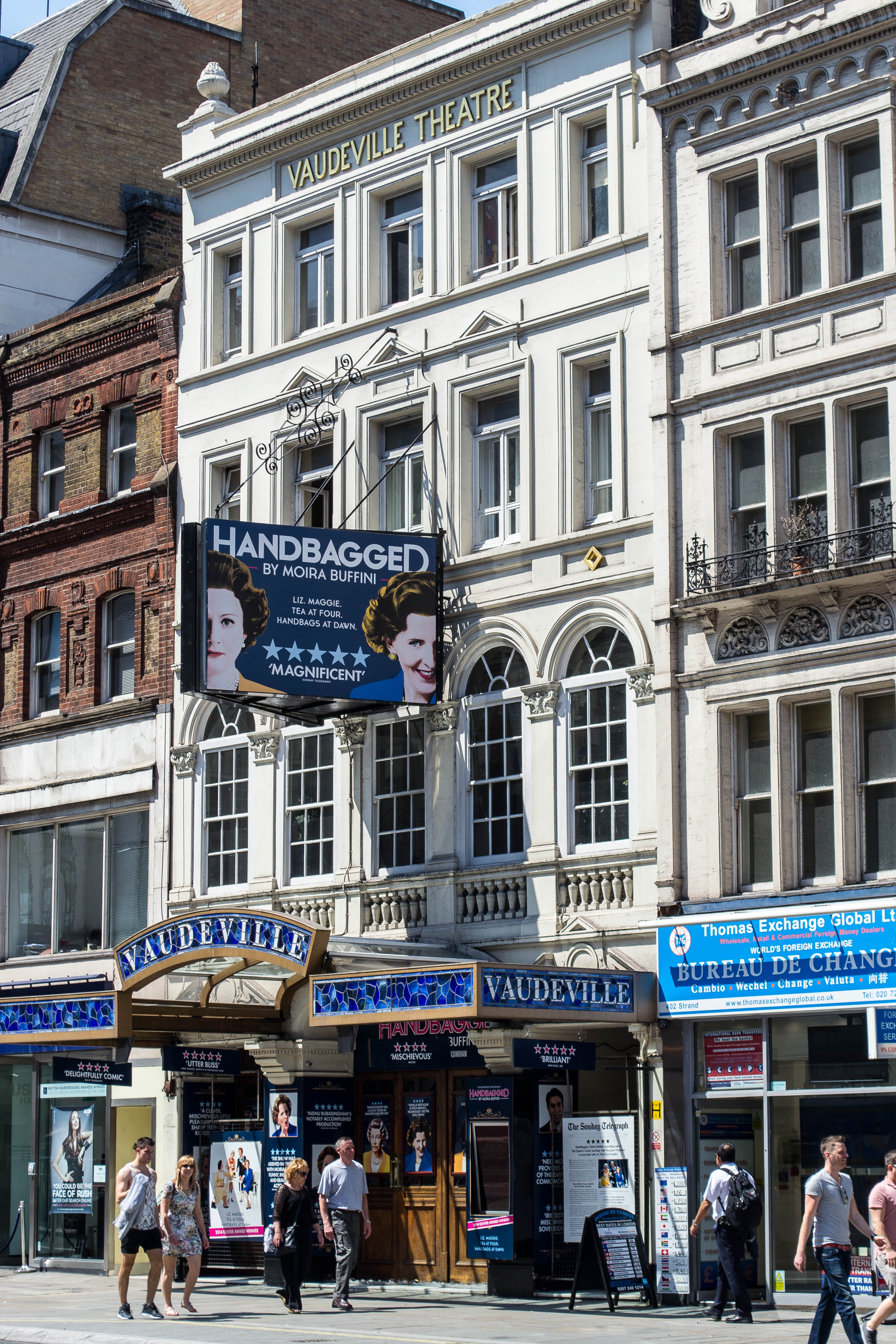
- The Vaudeville Theatre in 2014
- Interactive map of Vaudeville Theatre
- Address: Strand; London, WC2; United Kingdom
- Coordinates: 51.510556°N 0.1225°W
- Owner: Nimax Theatres
- Capacity: 690 on 3 levels
- Type: West End theatre
- Designation: Grade II
- Production: Six
- Public transit: Charing Cross; Charing Cross

Construction
- Opened: 16 April 1870; 156 years ago
- Rebuilt: 1882 (C. J. Phipps); 1926 (Robert Atkinson)
- Architect: C. J. Phipps

Website
- www.nimaxtheatres.com/nimax/vaudeville

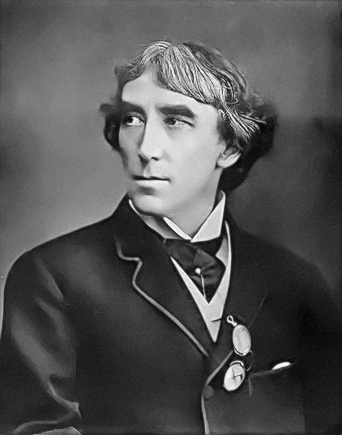
Henry Irving

The Vaudeville Theatre is a West End theatre on the Strand in the City of Westminster. Opening in 1870, the theatre staged mostly vaudeville shows and musical revues in its early days. The theatre was rebuilt twice, although each new building retained elements of the previous structure. The current building dates from 1926, and the capacity is now 690 seats. Early stage mechanisms, including rare thunder drums and lightning sheets, survive in the theatre.

== History ==
=== Origins ===
The theatre was designed by prolific architect C. J. Phipps, and decorated in a Romanesque style by George Gordon. It opened on 16 April 1870 with Andrew Halliday's comedy, For Love Or Money and a burlesque, Don Carlos or the Infante in Arms. A notable innovation was the concealed footlights, which would shut off if the glass in front of them was broken. The owner, William Wybrow Robertson, had run a failing billiard hall on the site but saw more opportunity in theatre. He leased the new theatre to three actors, Thomas Thorne, David James, and H.J. Montague. The original theatre stood behind two houses on the Strand, and the entrance was through a labyrinth of small corridors. It had a seating capacity of 1,046, rising in a horseshoe over a pit and three galleries. The cramped site meant that facilities front and backstage were limited.

The Shakespearean actor, Henry Irving, had his first conspicuous success as Digby Grant in James Albery's Two Roses at the Vaudeville in 1870. It held the theatre for what was at the time a successful run of 300 nights. The first theatre piece in the world to achieve 500 consecutive performances was the comedy Our Boys by H. J. Byron, which started its run at the Vaudeville in 1875. The production went on to surpass the 1,000 performance mark. This was such a rare event that London bus conductors approaching the Vaudeville Theatre stop shouted "Our Boys!" instead of the name of the theatre.

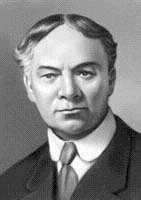
Jerome K. Jerome

In 1882, Thomas Thorne became the sole lessee, and in 1889 he demolished the houses to create a foyer block in the Adamesque style, behind a Portland stone facade on the Strand. He again used architect C.J. Phipps. The theatre was refurbished to have more spacious seating and an ornate ceiling. It reopened on 13 January 1891 with a performance of Jerome K. Jerome's comedy, Woodbarrow Farm, preceded by Herbert Keith's one-act play The Note of Hand. This foyer is preserved today, as is the four-storey frontage. Dramatist W. S. Gilbert presented one of his later plays here, Rosencrantz and Guildenstern (1891), a burlesque "in Three Short 'Tableaux'". (He had published it in 1874 in Fun magazine). Also in 1891, Elizabeth Robins and Marion Lea directed and starred in Ibsen's Hedda Gabler at the theatre, and his Rosmersholm had its London premiere here.

=== Gatti family ===
In 1892, Thorne passed the lease to restaurateurs Agostino and Stefano Gatti, who since 1878 had held the lease of the nearby Adelphi Theatre. The first production at the new theatre was a revival of Our Boys. The lease briefly passed into the hands of Weedon Grossmith in 1894, but was back with the Gattis in 1896. The theatre became known for a series of successful musical comedies. The French Maid, by Basil Hood, with music by Walter Slaughter, first played in London at Terry's Theatre under the management of W.H. Griffiths beginning in 1897 but transferred to the Vaudeville in early 1898, running for a very successful total of 480 London performances. The piece starred Louie Pounds. Seymour Hicks and his wife Ellaline Terriss starred in a series of Christmas entertainments here, including their popular Bluebell in Fairyland (1901). The foyer of the theatre had become infamous as the site of an argument in 1897 between Richard Archer Prince and Terriss's father, actor William Terriss. Soon after that argument, the deranged Prince stabbed William Terriss to death at the stage door of the Adelphi Theatre. Prince was a struggling young actor whom Terriss had tried to help.

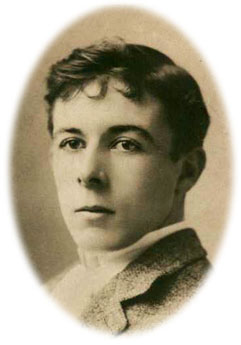
Seymour Hicks

Hicks and Terriss also starred here in Quality Street, a comedy by J. M. Barrie, which opened at the Vaudeville in 1902 and ran for 459 performances. It had first played in New York in 1901 but ran there for only 64 performances. This was one of the first American productions to score a bigger triumph in London. This was followed by the 1903 musical The Cherry Girl by Hicks, with music by Ivan Caryll, starring Hicks, Terriss and Courtice Pounds. In 1904, Hicks scored an even bigger hit with the musical, The Catch of the Season, written by Hicks and Cosmo Hamilton, based on the fairy tale Cinderella. It had a very long run of 621 performances, starring Hicks, Zena Dare (who created the role of Angela when Ellaline Terriss's pregnancy forced her to withdraw. Dare was later replaced by Terriss and then by Dare's sister, Phyllis Dare) and Louie Pounds.

John Maria and Rocco Gatti took over management of the Vaudeville in 1905. In 1906, the theatre hosted the very successful The Belle of Mayfair, a musical composed by Leslie Stuart with a book by Basil Hood, Charles Brookfield and Cosmo Hamilton, produced by Hicks' partner, Charles Frohman. It ran for 431 performances and starred Edna May, Louie and her brother Courtice Pounds, and Camille Clifford. In 1910, an English adaptation of The Girl in the Train (Die geschiedene Frau – literally, "The Divorcee"), a 1908 Viennese operetta by Leo Fall, opened at the Vaudeville. It was produced by George Edwardes, with lyrics by Adrian Ross and starred Robert Evett, Phyllis Dare and Rutland Barrington. In 1911, William Greet produced Baby Mine at the theatre. Betty Bolton made her debut in 1916, at the age of 10, in a revue called Some, at the theatre. During and after World War I, audiences sought light entertainment, and musical revues held the Vaudeville stage, including Cheep (1917), the long-running Just Fancy (1920) and Rats (1923), another popular revue. Albert Ketèlbey was one of the theatre's music directors.

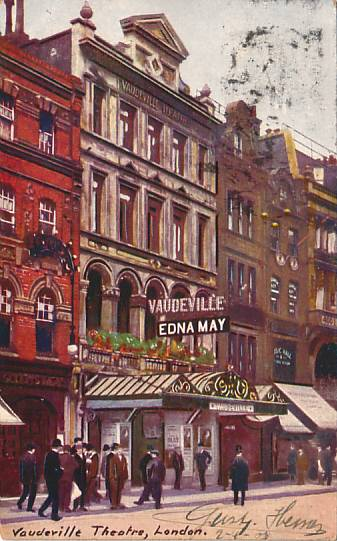
Postcard of the Vaudeville Theatre, c. 1905

The theatre closed on 7 November 1925, when the interior was completely reconstructed to designs by Robert Atkinson. The auditorium was changed from a horseshoe shape to the current rectangle shape, and the seating capacity reduced to just over 700. A new dressing room block with an ornate boardroom extended the site to Maiden Lane. The theatre reopened on 23 February 1926, with a popular revue by Archie de Bear called R.S.V.P., notable because its final rehearsal was broadcast by the BBC. The theatre then hosted William Somerset Maugham's comedy, The Bread-Winner in 1930. After World War II, the theatre presented William Douglas Home's play, The Chiltern Hundreds, which ran for 651 performances. The record-setting musical Salad Days, composed by Julian Slade with lyrics by Dorothy Reynolds and Slade, premiered at the Bristol Old Vic in 1954 but soon transferred to the Vaudeville, enjoying the longest run of any theatrical work up to that point in history. Another notable production at the theatre was Arnold Wesker's 1959 play, Chips with Everything.

=== Modern era ===
A proposed redevelopment of Covent Garden by the GLC in 1968 saw the theatre under threat, together with the nearby Adelphi, Garrick, Lyceum and Duchess theatres. An active campaign by Equity, the Musicians' Union and theatre owners under the auspices of the Save London Theatres Campaign led to the abandonment of the scheme.

Cicely Courtneidge played at the theatre in The Bride Comes Back (1960) and Ray Cooney's Move Over Mrs. Markham (1971). Bill Treacher made his West End debut in 1963 in the comedy Shout for Life at the Vaudeville. In 1966, the theatre hosted Arsenic and Old Lace, starring Sybil Thorndike and her husband Lewis Casson. Brigid Brophy's The Burglar premiered at the theatre in 1967, and Joyce Rayburn's comedy, The Man Most Likely To..., starring Leslie Phillips, opened initially at the Vaudeville in 1968 and went on to run for over 1,000 performances in London.

In 1969, the Gatti family sold their interest in the theatre to Sir Peter Saunders, and in 1970 he commissioned Peter Rice to redesign the interior. Among other changes were a deep red wallpaper in the auditorium and more comfortable seats. Also, the loggia above the street was glazed to make the balcony an extension of the bar. The backstage lighting was rerigged, and a forestage lift and counterweight flying system were installed. The theatre achieved some protection in 1972 when it was Grade II listed. In 1983, ownership passed to Michael Codron and David Sutton. Stephen Waley-Cohen took ownership in 1996, passing it to Max Weitzenhofer in 2002.

Meanwhile, drama was added to the standard bill of fare at the theatre. Hugh Paddick starred in the Joyce Rayburn farce Out on a Limb at the theatre in 1976, Noël Coward's Present Laughter with Donald Sinden in the lead was revived in 1981 and Patrick Cargill and Moira Lister co-starred in the farce Key for Two in 1982. Noël Coward's Blithe Spirit was revived at the theatre in 1986, and Willy Russell's play Shirley Valentine played in 1988, starring Pauline Collins. In 1990, Simon Gray's play Hidden Laughter was produced at the theatre, followed by Kander and Ebb's 1991 musical, 70, Girls, 70, starring Dora Bryan.

A 1996 revival of Salad Days, starring the duo Kit and The Widow, was not successful, but Jean Fergusson's show She Knows You Know!, in which she portrayed the Lancashire comedian Hylda Baker, played at the theatre in 1997 and was nominated for a 1998 Laurence Olivier Award for Best Entertainment. Showtune, a musical revue celebrating the words and music of composer Jerry Herman and conceived by Paul Gilger was given a London production at the Vaudeville in 1998 under its previous title The Best of Times. That same year the theatre housed Kat and the Kings, which won the Olivier for Best New Musical and, in an unusual move, Best Actor in a Musical for its entire cast. Madame Melville, a play by Richard Nelson was presented in 2000. It marked the return of Macaulay Culkin to acting after a six-year hiatus and also starred Irène Jacob and Madeleine Potter. In 2001 Ray Cooney's farce Caught in the Net, starring Russ Abbot and Eric Sykes, had a ten-month run.

The dance/performance art troupe Stomp was in residence at the theatre from 2002 to 2007. Since 2003, the theatre has been owned by Max Weitzenhofer, and in 2005, the venue was brought under the management of Nimax Theatres Limited.

== Productions ==
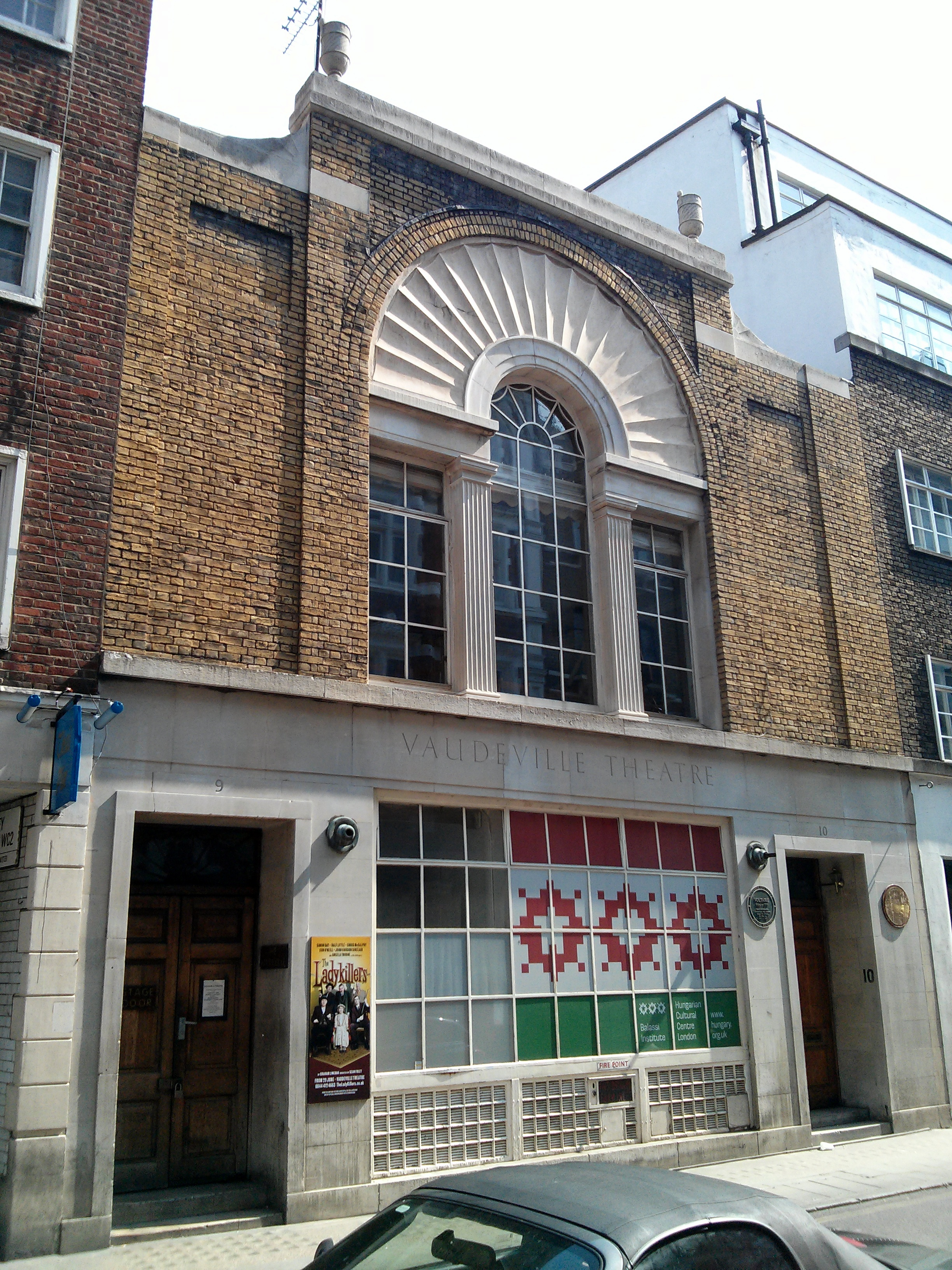
The rear premises of the Vaudeville Theatre, designed in 1925–1926 by Robert Atkinson

- Swimming with Sharks (16 October 2007 – 19 January 2008) starring Christian Slater
- The Importance of Being Earnest (22 January 2008 – 26 April 2008) starring Penelope Keith
- The Deep Blue Sea (29 April 2008 – 5 July 2008) starring Greta Scacchi
- The Female of the Species (16 July 2008 – 4 October 2008) starring Eileen Atkins and Anna Maxwell Martin
- Piaf (14 October 2008 – 24 January 2009) starring Elena Roger
- Woman in Mind (6 February 2009 – 2 May 2009) starring Janie Dee
- Duet for One (12 May 2009 – 1 August 2009) starring Juliet Stevenson and Henry Goodman
- Alan Cumming: I Bought a Blue Car Today (1 September 2009 – 6 September 2009) starring Alan Cumming
- Ed Byrne: Different Class (7 September 2009 – 19 September 2009) starring Ed Byrne
- The Rise and Fall of Little Voice (20 October 2009 – 30 January 2010) starring Diana Vickers, Lesley Sharp and Marc Warren
- Marcus Brigstocke – God Collar (4 February 2010 – 10 February 2010) starring Marcus Brigstocke
- Megan Mullally & Supreme Music Programme (16–21 February 2010) starring Megan Mullally
- Private Lives (3 March 2010 – 1 May 2010) starring Kim Cattrall and Matthew Macfadyen
- The Prisoner of Second Avenue (30 June 2010 – 11 September 2010) starring Jeff Goldblum and Mercedes Ruehl
- Pam Ann – Flying High (29 September 2010 – 17 October 2010), starring Pam Ann
- An Ideal Husband (4 November 2010 – 19 February 2011) starring Alexander Hanson and Samantha Bond
- In a Forest, Dark and Deep (3 March 2011 – 4 June 2011) starring Matthew Fox and Olivia Williams
- The Flying Karamazov Brothers (9 June 2011 – 20 August 2011)
- Broken Glass (16 September 2011 – 10 December 2011) starring Antony Sher and Tara Fitzgerald
- Swallows and Amazons (20 December 2011 – 14 January 2012)
- Master Class (7 February 2012 – 28 April 2012) starring Tyne Daly
- What the Butler Saw (16 May 2012 – 28 July 2012) starring Omid Djalili
- Volcano (16 August 2012 – 29 September 2012) starring Jenny Seagrove
- Paul Merton – Out of My Head (1 October 2012 – 12 October 2012) starring Paul Merton
- Uncle Vanya (2 November 2012 – 26 January 2013) starring Ken Stott, Anna Friel and Samuel West
- Great Expectations (6 February 2013 – 30 March 2013) starring Paula Wilcox
- The West End Men (25 May 2013 – 22 June 2013) starring Lee Mead, David Thaxton, Matt Willis, Glenn Carter and Stephen Rahman-Hughes
- The Ladykillers (29 June 2013 – 26 October 2013)
- The Duck House (27 November 2013 – 29 March 2014) starring Ben Miller
- Handbagged (10 April 2014 – 2 August 2014) starring Marion Bailey, Stella Gonet and Fenella Woolgar
- Forbidden Broadway (15 September 2014 – 22 November 2014)
- The Wind in the Willows (26 November 2014 – 17 January 2015)
- Di and Viv and Rose (29 January 2015 – 14 March 2015) starring Tamzin Outhwaite, Samantha Spiro and Jenna Russell
- Oppenheimer (31 March 2015 – 23 May 2015)
- Just Jim Dale (28 May 2015 – 20 June 2015) starring Jim Dale
- The Importance of Being Earnest (1 July 2015 – 4 November 2015) starring David Suchet
- Bill Bailey: Limbo Land (10 December 2015 – 17 January 2016) starring Bill Bailey
- Hand to God (15 February 2016 – 30 April 2016) starring Janie Dee and Neil Pearson
- Hobson's Choice (14 June 2016 – 10 September 2016) starring Martin Shaw
- My Family: Not the Sitcom (15 September 2016 – 15 October 2016) starring David Baddiel
- Dead Funny (3 November 2016 – 4 February 2017) starring Steve Pemberton, Ralf Little and Katherine Parkinson
- The Boys in the Band (7 February 2017 – 18 February 2017) starring Mark Gatiss, Ian Hallard and Daniel Boys
- Stepping Out (14 March 2017 – 17 June 2017) starring Amanda Holden, Natalie Casey, Anna-Jane Casey and Tracy-Ann Oberman
- The Mentor (4 July 2017 – 2 September 2017) starring F. Murray Abraham
- True West (23 November 2018 – 23 February 2019) starring Kit Harington and Johnny Flynn
- Emilia (21 March 2019 – 15 June 2019)
- The Worst Witch (24 July 2019 – 8 September 2019)
- Six (29 September 2021 - booking until November 2027) music and lyrics by Toby Marlow and Lucy Moss

=== The Michael Grandage Company ===
- 30 Million Minutes (12 November 2015 – 5 December 2015) starring Dawn French

=== Classic Spring Company ===
- A Woman of No Importance (16 October 2017 – 30 December 2017) starring Eve Best and Anne Reid
- Lady Windermere's Fan (22 January 2018 – 7 April 2018) starring Samantha Spiro, Kevin Bishop and Jennifer Saunders
- An Ideal Husband (3 May 2018 – 14 July 2018) starring Edward Fox, Freddie Fox, Nathaniel Parker, Frances Barber, Sally Bretton and Susan Hampshire
- The Importance of Being Earnest (2 August 2018 – 20 October 2018) starring Sophie Thompson, Jeremy Swift, Stella Gonet, Fiona Button and Pippa Nixon

=== Mischief Theatre ===
- Groan Ups (20 September – 1 December 2019)
- Magic Goes Wrong (8 January – 15 March 2020)

=== Donmar West End ===
- Constellations (18 June 2021 – 12 September 2021) starring Sheila Atim and Ivanno Jeremiah (18 June – 1 August), Peter Capaldi and Zoë Wanamaker (23 June – 24 July), Omari Douglas and Russell Tovey (30 July – 11 September), and Anna Maxwell Martin and Chris O’Dowd (6 August – 12 September)

== Nearby tube stations ==
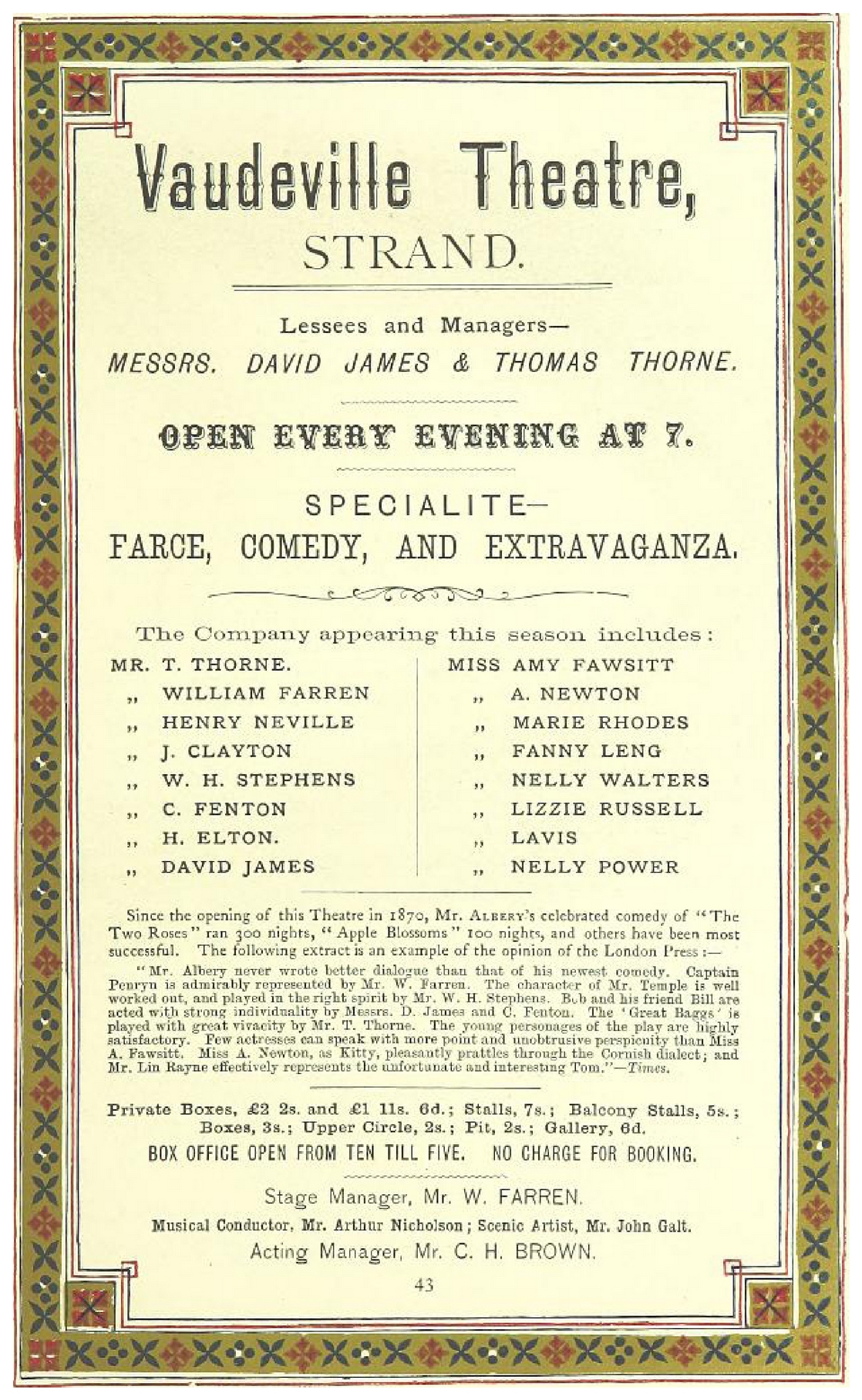
London Illustrated Almanac of 1872

- Charing Cross
- Embankment
- Covent Garden
