= Daddy (1917 film) =

1917 British film by Thomas Bentley

- Directed by: Thomas Bentley
- Written by: Kenelm Foss; Reuben Gillmer; H. Hurlock
- Starring: Langhorn Burton; Peggy Kurton; William Lugg
- Production company: British Actors Film Company
- Distributed by: International Exclusives
- Release date: July 1917
- Country: United Kingdom
- Language: English

Daddy is a 1917 British silent drama film directed by Thomas Bentley and starring Langhorn Burton, Peggy Kurton and William Lugg. After his musician dies his young son goes to live with a violin manufacturer falling in his love with his daughter as he grows up.

== Cast ==
- Langhorn Burton as John Melsher
- Peggy Kurton as Elsie Vernon
- William Lugg as Andrew Vernon
- M. R. Morand as John Melsher
- Charles Macdona as Farmer Bruff
- Eric Barker as John, as a child
- Audrey Hughes as Elsie, as a child

== Bibliography ==
- Low, Rachael. History of the British Film, 1914-1918. Routledge, 2005.
