= The Circus Girl =

Edwardian musical comedy composed by Ivan Caryll

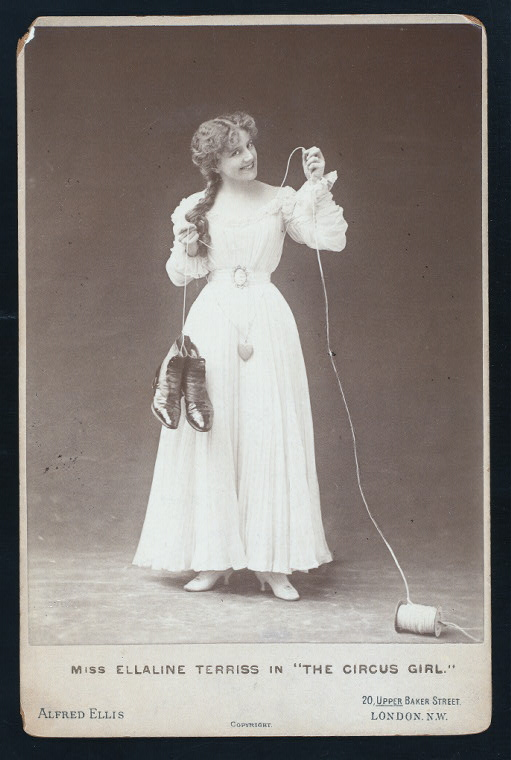
- Ellaline Terriss as Dora
- Music: Ivan Caryll; Lionel Monckton
- Lyrics: Harry Greenbank; Adrian Ross
- Book: James T. Tanner; Walter Apllant (Palings)
- Productions: 1896 West End; 1897 Broadway

The Circus Girl is a Edwardian musical comedy in two acts with a book by James T. Tanner and Walter Apllant (Palings), lyrics by Harry Greenbank and Adrian Ross, music by Ivan Caryll, and additional music by Lionel Monckton.

The musical was produced at George Edwardes's Gaiety Theatre, beginning 5 December 1896, and ran for a very successful 497 performances. It starred Seymour Hicks as Dick Capel and his wife Ellaline Terriss as Dora Wemyss. Edmund Payne and Arthur Williams also appeared. The show also had a successful New York run at two theatres in 1897 for a total of 172 performances. It was produced by Charles Frohman. Mabelle Gilman Corey played Lucille and Nancy McIntosh played La Favorita in New York.

Set in Paris, the plot concerns a group of English tourists who get mixed up with a circus troupe. Two of the famous songs from the show are "A Simple Little String" and "The Way to Treat a Lady".

== Background ==
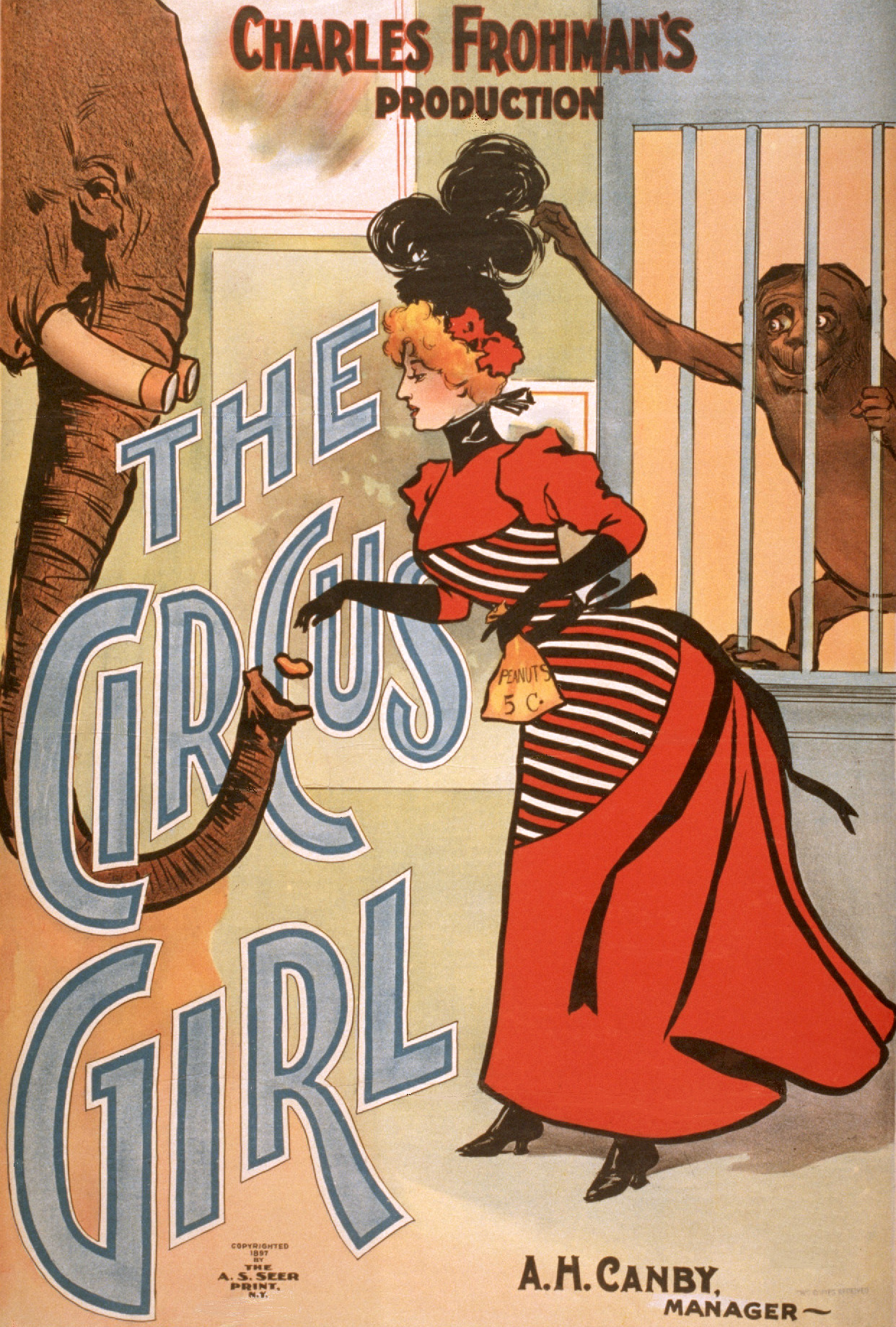
Poster for the New York production

Ellaline Terriss wrote:

One night Sir Arthur Sullivan came to see The Circus Girl and was good enough to come round after the play to my dressing-room. I was a little afraid that he might be contemptuous of our gay, light-hearted trifle, but no, not at all, he said he had been delighted with everything, the comedy, the charm, the setting – it is true that the play was beautifully mounted. Edwardes had caught the atmosphere of the circus ring and the last scene, "The Artists' Ball," was one of the finest The Guv'nor had ever staged. It got rounds of applause when the curtain went up, at every performance. Sullivan was loud in his praises of the music, too – there was no criticism from him. And he expressed great pleasure in my own performance, going so far as to say that he hoped I would be able to create a part in one of his next works.

Later during the London production, Terriss's father, actor William Terriss, was murdered outside the Adelphi Theatre in London, creating a sensation in the press and an outpouring of sympathy for Terriss and Hicks.

== Synopsis ==
Dick Capel, an understudy who occasionally performed at a Paris circus as "The Cannon King", impressed pretty Dora Wemyss, a school girl. Dick, however, is engaged to be married. Dora's father, Sir Titus, an English tourist, has been hiding in the cannon and has been flirting with the circus girls; he is avoiding his wife. Dick shoots Sir Titus out of the cannon. Meanwhile, Bugs, a silly American bartender, agrees to fight a celebrated wrestler, The Terrible Turk, in order to win over Lucille, the girl who walks the slackwire. La Favorita is a bareback rider.

== Roles and original cast ==
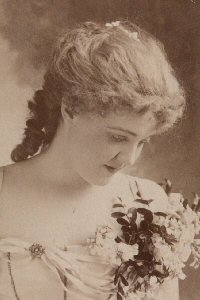
Nancy McIntosh as La Favorita (New York cast)

- Sir Titus Wemyss – Harry Monkhouse
- Dick Capel – Seymour Hicks
- Drivelli (proprietor of circus) – Arthur Williams
- Hon. Reginald Gower – Lionel Mackinder
- Auguste (a clown) – Willie Warde
- Adolphe (a clown) – Bertie Wright
- Albertoni (ring master) – Colin Coop
- Commissaire of Police – Robert Nainby
- Vicomte Gaston – Maurice Farkoa
- Toothick Pasha (the Terrible Turk) – Arthur Hope
- Rudolph (the Cannon King) – E. D. Wardes
- Proprietor of Cafe de la Regence – Leslie Holland
- Flobert and Cocher – Robert Selby and W. F. Brooke
- Sergent de Ville – Fred Ring
- Valliand – W. H. Powell
- Biggs (an American bar tender) – Edmund Payne
- Lucille (a slack wire walker) – Katie Seymour
- La Favorita – Ethel Haydon
- Mme. Drivelli – Connie Ediss
- Lady Diana Wemyss (Sir Titus's wife) – Marie Davis
- Marie, Louise, Liane, Emilie and Juliette – Grace Palotta, Lily Johnston, Louie Coote, Alice Betelle and Maidie Hope
- Comptesse d'Épernay – Ada Maitland
- Marquise de Millefleurs – Kathleen Francis
- Mdlle. Gompson – Alice Neilson
- Dora Wemyss (Sir Titus's daughter) – Ellaline Terriss

== Musical numbers ==
Act I

- No. 1 - Chorus - "We're taking advantage"
- No. 2 - Biggs and Chorus - "Supposing you should suffe."
- No. 3 - Dick, Reggie, and Biggs - "Oh, I am in love"
- No. 4 - Chorus and Drivelli - "What is this attraction" and "The Uses of Advertisement"
- No. 5 - La Favorita - "What queen holds prouder sway"
- No. 6 - Lucille and Biggs - "If the combat you win"
- No. 7 - Dora - "In the dreary days of school"
- No. 8 - Dora and Dick - "The charms of a circus"
- No. 9 - Gaston and Chorus - "When strolling down a boulevard"
- No. 10 - Dick and Chorus - "When you rise at early dawn"
- No. 11 - Finale - Act I - "With feet ever moving"

Act II

- No. 12 - Chorus - "In eager expectation"
- No. 13 - Albertoni and Chorus - "If you really wish to hear"
- No. 14 - La Favorita and Chorus - "A life to be envied by all"
- No. 15 - Dick - "There was once a little maiden"
- No. 16 - Chorus - "When pretty cheeks are all aglow"
- No. 17 - Gaston and Chorus - "Now, comrades, have a glass with me"
- No. 18 - Dora - "I was a little baby"
- No. 19 - Lucille and Biggs - "Pets of the circus ring"
- No. 20 - Mrs. Drivelli and Chorus - "I think that it's behaving very shabby"
- No. 21 - Dance des Polichinelles
- No. 22 - Finale - Act II - "As round the ring"
