= Charles H. Taylor (lyricist) =

British lyricist (1859–1907)

Charles Henry Taylor (21 July 1859 – 27 June 1907) was a British lyricist, best known for his lyrics for early-20th-century West End musical comedies and a comic opera, Tom Jones.

== Life and career ==
Charles H. Taylor was born in Manchester, the son of a silk merchant. He followed his father into the trade and remained there until his late thirties. His friend Robert Courtneidge was a producer at a local theatre, and Taylor supplied some topical lyrics for a pantomime production there. This eventually led to continued contributions of lyrics, and so Taylor quit the silk business to begin writing lyrics full-time for popular music.

After writing the lyrics for his first production for London's West End, The Silver Slipper, Taylor became a popular lyricist. He supplied lyrics for Seymour Hicks's Bluebell in Fairyland (1901), which became the most successful children's entertainment of the era and was revived annually for the next four decades. During the next few years, he contributed lyrics to Sidney Jones's comedy opera My Lady Molly (1902), George Edwardes's production of The Girl from Kays, The Medal and the Maid (1903), and Leslie Stuart's The School Girl (1903). After the success of Bluebell in Fairyland, the Seymour Hicks/Charles Frohman organisation hired him as its chief lyricist. From 1904 to 1907 he supplied the lyrics to the four shows that the team wrote and produced with music by Herbert Haines. The Catch of the Season (1904) and The Beauty of Bath (1906) were particularly successful.

His last work, Tom Jones, was a collaboration with Courtneidge, who had co-written an opera libretto adaptation of Henry Fielding's novel The History of Tom Jones, a Foundling. Taylor supplied the lyrics, and Edward German wrote the music. Some of the songs such as "For Tonight" (sometimes recorded as "The Tom Jones Waltz"), "The Green Ribbon", and "The West Country Lad" proved to be some of the most popular of Taylor's and German's work. The work eventually became popular among amateur light opera groups.

Taylor died at the age of 47 while working on his first musical comedy libretto. A song from that work, "Dream 'o Day Jill", became a special addition to Tom Jones to celebrate the 100th night of its run.
