= Scrooge (1913 film) =

1913 film by Leedham Bantock

Scrooge is a 1913 British black and white silent film based on the 1843 novella A Christmas Carol by Charles Dickens. It stars Seymour Hicks as Ebenezer Scrooge. In the United States it was released in 1926 as Old Scrooge. It was directed by Leedham Bantock.

The film's cast included Seymour Hicks as Scrooge, William Lugg, Leedham Bantock, J. C. Buckstone, Dorothy Buckstone, Leonard Calvert, Osborne Adair, Adela Measor and Ellaline Terriss. Hicks had played the role of Scrooge regularly onstage since 1901 before this, his first appearance in the role in film. He reprised the role of Scrooge again, in the 1935 film Scrooge.

Scrooge was a Zenith Film Company production, by whom it was also distributed on its release date in September 1913. Some scenes in the black and white 35mm film were colour toned.

== Plot ==
The opening credits are followed by a scene in which Charles Dickens is seen pacing his library seeking inspiration for a new story. It comes to him and he settles down to write A Christmas Carol. A short introductory synopsis describing miserly London businessman Ebenezer Scrooge leads into a shot of his nephew Fred Wyland giving money to poor children on Christmas Eve. Scrooge, upon leaving his office, is chased by poor children. At the office, Scrooge's clerk Bob Cratchit bids goodbye to his crippled son Tiny Tim and goes to work. A poor woman comes to the office to beg from Scrooge but he turns her away. Cratchit gives her money. At Middlemarks, the poor line up for food. When the food runs out, Middlemark goes to Scrooge for assistance but he is turned away. Scrooge gives Cratchit a second hand quill as a Christmas present and after Cratchit has gone, he settles down with his money to sleep.

Scrooge is visited on Christmas Eve by the ghost of his dead business partner, Jacob Marley, trying to show Scrooge the error of his ways. As the night wears on, Scrooge is shown in sequence his childhood sweetheart, Cratchit's Christmas, a vision of the death of Cratchit's crippled son Tim, and his own lonely tombstone. Scrooge wakes and realising the error of his ways, throws money from his window to the poor children and sends a boy for a large turkey for Cratchit and then goes to visit them for lunch.

== See also ==
- List of Christmas films
- List of ghost films
- Adaptations of A Christmas Carol
