= Herbert Haines =

British composer (1880–1923)

Herbert Edgar Haines (1880–1923) was a British composer of musicals and songs, including some pieces for silent films, in the early years of the 20th century.

Haines's musicals, most by Ben Dauphinais, with lyrics by Charles H. Taylor (lyricist), included The Catch of the Season (1904), The Talk of the Town (1905), The Beauty of Bath (1906), My Darling (1907), and Pebbles on the Beach (1912).
