= The Cherry Girl =

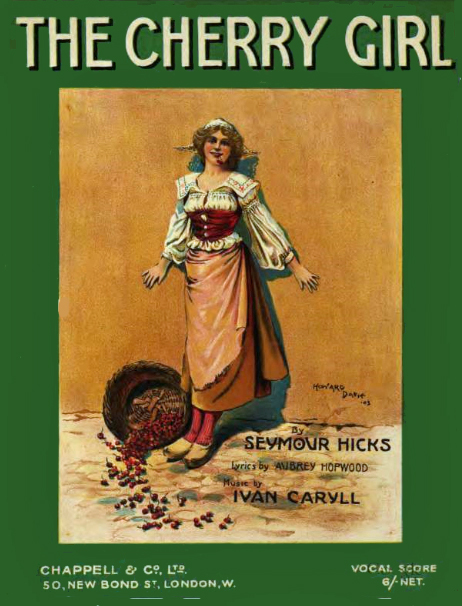
Cover of vocal score of The Cherry Girl, 1903

The Cherry Girl was an Edwardian musical comedy in two acts based on a book by Seymour Hicks with lyrics by Aubrey Hopwood and music by Ivan Caryll. It opened at the Vaudeville Theatre in London's West End on 21 December 1903. The original cast included Hicks, Constance Hyem, Courtice Pounds and Hicks's wife, Ellaline Terriss. From August 1904, the play went on tour to the Theatre Royal in Glasgow and other British provincial theatres. The play was described as a "children's fairy play", and its story involves a prize to be given by a Fairy Queen for the creation of a statue.

== Roles and original cast ==
The original London cast was as follows:

Act 1

- Moonshine, a White Pierrot – Seymour Hicks
- Starlight, a Black Pierrot – Courtice Pounds
- Bow and Scrape, two chamberlains – Stanley Brett and Murray King
- Esau, Pansy's gorilla – Edward Sillward
- Snowball, a sweep's boy – George Hersee
- Pansy, a cherry seller – Constance Hyem
- Sylvia, Night and Morning, pierretts – Carmen Hill, Katie Vesey and Hilda Anthony
- Dimples, Snowball's sweetheart – Winnie Hall
- Mdlle. Pas Bas, a model – Dorothy Frostick
- Josephine, a pierette maid – Gladys Archbutt
- The Chamberlain – Miss Carrington
- The Queen – Ellaline Terriss

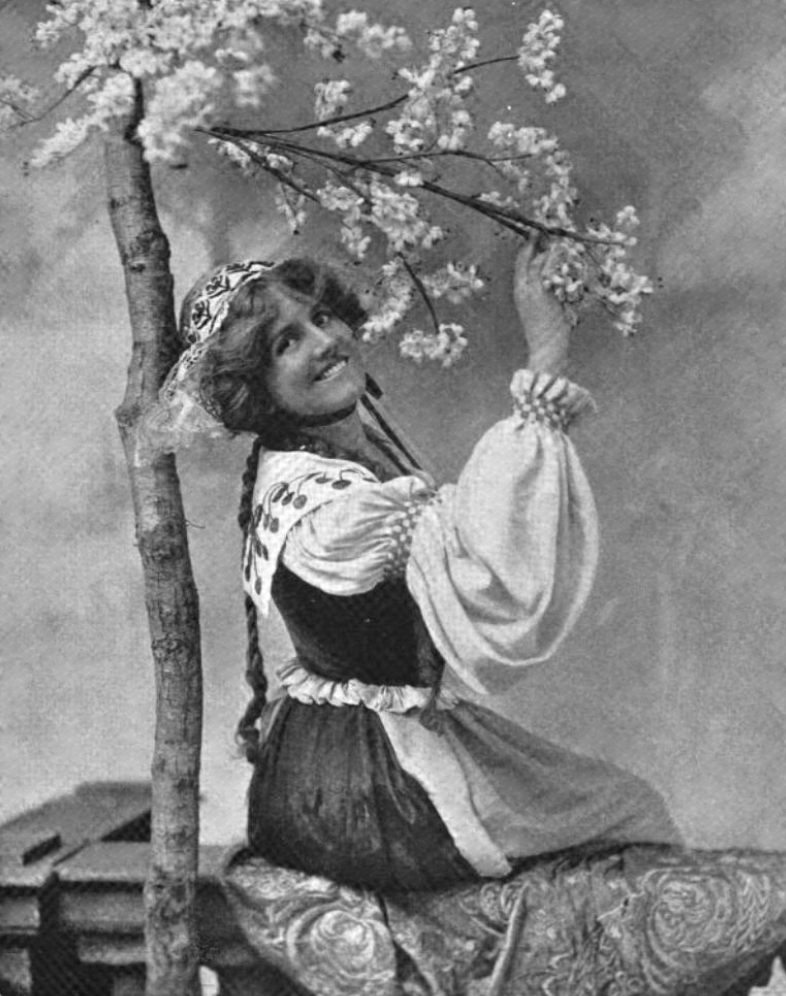
Ellaline Terriss as The Queen

Act 2

- Happy Joe, a knight of the road – Seymour Hicks
- The Squire, of Homewood Hall – Courtice Pounds
- Grab and Snatchem, two beadles – Stanley Brett and Murray King
- Rose of the Riviera, Happy Joe's stable boy – Master Valchera
- White Surrey and Hecuba, his horse and dog – Edward Sillward
- Robin Roy, Robin Me and Robin Anyone, Happy Joe's men – Frank Carroll, Robert Wilkes and William Hay
- Ikestein, his Irish servant – Charles Trevor
- Millicent, Lady of Homewood Hall – Carmen Hill
- Tip-Toe, Happy Joe's wife – Kate Vesey
- The Queen – Ellaline Terriss

== Synopsis of scenes and plot ==
The scenes for both acts are as follows:

Act 1 – Once Upon a Time

- Scene 1 – A street in carnival time (night).
- Scene 2 – On the housetops (Pierrot-land).
- Scene 3 – The throne room of the Queen.
- Scene 4 – Moonshine's studio.
- Scene 5 – Cloudland.

Act 2 – 100 Years Ago

- Scene 1 – A village green in Old England.
- Scene 2 – The gateway of Happy Joe's garden.
- Scene 3 – Happy Joe's purple garden.
- Scene 4 – Moonshine's studio again.

Reviewing the first performance, The Manchester Guardian gave this summary of the plot:

The first act passes in a fairy kingdom "once upon a time," and the first scenes of act 2 in England a hundred years ago, and the last takes us back again to the fairy kingdom. The Fairy Queen is young and has enthusiasms for art, and determines to give a prize for a statue. A White Pierrot hopes to win it with a statue of Pansy, a girl whom he loves, and he tries to become famous and rich enough to make Pansy his wife. Now, Pansy is very like the Queen, and the two change places. The Queen, disguised, comes to the studio and learns that a Black Pierrot also loves Pansy, and in a fit of jealousy destroys the statue. To save the White Pierrot the agony of knowing that his work is ruined, she personates the statue, and determines that he shall have the prize after all. The White Pierrot, who thinks she is Pansy, tells her that his luck depends on the recovery of a ruby ring which Happy Joe, a highwayman, Black Pierrot's ancestor centuries back, stole from the Squire of Homewood, his own ancestor, and as he tells the story both fall asleep. In her dreams the Queen is transported to England, and finds the ring in a cake after a cake-walk, and, waking, reveals herself as the Queen, and promises the Prize to the White Pierrot.

== Musical numbers ==
Act I

- 1. Chorus – "Revelry riots when Carnival's King"
- 2. Watchmen and Chorus – "Good folk who here rejoice"
- 3. Starlight – "Pussy Cats Three"
- 4. Chorus – "Over the tiles"
- 5. Moonshine and Chorus – "Telephone to the moon"
- 6. Chorus – "Hail! Her Majesty"
- 7. "The Queen and Chorus – Naughty, just for once"
- 8. Chorus and Dance – "Painting"
- 9. Sylvia and Chorus – "Bubble Land"
- 10. Entrance of Picture Buyers
- 11. Moonshine – "What a pretty picture"
- 12. The Queen and Moonshine – "In the Studio"
- 13. Starlight and Chorus – "Pansy"
- 14. Finale – "Sleep, little Queen, and drift away"

Act II

- 15. Chorus – "When the birds begin to sing"
- 16. The Queen – "My little Hong Kong baby"
- 17. Moonshine – "Did he?"
- 18. The Queen – "Those loving eyes"
- 19. The Queen – "Just to please you"
- 20. The Squire – "Bogeys"
- 21. Octet – "Dat's the way to spell chicken"
- 22. Spirit of Dawn – "The coming of Dawn"
- 23. The Queen – "Miss Innocent"
- 24. Finale – "God save Her Majesty"

Source: 1903 vocal score.

Following its 100th performance in March 1904, several new songs were introduced:

- "The Little Yellow Bird"
- "Fascinating Frou-Frou of the Frill"
- "When the Stars are Shining in the Sky"

== Reception ==
The Times thought that dramatically the first act was a success, but was much less impressed by the second, though it had "all sorts of pretty, clever and funny things in it." Caryll's music was judged "tuneful enough, but very thin", and too reminiscent of the composer's earlier scores. The paper's anonymous reviewer thought "Bubble Land" the best musical number. The Manchester Guardian commented:

It is very ingenious, and has a perverse charm of its own. It ought not to be good, for it is one of the most amazing mixtures of the fanciful, the topical, the artistic, and the grotesque that was ever put on a stage. But still it keeps one interested and amused, and in spite of its many contrasts the "joins" are so well managed that it all results in a consistent whole—much more consistent than many a musical comedy which boasts itself the proud possessor of a real plot.

…

It is a pretty story prettily told, with witty dialogue and many humorous interludes, in which the foibles of the day are amusingly parodied by Mr. Seymour Hicks – White Pierrot and Happy Joe, – Miss Ellaline Terriss as the Queen, and Mr. Courtice Pounds as the Black Pierrot and the Squire, The dancing of Miss Dorothy Frostick and Miss Kate Vesey, the singing of Miss Carmen Hill, the clever antics of Mr. Sellwood as a horse, the pert wit of Master Valchera as Rose of Riviera (a tiny groom who keeps his charge in order by means of a recitation), and of Master George Herser [sic] as Snowball (a sweep who parodies the Admirable Crichton) must all be mentioned as very good of their kind. The scenery is very tasteful. The stage management adroitly overcomes the difficulties of the smallness of the stage, and the dresses are all that can be desired. Mr. Ivan Caryll's music is tuneful and catchy, and here and there, has greatly imaginative touches, and is on the whole of a higher quality than that which he usually writes. It is, in short, a very enjoyable entertainment, and will serve its purpose admirably.

== Recordings ==
No recordings were released by the original cast. A list of releases by other artists is given below – it includes title, singer, record company and release date (where known):

- "Little Yellow Bird", Flo de Vere, G&T, 1904
- "By the Sycamore Tree", Helen Haydn, G&T, 1904
- "Miss Innocent", Bohemian Band, Edison Bell (cylinder)
- "Navajo", Peter Dawson, Edison Bell
- "Pansy", George Sherwin, Zonophone
