= David Garrick (1913 film) =

1913 film directed by Leedham Bantock

David Garrick is a 1913 British black-and-white silent film based on the life of British actor David Garrick. The film starred Seymour Hicks and Ellaline Terriss and was based on the 1864 play David Garrick by T. W. Robertson, adapted by Max Pemberton. The film was directed by Leedham Bantock. Made by Hepworth Pictures at Walton Studios, it was three reels long.

== Plot summary ==
The film is set in London in the 1740s where Ada Ingot, a young woman, is infatuated with the actor David Garrick. Her love for Garrick is so strong that she refuses to accept a marriage arranged by her father, Mr. Ingot. Ingot meets with Garrick and initially tries to persuade him to leave the country or give up acting, but when Garrick learns the reason, he assures Ingot that he will be able to cure Ada of her attraction and asks Ingot to arrange a meeting. Garrick is sympathetic to Ada's plight because he himself has fallen in love with a girl he doesn't know, but he promises her father that he will not make any romantic moves towards Ada.

== Cast ==
- David Garrick – Seymour Hicks
- Mr. Simon Ingot – William Lugg
- Mr. Alexander Smith – J. C. Buckstone
- Mr. Brown – Henry Kitts
- Mr. Jones – Lawrence Caird
- Ada Ingot – Ellaline Terriss
- Lord Fareleigh – Vincent Sternroyd
- Miss Araminta Brown – Nellie Dade
