= The Beauty of Bath =

Musical by Seymour Hicks and others

- Maudi Darrell as Truly St Cyr
- Music: Herbert Haines; Additional music: Jerome Kern
- Lyrics: C. H. Taylor; Additional lyrics: P. G. Wodehouse
- Book: Seymour Hicks; Cosmo Hamilton
- Productions: 1906 West End

The Beauty of Bath is a musical comedy with a book by Seymour Hicks and Cosmo Hamilton, lyrics by C. H. Taylor and music by Herbert Haines; additional songs were provided by Jerome Kern (lyrics and music), F. Clifford Harris (lyrics) and P. G. Wodehouse (lyrics). Based loosely on the play David Garrick, the story concerns a young woman from a noble family, who falls in love with an actor. She then meets a sailor who appears identical to the actor and mistakes him for the latter. Her father objects to a marriage with the actor, but when it turns out that she really loves the sailor, all objections fall away.

The piece was produced by Charles Frohman, opened at the Aldwych Theatre on 19 March 1906, moved on 26 December 1906 to the newly built Hicks Theatre and ran for a total of 287 performances. It starred Hicks and his wife, Ellaline Terriss. Zena Dare later joined the cast, replacing Terriss.

== Roles ==
- Betty Silverthorne - The Beauty of Bath - Ellaline Terriss
- Richard Alington - Lieutenant, R.N. - Seymour Hicks
- Mr Beverley - An Actor - Stanley Brett (from July 1906, Tom Terriss)
- Mrs Alington - Richard's Mother - Rosina Filippi
- Lord Bellingham - Betty's father - William Lugg
- Miss Truly St Cyr - An Actress - Maudi Darrell
- Sir Timothy Bun - Murray King
- Lady Bun - Mollie Lowell
- Mrs Goodge - Sydney Fairbrother
- Lemon Goodge - Master Valchera
- Jane - Topsy Sinden
- Tatersall Spink - Bert Sinden

== Notable musical numbers ==
- "The Beauty of Bath"
- "The Things you Never Learn at School"
- "The Frolic of the Breeze"

== Synopsis ==
Hicks and Terriss as Betty and Dick

At the interval of a play, the fashionable audience mill about in the foyer, complimenting the new hit play and its leading actor, Mr. Beverley. Sir Timothy Bun, Lady Bun, and their large family of "adopted" daughters, "the twelve Bath Buns", are part of the crowd. An actress, Miss Truly St. Cyr, is courted by a young lord. Mrs. Alington, a widow, is eagerly anticipating the return of her naval lieutenant son, Richard, whom she has not seen for ten years. The lovely Betty Silverthorne has fallen in love with the dashing Beverley during Act I, to the chagrin of her father, Lord Bellingham.

Six months before the present time, Mrs. Alington had sent her son a photograph of Betty, and the young lieutenant had fallen in love with the girl depicted. It turns out that Lieutenant Richard Alington, R.N., is identical in appearance to the actor, Mr Beverley. Richard arrives at the theatre in his sailor's undress uniform. He meets Betty and instantly recognises the girl he has loved since seeing her photograph. Betty also recognises the man she loves, mistaking him for Beverley, who has been playing a sailor's part and wearing the same uniform. Lord Bellingham next meets Richard, also mistaking him for Beverly. He objects to an actor's courting his daughter, and he invites the young lieutenant to a ball to be given the next night at his mansion, on condition that "Beverly" must pretend to be tipsy, in order to cure his daughter's love.

"Beverley" creates an embarrassing disturbance at the ball and does his utmost to draw Betty's ire. However, Betty outsmarts her father, having already figured out the likeness and true identity of Dick Alington. In addition, it happens that the man she really loves is Dick, not Beverley. This is a good thing, because her friend is already engaged to Beverly. Dick, meanwhile, has inherited five million pounds, and Lord Bellingham is delighted with the match.

== Gaiety Girls' marriages ==
As often happened with Gaiety Girls who appeared in Edwardian musical comedies, a chorus girl in The Beauty of Bath went on to marry a nobleman: Sylvia Lillian Storey (1890–1947) married William Poulett, 7th Earl Poulett. Another chorus girl in the show, May Gates, married a man calling himself Baron Von Ditton, of Norway, although the title appears to have been fictitious.
