= J. C. Buckstone =

English actor

Buckstone in The Admirable Crichton, 1902

John Copeland Buckstone (9 September 1859 – 24 September 1924) was an English stage and film actor and playwright of the late Victorian and Edwardian eras, who was most famous for his 1901 stage play Scrooge, which was the basis for the first film version of A Christmas Carol in the same year. He was the son of the actor John Baldwin Buckstone and the brother of Lucy Isabella Buckstone.

== Life and career ==
Buckstone was born in Sydenham, Kent. He appeared as Careless in School For Scandal at Theatre Royal, Dundee in 1877, alongside William Henry Chippendale (as Sir Peter Teazel), Caroline Hill (as Lady Teazel), Buckstone's sister Lucy (as Maria) and his father (as Sir Benjamin Backbite). In 1880 Buckstone played Sam Delafield in Men and Women at Proctor's Theatre. He was Frank Selwyn in The Silver King at the Princess's Theatre, London, in 1882, and at Wallack's Theatre in New York City in 1883. He also appeared in The Admirable Crichton with H. B. Irving in 1902 at the Duke of York's Theatre,

Buckstone's popular 1901 play Scrooge was quickly adapted by R.W. Paul for his film Scrooge, or, Marley's Ghost, the earliest known film adaptation of Charles Dickens's 1843 novel A Christmas Carol. Buckstone appeared in the silent David Garrick (1913) as Mr. Smith and wrote the 1913 version of Scrooge starring Seymour Hicks as Ebenezer Scrooge.

Two of his last roles were Pierre Lazarre in The Man in Dress Clothes at the Garrick Theatre (1922).and William Gosling in Good Gracious, Annabelle! at the Duke of York's Theatre (1923), in London.

He died at the age of 65 in September 1924.
