= Busman's Honeymoon (film) =

1940 British film by Arthur B. Woods

- American theatrical release lobby card
- Directed by: Arthur B. Woods
- Screenplay by: Monckton Hoffe; Angus MacPhail; Harold Goldman
- Based on: 1936 play Busman's Honeymoon by Dorothy L. Sayers; Muriel St. Clare Byrne
- Produced by: Harold Huth; Ben Goetz
- Starring: Robert Montgomery; Constance Cummings; Leslie Banks; Sir Seymour Hicks
- Cinematography: Freddie Young
- Edited by: Al Barnes; James B. Clark
- Music by: Louis Levy; Charles Williams (uncredited)
- Production company: Metro-Goldwyn-Mayer British Studios
- Distributed by: Loew's Inc.
- Release date: 22 July 1940 (UK)
- Running time: 99 minutes
- Country: United Kingdom
- Language: English

Busman's Honeymoon (US title: Haunted Honeymoon) is a 1940 British detective film directed by Arthur B. Woods and starring Robert Montgomery, Constance Cummings, Leslie Banks, Googie Withers, Robert Newton and Seymour Hicks. It was written by Monckton Hoffe, Angus MacPhail and Harold Goldman, adapted from the 1937 Lord Peter Wimsey novel Busman's Honeymoon by Dorothy L. Sayers.

== Plot ==
Newly married amateur detective Lord Peter Wimsey and his wife, mystery writer Harriet Vane, are looking forward to a quiet honeymoon at their new country cottage when they are reluctantly drawn into the investigation of a local murder.

== Cast ==
- Robert Montgomery as Lord Peter Wimsey
- Constance Cummings as Harriet Vane
- Sir Seymour Hicks as Mervyn Bunter
- Leslie Banks as Inspector Andrew Kirk
- Robert Newton as Frank Crutchley
- Googie Withers as Polly
- Frank Pettingell as William George Puffett, the sweep
- Joan Kemp-Welch as Aggie Twitterton
- Aubrey Mallalieu as Reverend Simon Goodacre
- James Carney as Constable Tom Sellon
- Roy Emerton as Noakes
- Louise Hampton as Mrs. Doris Ruddle
- Eliot Makeham as Simpson
- Reginald Purdell as MacBride
- Allan Whittaker as the doctor
- Ben Williams as Town Inspector

== Production ==
Location shooting on Busman's Honeymoon began 4 August 1939 with Richard Thorpe as the original director. After the outbreak of the Second World War, the film was "shelved" until March 1940 with Arthur B. Woods appointed as director. Principal photography took place from 21 March to mid-April 1940 at Denham Studios, as well as other locations in England.

== Critical reception ==
The Monthly Film Bulletin wrote: "This is a pleasant but slow-moving film in which the main interest is not so much in the crime as in the delightfully romantic passages between Wimsey and his wife, varied by the oddities of the village characters ... Robert Montgomery tries hard but never quite succeeds in conveying Wimsey's aristocratic intelligent charm. Constance Cummings is more successful as Harriet Vane, but Sir Seymour Hicks steals the picture in the part of Bunter, his butler being superbly impeccable."

Kine Weekly wrote: "It is a play of atmosphere rather than thrills – the types are good and the backgrounds both authentic and picturesque – but although suspense is almost negligible it should keep an audience on the qui vive and promote a reasonable number of laughs.

Bosley Crowther wrote in The New York Times, "Seldom has there been a film so pleasantly conducive to browsing as this leisurely, bookish fable of murder in Devonshire; not of late has there been one so steeped in the genteel tradition of British crime literature. A glass of port, at least, should be taken along with it."

Variety wrote: "Treatment of an episode in the debonair Lord Peter Wimsey's career is a light and unpretentious vehicle, developed strictly for audiences that take their entertainment with ease and well-wishing. With Robert Montgomery for marqueeing, 'Honeymoon' will hold them, although making no great splash."
