= The Catch of the Season =

Musical by Seymour Hicks and others

- Hicks and Terriss
- Music: Herbert Haines; Evelyn Baker
- Lyrics: Charles H. Taylor
- Book: Seymour Hicks; Cosmo Hamilton
- Basis: Cinderella
- Productions: 1904 West End; 1905 Broadway; 1907 Budapest; 1909 Sydney; 1913 Vienna

The Catch of the Season is an Edwardian musical comedy by Seymour Hicks and Cosmo Hamilton, with music by Herbert Haines and Evelyn Baker and lyrics by Charles H. Taylor, based on the fairy tale Cinderella. A debutante is engaged to a young aristocrat but loves a page.

The musical premiered at the Vaudeville Theatre in London in 1904 and ran for 621 performances. It starred Hicks, Zena Dare and Camille Clifford. Replacements included Louie Pounds. The New York production, in 1905, starred Edna May, at Daly's Theatre. The show was produced internationally and was revived until the First World War.

== Synopsis ==
Lady Caterham's stepdaughter Angela is a debutante about to "come out" and is "the catch of the season". She becomes engaged to the young rake, Lord St. Jermyns, although she really loves the page, Bucket. Honoria Bedford, Lady Crystal's younger daughter, who is also about to "come out", has taken up smoking, which in 1904 was considered shocking.

== Productions ==
The Catch of the Season was produced by Agostino and Stefano Gatti and American Charles Frohman at the Vaudeville Theatre in London, opening on 9 September 1904 and running for a very successful 621 performances. The production starred Zena Dare as Angela, because Hicks' wife Ellaline Terriss was pregnant. Later Terriss played the role for a time, ceding it to Dare's sister, Phyllis Dare. It also starred Hicks and Louie Pounds. Belgian-American actress Camille Clifford, who played Sylvia Gibson, became perhaps the most famous "Gibson Girl".

Frohman produced the musical on both sides of the Atlantic, and one year after the premiere, with the London production still running, he exported The Catch of the Season to Daly's Theatre in New York, where Edna May starred with an English supporting cast and a chorus of English and French "Gibson Girls". The score was supplemented with numerous interpolations, principally by American music director William T. Francis and also by Jerome Kern.

Other international productions followed. In Budapest The Catch of the Season was translated as A bálkirálynő by Jenő Heltai in 1907. The Australian premiere was at Her Majesty's Theatre, Sydney in 1909. In Vienna Die Ballkönigin, translated by Fritz Lunzer and actor Karl Tuschl, was mounted twice in 1913, first at the Sommertheater Venedig in Wien, then as a holiday entertainment at the Theater an der Wien. London revivals included a 1917 production at the Prince's Theatre.

== Roles and original cast ==
- Angela Crystal – Zena Dare (replaced by Ellaline Terriss and later Phyllis Dare)
- Duke of St. Jermyns – Seymour Hicks
- Higham Montague – Stanley Brett
- William Gibson – Compton Coutts
- Sir John Crystal – Charles Daly
- Lady Crystal – Mollie Lowell
- Lady Caterham – Rosina Filippi
- Almeric Montpelier – Philip Desborough
- Lord Dundreary – Sam Sothern
- Captain Rushpool – Mervyn Dene
- Lord Yatton – Cecil Kinnaird
- Miss Caw – Barbara Deane
- Hon. Sophia Bedford – Ethel Matthews (Louie Pounds later played the role)
- Duchess of St. Jermyns – Ruby Ray
- Enid Gibson – Kate Vesey
- Princess Schowenhohen-Hohenschowen – Lily Maynier
- Clotilde – Helene Blanche
- Bucket – Master A. Valchera
- Honoria Crystal – Hilda Jacobson
- Sylvia Gibson – Camille Clifford
- Footmen, Guests, Gibson Girls, Bridesmaids

== Musical numbers ==
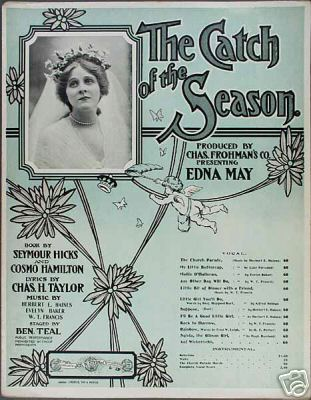
Sheet music from the Broadway production

Broadway score (music by Haines and Baker and lyrics by Taylor, except as noted):

Act I

- Tea and tittle tattle – Lady Crystal, Lord Yatton, Almeric Montpelier, Footmen and Chorus
- We've become the great attraction – Gibson Girls
- (It's) All Done by Kindness (Music by William T. Francis) – Mr. William Gibson
- I'll Be a Good Little Girl – Angela
- If I Were King of Babylon – Bucket
- (My Little) Buttercup (Music by Luke Forwood) – Angela
- Fairy attendants! – Clotilde, Angela, Lady Caterham and Assistants

Act II

- Every year there's somebody – Chorus
- Sylvia the Gibson Girl (Lyrics by Frank Compton, music by Hugh Rumbold) – Gibson Girls
- Seaweed (Music and Lyrics by Fred Earle) – Mr. William Gibson
- Hail! Miss O'Halloran – Chorus
- Molly O'Halloran (Music and Lyrics by Jerome Kern) – Angela
- A Little Bit of Dinner (with a Friend) (Music by William T. Francis) – Lord Yatton
- Suppose – Angela and The Duke of St. Jermyns
- Auf Wiedersehn (Lyrics by Vernon Roy, music by William T. Francis) – Talleur Andrews
- The Church Parade – The Duke of St. Jermyns
- Back to Harrow (Lyrics by J. J. Montague, music by William T. Francis) – Mr. William Gibson and Lord Yatton
- Rainbow (Lyrics by Fred W. Leigh, music by Henry E. Pether) – Angela
- Rosy Petals We Will Shower (Music by William T. Francis)
- Cinderella! You Have Won! (Music by William T. Francis) – Angela

The Broadway score cut the following songs by Haines, Baker and Taylor (except as noted) that had been included in the British production:

- "Raining"
- "Won't You Kiss Me Once Before You Do?" (by Kern and Harris)
- "Cupid is the Captain of the Army" (by Dave Reed Jr.)
- "Around the World (by Cass Freeborn and Grant Stewart)
- "Cigarette"
- "The Charms on My Chain"
