= Ellaline Terriss =

English actress and singer (1871–1971)

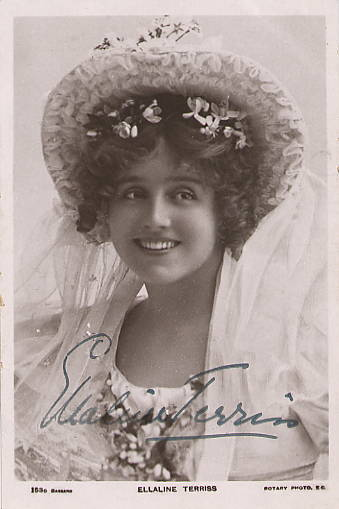
- Born: Mary Ellaline Lewin; 13 April 1871; Stanley, Falkland Islands
- Died: 16 June 1971 (aged 100); Hampstead, London, England
- Occupation: Actress
- Spouse: Sir Edward Seymour Hicks (m. 1893; died 1949)
- Children: 2

Mary Ellaline Terriss, Lady Hicks (born Mary Ellaline Lewin, 13 April 1871 – 16 June 1971), known professionally as Ellaline Terriss, was a popular British actress and singer, best known for her performances in Edwardian musical comedies. She met and married the actor-producer Seymour Hicks in 1893, and the two collaborated on many projects for the stage and screen.

The daughter of the actor William Terriss, Ellaline made her London stage debut at the age of 16 in Cupid's Messenger at London's Haymarket Theatre. Impressed with her performance, the producer Charles Wyndham gave her a three-year contract, under which she first played Madge in Why Women Weep. In 1892 Terriss starred in Faithful James (by B. C. Stephenson), and the following year she starred in the title role of Cinderella, produced by Henry Irving. She was featured in W. S. Gilbert's His Excellency in 1894, followed the next year by a starring role in the George Edwardes production of the musical The Shop Girl, playing alongside her husband. The next year she starred in another musical hit, The Circus Girl.

In 1897, her father was murdered by a deranged actor. As a result, she received much public sympathy, returning to the stage to star in A Runaway Girl in 1898, one of her most successful shows. In the 1900s, she starred in a series of long-running hits, including Bluebell in Fairyland (1901), Quality Street (1902), The Catch of the Season (1905) and The Beauty of Bath (1906). After 1910, Terriss concentrated on comedy roles and music hall tours. Her unsuccessful return to musical comedy, Cash on Delivery (1917), confirmed the wisdom of this new career course.

Her later career also included film roles. She began in the silent films Scrooge and David Garrick (both from 1913) and made a successful transfer to talkies; her last film was The Four Just Men in 1939. She died in Hampstead, England, at the age of 100.

== Early life ==
Terriss was born in Port Stanley, Falkland Islands.

Her father, William Lewin, became a well-known actor in London under the name William Terriss. He loved the adventurous, outdoor life, and had previously tried his hand at various professions, including farmer, merchant seaman and silver miner. Shortly after Ellaline's birth, he gave up farming and moved his family back to England where, because of his swashbuckling style, was known as "Breezy Bill". Her brother Tom became an actor and then a well-known film director. Her mother Isabel (née Lewis) also acted under the stage name Amy Fellowes.

=== Early career ===
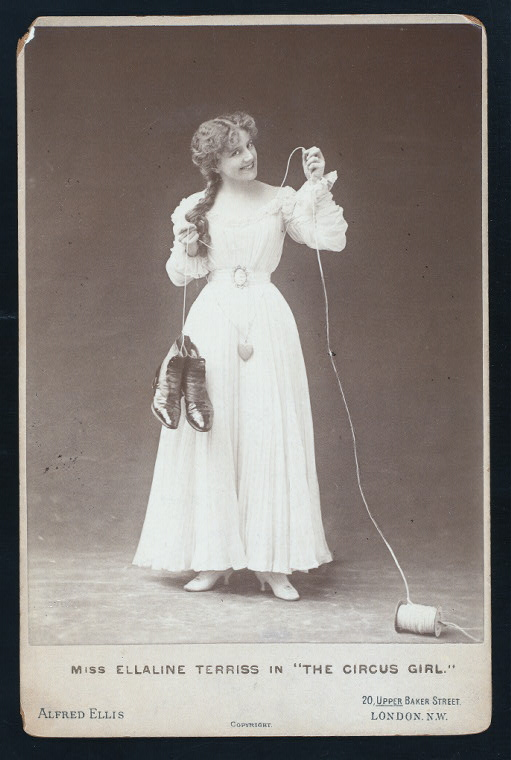
Terriss as Dora in The Circus Girl

Terriss performed from an early age, although she had no real ambition to act professionally. In 1887, she appeared in pantomime at the Alexandra Theatre, Liverpool. Petite, pretty and talented, she attracted the praise of both critics and the public. She came to the attention of Herbert Beerbohm Tree, who signed her to make her professional London debut in the role of Mary Herbert in Cupid's Messenger, in 1888 at the Haymarket Theatre. Impressed by this performance, Charles Wyndham gave her a three-year contract, under which she first played Madge in Why Women Weep. She also attracted the attention of a promising young actor, Seymour Hicks, and they married in 1893.

In 1892, Terriss starred in Faithful James, by B. C. Stephenson, with Brandon Thomas at the Court Theatre. In December 1893, Terriss starred in the title role in the successful and famously lavish version of the "fairy pantomime" Cinderella, produced by Henry Irving with music by Oscar Barrett. Toward the end of the run, Hicks took over the role of Thisbe, one of Cinderella's half-sisters. They brought this production to America under the management of George Edwardes. The following season, Terriss played a supporting role in the W. S. Gilbert and Frank Osmond Carr comic opera His Excellency.

In 1895, Terriss was a replacement in the original London production of George Edwardes's hit, The Shop Girl, joining her husband as co-star. They toured America in 1895, where they befriended the American novelist Richard Harding Davis. At the instance of Gilbert, Hicks wrote a drama called One of the Best, a vehicle for Terriss's father William Terriss at the Adelphi Theatre, based on the famous Dreyfus trial. The Hickses were frequent guests of Gilbert at his estate in Grim's Dyke. Terriss next played the title role, May, in My Girl (1896 at the Gaiety). Another early success for the young couple was The Circus Girl (1896; Terriss made Lionel Monckton's song, "A Simple Little String" into a major hit).

=== Tragedy and triumph ===
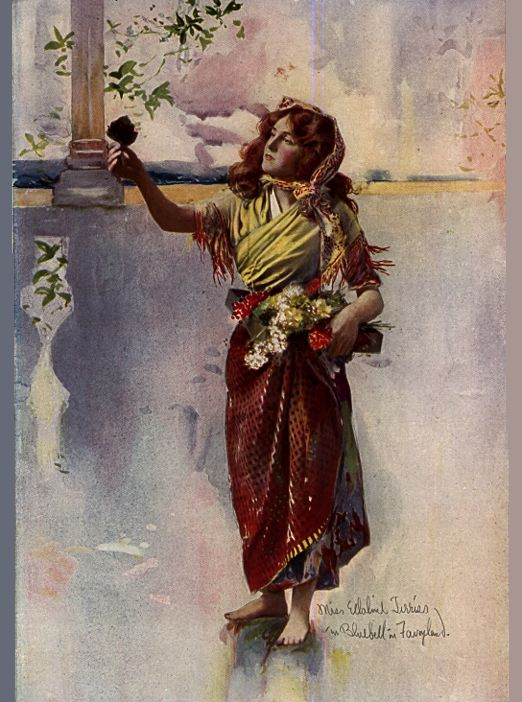
Illustration from Bluebell in Fairyland

In December 1897, while Terriss was still playing in The Circus Girl, two tragedies befell her. Her father was stabbed to death by a deranged and disgruntled unemployed actor, Richard Archer Prince, as he was about to enter the stage door of the Royal Adelphi Theatre. Her mother died shortly afterwards.

The murder, and Prince's trial, filled the country's newspapers for weeks. Already the most popular couple on the London stage, Terriss and Hicks received an outpouring of sympathy. They moved on, becoming even more famous over the next decade. She next starred in the title role of a new show co-authored by Hicks, A Runaway Girl (1898), which became one of the Gaiety Theatre's most successful shows. This was followed by With Flying Colours (1899). The couple adopted a daughter, Mabel, in about 1897, and Terriss gave birth to another child, Betty, in 1904.

In early 1900, the Hickses played in their only Broadway show together, My Daughter-in-law, at the Frohman brothers' old Lyceum Theatre. They then joined forces with the producer Charles Frohman and, in his company over a period of seven years, they played the leads in a series of musicals written by Hicks, including: Bluebell in Fairyland (1901), which was continually revived as a Christmas entertainment for the next four decades; The Cherry Girl (1902); The Beauty of Bath (1906), which opened the Hicks Theatre (later renamed the Globe) and included additional lyrics by a newcomer, P. G. Wodehouse, and music by Jerome Kern, which became one of Terriss's best-loved roles; and The Gay Gordons (1907).

Hicks and Terriss also starred in J. M. Barrie's play Quality Street in 1902. At that time, they moved to a new home, the Old Forge, at Merstham, Surrey. Their cul-de-sac was renamed "Quality Street".

=== Later career ===
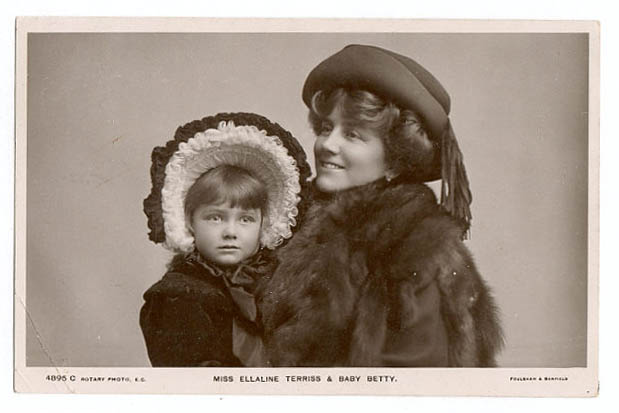
Terriss with daughter Betty

The couple performed constantly, both in London and on tour in America, except when Terriss was pregnant with Betty. In 1905, Terriss took over the role of Angela in her husband's The Catch of the Season, which had been created by Zena Dare during Terriss's pregnancy. Later Terriss ceded the role to Dare's sister, Phyllis.

In 1907, Terriss reduced the gruelling acting schedule she had kept up for almost twenty years, although she continued to appear in a limited number of plays, including The Dashing Little Duke (1909; with C. Hayden Coffin, Courtice Pounds and Louie Pounds), which was less successful. She played the title role in that production (a woman disguised as a man). When she missed several performances due to illness, Hicks played the role – possibly the only case in the history of professional musical theatre where a husband succeeded to his wife's role.

After the failure of Captain Kidd (1910), Hicks and Terriss concentrated on comedy roles and music hall tours, including a tour of South Africa in 1911 and later a tour of France following the outbreak of World War I, to give concerts to British troops at the front. Their unsuccessful return to musical comedy, Cash on Delivery (1917), confirmed the wisdom of their new career course. After 1917, Terriss returned to the stage only on special occasions. In December 1925, she appeared at the Lyceum with her husband in The Man in Dress Clothes, a French farce he had translated and in which their daughter made her stage debut. It was intended only to run for a short season, but it was such a success that its run was extended. "The Theatre World" reported in January 1926:

There is little doubt that much of the success of this revival is due to the presence in the cast of our one and only Ellaline Terriss. Of the older generation of actresses there is no more beloved figure than "dear Ella" as the gallery girls used to call her. She has never been a "great" actress, but her charm – a sort of sweet radiance – has made her one of the most popular of living players.

=== Film career ===
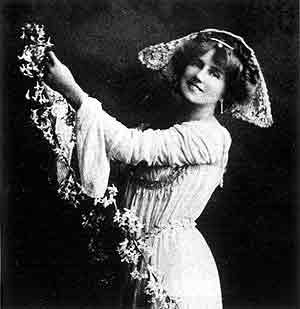
Terriss, c. 1896

Terriss appeared in over a dozen British films, generally in which her husband was involved as an actor, writer or director. These included the silent films Scrooge (1913), David Garrick (1913), Flame of Passion (1915), A Woman of the World (1916), Masks and Faces (1918), Always Tell Your Wife (1923), Land of Hope and Glory (1927) and Blighty (1927).

She made a successful transition to talkies, including Atlantic (1929), A Man of Mayfair (1931), Glamour (1931), The Iron Duke (1934), Royal Cavalcade (1935) and The Four Just Men (1939).

=== Retirement and death ===
The grave of Seymour Hicks and Ellaline Terriss in Fleet Cemetery in Hampshire in 2026

In 1940, Terriss and Hicks went to the Middle East with "ENSA", to entertain the British troops in World War II. After the war, Terriss retired from the stage. She and Hicks moved to South Africa, where she took up painting and was tutored by the marine artist George Pilkington. So good were her works that an exhibition was held at Foyle's Art Gallery, London, in February 1959. Hicks, who was knighted in 1935, died in 1949, and Terriss survived him by 22 years. In 1952 she was a guest on Desert Island Discs on BBC Radio during which she stated that her luxury item would be a piano. She was the subject of an episode of This Is Your Life in 1962.

Terriss died at the Holy Family Nursing Home, Hampstead, London, at the age of 100 as a result of a hip fracture sustained during a fall. She was buried with her husband in Fleet Cemetery in Hampshire.

== Genealogy ==
Grote-Lewin Family Tree

Richard Lewin (7 issue)	Mary Brown
George Grote	Thomas Lewin (12 issue)	Mary Hale
John Grote	Arthur Grote	George Grote	Harriet Grote	George Herbert Lewin	Mary Friend
Margaret Elliot Lewin	Thomas Herbert Lewin	Mary Lewin	Harriet Browne	William Terriss	Isabella Stevenson	Friend “Bob” Lewin
Everest MacDonald	Charles Lewin	Audrey Waterhouse
Ellaline Terriss	Tom Terriss
