= Seymour Hicks =

British actor and playwright (1871–1949)

Sir Seymour Hicks
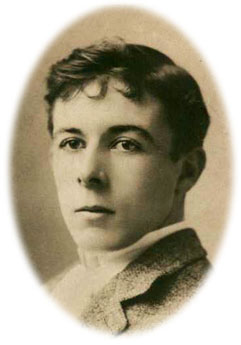
- Born: Edward Seymour Hicks; 30 January 1871; St Helier, Jersey, Channel Islands
- Died: 6 April 1949 (aged 78); Hampshire, England
- Occupations: Actor-manager; playwright
- Spouse: Ellaline Terriss (1893–1949) (his death)
- Awards: Legion of Honour (1931)

Sir Edward Seymour Hicks (30 January 1871 – 6 April 1949), better known as Seymour Hicks, was a British actor, music hall performer, playwright, actor-manager and producer. He became known, early in his career, for writing, starring in and producing Edwardian musical comedy, often together with his famous wife, Ellaline Terriss. His most famous acting role was that of Ebenezer Scrooge in Charles Dickens's A Christmas Carol.

Making his stage début at the age of nine and performing professionally by sixteen, Hicks joined a theatrical company and toured America before starring in Under the Clock in 1893, the first musical revue ever staged in London. Following this, he starred in a revival of Little Jack Sheppard at the Gaiety Theatre, London which brought him to the attention of impresario George Edwardes. Edwardes cast Hicks in his next show, The Shop Girl, in 1894. Its success led to his participation in two more of Edwardes's hit "girl" musicals, The Circus Girl (1896) and A Runaway Girl (1898), both starring Terriss. He first played the role of Ebenezer Scrooge in 1901 and eventually played it thousands of times onstage. Hicks, along with his wife, joined the producer Charles Frohman in his theatre company and wrote and starred in a series of extraordinarily successful musicals, including Bluebell in Fairyland (1901), Quality Street (1902), The Earl and the Girl (1903) and The Catch of the Season (1904).

Hicks used his fortune from these shows to commission the building of the Aldwych Theatre in 1905 and the Hicks Theatre in 1906, opening the latter with a new hit show, The Beauty of Bath. His stage performances were less successful in later years, and he opted instead to star in music hall tours, including Pebbles on the Beach (1912). He continued to write light comedies, the most popular of which was The Happy Day (1916). On film, he first appeared in Scrooge and David Garrick both from 1913. Later notable films included The Lambeth Walk (1939) and Busman's Honeymoon (1940), and his last film was in the year of his death, 1949.

== Life and career ==
Hicks was born in St Helier on the island of Jersey. At the age of nine, he appeared as Little Buttercup in Gilbert and Sullivan's H.M.S. Pinafore at his school in Bath. After that, he was determined to be an actor.

=== Early career ===
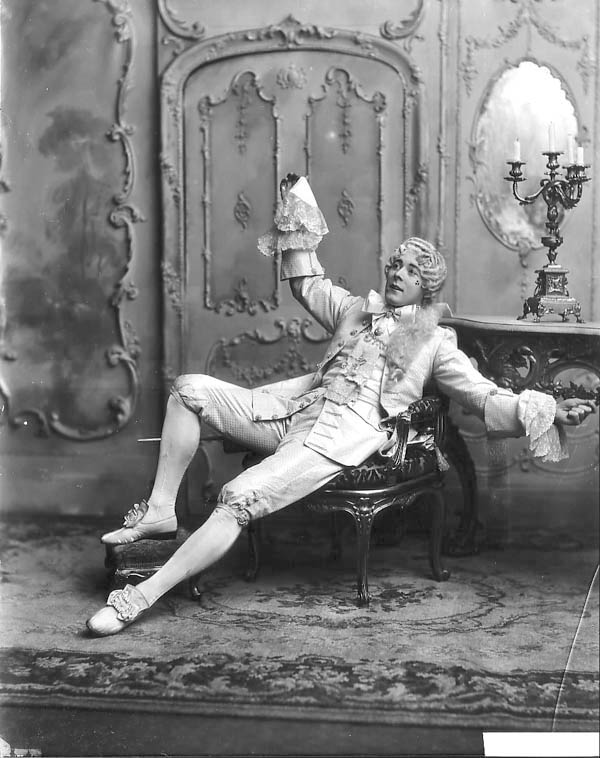
Hicks in A Court Scandal, 1899

Hicks first appeared professionally on stage at the age of sixteen in a production of In the Ranks at the Grand, Islington. In 1889, he joined the theatrical company of Mr. and Mrs. Kendal for an American tour where they presented a repertory of contemporary plays. Hicks starred as Dr. Watson in the first revue show ever staged in London, Under the Clock (1893), a parody of Sherlock Holmes and Watson written by Hicks with Charles Brookfield (who played Holmes), at the Royal Court Theatre. That same year, he married Ellaline Terriss. After that, he starred in a revival of Little Jack Sheppard at the Gaiety Theatre, London. This brought him to the attention of the impresario George Edwardes. In 1894, Hicks joined his wife in the successful "Fairy pantomime", Cinderella, produced by Henry Irving at the Lyceum Theatre with music by Oscar Barrett, where she had been playing the title role. He played Thisbe, one of Cinderella's half-sisters who, in this version, were "Girton College girls who can jabber Greek and Latin, read French, play golf, and indulge in manly exercises. Thisbe has an affectation for intellectuality – Ibsen, Spooks, and the new humor."

Edwardes gave Hicks the chance to star in his next show, The Shop Girl (1894), which became a hit at the Gaiety in 1894, playing for 546 performances. Hicks's wife joined Edwardes's company during the run of the show, replacing the star in the title role, and together they made the musical an even bigger hit. The following year, Hicks transferred with the show to Broadway for a short run and then toured in America in 1895 with his wife, where they befriended the American novelist Richard Harding Davis. At the instance of W. S. Gilbert, Hicks wrote a drama called One of the Best, a vehicle for his father-in-law William Terriss at the Adelphi Theatre, based on the famous Dreyfus trial. The Hickses were frequent guests of Gilbert at his estate in Grim's Dyke. Hicks hurried back from America for the opening in December 1895. It ran for over a year.

Another early success for the young couple was The Circus Girl (1896). Hicks and Terriss both had a comedy background, and they transformed the "lovers" roles in the new genre of Edwardian musicals from overly sentimental to mischievous and light-hearted characters exchanging witty banter. Hicks then worked as co-author on The Yashmak and then on one of the Gaiety Theatre's most successful shows, A Runaway Girl (1898), in which Terriss played the title role. This was followed by With Flying Colours (1899). Also in 1899, Hicks starred as the Duc De Richelieu in A Court Scandal, a comedy adapted by Aubrey Boucicault and Osmond Shillingford from Les Premières Armes de Richelieu by Dumanoir, at the Court Theatre. The same year, he and Terriss adopted a daughter, Mabel, and Terriss gave birth to their second child, Elizabeth ("Betty), in 1904.

=== Frohman years ===
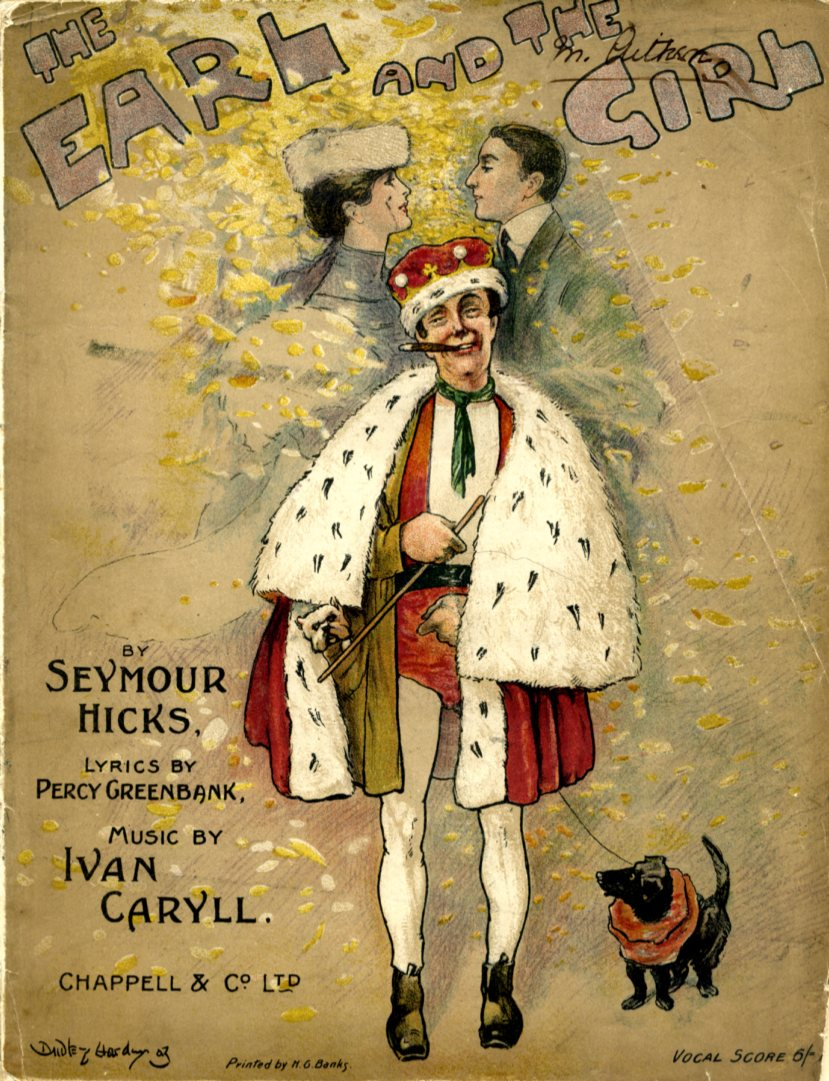
The Earl and the Girl, cover of vocal score

In early 1900, the Hickses played in their only Broadway show together, My Daughter-in-law, at the Frohman brothers' old Lyceum Theatre. They then joined forces with producer Charles Frohman and, in his company, over a period of seven years, they played the leads in a series of musicals written by Hicks, including Bluebell in Fairyland (1901 with music by Walter Slaughter and lyrics by Charles Taylor – this Christmas show for children was continually revived for the next four decades) and The Cherry Girl (1902). Hicks and Terriss also starred in Quality Street in 1902. At that time, they moved to a new home, The Old Forge, at Merstham, Surrey. Their cul-de-sac was renamed "Quality Street".

Hicks also wrote the highly successful The Earl and the Girl (1903) and the successful The Catch of the Season (1904 with Herbert Haines and Taylor). Ellaline was pregnant with Betty, and so Zena Dare originated the leading role in The Catch of the Season until Terriss could assume the role. Dare's sister Phyllis Dare left the stage abruptly in 1905 and a Frederick Henry Wolfries spread rumours that she was pregnant by Hicks, and Hicks received written and verbal abuse for his alleged conduct. In November 1906, Wolfries appeared at the Liverpool Assizes accused of libelling Hicks, while passing himself off as Dare's brother. He was found guilty and sentenced to eight months' imprisonment.

Hicks wrote, and Frohman produced, The Talk of the Town (1905 with Haines and Taylor), The Beauty of Bath (1906 with Haines and Taylor; the show included additional lyrics by newcomer P. G. Wodehouse and additional music by Jerome Kern), My Darling (1907 with Haines), and The Gay Gordons (1907). Hicks used some of the fortune he received from these shows to build the Aldwych Theatre in 1905 and the Hicks Theatre in 1906, which was renamed the "Globe Theatre" in 1909 and then the "Gielgud Theatre" in 1994. The Beauty of Bath was the first production at the theatre.

=== Later stage work ===
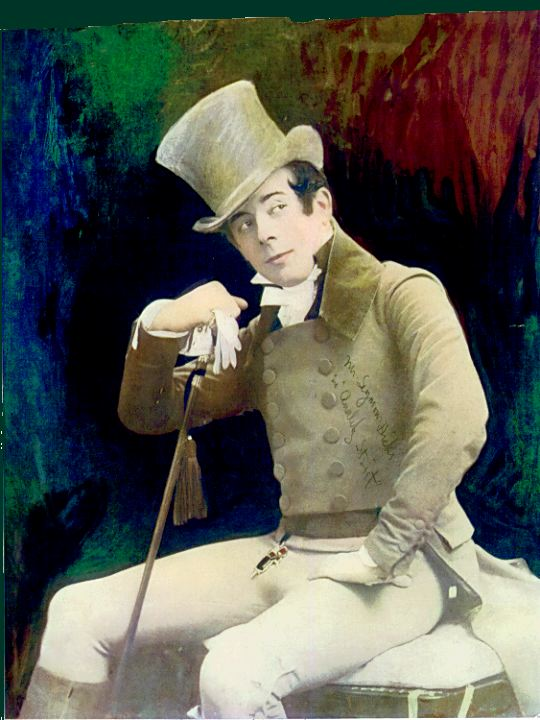
Drawing of Hicks in Quality Street

In The Dashing Little Duke (1909; with C. Hayden Coffin, Courtice Pounds and Louie Pounds), produced by Hicks at the Hicks Theatre, which was less successful, Hicks' wife played the title role (a woman playing a man). When she missed several performances due to illness, Hicks played the role – possibly the only case in musical theatre history where a husband succeeded to his wife's role. The piece was based on A Court Scandal, in which Hicks had played in 1899. Hicks then wrote and starred in Captain Kidd (1910), an adaptation with music and lyrics by Leslie Stuart and Adrian Ross, of the American farce The Dictator (1904 by Richard Harding Davis). This flopped, bringing an end to the era of supremacy in London's musical theatre of Hicks and Terriss. Hicks appeared in his first Shakespeare play that year, Richard III. The same year, he penned the first of several autobiographies. The following year, he took a company on a tour of South Africa. After the outbreak of World War I, Hicks was the first British actor to bring a tour to France (with Terriss), giving concerts to British troops at the front. Because of this, he was awarded the French Croix de Guerre. Hicks was briefly declared bankrupt in 1915.

Hicks and Terriss concentrated on comedy roles and music hall tours in later years, including Pebbles on the Beach (1912), singing and dancing 'Alexander's Ragtime Band'. Their one return to musical comedy, Cash on Delivery (1917), confirmed the public's preference for comedy revues and music hall. Hicks continued to write light, escapist comedies, such as The Happy Day (1916), Sleeping Partners (1917) and, after the war, satiric farces, such as Good Luck and Head Over Heels (1923) and adaptations of French farces (The Man in Dress Clothes). In 1931, he was awarded the Legion of Honour for his promotion of French drama on the English stage. Hicks was knighted in 1935. In 1934, he had taken over Daly's Theatre in London, where he produced and appeared in a series of successful plays including Vintage Wine that he and Ashley Dukes adapted from a novel. He also directed and appeared in The Miracle Man at the Victoria Palace Theatre. When World War II began, he acted, on 12 November 1939, as the master of ceremonies at the first concert given in France by the newly formed ENSA (Entertainment National Service Association). For this action, Hicks was awarded his second Croix de Guerre.

=== Films ===
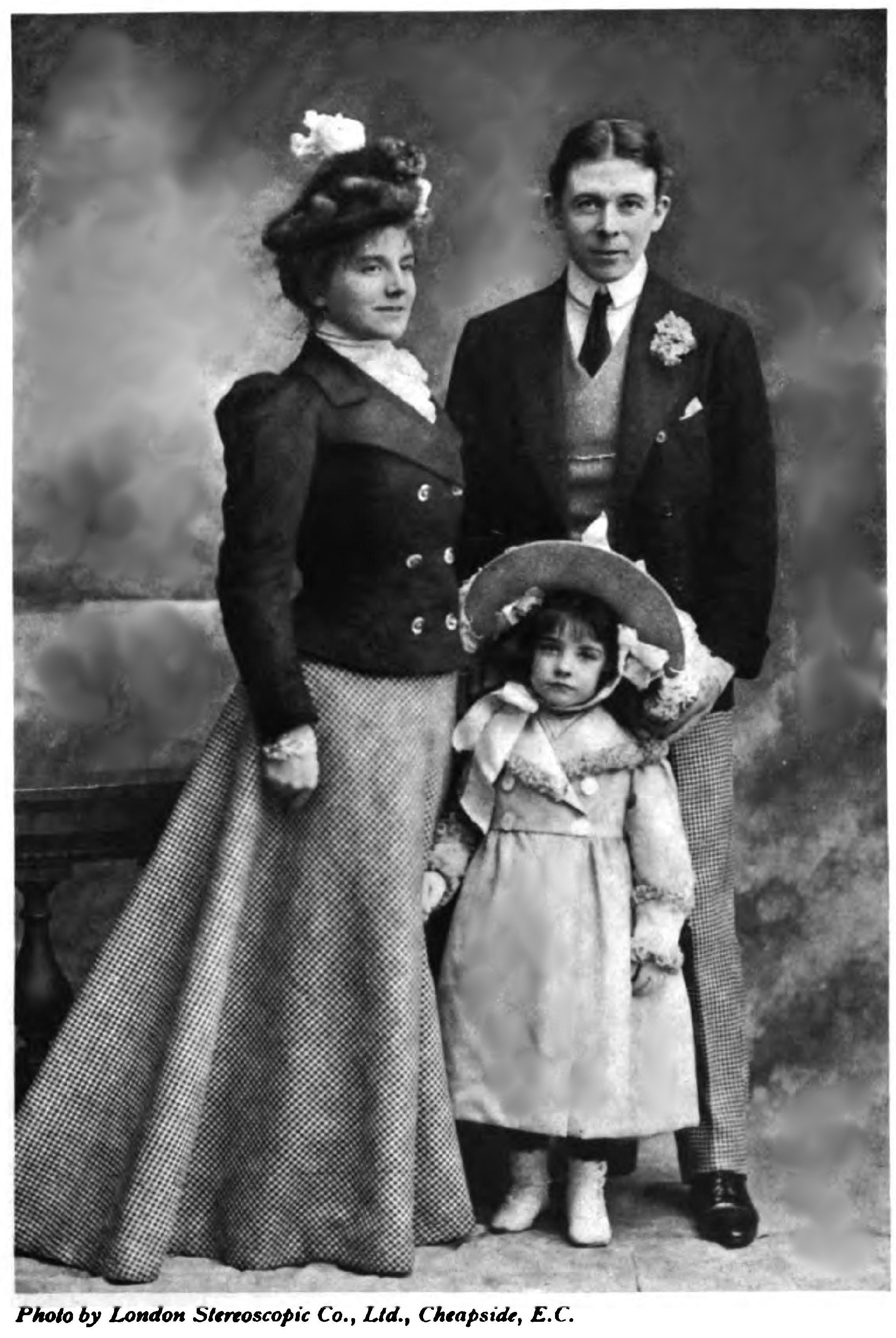
Hicks with Terriss and their daughter Betty

Hicks appeared in three early silent films: Scrooge and David Garrick in 1913, and A Prehistoric Love Story in 1915, all directed by Leedham Bantock. He decided in 1923 to produce his own films. His first film, in which he starred, was Always Tell Your Wife, which was based on one of his plays. While making that film, Hicks fired the director and hired an unknown young director to make his debut: Alfred Hitchcock. Hicks directed Sleeping Partners (1930) and Glamour (1931). In addition, over a dozen films were made either from his plays or his scripts, and he starred in about twenty films, many with his wife. One of his early films was Money for Nothing (1932)

Among his other film appearances, Hicks starred in the film version of his show Vintage Wine (1935) and as Sir John Tremayne in The Lambeth Walk (1939), the film version of the stage musical Me and My Girl, Young Man's Fancy (1939), Pastor Hall (1940) and Busman's Honeymoon (1940). Hicks wrote for films until 1941 (Kisses for Breakfast, in which he starred). Later films included Fame Is the Spur (1947) and Silent Dust (1949).

=== Scrooge ===
Hicks's most famous role was Ebenezer Scrooge in Charles Dickens's A Christmas Carol. He first played this role in 1901 and eventually played it thousands of times on stage, often at benefits, and twice on film. The 1913 silent film Scrooge, produced in England, was re-released in 1926 by Pathé Pictures under the title Old Scrooge, and issued "with sound" (synchronized music) by the low-budget Weiss Bros. studio in 1929.

Scrooge (1935) was the first feature-length film version of the story with sound. Hicks took the title role and contributed to the screenplay without screen credit. The reviewer for Variety remarked, "Seymour Hicks has played Ebenezer Scrooge off and on for a quarter of a century. He ... was undoubtedly invaluable with his assistance in directing and production details." Frank Nugent of The New York Times called Scrooge "a faithful, tender and mellow edition" of A Christmas Carol. "Sir Seymour's portrayal of Scrooge is, of course, the highlight of the photoplay". William Boehnel of the New York World Telegram wrote, "[Hicks offers] ... a performance that brings Scrooge to life on the screen exactly as Dickens imagined him". The finished film ran eight reels (78 minutes), but for more than 40 years a 1941 abridged abridged, six-reel (60-minute) version was the only way the film could be seen. Local television stations in the U.S. aired it around Christmas in the 1940s. In the early 1980s, with the advent of home video and the spread of cable TV stations showing public domain movies, the film became familiar to a new generation of viewers. The Learning Channel acquired the original 78-minute version and broadcast it in 1984.

== Last years and death ==
The grave of Seymour Hicks and Ellaline Terriss in Fleet Cemetery

He continued appearing on stage and in films until a year before his death in Hampshire, England, at the age of 78. He was buried at Fleet Cemetery in Hampshire.
