= A Century of Song =

Box set by La Musique Populaire
- Released: November 15, 2004
- Recorded: 1999–2003
- Studio: Eckhouse 2000, Evanston
- Genres: Rock, chamber pop
- Length: 7:29:19
- Label: Polyholiday
- Producer: La Musique Populaire

La Musique Populaire chronology
Love Conquers Alda (2003)	A Century of Song (2004)

A Century of Song is a 6-CD box set by La Musique Populaire. As the title suggests, A Century of Song is a chronological overview of songs from the 20th century. Recorded from 1999 to 2003, the songs were originally available for download from their website Eschewing the canonical choices that would define such a chronology, LMP recorded songs ranging from the Tin Pan Alley of the turn of the century, to rap, alternative rock and dance music at the century. As such, A Century of Songs covers a multitude of genres, including plunderphonics, krautrock, happy hardcore and country.

The songs were eventually collected in a six CD-R disc box set, limited to 100 editions worldwide.

Reviews were generally positive, but some expressed bafflement at the selection of songs and the disparate styles used.

== Recording ==
With the release of their EP Aunt Canada in 1996, LMP had attempted to expand their sound. Band members Ryan Bassler and Eric Haugen felt that, far from making their own Pet Sounds, they compromised their perfectionism with budgetary concerns, technical and personal limitation. Coupled with interpersonal conflicts and a simultaneous non-existent and hostile reception in their native Champaign, Illinois, LMP settled in Evanston, a suburb north of Chicago, in 1999. The move also parsed what was a 22-person pop orchestra to core members Bassler and Haugen. In their new recording space, which they called "Eckhouse 2000", they decided to shelve current projects for a new project.

In a 2005 interview with Italian web magazine Indipop.it, Haugen said that A Century of Song was the band's attempt at "to explore a lot of different avenues of pop music and ultimately discover our own sound." This was inspired from his and Bessler's interest in constructing personas, which they refer to as "fake authenticity", alongside new band names, recording locations, and imaginary personnel." Haugen lists song poem producer Rodd Keith as an inspiration to the project as the breadth, along with limited time, meant that "the aim was simply to make a finished recording as quickly as possible, and then move on to the next."

Originally planned for a six-week recording schedule, it ended up taking 18 months. Starting in 1999, LMP posted their progress as MP3s on their official website. After uploading the final song in 2001, they moved to other projects, which included EPs The New Body Language and Meeting Up and Making Friends, and their debut album Love Conquers Alda. Because of fan demand however, LMP decided to release the sessions as a box set.

== Composition ==
As a chronology of music in the 20th century, LMP selected several songs that exemplified the time period. Songs such as "Will You Love Me Tomorrow" and "She May Call You Up Tonight" were covered in a straightforward fashion, which critic Douglas Wolk calls it covers "done in the style of... LMP themselves." However, the bulk of the album is made up of radical departures from their original forms, with songs of one genre transposed to another. "You'll Never Walk Alone" is composed as a sound collage, inspired by John Oswald, cutting in snippets of songs to form the lyrics. Hits of '69" is a stylistic cover of the Stars on 45, as a pastiche of the form and as a medley of songs of that year. An exception is "C' Howard's Gum Has the Power of Taste, an original song in the style of radio commercials of the fifties.

== Release ==
When recording on A Century of Song ended in 2002, LMP planned on releasing the set in December of that year. Because of production delays, LMP decided to postpone the release to another date. By November 2003, the box set was still delayed, but by March 2004, it was moved to April 20 of that year. The reason given was a break from recording and moving to another studio space in Chicago. Eventually A Century of Song was finally released to online orders in November 2004.

Each box set came with six CD-Rs; discs one through five contained the original project, and the sixth bonus materials, including outtakes, remixes, and other unreleased materials. They came with 132 pages of liner notes, both enclosed in hand-made plastic boxes.

== Reception ==
Professional ratings
Review scores
Source	Rating
Allmusic	4.5/5 stars

Critical reception of A Century of Song was positive, applauding LMP for their inventive covers of pop songs. Michaelangelo Matos of The Village Voice said that what LMP "lack in suavity and flair they make up for with sheer doggedness and idea mongering." Douglas Wolk of Seattle Weekly had the same sentiment that, despite the lack of polish, "it sounds like everyone's having a great time." Much of the negative criticism was levied at the nature of the box set's release, with Greg Adams of Allmusic stating that it was disappointing "that more people won't hear it."

== Track listing ==
Disc 1: 1900-1922
No.	Title	Writer(s)	Original artist	Length
1.	"A Bird in a Gilded Cage (1900)"	Arthur J. Lamb, Harry Von Tilzer	Arthur J. Lamb, Harry Von Tilzer	2:20
2.	"She's Getting Mo' Like the White Folks Every Day (1901)"	George Walker, Bert Williams	George Walker, Bert Williams	3:13
3.	"Bill Bailey, Won't You Please Come Home? (1902)"	Hughie Cannon	Hughie Cannon	6:42
4.	"Sweet Adeline (1903)"	Harry Armstrong, Richard Husch Gerard	Harry Armstrong, Richard Husch Gerard	3:38
5.	"Humming Chorus (1904)"	Giacomo Puccini	Giacomo Puccini	3:05
6.	"My Gal Sal (1905)"	Paul Dresser	Paul Dresser	2:28
7.	"You're a Grand Old Flag (1906)"	George M. Cohan	George M. Cohan	2:46
8.	"ZIZ (1907)"	Alfred Feltman	Alfred Feltman	2:50
9.	"Shine On Harvest Moon (1908)"	Nora Bayes, Jack Norworth	Nora Bayes, Jack Norworth	2:52
10.	"By the Light of the Silvery Moon (1909)"	Gus Edwards, Edward Madden	Lillian Lorraine	2:24
11.	"Come Josephine in My Flying Machine (1910)"	Alfred Bryan, Fred Fisher	Blanche Ring	3:07
12.	"Alexander's Ragtime Band (1911)"	Irving Berlin	Collins & Harlan	2:51
13.	"Get On the Raft With Taft (1912)"	Abe Holzmann, Harry D. Kerr	Abe Holzmann, Harry D. Kerr	1:14
14.	"He'd Have to Get Under - Get Out and Get Under - to Fix Up His Automobile (1913)"	Maurice Abrahams, Grant Clarke, Edgar Leslie	Adele Ritchie	2:50
15.	"St. Louis Blues (1914)"	W. C. Handy	W. C. Handy	4:19
16.	"Pack Up Your Troubles in Your Old Kit Bag and Smile, Smile, Smile (1915)"	Felix Powell, George Henry Powell	Felix Powell, George Henry Powell	2:00
17.	"Where Did Robinson Crusoe Go With Friday on Saturday Night? (1916)"	Sam M. Lewis, George W. Meyer, Joe Young	Sam M. Lewis, George W. Meyer, Joe Young	5:35
18.	"Tiger Rag (1917)"	Harry DeCosta, Eddie Edwards, Nick LaRocca, Henry Ragas, Tony Sbarbaro	The Original Dixieland Jazz Band	1:44
19.	"K-K-K-Katy (1918)"	Geoffrey O'Hara	Billy Murray	4:29
20.	"Alice Blue Gown (1919)"	Joseph McCarthy, Harry Tierney	Edith Day	2:32
21.	"Look For the Silver Lining (1920)"	Buddy DeSylva, Jerome Kern	Marilyn Miller	3:38
22.	"Kitten On the Keys (1921)"	Zez Confrey	Zez Confrey	1:54
23.	"I Wish I Could Shimmy Like My Sister Kate (1922)"	Armand J. Piron	Armand J. Piron	2:16
Total length:				1:10:47

Disc 2: 1923-1939
No.	Title	Writer(s)	Original artist	Length
1.	"Charleston (1923)"	James P. Johnson, Cecil Mack	James P. Johnson, Cecil Mack	4:11
2.	"Fascinating Rhythm (1924)"	George Gershwin, Ira Gershwin	George Gershwin, Ira Gershwin	5:01
3.	"Sweet Georgia Brown (1925)"	Ben Bernie, Kenneth Casey, Maceo Pinkard	Ben Bernie	7:21
4.	"Baby Face (1926)"	Harry Akst, Benny Davis	Harry Akst, Benny Davis	3:37
5.	"Ain't She Sweet? (1927)"	Milton Ager, Jack Yellen	Milton Ager, Jack Yellen	3:07
6.	"I'd Rather Be Dead and Buried in My Grave (1928)"	Bob Fuller	Bessie Smith	3:47
7.	"Tiptoe Through the Tulips (1929)"	Joe Burke, Al Dubin	Nick Lucas	3:45
8.	"Exactly Like You (1930)"	Dorothy Fields, Jimmy McHugh	Gertrude Lawrence and Harry Richman	4:33
9.	"I Found a Million Dollar Baby (1931)"	Mort Dixon, Billy Rose, Harry Warren	Fanny Brice	10:53
10.	"Isn't it Romantic? (1932)"	Lorenz Hart, Richard Rodgers	Maurice Chevalier and Jeanette MacDonald	4:19
11.	"Carioca (1933)"	Edward Eliscu, Gus Kahn, Vincent Youmans	Movita Castaneda, Alice Gentle, and Etta Moten	3:20
12.	"Anything Goes (1934)"	Cole Porter	Cole Porter	3:40
13.	"Sunday Afternoon Music (1935)"	Aaron Copland	Aaron Copland	2:00
14.	"At the Codfish Ball (1936)"	Sidney Mitchell, Lew Pollack	Shirley Temple	5:01
15.	"Let's Call the Whole Thing Off (1937)"	George Gershwin, Ira Gershwin	Fred Astaire and Ginger Rogers	3:26
16.	"Back in the Saddle Again (1938)"	Gene Autry, Ray Whitley	Gene Autry	2:23
17.	"We'll Meet Again (1939)"	Hughie Charles, Ross Parker	Vera Lynn	4:01
Total length:				1:14:25

Disc 3: 1940-1959
No.	Title	Writer(s)	Original artist	Length
1.	"You Are My Sunshine (1940)"	Jimmie Davis, Charles Mitchell	Jimmie Davis	3:12
2.	"Chattanooga Choo-Choo (1941)"	Mack Gordon, Harry Warren	Glenn Miller and His Orchestra	3:46
3.	"Don't Get Around Much Anymore (1942)"	Duke Ellington, Bob Russell	Duke Ellington	3:13
4.	"Spring Will Be A Little Late This Year (1943)"	Frank Loesser	Deanna Durbin	7:22
5.	"Have Yourself a Merry Little Christmas (1944)"	Ralph Blane, Hugh Martin	Judy Garland	4:47
6.	"You'll Never Walk Alone (1945)"	Rodgers and Hammerstein	Rodgers and Hammerstein	1:51
7.	"La Vie En Rose (1946)"	Louiguy, Marguerite Monnot, Édith Piaf	Édith Piaf	2:57
8.	"Smoke, Smoke, Smoke (That Cigarette) (1947)"	Merle Travis, Tex Williams	Tex Williams	3:29
9.	"Boogie Chillen (1948)"	John Lee Hooker	John Lee Hooker	2:18
10.	"Music! Music! Music! (1949)"	Bernie Baum, Stephan Weiss	Teresa Brewer	3:14
11.	"C. Howard's Gum Has the Power of Taste (1950)"	Ryan Bassler, Eric Haugen		0:20
12.	"Unforgettable (1951)"	Irving Gordon	Nat King Cole	3:31
13.	"The Family Who Prays (1952)"	Charlie Louvin, Ira Louvin	The Louvin Brothers	3:24
14.	"Siamese Cat Song (1953)"	Sonny Burke, Peggy Lee	Peggy Lee	3:42
15.	"Mr. Sandman (1954)"	Pat Ballard	The Chordettes	2:20
16.	"Singin' the Blues (1955)"	Melvin Endsley	Marty Robbins	2:56
17.	"I Could Have Danced All Night (1956)"	Alan Jay Lerner, Frederick Loewe	Julie Andrews	3:14
18.	"Whole Lotta Shakin' Goin' On (1957)"	James Faye "Roy" Hall, Dave "Curlee" Williams	Jerry Lee Lewis	4:04
19.	"Yakety Yak (1958)"	Jerry Leiber, Mike Stoller	The Coasters	2:26
20.	"So What (1959)"	Miles Davis	Miles Davis	3:09
Total length:				1:05:15

Disc 4: 1960-1981
No.	Title	Writer(s)	Original artist	Length
1.	"Will You Love Me Tomorrow? (1960)"	Gerry Goffin, Carole King	The Shirelles	3:55
2.	"Hello Mary Lou (1961)"	Cayet Mangiaracina, Gene Pitney	Ricky Nelson	3:00
3.	"Cranberry Bog (1962)"	Rose Marie McCoy & Beverly Ross	Hayley Mills	1:49
4.	"Dead Presidents (1963)"	Willie Dixon, Billy "The Kid" Emerson	Little Walter	3:33
5.	"Downtown (1964)"	Tony Hatch	Petula Clark	3:18
6.	"Do the Freddie (1965)"	Lou Courtney, Dennis Lambert	Freddie and the Dreamers	2:17
7.	"Here Comes My Baby (1966)"	Cat Stevens	The Tremeloes	2:49
8.	"She May Call You Up Tonight (1967)"	Michael Brown, Steve Martin Caro	The Left Banke	2:10
9.	"Everyday People (1968)"	Sly Stone	Sly and the Family Stone	2:24
10.	"Hits of '69 (1969)"	Various	Various	9:32
11.	"Are You Ready? (1970)"	Charlie Allen, John Hill	Pacific Gas & Electric	4:33
12.	"Maria Bethânia (1971)"	Caetano Veloso	Caetano Veloso	7:30
13.	"Theme From Deep Throat (1972)"	Unknown	Unknown	3:08
14.	"Touch Me in the Morning (1973)"	Michael Masser Ron Miller	Diana Ross	4:24
15.	"Good Times (1974)"	Alan Bergman, Marilyn Bergman, Dave Grusin	Jim Gilstrap and Blinky Williams	2:20
16.	"'39 (1975)"	Brian May	Queen (band)	4:05
17.	"Gonna Fly Now (1976)"	Carol Connors, Bill Conti, Ayn Robbins	Bill Conti	2:47
18.	"Sound and Vision (1977)"	David Bowie	David Bowie	4:24
19.	"Hybrid Moments (1978)"	Glenn Danzig	The Misfits	2:12
20.	"You Can't Change That (1979)"	Ray Parker Jr.	Raydio	2:58
21.	"Xanadu (1980)"	Jeff Lynne	Olivia Newton-John and Electric Light Orchestra	3:30
22.	"Feelin' Good (1981)"	Jill Gallina	Jill Gallina	2:51
Total length:				1:19:29

Disc 5: 1982-2001
No.	Title	Writer(s)	Original artist	Length
1.	"Nobody (1982)"	Kye Fleming, Dennis Morgan	Sylvia	4:38
2.	"Faithfully (1983)"	Jonathan Cain	Journey	2:57
3.	"I Want to Know What Love Is (1984)"	Mick Jones	Foreigner	5:33
4.	"We Built This City (1985)"	Dennis Lambert, Martin Page, Bernie Taupin, Peter Wolf	Starship	3:27
5.	"If You Leave (1986)"	Martin Cooper, Paul Humphreys, Andy McCluskey	Orchestral Manoeuvres in the Dark	2:18
6.	"Pop Goes the World (1987)"	Ivan Doroschuk	Men Without Hats	2:28
7.	"Children's Story (1988)"	Slick Rick	Slick Rick	3:58
8.	"Happy Birthday (1989)"	Johnette Napolitano	Concrete Blonde	2:05
9.	"Sadeness, Part I (1990)"	Michael Cretu, Fabrice Cuitad, Frank Peterson	Enigma	4:39
10.	"Nothing Else Matters (1991)"	James Hetfield, Lars Ulrich	Metallica	6:42
11.	"Love U More (1992)"	Paul Carnell, Lucia Holm	Sunscreem	3:50
12.	"Lucas With the Lid Off (1993)"	Nacio Herb Brown, Arthur Freed, Lasse Jensen, Zany King, Lucas Secon	Lucas	4:33
13.	"La Chica del Apartamento 512 (1994)"	Samuel "Sammy" Morales, A.B. Quintanilla, Ricky Vela	Selena	2:51
14.	"Only Happy When it Rains (1995)"	Duke Erikson, Shirley Manson, Steve Marker, Butch Vig	Garbage	3:21
15.	"If It Makes You Happy (1996)"	Sheryl Crow, Jeff Trott	Sheryl Crow	4:58
16.	"Chan Chan (1997)"	Compay Segundo	Buena Vista Social Club	4:22
17.	"Aquarius (1998)"	Marcus Eoin, Michael Sandison	Boards of Canada	5:07
18.	"Unpretty (1999)"	Dallas Austin, Tionne Watkins	TLC	4:56
19.	"A Century of Song (2000)"	Bassler, Haugen		3:23
20.	"Does Anyone Remember A Century of Song? (2001)"	Bassler, Haugen		2:28
Total length:				1:18:34

Disc 6: Holus-bolus
No.	Title	Writer(s)	Length
1.	"Back to A Century of Song (2002)"	Bassler, Haugen	1:38
2.	"Bill Bailey, Won't You Please Come Home? (Scratchbox Demo Edit)"		2:17
3.	"Bill Bailey, Won't You Please Come Home? (Edit)"		3:35
4.	"Sweet Adeline (Alternate Vocal Edit)"		1:23
5.	"You're a Grand Old Flag (Outtake Version Edit)"		1:32
6.	"ZIZ (First Section Uncut)"		1:47
7.	"ZIZ (Second Section Uncut)"		1:32
8.	"Charleston (Scratchbox Demo Edit)"		2:29
9.	"Sweet Georgia Brown (Edit)"		3:47
10.	"Sweet Georgia Brown (Bonus Beats)"		1:22
11.	"Ain't She Sweet (Edit)"		2:35
12.	"I'd Rather Be Dead and Buried in My Grave (Alternate Vocal)"		4:21
13.	"Tiptoe Through the Tulips (Scratchbox Demo)"		0:53
14.	"Anything Goes (Part 2)"		0:42
15.	"Let's Call the Whole Thing Off (First Vocal Take)"		0:35
16.	"Have Yourself a Merry Little Christmas (Outtake Version)"		2:51
17.	"Music! Music! Music! (Jackass Track Edit)"		1:20
18.	"Twisted (1950 Outtake Edit)"		0:46
19.	"The Family Who Prays (Scratch Vocal Take)"		2:07
20.	"Mr. Sandman (Vocal Version)"		2:26
21.	"Hello Mary Lou (Duh Hey Mix)"		0:53
22.	"Theme From Deep Throat (Jackass Track Edit)"		0:43
23.	"Good Times (Original Mix)"		3:19
24.	"The Rose (1979 outtake)"		3:22
25.	"Xanadu (Vocal Session Montage)"		2:50
26.	"Xanadub"		3:35
27.	"Nobody (Original Mix Edit)"		0:45
28.	"We Built This City (Intro Vocals)"		0:18
29.	"We Built This City (Full Version)"		4:01
30.	"We Built This City (Farm Report)"		0:19
31.	"I Remember You (1989 Outtake)"		5:13
32.	"Unpretty (Edit)"		3:49
33.	"A Century of Song (Demo Edit)"		1:11
34.	"Does Anyone Remember A Century of Song? (Scratchbox Demo)"		2:38
35.	"Century Megamix"		7:55
Total length:			1:20:49
