= Cavalcade (1933 film) =

1933 film

- Theatrical poster
- Directed by: Frank Lloyd
- Screenplay by: Reginald Berkeley
- Based on: Cavalcade (1931 play) by Noël Coward
- Produced by: Frank Lloyd
- Starring: Diana Wynyard; Clive Brook; Una O'Connor; Irene Browne; Herbert Mundin; Frank Lawton; Merle Tottenham; Beryl Mercer
- Cinematography: Ernest Palmer
- Edited by: Margaret Clancey
- Music by: Peter Brunelli; Louis De Francesco; Arthur Lange; J. S. Zamecnik
- Distributed by: Fox Film Corporation
- Release dates: January 5, 1933 (New York City, premiere); April 15, 1933 (US)
- Running time: 112 minutes
- Country: United States
- Language: English
- Budget: $1,180,280
- Box office: $1,004,000 (domestic rentals) $3.5 million (worldwide rentals)

Cavalcade is a 1933 American pre-Code epic drama film directed by Frank Lloyd. The screenplay by Reginald Berkeley is based on Noël Coward's 1931 play. It was produced and distributed by Fox Film Corporation, and stars Diana Wynyard and Clive Brook in the leading roles.

The story presents a view of English life during the first third of the 20th century from New Year's Eve 1899 to New Year's Day 1933, from the point of view of well-to-do London residents Jane and Robert Marryot, their children, their close friends, and their servants. Several historical events affect the lives of the characters or serve as background for the film, including the Second Boer War, the death of Queen Victoria, the sinking of the RMS Titanic, and World War I. Throughout the film, the passage of years is indicated by dates on title cards, with a Medieval cavalcade marching in the background.

The film premiered on January 5, 1933, and went into general release on April 15. It was both a critical and commercial success, and won three Oscars at the 6th Academy Awards, including for Best Picture and Best Director.

== Plot ==
On the last day of 1899, Jane and Robert Marryot, an upper-class couple, return to their townhouse in a fashionable area of London before midnight, so they can keep their tradition of celebrating the new year with a midnight toast. Jane worries because Robert has joined the City of London Imperial Volunteers (CIV) as an officer, and will soon be leaving to serve in the Second Boer War. The Marryots' butler Alfred Bridges has joined the CIV as a private and is also leaving soon. His wife Ellen, the Marryots' maid, worries about what will become of her and their new baby Fanny if Alfred is killed or seriously injured. At midnight, the Marryot and Bridges families ring in the new century while Cook dances with other revelers in the street. While Robert is away at war, Jane's friend Margaret Harris keeps her company and gives her emotional support. Robert and Alfred return home unharmed and Robert is knighted for his service.

Alfred announces that he has bought his own pub with money partly provided by Robert, and he and Ellen will be leaving service and moving to a flat. As the downstairs staff have a cup of tea to celebrate Alfred's return, they receive news of the death of Queen Victoria.

A few years later, Alfred has developed alcoholism and is managing the pub poorly. Ellen plans a genteel social evening when Jane Marryot and her son Edward, who is now in college at Oxford, pay a visit to the Bridgeses' flat. Ellen does not tell Alfred about the visit and lies to the Marryots that he can't attend due to a leg injury. Alfred shows up drunk, acts rudely and destroys a doll that Jane had given Fanny, causing Fanny to run away. Alfred chases Fanny into the street, where he is fatally run over by a horse-drawn fire engine.

The following year, Ellen and Fanny Bridges encounter the Marryot family at the seaside, where Ellen and Fanny are living off the proceeds from the pub, now owned by Ellen. Fanny has become a talented dancer and singer. Edward Marryot has fallen in love with his childhood playmate Edith Harris. The family witnesses the historic flight by Louis Blériot over the English Channel. Edward and Edith marry and subsequently die in the sinking of the RMS Titanic.

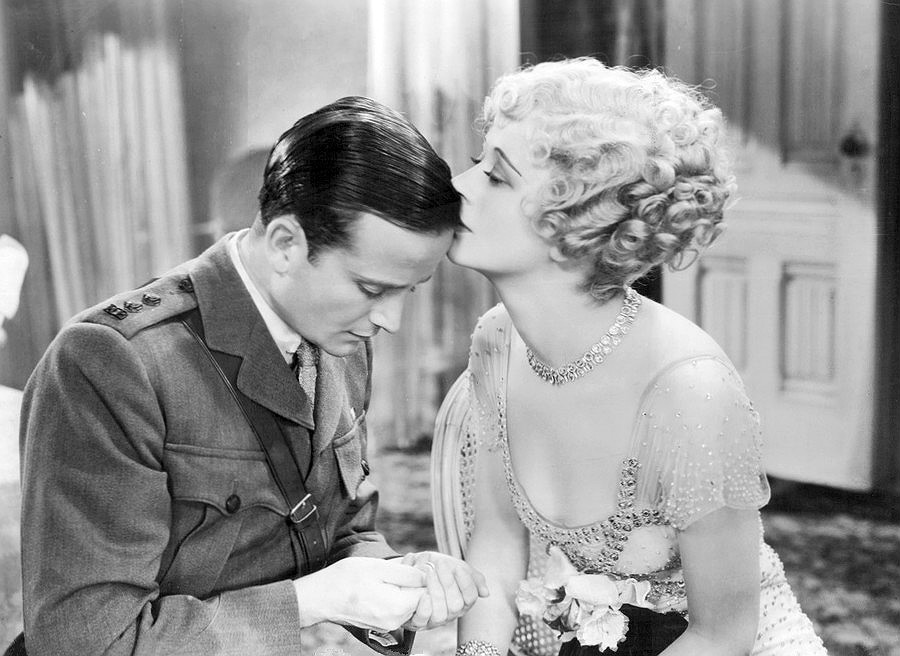
Fanny and Joe

Robert and Joe Marryot both serve as officers in World War I. While on leave, Joe reconnects with Fanny Bridges, now a performer in a nightclub. Fanny and Joe fall in love and Joe spends most of his leave time with her, unbeknownst to his parents. He proposes, but she hesitates to accept due to the difference in their social classes. Just after armistice is announced in 1918, Ellen reveals the affair to Jane and demands that Joe marry Fanny when he returns. While Jane and Ellen argue, Jane receives a telegram informing her that Joe has been killed in battle.

The film ends on New Year's Day 1933, with Jane and Robert, now elderly, carrying on their tradition of celebrating the new year with a midnight toast to their memories, as well as to the future.

== Cast ==
- Diana Wynyard as Jane Marryot
- Clive Brook as Robert Marryot
- Una O'Connor as Ellen Bridges
- Herbert Mundin as Alfred Bridges
- Beryl Mercer as Cook
- Irene Browne as Margaret Harris
- Tempe Pigott as Mrs. Snapper
- Merle Tottenham as Annie
- Frank Lawton as Joe Marryot
- Ursula Jeans as Fanny Bridges
- Margaret Lindsay as Edith Harris
- John Warburton as Edward Marryot
- Billy Bevan as George Grainger
- Ronnie James as Desmond Roberts
- Dick Henderson, Jr. as Young Master Edward
- Douglas Scott as Young Master Joey
- Sheila MacGill as Young Edith
- Bonita Granville as Young Fanny
- Claude King as Speaker
- Brandon Hurst as Actor (uncredited)
- Will Stanton as Tommy Jolly (uncredited)

== Production ==
Fox Movietone newsreel cameramen were sent to London to record the original stage production as a guide for the film adaptation.

Frank Borzage was originally going to direct, but he departed in June 1932 to work on another project. Fox production head Winfield Sheehan decided to use a British director due to the film's setting, and Lanarkshire-born Frank Lloyd was brought on board. Production took place from early October to November 29, 1932.

The film was one of the first to use the words "damn" and "hell", as in "Hell of a lot". These had been used in the play. There was concern at the Hays Office that this could set a precedent. Fox president Sidney Kent was quoted saying the mild profanity "could not offend any person; and, after all, that was the real purpose of the Code. And as far as the use creating a precedent which might be followed by other producers is concerned, the best answer would be that anyone who could make a picture as good as Cavalcade might be justified in following the precedent." The precedent was codified by the Hays Office six years later, in advance of the release of Gone with the Wind, which features the most famous use of "damn" in an early American film.

The film premiered in New York City on January 5, 1933, but did not go into general theatrical release until April 15.

== Soundtrack ==
In addition to several original compositions by Coward, more than fifty popular songs, national anthems, hymns, ballads, and topical tunes relevant to the years portrayed were used in the film. Songs appearing in the film include:

- "Girls of the C.I.V.", "Mirabelle", "Lover of My Dreams", and "Twentieth Century Blues", all by Noël Coward
- "God Save the Queen"
- "Auld Lang Syne" by Robert Burns
- "Goodbye, Dolly Gray" by Will D. Cobb and Paul Barnes
- "Soldiers of the Queen" by Leslie Stuart
- "Land of Hope and Glory" by Edward Elgar
- "A Bird in a Gilded Cage" by Arthur J. Lamb and Harry von Tilzer
- "Emperor Waltz" by Johann Strauss II
- "I Do Like to Be Beside the Seaside" by John A. Glover-Kind
- "Take Me Back to Yorkshire" by Harry Castling and Fred Godfrey
- "The Blue Danube" by Johann Strauss II
- "Nearer, My God, to Thee" by Lowell Mason
- "I'll Make a Man of You" by Arthur Wimperis and Herman Finck
- "Your King and Country Want You" by Paul Rubens
- "It's a Long Way to Tipperary" by Jack Judge and Harry Williams
- "Pack Up Your Troubles in Your Old Kit-Bag and Smile, Smile, Smile" by Felix Powell and George Asaf
- "Keep The Home Fires Burning" by Ivor Novello and Lena Guilbert Ford
- "Oh, You Beautiful Doll" by Nat Ayer and Seymour Brown
- "Mademoiselle from Armentières (Hinky Dinky Parley Voo)" by Irwin Dash, Al Dubin, and Joe Mittenthal
- "When Johnny Comes Marching Home" by Louis Lambert
- "Over There" by George M. Cohan

== Reception ==
=== Box office ===
Cavalcade was an instant commercial success, earning $1,004,000 in North American rentals, and $3.5 million in worldwide rentals. It made over US$1 million in the UK. It ended up making an estimated profit of £2,500,000 during its initial theatrical release.

=== Critical reception ===
Mordaunt Hall of The New York Times called the film "most affecting and impressive" and added, "In all its scenes there is a meticulous attention to detail, not only in the settings ... but also in the selection of players ... It is unfurled with such marked good taste and restraint that many an eye will be misty after witnessing this production."

The film was reportedly Adolf Hitler's favorite film. During 1934, he and Joseph Goebbels, director of Nazi propaganda films, watched the film twice in March and May.

The film holds a 67% approval rating on the review aggregation website Rotten Tomatoes based on 36 reviews, with an average rating of 5.90/10. The site's consensus reads: "Though solidly acted and pleasant to look at, Cavalcade lacks cohesion, and sacrifices true emotion for mawkishness." On Metacritic, the film holds a weighted average score of 73 out of 100 based on 13 critics, indicating "generally favorable" reviews.

=== Awards and nominations ===
Award	Category	Nominee(s)	Result	Ref.
Academy Awards	Outstanding Production	Fox Film	Won	
Academy Awards	Best Director	Frank Lloyd	Won	
Academy Awards	Best Actress	Diana Wynyard	Nominated	
Academy Awards	Best Art Direction	William S. Darling	Won	
National Board of Review Awards	Top Ten Films		3rd Place	

Cavalcade was the first film produced by Fox Film to win the Academy Award for Best Picture, and the only one before it merged with 20th Century Pictures in 1935 to form 20th Century Fox.

== Preservation ==
The Academy Film Archive preserved Cavalcade in 2002.

== Home media ==
Cavalcade was released on a US VHS in 1993.

Cavalcade was initially released on DVD December 7, 2010, as the earliest entry in the 75-film, three-volume "Twentieth Century Fox 75th Anniversary Collection", a prestige set with an initial list price of nearly $500. With the DVD and Blu-ray releases of Wings on January 24, 2012, Cavalcade became the only Best Picture Oscar winner not available on a stand-alone DVD in Region 1.

It was eventually released separately on a US Blu-ray/DVD set on August 6, 2013, after it received the most write-in votes in a Fox online poll.

The film is also available for rental or purchase in HD on various US-restricted digital services.

As of May 2019, these are the only official home video releases of Cavalcade anywhere, though several bootlegs are available, most notably a poor-quality DVD and BD-R from Spain.

== Copyright status ==
Due to being a film published in 1933, it will enter the public domain on January 1, 2029.

== Bibliography ==
- Glancy, H. Mark.When Hollywood Loved Britain: The Hollywood 'British' Film 1939–1945. Manchester University Press, 1999.
