= So This Is Love (film) =

1953 film by Gordon Douglas

- Directed by: Gordon Douglas
- Written by: John Monks Jr.
- Based on: You're Only Human Once; 1944 book by Grace Moore
- Produced by: Henry Blanke
- Starring: Kathryn Grayson; Merv Griffin; Joan Weldon; Walter Abel; Rosemary DeCamp; Jeff Donnell
- Cinematography: Robert Burks
- Edited by: Folmar Blangsted
- Music by: Ray Heindorf; Max Steiner
- Production company: Warner Bros. Pictures
- Distributed by: Warner Bros. Pictures
- Release date: July 29, 1953
- Running time: 100 or 104 minutes
- Country: United States
- Language: English
- Box office: $1.75 million (US)

So This Is Love (subtitled The Grace Moore Story) is a 1953 American musical drama film directed by Gordon Douglas, based on the life of singer Grace Moore. The film stars Kathryn Grayson as Moore, and Merv Griffin as her boyfriend Buddy. The story chronicles Moore's rise to stardom from 1918 to February 7, 1928, when she made her debut at the Metropolitan Opera House.

== Plot ==
Grace Moore (Kathryn Grayson) dreams of being a great opera singer. She starts out singing at a nightclub, where she meets her boyfriend Buddy (Merv Griffin). She takes singing lessons, and Buddy pressures her to marry him and move out of the city. Grace, however, cannot give up on her career.

At one point her dreams may be dashed, as poor singing instruction has inflamed her vocal cords. Under the direction of a new, better voice coach, she is told to rest and not speak for three months. She does so, but Buddy Nash marries another woman while Grace is secluded in a cabin.

Upon Grace's return to New York City, she is able to sing again and continues her lessons. She is hired as an understudy in a musical and takes over when the leading lady (Marie Windsor) falls ill. Grace's performance impresses the producers so much that she is made a star on Broadway. Her next boyfriend, Bryan Curtis (Douglas Dick), dates her for two years before insisting they marry, to which Grace agrees.

When Grace auditions for the Metropolitan Opera, she is told that she lacks experience and that her youth, charm and voice are better suited to musical comedies. She wagers Otto Kahn (Roy Gordon), the Manager of Metropolitan Opera, that she will perform there within two years. She quits her musical contract and books passage to Europe in order to get better vocal training. Bryan says he cannot compete with her dream and ends their engagement.

Two years later, Grace has returned, and sings in a starring role at the Metropolitan. She is a success, and has finally achieved her dream to be an opera star.

== Cast ==
- Kathryn Grayson as Grace Moore
- Merv Griffin as Buddy Nash
- Joan Weldon as Ruth Obre
- Walter Abel as Colonel James Moore
- Rosemary DeCamp as Aunt Laura Stokley
- Jeff Donnell as Henrietta Van Dyke
- Douglas Dick as Bryan Curtis
- Ann Doran as Mrs. Moore
- Margaret Field as Edna Wallace
- Mabel Albertson as Mary Garden
- Fortunio Bonanova as Dr. Marafioti
- Marie Windsor as Marilyn Montgomery
- Noreen Corcoran as 8 year old Grace Moore
- William Bakewell as Charles
- William Boyett as George Gershwin
- Lillian Bronson as Mrs. Green
- Robert Carson as Policeman
- Tristram Coffin as Frank Boland
- Franklyn Farnum as Concertgoer
- Frank Ferguson as Commencement Speaker
- Roy Glenn as Churchgoer
- Roy Gordon as Otto Kahn
- Wilton Graff as Henry Erlanger
- Kathryn Grant as Showgirl
- Jester Hairston as Preacher
- Creighton Hale as Passerby
- John Hamilton as Charlie
- Olin Howland as Mailman
- Fred Kelsey as Ship Passenger
- Colin Kenny as Audition Man
- Wilbur Mack as Operagoer
- Charles Meredith as Artur Bodanzky
- Moroni Olsen as Arnold Reuben
- Barbara Pepper as Nightclub Girl
- Mario Siletti as Giulio Gatti-Casazza
- Dick Simmons as Actor
- Arthur Space as Director
- Dorothy Vernon as Reveler
- Herb Vigran as Nightclub M.C.
- Nedrick Young as Harry Corbett

According to her 1959 autobiography My Story, actress Mary Astor wrote that in late 1952, she had been initially cast by Warner Bros. Pictures in So This Is Love (then titled The Grace Moore Story) for the role of Aunt Laura Stokley. Before actual filming began, Astor had even made some camera tests but had to bow out of the film after breaking her leg from a fall in her home. The role went to Rosemary DeCamp. (My Story: An Autobiography by Mary Astor pgs. 219-220 Windham Press)

== Release ==
So This Is Love was the first major film to premiere in Tennessee, Moore's home state.

== Soundtrack ==
So This Is Love

Soundtrack album by Kathryn Grayson, Merv Griffin, Noreen Corcoran and Max Steiner (uncredited)
- Released: 1953
- Genre: Soundtrack
- Label: MCA

So This Is Love is a jukebox musical. The soundtrack consists of various songs from multiple composers. Songs such as "Remember" by Irving Berlin and "Pack Up Your Troubles..." by Felix Powell and George Henry Powell were released prior to and not written for the film.

=== Track listing ===
1. "Voi, Che Sapete" – Kathryn Grayson
2. "Time On My Hands" – Kathryn Grayson
3. "The Tickle Toe" – Kathryn Grayson
4. "The Kiss Waltz" – Kathryn Grayson
5. "Remember" – Kathryn Grayson
6. "Oh Me! Oh My!" – Kathryn Grayson
7. "I Wish I Could Shimmy Like My Sister Kate" – Kathryn Grayson
8. "Ciribiribin" – Kathryn Grayson
9. "Ah! Je Ris De Me Voir Si Belle (The Jewel Song)" – Kathryn Grayson
10. "Christ The Lord Is Risen Today"
11. "I Kiss Your Hand, Madame" – Merv Griffin
12. "I'm Just Wild About Harry"
13. "In Dat Great Gittin' Up Morning" – Noreen Corcoran
14. "Je Veux Vivre (Juliet's Waltz Song)" – Kathryn Grayson
15. "Memories"
16. "Pack Up Your Troubles in Your Old Kit Bag and Smile, Smile, Smile!"
17. "Si, Mi Chiamano Mimi (Mimi's Aria)" – Kathryn Grayson
18. "So This is Love"
