= G. H. Elliott =

British music hall singer and dancer

G. H. Elliott

George Henry Elliott (3 November 1882 – 19 November 1962) was a British music hall singer and dancer. Known as "The Chocolate Coloured Coon", he performed with a painted brown face and dressed entirely in white: white top hat, white tail-coat which came down well below the knees, white gloves, white tie or cravat, white trousers, white shoes and white cane.

== Life and career ==
He was born George Henry Elliott in Rochdale, Lancashire, in 1882. He and his family emigrated to the United States when he was four. There he played juvenile parts on stage including the title role in Little Lord Fauntleroy. He was a member of the Primrose and West Minstrels at the age of nine where he first blacked up, in a style considered at the time to be a "thoroughly respectable form of music hall and seaside entertainment". Unlike earlier performers who blacked their face while colouring their lips white, Elliott used a more naturalistic "chocolate coloured" make-up over his face and lips, giving him his unique bill matter.

In 1901 the family returned to Britain, where he continued to perform on the music hall stage. He made his London debut on 10 March 1902 at Sadler's Wells Theatre. After a number of years treading the boards he rose to top of the bill. He was influenced by Eugene Stratton, who also used to black up, and he sang some of Stratton's songs, particularly "Lily of Laguna", which he sang in tribute to his hero. Among the songs particularly associated with him are "Idaho", "The Honeysuckle and the Bee", "I Used to Sigh for the Silvery Moon" and "Sue, Sue, Sue", many written by Herman Darewski and Lester Barrett. He made over 100 records, his first on a wax cylinder in 1904 and his last in 1960. In 1912 and 1914, he was the best-selling recording artist for His Master's Voice.

As a popular light comedian, Elliott appeared in three Royal Variety Performances, in 1925, 1948 and 1958. He toured as a top of the bill variety performer through the 1930s, and also occasionally broadcast on BBC radio. He appeared in one film only, Music Hall (1934); a blackface singer who performed "Lily of Laguna" in Those Were the Days (1934) was purported to be Elliott but was not him. In 1948, he topped the bill in Don Ross's successful touring show, Thanks for the Memory, and he continued to perform on subsequent tours in the 1950s. He made several appearances in television variety shows and was the subject of This Is Your Life in 1957 when he was surprised by Eamonn Andrews at the King's Theatre in Hammersmith, London (located at 178-180 Hammersmith Road and demolished in 1963).

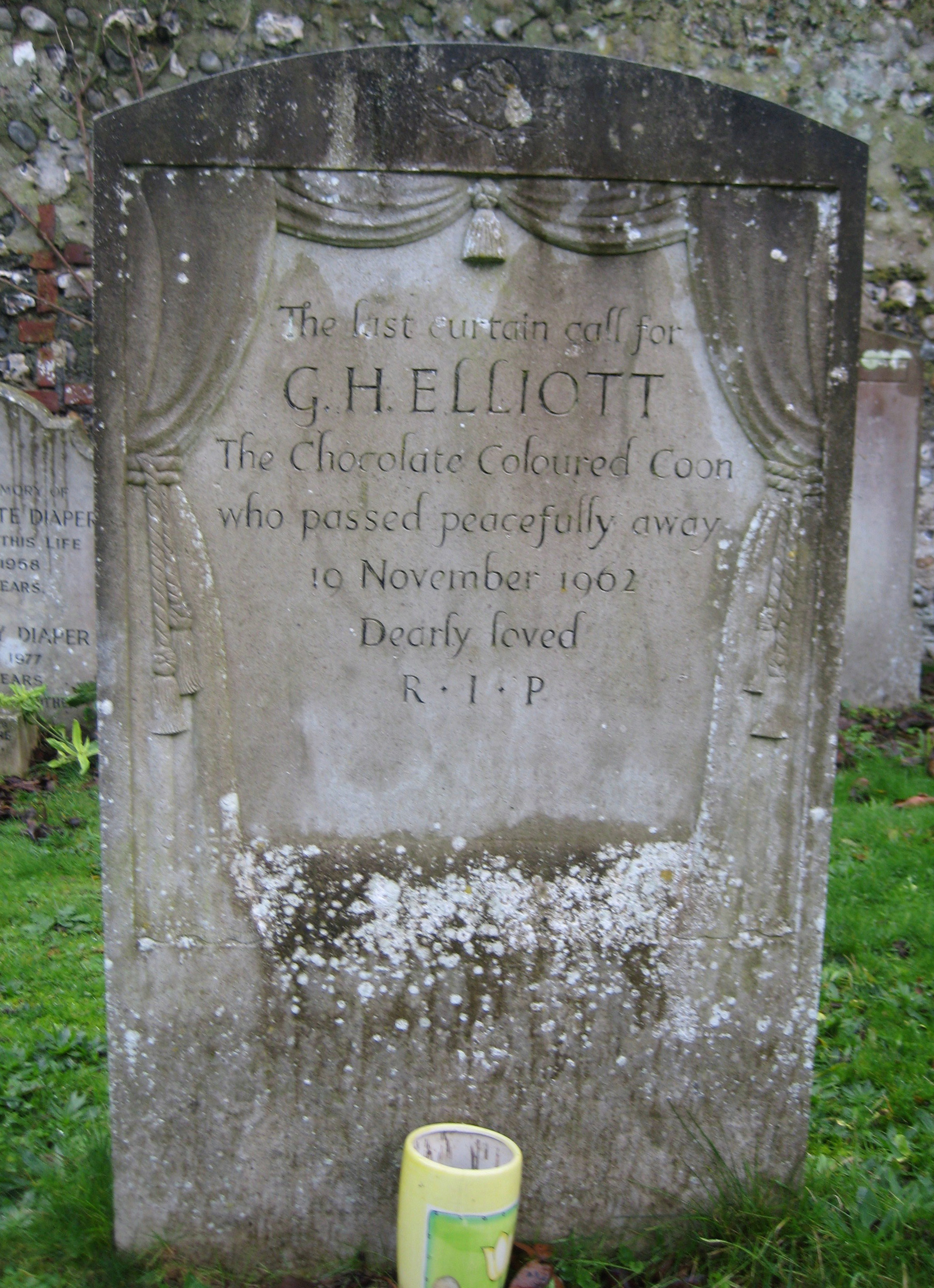
Headstone in St. Margaret's Churchyard, Rottingdean, prior to its removal

He was married twice, first in 1913 to Emily Hayes, who died in 1940 after years of alcoholism; and then in 1943 to Florence May Street, known as June. She had been an acrobat in acts as various as the Martinez Troupe/Duo, and Sereno (Harry Sereno) and June.

Elliott continued to work occasionally until about 1960, but after a stroke retired to Rottingdean, near Brighton in Sussex, where he lived in a cottage he named "Silvery Moon" after his song "I Used to Sigh for the Silvery Moon". He died in 1962, shortly after his 80th birthday, and was buried in the churchyard of St Margaret's Church, Rottingdean.

His gravestone shows a stage with curtains drawn back, and bears the words: "The last curtain call for G H Elliott the Chocolate Coloured Coon who died 19 November 1962. Dearly loved R.I.P". Because of sensitivities over the wording, the memorial was removed to a safe location in June 2020.

== Bibliography ==
Elliott, June: Sawdust to Stardust; Elliott, G.H.: Chocolate & Cream; Malvern Link: G. Higgins, 2001.
