= You Will Remember =

1941 British musical drama film

- Directed by: Jack Raymond
- Written by: Lydia Hayward; Christopher Morley; Sewell Stokes
- Produced by: Charles Q. Steel
- Starring: Robert Morley; Emlyn Williams; Dorothy Hyson
- Cinematography: Henry Harris
- Edited by: Peggy Hennessey
- Music by: Percival Mackey
- Production company: Jack Raymond Productions
- Distributed by: British Lion
- Release date: 8 February 1941
- Running time: 86 minutes
- Country: United Kingdom
- Language: English

You Will Remember is a 1941 British musical drama film directed by Jack Raymond and starring Robert Morley, Emlyn Williams and Dorothy Hyson. It portrays the life of the composer Leslie Stuart. Featured songs include "Tell Me Pretty Maiden", "Sue", "Florodora", "Lily of Laguna", "Soldiers of the King" and "Dolly Daydream".

The title stems from the master of ceremonies in the British music halls who would say "You will remember (this song)" when introducing old favourites.

== Plot ==
The film is a biography of popular English composer Tom Barrett known by his stage name Leslie Stuart, who rose to fame through performances of his songs by the actress and singer Ellaline Terriss. The story is told in flashback with an elderly Barrett listening to a band playing his tunes played by a band on a pier. The woman next to him confidently tells him that the composer is dead.

We then go to his childhood, Manchester in 1870, where his relatively poor parents buy him a piano. He proves to be a prodigy. His first break comes in a small hall/bar where the regular piano player falls ill and he is asked to play Stephen Foster tunes. In later life he earns money teaching piano but is not satisfied. He goes to a concert by Signor Foli (actually an Irishman called Foley) and they become friends. Foley convinces him to start writing songs full time but under a new name.

Despite growing success he is not good with money. Others are also printing his work without permission. This is partly addressed by the Copyright Act but is not enough to save him from debtors prison. Leaving prison a day late (so he can finish reading a book on Beethoven) he descends to obscurity with the arrival of the Jazz Age.

Through good times and bad his childhood friend Bob Slater stands by him, and encourages him back into society. He has a comeback in British music halls shortly before his death.

== Cast ==
- Robert Morley as Tom Barrett / Leslie Stuart
- Emlyn Williams as Bob Slater
- Dorothy Hyson as Ellaline Terriss
- Tom E. Finglass as Eugene Stratton
- Nicholas Phipps as Earl of Potter
- Gertrude Musgrove as Polly Potter
- Charles Lefeaux as Mr Carr
- Allan Jeayes as Signor Foli
- Charles Victor as Pat Barrett
- Maire O'Neill as Mrs Barrett
- Maurice Kelly as young Tom Barrett
- Roddy McDowall as young Bob Slater
- Marie Ault as bit role
- Muriel George as Manchester landlady
- James Harcourt as Judge
- Mary Merrall as London landlady
- Johnnie Schofield as sheet music seller

== Production ==
The film was made at Isleworth Studios, with art direction was by James A. Carter.

== Critical reception ==
The Monthly Film Bulletin wrote: "If the film is based on fact it is to be commended for its courageous presentation of the less praiseworthy aspects of the composer's life. Robert Morley makes of Barrett, later known as Leslie Stuart, a likeable figure, though the part calls for little dramatic ability. Emlyn Williams makes the most of a small but ultimately significant part, and there is a delicious study of a peer-hunting chorus girl of the period by Gertrude Musgrove."

Kine Weekly wrote: "The complete impression, quietly amplified by sensitive and accurate acting on the part of Robert Morley, is agreeable popular entertainment. ... In short, biography is handled with showmanlike regard for immediate box oftice needs."

Allmovie wrote, "Jack Raymond's perfunctory direction does not always do full justice to his subject."

TV Guide noted, "production numbers featuring the singing of music-hall performer Finglass are well done, overcoming the weaknesses of the sentimental screenplay."

In British Sound Films: The Studio Years 1928–1959 David Quinlan rated the film as "average", writing: "Well-acted but low-key biopic."
