= Tom Finglass =

Irish-born British entertainer (1879–1957)

Thomas Patrick Finglass (17 November 1879 – 31 May 1957) was an Irish blackface tenor who had a successful career in British music hall. He was sometimes billed as The Ideal Coon. He played the legendary blackface performer Eugene Stratton (1861–1918) in the 1940 film You Will Remember which tells the story of songwriter Leslie Stuart's (1863–1928) life.

== Biography ==
Finglass was born in Dublin. In 1930, he teamed up with songwriter Fred Godfrey to create a variety act featuring Godfrey's hit songs. Finglass would sing while Godfrey played the piano. The act was extremely successful and topped the bill at venues in the 1930s.

Finglass retired from regular performing in the late 1930s and subsequently made his living in London as a hairdresser. He appeared in the 1943 film Variety Jubilee, playing Eugene Stratton. The film depicts life in a London music hall from 1892 to the 1940s. He also came out of retirement briefly in 1950 to portray Stratton once more in a BBC tribute to that singer.

He died in Forest Hill, London, and was survived by his wife, Irene.
