= Lucas with the Lid Off =

1994 single by Lucas Secon

Single by Lucas

from the album Lucacentric
- Released: 1994
- Genre: Jazz rap; electro swing
- Length: 4:02
- Label: Big Beat
- Songwriters: Nacio Herb Brown; Arthur Freed; Lasse Jensen; Lucas Secon; Zany King
- Producers: Lucas; Illinton

Lucas singles chronology
"Wau Wau Wau" (1994)	"Lucas with the Lid Off" (1994)	"CityZen" (1994)

"Lucas with the Lid Off" is a song by Danish rapper Lucas Secon that was released as the lead single from his second album, Lucacentric (1994). It features a sample from the 1935 Benny Goodman song "When Buddha Smiles". The song was a hit in the United States, reaching number 29 on the Billboard Hot 100 and number 22 on the Billboard Modern Rock Tracks chart. It was most successful in Australia, where it reached number 15, and it peaked within the top 40 in Canada, Iceland, New Zealand, and the United Kingdom.

The music video for the song was directed by the French filmmaker Michel Gondry and was nominated for a Grammy Award for Best Music Video at the 37th Annual Grammy Awards.

== Music video ==
The black and white music video for the song is known for its technical achievement in that it was shot in one long continuous single take with no edits, cuts, or digital enhancement. In an RES magazine interview, Michel Gondry described the video as "a big turn for me, because it was so challenging. Nobody really believed - even me - that we could pull that off when we made it after 17 takes, because it was really done all in-camera in one shot. There is no post-production at all. I think this one really gave me a lot of attention.'"

The video was nominated for Best Music Video, Short Form at the 37th Annual Grammy Awards. It also received an MTV Video Music Award nomination for Best Male Video at the 1995 MTV Video Music Awards and was ranked number 20 in Slant Magazine's 100 Greatest Music Videos.

== Charts ==
Chart (1994)	Peak position
Australia (ARIA)	15
Canada Top Singles (RPM)	21
Iceland (Íslenski Listinn Topp 40)	16
New Zealand (Recorded Music NZ)	29
Scottish Singles Sales (Official Charts)	29
UK Singles (Official Charts)	37
UK Dance (Official Charts)	25
US Billboard Hot 100	29
US Alternative Airplay (Billboard)	22
US Dance Singles Sales (Billboard)	35
US Hot Rap Songs (Billboard)	27
US Pop Airplay (Billboard)	29

== Cover versions ==
On the album A Century of Song (Polyholiday Records), the song was covered by the American band La Musique Populaire. It was performed in the form of a spoof in an episode of the PBS series Bill Nye the Science Guy in 1995, but renamed "Whether the Weather" as part of the episode's scientific lesson about climates.
