= C. Howard's Violet candies =

American confectionery manufacturer

C. Howard Company, Inc. (also called Choward's), based in Bellport, New York, is the maker of Choward's Fine Mints and Gum. The company's flagship product is its unique hard square tablet "mint" (candy) with a distinct violet aroma and taste. Choward's candies are also available in lemon (flavored with natural oil of lemon), spearmint (flavored with natural oil of spearmint), guava, and peppermint flavors.

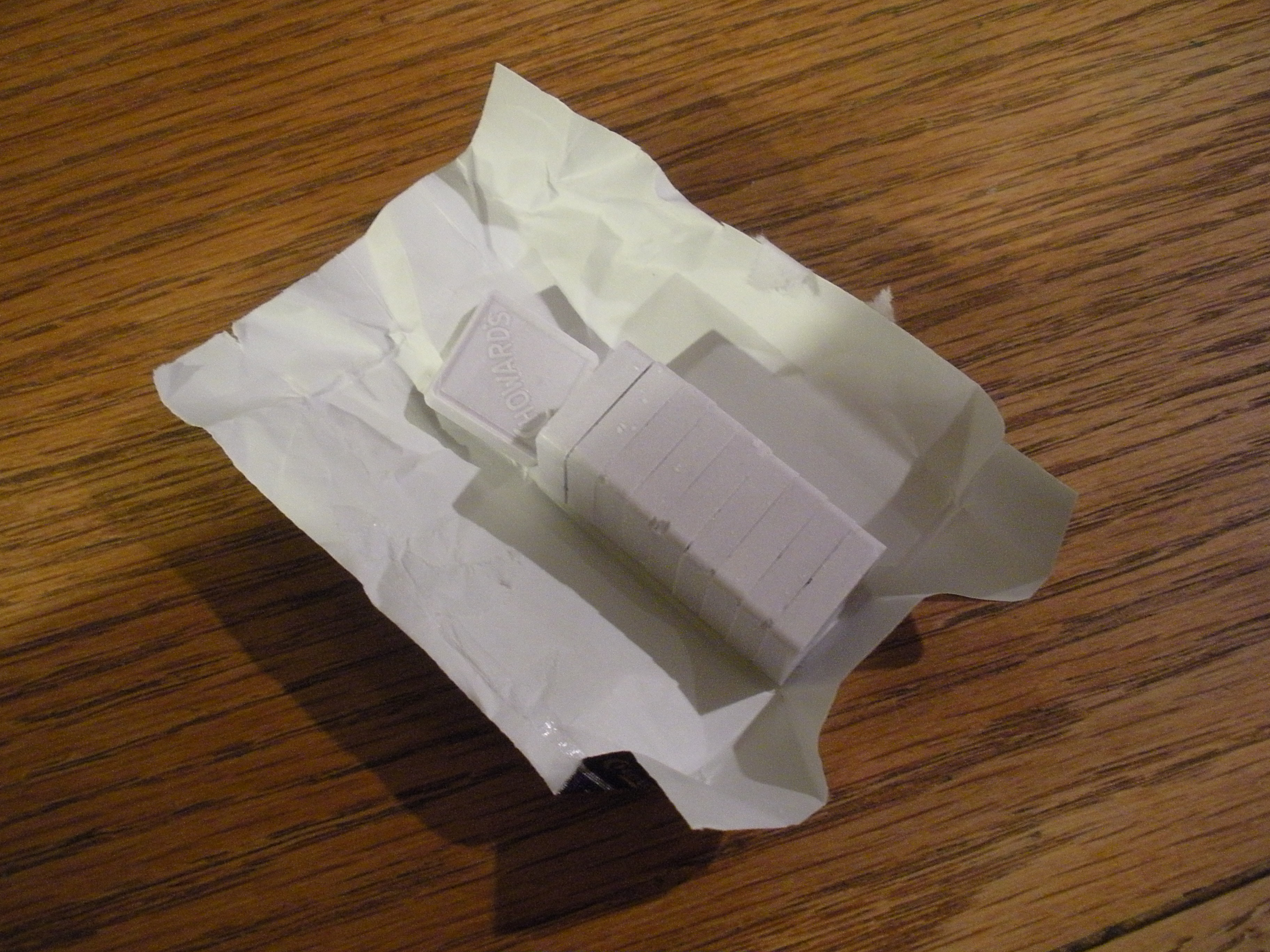
An opened package of Choward's Violet Mints

== History ==
The company was started by Charles Howard in New York City in 1934. In a small industrial loft on Broadway, Howard created the "Choward's Violet", a confectionery mint with a floral flavor. The next product was a purple colored gum tablet named "Choward's Scented Gum". The line was then expanded to include Choward's Peppermints, Spearmints, Lemon Mints, and Guava Candies.

== In popular culture ==
A recurring character in several Raymond Chandler novels also gets his nickname from the candy. Violets M'Gee is a homicide detective in the Los Angeles County Sheriff's Office, as mentioned in his 1943 novel The Lady in the Lake: "'Well, they call him Violets M'Gee,' I said. 'On account of he chews little throat pastilles that smell of violets.'"

It is also mentioned in Sarah Weeks' novel So B. It (2004), when Georgia gives one to Heidi. The indie pop band La Musique Populaire included their interpretation of the jingle "C. Howard's Gum Has the Power of Taste" on their CD set A Century of Song.

The candy is mentioned in two episodes of the AMC series Mad Men and displayed in others. In "Three Sundays", it was Archibald Whitman's favorite candy. In "Far Away Places", Peggy, who has an important presentation that day, anxiously searches in vain for her pack and explains to Abe that Donald Draper once gave it to her before a presentation. She dismisses Abe's suggestion to buy a replacement, because it "wouldn't be the same". When she finds it in her desk drawer at work, she tells her colleagues, "Oh. Thank God. I couldn't take one more omen of doom." In season six, we see that she continues to keep the candy in her desk drawer, even at CGC.

NCIS season 11 episode 5 also incorporates Choward's scented gum when DiNozzo finds some at a present crime scene, which causes him to remember a case he worked on when he was still with the Baltimore PD.
