= Lily of Laguna =

British coon song written by Leslie Stuart

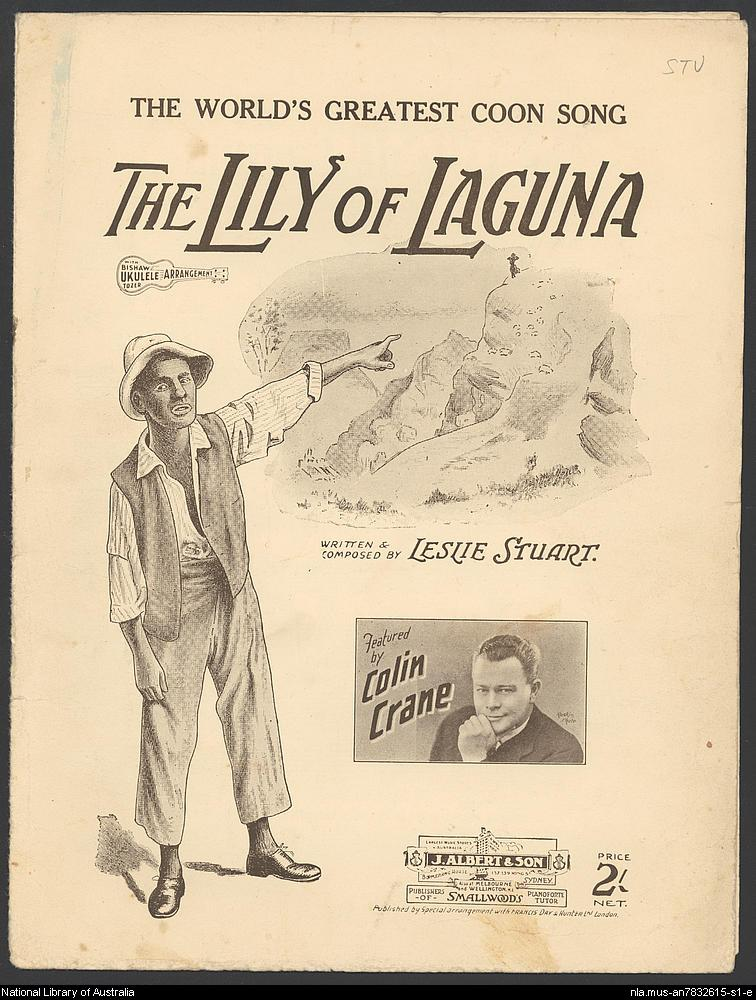
Sheet music cover

"Lily of Laguna" is a British coon song written in fake 'negro' dialect. It was written in 1896 by English composer Leslie Stuart. It was a music hall favourite, performed notably by blackface performers such as Eugene Stratton and G. H. Elliott. In the early 1940s Ted Fio Rito wrote the tune of a new verse and Paul Francis Webster wrote fresh lyrics and it was stripped of its overtly racist lyrics to become a pure love song which continued to be popular into the 1950s.

== History ==
The song was first performed in Oxford in July 1898, and first reviewed in the Entr'acte on 23 July 1898. Laguna of the original song was a village of Native American cave-dwellers somewhere "100 miles off the main line en route to California proceeding from New Orleans." Lily was a cave-dwelling Indian girl. The song stood aside from Stuart's other works, in part because Stuart wrote both the music and the verses. Stuart wrote that "I wrote the words and music together to a large degree and, consequently, I was able to get effects that the canons of art lay down as being impossible... Instead of ending where, say, the average poet would compel me by the metre of his verse I, writing my own lyrics, add two bars more and get an entirely new effect". The verse section contain a dramatic mood shift of iii minor, to ii minor, to I Major. The arrangement has an oboe obligato play the tune of Lily's call to her flock on her shepherdess's pipe.

The song was regularly played throughout the rest of Stuart's life, although not as frequently as less demanding compositions. On the night of Stuart's death, 26 March 1928, it was performed by Herman Darewski band at the Coliseum Theatre, with Queen Soraya of Afghanistan in attendance.

A reaction to overtly racist lyrics in coon song began to take place in the twentieth century and Bing Crosby and Mary Martin performed the less racially offensive version by Fio Rito and Webster of this song in 1942 which is primarily based on the chorus of the original song, i.e., "She's my lady love". The song was transformed in a number of ways: the racial imagery was replaced with lines referencing sailors, ships, docks, and lollipops; the entire verse sections which, in the original, contains the dramatic mood shift was updated to the jazzy big band sound that was popular at the time; and a woman (Mary Martin) now sang lyrics from the female perspective.

== Meaning ==
The original song lyrics tell the story of a lonely black American man who falls in love with a woman from the Laguna tribe of Pueblos of New Mexico. Every evening he waits to hear her call her sheep and cattle so that he can go to her unseen by her father. Laguna, is Spanish, cognate with "lagoon", meaning "lake", and derives from a now dry lake located on the tribe's ancestral lands. The real indigenous name of the tribe is Kawaik.

== Chorus ==
She's ma lady love, she is ma dove, ma baby love,

She's no gal for sittin' down to dream,

She's de only queen Laguna knows;

I know she likes me, I know she likes me

Bekase she says so; She is de Lily of Laguna,

she is ma Lily and ma Rose.

== Notable recordings ==
Ted Fio Rito recorded a less racially offensive version of the song with reworked lyrics for Decca Records on 10 February 1942 (catalog 4258A). The following month, on 13 March 1942, Bing Crosby and Mary Martin recorded their version with the new lyrics as well.

Stanley Holloway released this song as a 45 rpm single in 1960.

The song was covered by Alvin and the Chipmunks for their 1960 album Around the World with The Chipmunks.

== In popular culture ==
It is sung in full in a music hall setting by either G H Elliot or Tom Finglass in the 1934 film Those Were the Days .

A 1938 British film was entitled Lily of Laguna starring Nora Swinburne and the song in the film was sung by Dudley Rolph

The full song is performed by Tom Finglass in the 1940 film You Will Remember which tells the story of Leslie Stuart's life.

The song was ordered to be played over the air from the pre-American Forces Network facilities in London during World War Two at a precise time, say 1307 hours, 1:07 p.m. Possibly, the tune was a signal to the French underground or some other group in German-held territory.

The chorus only version is sung spontaneously by a group of British soldiers (led by Stanley Holloway) on the eve of action in the 1944 wartime drama 'The Way Ahead'.

Errol Flynn sings a chorus only version of "Lily of Laguna" in the 1954 British film "Lilacs in the Spring", released in the US as Let's Make Up.

In the 1960s the song was performed by a British blackface group on the BBC's The Black and White Minstrel Show. Later sensitivities eventually made this whole genre and the original lyrics of the song unacceptable for public broadcasting.

In the television series All Creatures Great and Small, the song is sung by farmer Harold Ingledew in the episode "Attendant Problems", and by the Darrowby bell ringers in the episode "Alarms and Excursions".

We Are The Navy Blues, the team song of the Australian Football League club Carlton, uses the tune of the chorus of "Lily of Laguna".

The song can be heard being sung in the background of Saturday Night and Sunday Morning.

"Lily of Laguna" is also referenced in The Smiths song "Girl Afraid" by the lyrics, "She doesn't even like me; And I know because she said so."

== Footnotes ==
Stuart, Leslie (1898). The Lily of Laguna . J Albert & Son, under license from Francis Day and Hunter – via Wikisource.
