= St Margaret's Church, Rottingdean =

Church in Brighton, England

St Margaret, Rottingdean
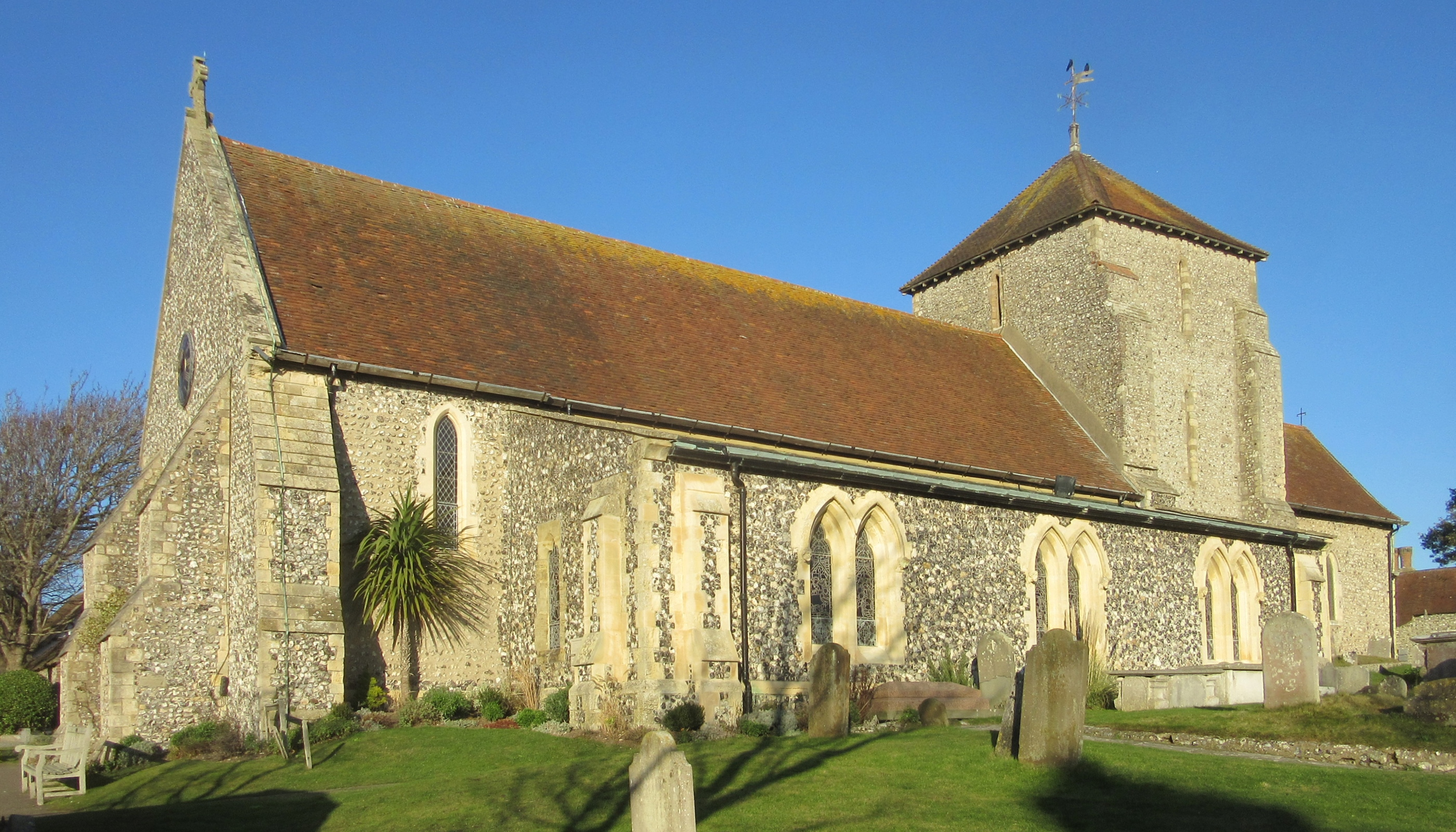
- The church from the southwest
- St Margaret, Rottingdean
- 50.8068°N 0.0575°W
- Denomination: Church of England
- Website: www.stmargaret.org.uk

History
- Dedication: Margaret of Antioch

Administration
- Province: Canterbury
- Diocese: Chichester
- Archdeaconry: Chichester
- Deanery: Rural Deanery of Brighton
- Parish: Rottingdean, St Margaret

Clergy
- Vicar: Vacancy (Interregnum) from 1st September 2025

St Margaret's Church is an Anglican church in the village of Rottingdean, in the city of Brighton and Hove, England. It is the parish church of Rottingdean, which became part of the former Borough of Brighton in 1928. Parts of the structure date from the 13th century, and it is a Grade II* listed building.

== History ==
The church is in the northeastern corner of the Green, the ancient heart of Rottingdean. A place of worship has stood in the position since the Saxon period, although there is disagreement over whether any part of the current structure is of Saxon origin. The Normans started building a cruciform church in the early 12th century, but its tower (located on the site of the Saxon building's chancel) collapsed during construction, destroying the new chancel and the transept, although the nave survived. By the early 13th century the chancel had been rebuilt and the nave extended by four bays. These were added to the south aisle, but this fell out of use after 1377 when the church and surrounding buildings were sacked by French invaders who had landed on the coast nearby. Damage to the west wall necessitated rebuilding at the same time, and the south aisle was blocked up.

The church remained structurally unaltered until a major restoration in 1856 by Sir George Gilbert Scott. A new three-bay south aisle was built; Scott removed an ancient window from the original aisle and built it into one of the new walls. The chancel wall was also partly rebuilt at this time. Earlier in the 19th century, box pews and a gallery were added; Scott removed the gallery during his restoration.

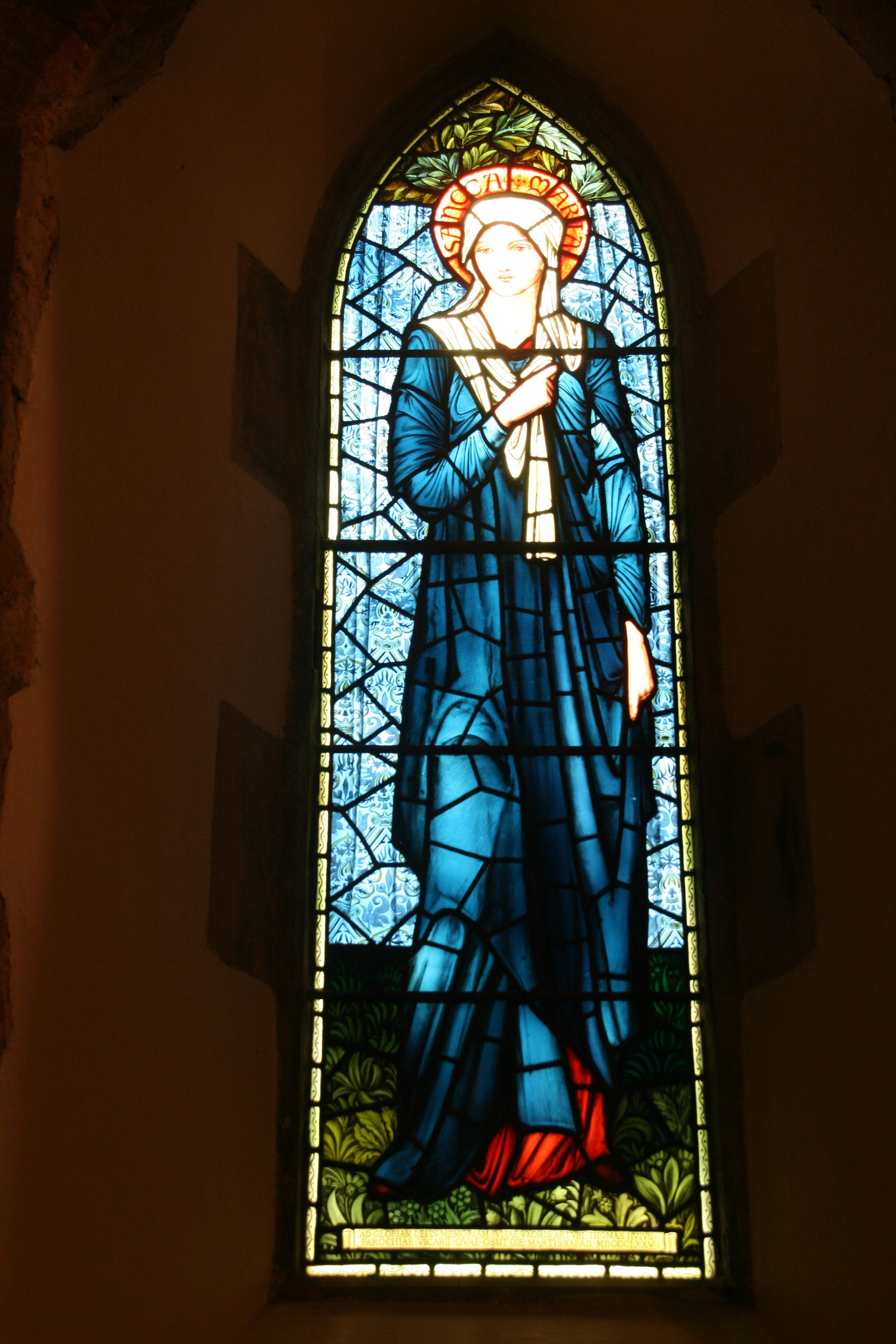
Window by Burne-Jones

Additions in the 20th century comprised a porch at the west entrance, erected in 1908, and vestries in one corner of the nave, added in the 1970s in a style appropriate to the mediaeval architectural style of the church. This was designed by the Brighton-based architecture firm Denman & Son. A new gallery, at the west end of the nave and accommodating the organ, was also built in 1908; the original gallery had been on the south side. The bowl of the original Norman font was discovered in the vicarage garden; a replica was made in 1910, and the original bowl was displayed in the church.

Lucy Ridsdale, daughter of Edward Ridsdale of The Dene, a house on the village green, married Stanley Baldwin in the church in 1892. He later served as Prime Minister of the United Kingdom on three occasions. The Baldwins donated a chair to the church in 1942; this stands in the chancel.

Sir Edward Burne-Jones, who designed many of the stained-glass windows in the church, lived at a house on the village green for 18 years until his death in 1898. He was the uncle of author and poet Rudyard Kipling, who moved to a nearby house (The Elms) in 1897. Kipling wrote many of the Just So Stories during his time there.

In the early 20th century, a proposal was received from the developers of the Forest Lawn Memorial Park, a private cemetery in Glendale, California. They wanted to buy the church, dismantle it stone by stone, ship it to the United States and rebuild it in the park. A price was offered, but the sale was refused, so in the 1940s a series of drawings were made, and an exact replica was built instead. This was called the Church of the Recessional to commemorate Kipling's poem "Recessional".

== Architecture ==
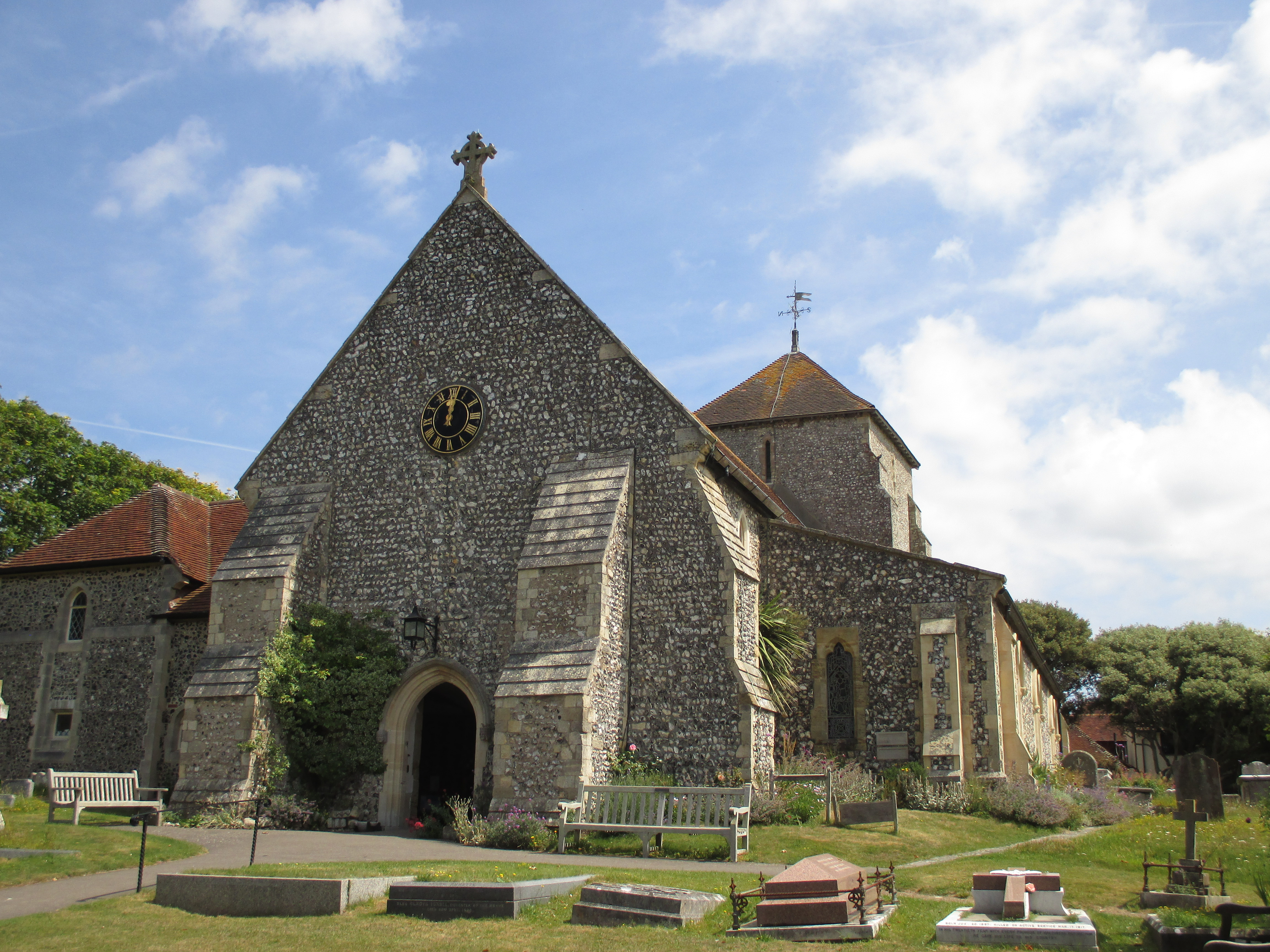
The west end and entrance

The church is built of flint, with stone dressings and a tiled roof. Although the 19th-century work by Scott also used flint, its pattern is more even than the random distribution seen in the original walls. The entrance is at the west end, opposite the village green, and reached through a lychgate dating from 1897 in memory of Revd Arthur Thomas, vicar of the church for 47 years until his death in 1895. (Two windows in the square tower are also memorials to him.) The entrance door is flanked by two heavy buttresses. On top of the steeply pitched roof at the west end is a small cross, and a large clock is embedded in the wall below this.

The main structures of the nave, chancel and tower are all original. There are a series of trefoil and lancet windows on all sides, many of which are paired. Many of these have stained glass; most were designed by Edward Burne-Jones. In particular, the east wall has three tall lancet windows and a quatrefoil; the lancet windows, installed in 1893 in commemoration of Burne-Jones's daughter Margaret's marriage, represent the archangels Gabriel, Michael and Raphael.

== The church today ==
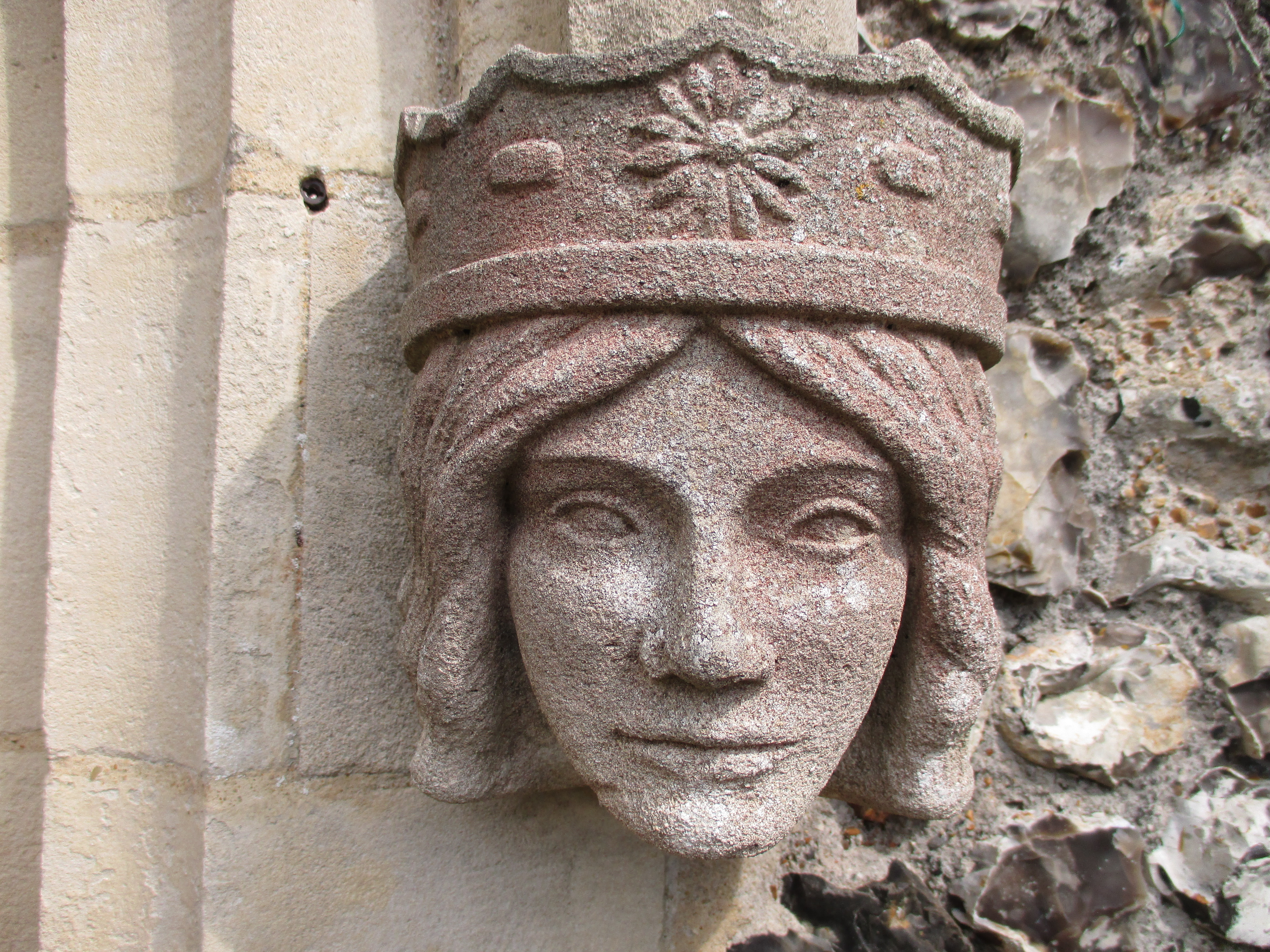
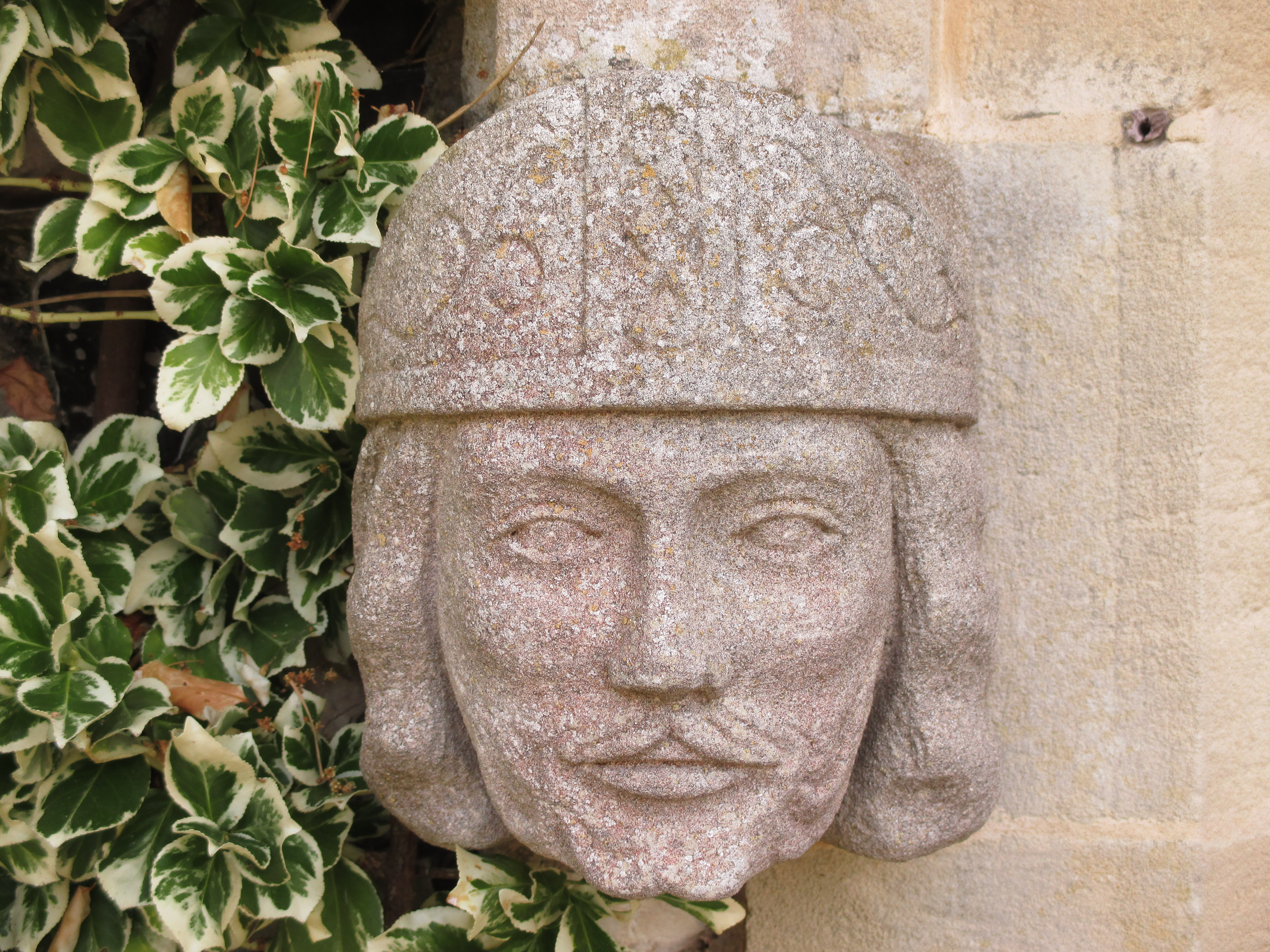
Head stops of St Margaret of Antioch and St Richard of Chichester in the west doorway

St Margaret's was listed at Grade II* on 13 October 1952. As of February 2001, it was one of 70 Grade II*-listed buildings and structures, and 1,218 listed buildings of all grades, in the city of Brighton and Hove. It remains in active use for worship, and is the only Anglican church in the Benefice of Rottingdean. The parish covers the whole of Rottingdean—reaching to the boundaries of Ovingdean and Saltdean—the coast road as far as Roedean, and surrounding areas of downland.

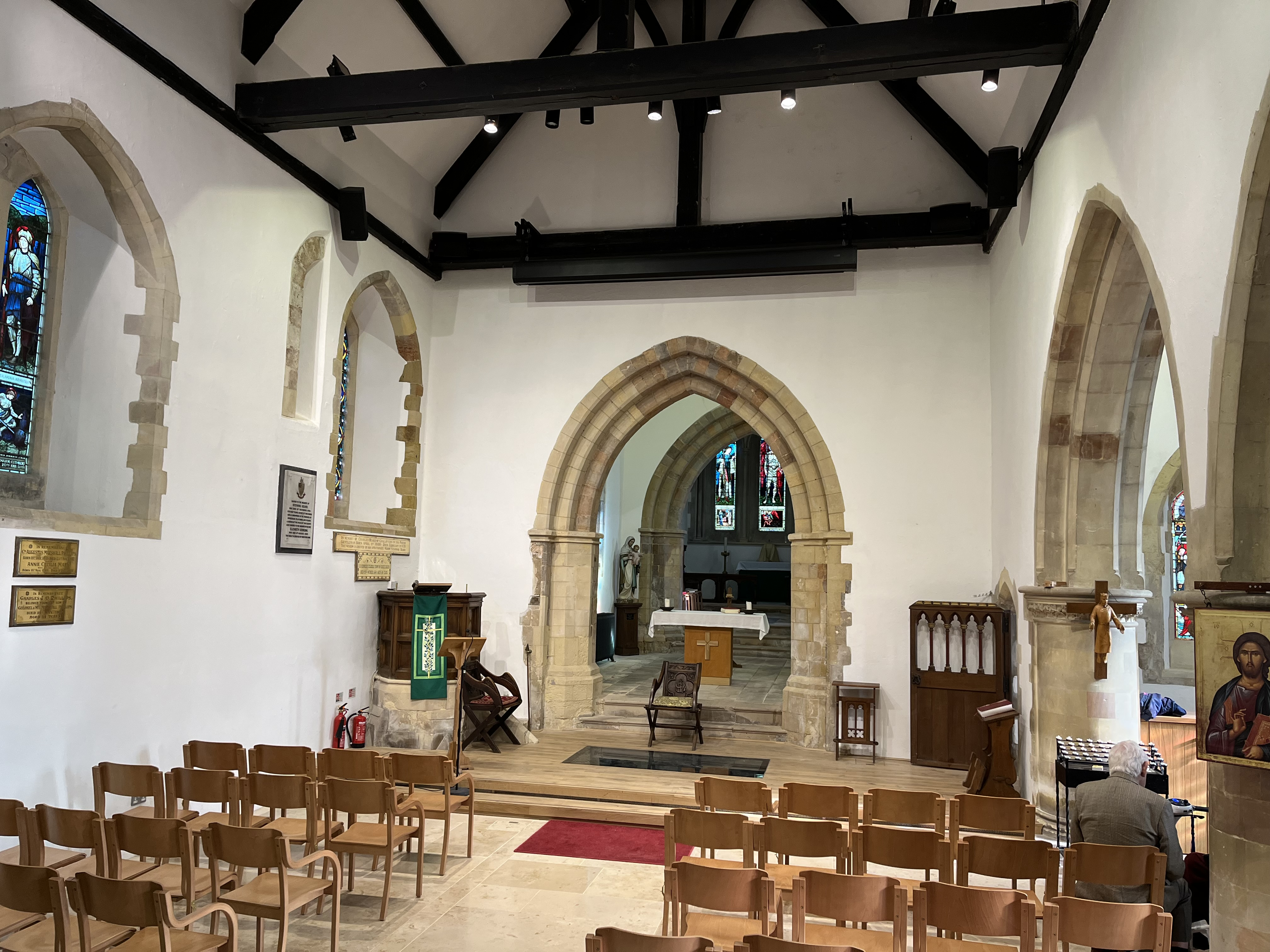
Interior of St Margaret's Rottingdean - November 2025

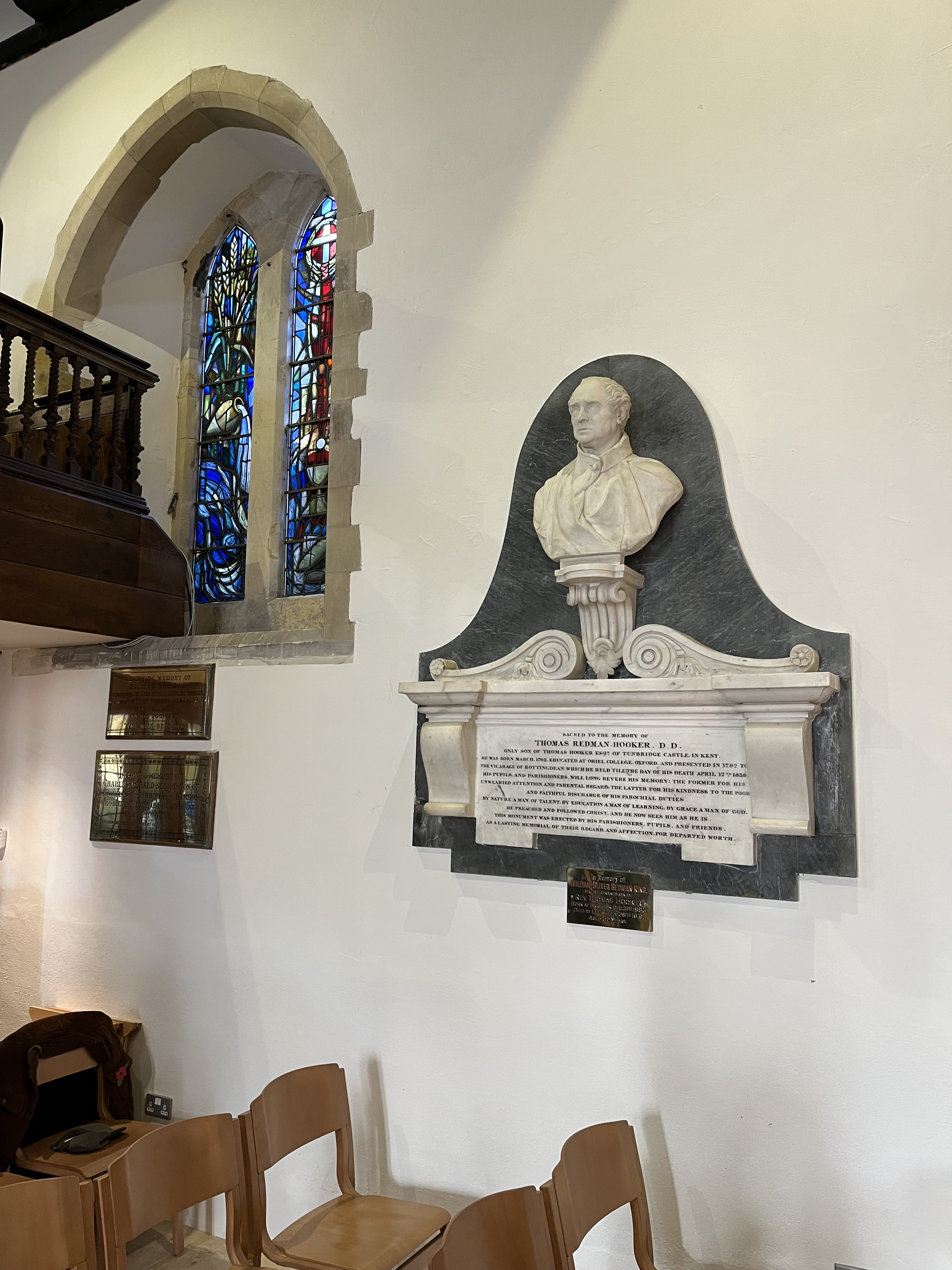
Bust of Rev Hooker in 2025

A development project in 2024-2025 removed the pews, installed underfloor heating, added shallower steps to the altar and moved the bust of Rev Dr Thomas Hooker from over the pulpit to a new position on the north wall of the church. Further phases of development are planned, including a two-story extension on the north side of the church to provide accessible toilets, a modern kitchen, buggy storage and shower facilities on the ground floor and a lift to first-floor meeting rooms and the gallery.

== Burials and memorials ==
The ashes of Sir Edward Burne-Jones, Pre-Raphaelite artist and designer, are buried in the churchyard. The ashes of his wife Georgiana, one of the MacDonald sisters, and their granddaughter, novelist Angela Thirkell, are also buried there. The ancient churchyard was extended in 1883, 1905 (with land donated by William Nevill, 1st Marquess of Abergavenny) and 1920. The churchyard includes the graves of Scottish novelist William Black, G. H. Elliott the Music Hall singer and the world renowned blues guitarist Gary Moore (died 2011). The gravestones of blackface music hall singers G. H. Elliott and Alice Bamford were removed for amendments to the wording in 2020 because a word used in the text had become unacceptably offensive with the passage of time. Elliott was referred to as the "Chocolate Coloured Coon" and Bamford as "Coon Singer and Dancer". The churchyard contains 14 Commonwealth war graves of nine British service personnel of World War I (including one unidentified merchant seaman) and four of World War II.

== See also ==
- Grade II* listed buildings in Brighton and Hove
- List of places of worship in Brighton and Hove
