= Lucacentric =

- Lucacentric by Lucas Secon

Studio album by Lucas
- Released: October 4, 1994
- Genres: Hip-hop, dance, pop
- Length: 55:24
- Label: Big Beat
- Producer: Lucas

Lucas chronology
To Rap My World Around You (1991)	Lucacentric (1994)

Professional ratings
Review scores
Source	Rating
AllMusic	3/5 stars
The Encyclopedia of Popular Music	3/5 stars
Entertainment Weekly	C

Lucacentric is a 1994 album by hip-hop musician Lucas.

The album peaked at #183 on the Billboard 200. The lead single, "Lucas with the Lid Off," reached the top 30 on four separate Billboard charts, including the Mainstream Top 40 and Hot 100 charts. Michel Gondry directed a Grammy Award-nominated music video for the single.

The album was released on Big Beat Records, the East Coast hip-hop and dance music record label owned by Warner Music Group and operated as a subsidiary of Atlantic Records. It was the follow-up to Lucas Secon's debut album, To Rap My World Around You.

== Production ==
Lucas wrote and produced the album. He used more than 60 samples on the track "Spin the Globe."

== Critical reception ==
The Baltimore Sun wrote: "Whether it's a matter of building a groove around a swing band sample and a ragga chant (as on 'Lucas with the Lid Off') or putting a jagged, asymmetrical rap over a smooth, jazzy rhythm bed (as on 'Wau Wau Wau'), the music Lucas makes is as distinctive as it is catchy." Entertainment Weekly wrote that "Lucas’ lyrics aren’t up to the speed of his delivery; unfortunately, neither is his hip-hop up to the ambition of what he’s trying to say." Trouser Press wrote that "the giddy wordplay ... is every bit as freeing as the rhymes proclaim themselves to be."

== Track listing ==
1. "The Statusphere, Pt. 1" – 1:29
2. "Lucas with the Lid Off" – 4:01
3. "City Zen" – 4:03
4. "Inflatable People" – 4:16
5. "Red White and Blues" – 3:33
6. "Wau Wau Wau" – 4:10
7. "Spin the Globe" – 4:34
8. "Born" – 5:26
9. "Work in Progress" – 5:02
10. "The Muted Trumpet" – 3:17
11. "Livin' in a Silicone Dream" - 3:52
12. "Pendulum Swings" - 4:36
13. "The Statusphere, Pt. 2" - 2:56
14. "In It for the Lifelong" - 4:09
