= Lucas Secon =

Danish/American musician (born 1970)

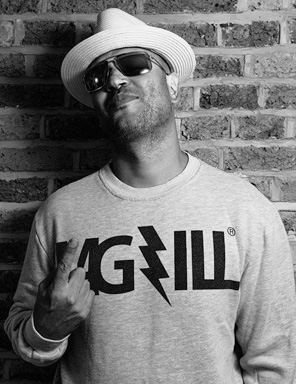
- Secon by Thomas Christensen, 2016
- Born: Lucas Secon; Copenhagen, Denmark
- Occupations: Musician; DJ; singer; songwriter; rapper; record producer; recording/mixing engineer; programmer
- Relatives: Paul Secon (father); Berta Moltke (mother)
- Musical career
- Genres: Electronic; soul; R&B; pop; hip-hop
- Instruments: Keyboards; vocals; turntables; synthesizer; drums
- Years active: 1990–present
- Labels: Big Beat; Uptown; WEA; Mercury; Polydor
- Website: (under construction)

Lucas Secon (born 3 November 1970), also known mononymously as Lucas, is a Danish record producer, songwriter, and rapper. He has written and produced for artists including the Pussycat Dolls, Alesso, Britney Spears, Christina Aguilera, Kylie Minogue, Toni Braxton and Mos Def. Secon has won a BMI Award and has been nominated for two Grammy Awards and an MTV Video Music Award.

== Early life ==
Secon is the son of Berta (née Moltke) and Paul Secon. His mother is a painter from Denmark and served as the former head of the Danish Academy of Arts; while his father, who was American and of Jewish descent, was a musician, songwriter, music critic, Billboard reporter, and businessman who co-founded the retailer Pottery Barn. Paul Secon's songs were performed by Nat King Cole, the Ink Spots, Rosemary Clooney, and the Mills Brothers, who recorded Secon's composition "You Never Miss the Water (Till the Well Runs Dry)".

== Career ==
=== 1990–1994: solo career ===
Signed to Uptown Records by Andre Harrell, Secon debuted in 1990 with the album To Rap My World Around You.

In 1993, he signed with Atlantic Records' East Coast hip-hop and dance music record label, Big Beat, and released his 1994 album, the jazz-influenced Lucacentric. It also spawned the single "Lucas with the Lid Off", which peaked at #29 on the U.S. Billboard Hot 100 and became his only Top 40 hit as a solo artist. The music video for the single, directed by Michel Gondry, received a Grammy Award for Best Music Video nomination at the 37th Annual Grammy Awards and a MTV Video Music Award nomination for Best Male Video in 1995.

=== Songwriting and producing career ===
Following the release of Lucacentric, Secon moved into music production and songwriting.

== Awards and nominations ==
Lucas Secon has been nominated for the Grammy and MTV Video Music Awards, and in 2010 won a BMI London Award in Pop Music for The Pussycat Dolls "I Hate This Part".

- Grammy nomination in Best Dance/Electronica album for "Wonderland" by Steve Aoki
- BMI airplay award for The Pussycat Dolls "I Hate This Part"

== Personal life ==
Secon's son, Fabian, is also a recording artist.

== Discography ==
=== Albums ===
- 1990: To Rap My World Around You
- 1994: Lucacentric

=== Singles and EPs ===
- 1991: "Show Me Your Moves" – Uptown/RCA
- 1994: "Wau Wau Wau" – Big Beat
- 1994: "Lucas with the Lid Off" – Big Beat
- 1994: "CityZen" – WEA
- 1996: "Comin' Out to Play" (featuring Junior Dangerous) – Mercury
- 2001: "My Feet Hurt" (featuring Blue) – Open-Door Records
- 2001: "My Feet Work" – Polydor
