= Steven Weiss =

Steven Weiss may refer to:

- Stephen H. Weiss (1935–2008), American investment banker, philanthropist
- Steven I. Weiss, Orthodox Jewish journalist and blogger
- Stephen Weiss (born 1983), Canadian ice hockey player
- Stephen E. Weiss, professor of policy and international business
- Steven J. Weiss, meteorologist

== See also ==
- Steve Weisberg (born 1963), American composer, recording artist, and producer
- Steve Weissman, American sportscaster
- Steven Weissman (born 1968), American alternative cartoonist
