= Soldiers of the Queen (song) =

British military song

Song
- Written: 1894–1895
- Published: 1898
- Genre: March
- Songwriter: Leslie Stuart

Soldiers of the Queen is a song written and composed by Leslie Stuart. The song is often sung and published as "Soldiers of the King" depending on the reigning monarch at the time. The tune was originally composed by Stuart as a march celebrating the opening of the Manchester Ship Canal in 1894. The lyrics were added at a later date and the title changed. The song was then interpolated in the musical comedy An Artist's Model (1895).

The song served as the regimental (quick) march of the Queen's Regiment from 1966 to 1992. It is also the regimental march of the Lord Strathcona's Horse (Royal Canadians), the second most senior of Canada's Cavalry Regiments.

It was used as the theme to the film, Breaker Morant.

== Lyrics ==
Soldiers of the Queen by Leslie Stuart 1898:

1
Britons once did loyally declaim
About the way we rul'd the waves
Ev'ry Briton's song was just the same,
When singing of our soldier braves.
All the world had heard it

wonder'd why we sang,

And some have learn'd the reason why
But we're forgetting it,
And we're letting it
Fade away and gradually die,
Fade away and gradually die.
So when we say that England's master,
Remember who has made her so

1st Refrain
It's the Soldiers of the Queen, my lads
Who've been my lads,
Who're seen my lads,
In the fight for England's glory, lads,
When we've had to show them what we mean:
And when we say we've always won,
And when they ask us how it's done,
We'll proudly point to ev'ry one

of England's soldiers of the Queen!

It's the Queen!

2
War clouds gather over ev'ry land,
Our flag is threaten'd east and west.
Nations that we've shaken by the hand
Our bold resources try to test
They thought they found us sleeping

thought us unprepar'd,

Because we have our party wars,
But Englishmen unite when they're call'd to fight
The battle for Old England's common cause,
The battle for Old England's common cause.
So when we say that England's master,
Remember who has made her so.

2nd/3rd Refrains

It's the Soldiers of the Queen, my lads,
Who've been my lads,
Who're seen my lads,
In the fight for England's glory, lads,
When we have to show them what we mean:
And when we say we've always won,
And when they ask us how it's done,
We'll proudly point to ev'ry one

Of England's soldiers of the Queen!

It's the Queen!

3
Now we're rous'd we've buckled on our swords,
We've done with diplomatic lingo,
We'll do deeds to follow on our words,
We'll show we're something more than "jingo."
And though Old England's laws do not her sons compel

To military duties do,

We'll play them at their game, and show them all the same,
An Englishman can be a soldier too,
An Englishman can be a soldier too.
So when we say that England's master,
Remember who has made her so.

Refrain
