= La Musique Populaire =

- Also known as: Lorenzo Music Philharmonic, LMP
- Origin: Champaign, Illinois, United States
- Genres: Art pop, chamber pop, progressive pop
- Years active: 1992––present
- Labels: Polyholiday
- Members: Ryan Bassler, Eric Haugen
- Website: http://www.polyholiday.com/artists/LMP

La Musique Populaire is an American indie pop band, made of up members Ryan Bassler and Eric Haugen. The band was originally a quartet, Lorenzo Music in 1992, which grew into a 22 member pop orchestra, called the Lorenzo Music Philharmonic. Faced with legal action from the actor of the same name, the name changed it to La Musique Populaire before the release of their debut EP, Auntie Canada in 1996.

As part of the American indie pop scene of the 1990s, they are defined by their eclectic sound, like contemporaries Ween and The Magnetic Fields. On their website, LMP lists as their influences: ABBA, The Archies, The Beatles, The Beach Boys, Christopher Cross, Hall and Oates, Rupert Holmes, Haysi Fantayzee, Billy Joel, Rodd Keith, Orchestral Manoeuvres in the Dark, Prefab Sprout, The Rock-afire Explosion, Squeeze, Paul Williams, Wham, and Steve Winwood. During this time, the band recorded tracks to various compilation releases and an EP, Omar Sheriff, which, as of 2020, remains unreleased.

By 2000, the band moved to Evanston, Illinois, where they started on several projects in a studio they called "Eckhouse 2000". Their main project was A Century of Song, a six-CD box set chronicling the 20th century through pop music. Other projects included two EPs, The New Body Language and Meeting Up and Making Friends and two albums, What'll We Do At the Zoo and Love Conquers Alda.

In 2001, LMP moved to Chicago, where they continued recording in a new studio space, Shiny Vibes. Most of the material eventually were released through Polyholiday Records, with the exception of What'll We Do At the Zoo.

Their most famous project, A Century of Song, was considered by LMP as their most ambitious project. As it was about the songs that defined the 20th century, the band covered that ranged from hits, like We Built This City by Starship, to the esoteric, like Aquarius by Boards of Canada. Some songs were covered straightforward, whereas others in different genres. The album received positive reviews, with Greg Adams of AllMusic stating that LMP covered the century "with irreverence, humor, and impressively accomplished and inventive arrangements." Douglas Wolk of the Seattle Weekly called it "pretty funny" remarking that "it sounds like everyone's having a great time. "

As of 2014, Bassler and Haugen continue to record material La Musique Populaire, but none of their material has been released publicly. Their most recent release, You Ain't Nuttin' If You Ain't Struttin, had art from Sandy Hoffman, who did the cover of The London Muddy Waters Sessions.

== Discography ==
=== Albums/EPs ===
All on Polyholiday Records.

- Aunt Canada - 1996
- The New Body Language - 2000
- Meeting Up and Making Friends - 2001
- Love Conquers Alda - 2003
- A Century of Song - 2004

=== Singles ===
- "Ding Dong" - 2003
- "Our Birthday" - 2004
- "Show Some Heaven to Me Baby" - 2004
- "Sugar Cone" - 2004
- "Honey Honey Honey Honey" - 2004

=== Tribute albums ===
LMP did a cover of "Mysterious Whisper" for the album We Might Be Giants, Too!, a tribute album to They Might Be Giants released in 1998, as well as Glass Flesh 2, a tribute album to Robyn Hitchcock.
