= Pack Up Your Troubles in Your Old Kit-Bag =

"Pack Up Your Troubles"

Song
- Published: 1915
- Genre: March
- Composer: Felix Powell
- Lyricist: George Henry Powell

Pack Up Your Troubles in Your Old Kit-Bag, and Smile, Smile, Smile (As sung by Helen Clark (1917)

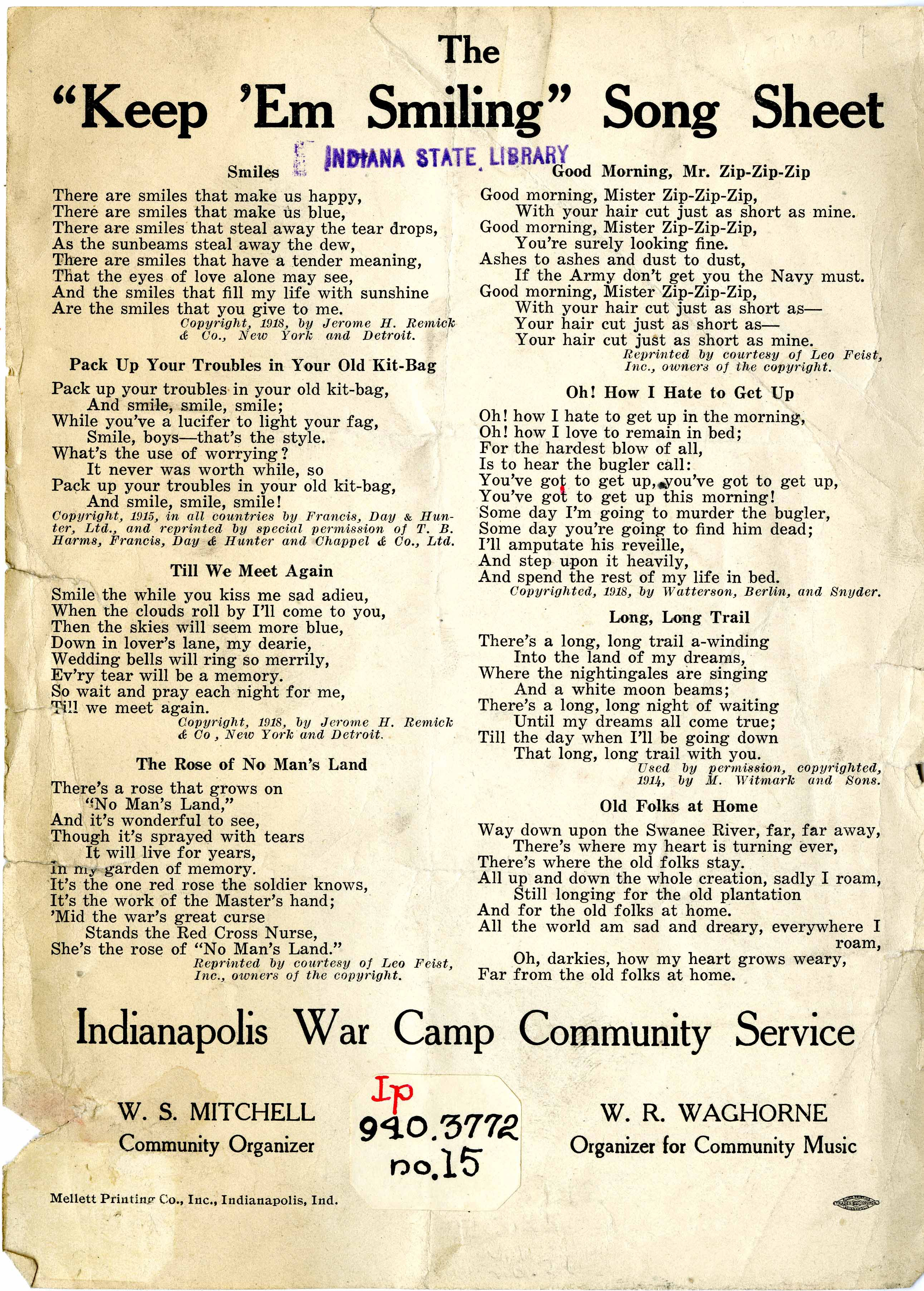
The "Keep 'Em Smiling" song sheet produced by the Indianapolis War Camp Community Service in 1917/18, including "Pack Up Your Troubles in Your Old Kit-Bag"

"Pack Up Your Troubles in Your Old Kit-Bag, and Smile, Smile, Smile" is the full name of a World War I marching song, published in 1915 in London. It was written by Welsh songwriter George Henry Powell under the pseudonym of "George Asaf", and set to music by his brother Felix Powell. The song is best remembered for its chorus.

It was featured in the American show Her Soldier Boy, which opened in December 1916.

Performers associated with this song include the Victor Military Band, James F. Harrison, Adele Rowland, Murray Johnson, Reinald Werrenrath, and the Knickerbocker Quartet.

A later play presented by the National Theatre recounts how these music hall stars rescued the song from their rejects pile and re-scored it to win a wartime competition for a marching song. It became very popular, boosting British morale despite the horrors of that war. It was one of a large number of music hall songs aimed at maintaining morale, recruiting for the forces, or defending Britain's war aims. Another of these songs, "It's a Long Way to Tipperary", was so similar in musical structure that the two were sometimes sung side by side.

== Other performances ==
Florrie Forde performed it throughout the United Kingdom in 1916.

Other performers associated with this song include Helen Clark, Reinald Werrenrath, and Oscar Seagle.

Cilla Black performed the song as a comedy/singing sketch on her variety television series Surprise Surprise.

The original version was interpolated in and inspired the song "Pack Up" by English musician Eliza Doolittle.

== In film ==
The song appears in several films, including:

- Varsity Show (1937) with Dick Powell.
- Pack Up Your Troubles (1932) with Laurel & Hardy, whose title actually came from the song.
- High Pressure (1932) - William Powell's character sings it to rally his investors.
- The Shopworn Angel (1938)
- Wife vs. Secretary (1936) - Around 36 minutes into the film, Clark Gable's character sings the first two lines of the chorus as he arrives home to greet Myrna Loy.

== Literary references ==
- The title of Wilfred Owen's anti-war poem "Smile, Smile, Smile" (September 1918) was derived from the song.
