= George Henry Powell =

Welsh songwriter

- Also known as: George Asaf
- Born: 27 April 1880; High St., St Asaph, Wales
- Died: 3 December 1951 (aged 71) Hove, East Sussex, England
- Occupation: Songwriter

George Henry Powell (27 April 1880 – 3 December 1951) was a Welsh songwriter who, under the pseudonym George Asaf, wrote the lyrics of the marching song "Pack Up Your Troubles in Your Old Kit-Bag" in 1915. The music was written by his brother Felix Powell, and the song was entered into a World War I competition for "best morale-building song". It won first prize and was noted as "perhaps the most optimistic song ever written". Although Felix Powell was a Staff Sergeant in the British Army, George Powell was a pacifist, and became a conscientious objector when conscription was imposed in 1916.
