= Felix Powell =

Welsh composer

- Born: Felix Lloyd Powell; 23 May 1878; St Asaph, Wales
- Died: 10 February 1942 (aged 63) Peacehaven, East Sussex, England
- Occupation: Composer

Felix Lloyd Powell (23 May 1878 – 10 February 1942) was a Welsh British Army Staff Sergeant most famous for writing the music for marching song "Pack Up Your Troubles in Your Old Kit Bag and Smile, Smile, Smile", in 1915, during World War I. The words were written by his brother George Henry Powell (under the pseudonym George Asaf), and the song was entered into a competition for "best morale-building song". It won first prize and was noted as "perhaps the most optimistic song ever written".

Powell later wrote a musical play, Rubicund Castle, which was staged at the Pavilion Theatre in Peacehaven. When a West End producer bought it he drastically altered it, leaving only the music unchanged, and renamed it Primrose Times. This version went unstaged after the latter was arrested and convicted for fraud.

Powell committed suicide during World War II in 1942, aged 63. Wearing the uniform of the Peacehaven Home Guard, he shot himself in the heart while on guard duty, using his own rifle.
