= Leslie Stuart =

English composer (1863–1928)

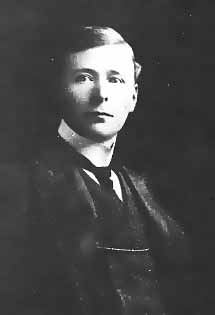
Leslie Stuart

Leslie Stuart (15 March 1863 – 27 March 1928) born Thomas Augustine Barrett was an English composer of Edwardian musical comedy, best known for the hit show Florodora (1899) and many popular songs.

He began in Manchester as a church organist, for 14 years, and taught music while beginning to compose church music and secular songs in the late 1870s. In the 1880s, he began to promote and conduct orchestral and vocal concerts of popular and theatre music as "Mr. T. A. Barrett's Concerts". He began to focus his composition on music hall, including songs for blackface performers, such as "Lily of Laguna"; songs for musical theatre, such as pantomimes and London shows touring through Manchester; and ballads such as "Soldiers of the King". Stuart later campaigned against the interpolation of new songs into musical theatre scores and for better enforcement of musical copyrights.

In 1895, Stuart began to write songs for George Edwardes's London shows at the Gaiety Theatre and Daly's Theatre. His first full musical comedy score was Florodora in 1899. The show became an international hit, and its song "Tell me, pretty maiden", became a vaudeville standard. Other musical comedy successes followed, including The School Girl (1903), The Belle of Mayfair (1906) and Havana (1908). Of his later shows, only Peggy made much of an impact. By 1911, Stuart's gambling debts sent him into bankruptcy. Unable to adapt to changing musical tastes, he was no longer in demand as a composer, although he had some success as a piano sketch artist in variety theatre.

== Life and career ==
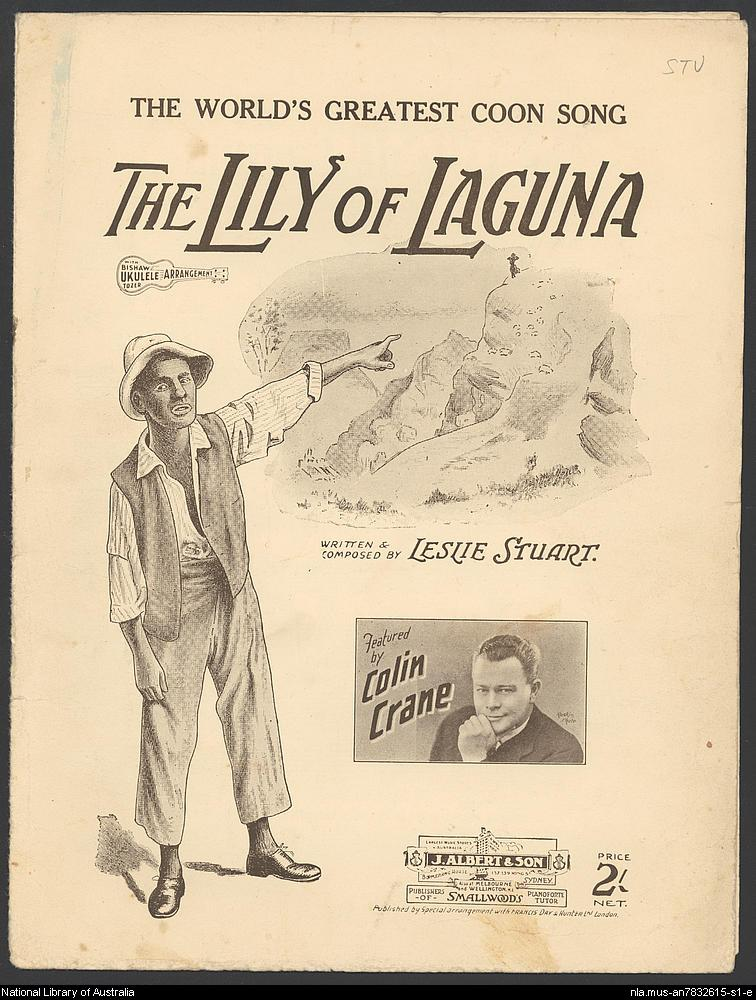
Sheet music for "Lily of Laguna", 1898

=== Early years ===
According to his entry in the Oxford Dictionary of National Biography, Stuart was born in Southport, on the Lancashire coast on 15 March 1863. He was the younger son of Thomas Barrett, a cabinet-maker, and his wife, Mary Ann Burke, née Lester, who were both from western Ireland. He grew up in Liverpool, where he attended St Francis Xavier's College. His family moved to Manchester in 1873.

He began his career aged 15 as organist at Salford Cathedral. He held the post for seven years, and then moved to be organist at the Church of the Holy Name, Manchester, where he remained for another seven years. To augment his salary he composed church music and taught.

Stuart also promoted and conducted orchestral and vocal concerts. In the 1880s and 1890s he presented "Mr T. A. Barrett's Concerts" at the Free Trade Hall, Manchester, and later at the larger St James's Hall. These concerts featured popular orchestral music and selections from comic operas by such composers as Sullivan and Cellier, and excerpts from English grand operas by Balfe and Wallace. Singers included Zélie de Lussan, Marie Roze, Ben Davies, David Ffrangcon-Davies, Durward Lely and Charles Manners. Instrumental soloists included Ignacy Jan Paderewski and Eugène Ysaÿe.

Thomas Barrett had been property master at the Amphitheatre, Liverpool, and both his sons had quickly gained a taste for the theatre. Stuart's elder brother, Stephen (1855–1924), became a music-hall performer, appearing under the stage name Lester Barrett. Gradually the music Stuart composed for local shows, and his popular ballads and music-hall songs began to supersede the composition of serious and religious music. He composed music hall songs as "T. A. Barrett" and under the pseudonyms "Leslie Thomas", "Lester Barrett" and, most notably, "Leslie Stuart". He wrote many popular songs for the blackface performer Eugene Stratton, including perhaps his best-remembered music hall song, "Lily of Laguna" (1898), and "Little Dolly Daydream". He also wrote the patriotic ballad "Soldiers of the King" (1894, now sung as "Soldiers of the Queen"). In 1886, Stuart married Mary Catherine Fox, a schoolteacher (died 1941).

Sheet music for Florodora, 1899

Stuart's earliest theatrical composing and writing was also for the Manchester theatre. Here he provided songs and incidental music for, in particular, the local pantomimes, which boasted famous names in their casts. Stuart made a name in the 1890s by writing popular individual numbers that were interpolated into several West End and touring musicals by other composers. Later in his career, he would actively oppose this practice. The first of these songs was "Lousiana Lou". [sic] This had already been published and performed in music hall before being picked up by Ellaline Terriss and inserted, along with "The Little Mademoiselle", into the original production of The Shop Girl (1894), at the Gaiety Theatre.

During the run of George Edwardes's An Artist's Model (1895), Stuart wrote several numbers that were interpolated (including "The Soldiers of the Queen", which was later famous as "Soldiers of the King"), and both wrote the lyric and composed "Trilby Will Be True" for Maurice Farkoa to perform at Daly's Theatre. Subsequently he had songs used in Baron Golosh, The Circus Girl (1896), the London production of the American musical A Day in Paris (1897), Carl Kiefert's The Ballet Girl (1897) and The Yashmak (1897).

Stuart composed some 65 songs including, in addition to those mentioned above, "The Bandolero", and "Little Dolly Daydream". His instrumental pieces included at least one Cakewalk. As a songwriter, Stuart suffered so much from the effects of copyright infringement that it can be speculated that his move to the musical theatre was an attempt to avoid the loss of royalty income from the publication of sheet music and performances.

=== Peak years ===
Music from Florodora (1899)
"Tell me pretty maiden"
Edison Records, c. 1908: "Edison Sextette": Ada Jones, George S. Lenox, Corinne Morgan, Grace Nelson, Bob Roberts and Frank C. Stanley

"In the shade of the palm"
Edison Records, 1902: Frank C. Stanley

Stuart's greatest acclaim came in 1899 with Florodora, his first full musical comedy score, with a book by Owen Hall. With traditional slow love ballads as well as waltzes and more rhythmic and playful concerted numbers, the score and show became a worldwide hit. The double sextet from that show, "Tell me, pretty maiden", became a vaudeville standard. The music critic Neville Cardus wrote about the "beautiful and unexpected phrasing and transitions" in the number, continuing, "it begins with a long phrase, rather like the opening bars of a Brahms symphony. It is extraordinary to find music such as this in a musical comedy". He ended by writing that in its own way it was "just as perfect a composition … as is the quintet in Meistersinger".

Florodora was followed by The Silver Slipper (1901), The School Girl (1903), The Belle of Mayfair (1906), and Havana (1908). All these shows were successful and were produced internationally.

Stuart was an active campaigner for intellectual property rights and called for tighter laws on both national and international copyright. Publishers and wealthy second-rate songwriters would pay producers, for the exposure, to insert their songs into a hit musical. With the strength of the fame of Florodora behind him, Stuart succeeded in stopping this practice in his next few pieces. Similarly, he had succeeded from time to time in parts of his fight in Britain and in America against unauthorized music distribution and on behalf of firmer national and international copyright laws.

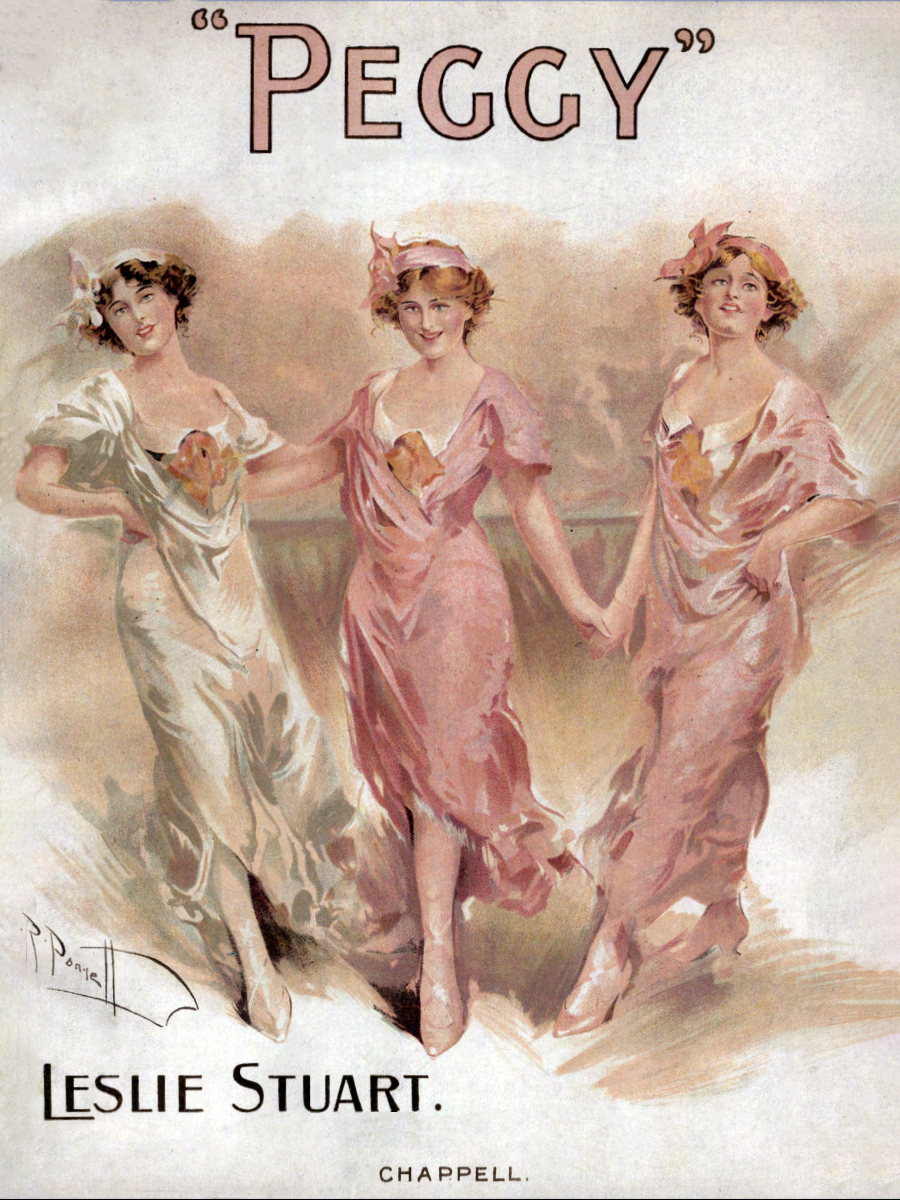
Music cover showing Olive May, Phyllis Dare and Gabrielle Ray in Peggy, 1911

The success of Stuart's shows led George Edwardes to hope that he would be able to replace the Caryll and Monckton writing partnership on their departure from the Gaiety Theatre. Stuart's next show, Captain Kidd (1909), however, was not for the Gaiety, and it was a flop. The Observer praised the performances of Terriss, Seymour Hicks and Ivy St Helier, but said that Stuart's music "had one striking and ingenious melody ... and two or three pretty tunes, and was adequate throughout without being remarkable." His next production, The Slim Princess (1910), made only a modest impact, though it was produced in New York as well as in London. Peggy was produced at the Gaiety in 1911 and had a reasonable but not outstanding run, from March to November in London, as well as a Broadway run. In the words of Stuart's biographer Andrew Lamb, these pieces "failed to add to his reputation".

=== Later years ===
By 1911, the lack of any new stage successes, coupled with gambling debts and the interest due on them, resulted in Stuart's appearance before the bankruptcy courts. He was declared bankrupt in 1913 and not discharged until 1920. At the age of 48 he found that changing tastes in musical styles and the influence of modern dance rhythms meant his career as a composer was effectively over, although he did write a number of songs that were inserted, against his principles, in the shows of other composers and a musical, Bubbles (1914), that was produced only in the provinces on a small scale.

Stuart retained an income, provided by continued revivals and performances of the popular Florodora, and supplemented this by appearing with success in variety theatre, where he performed his most famous songs accompanying himself on the piano. However, after the bankruptcy, he began to drink and have marital problems. Stuart's last years were spent partly in trying to achieve production of his musical play Nina, also known as The Girl from Nyusa. The Shubert brothers took out an option to produce the work, but nothing materialised. In 1927, shortly before his death, Stuart wrote a series of fourteen short pieces for the Empire News, consisting of recollections and reminiscences. They were collected and republished in 2003 under the title My Bohemian Life. Stuart and his wife, Kitty, had five children who survived to adulthood, Mary "May" (1886–1956), Thomas "Leslie" (1888–1970), Marie "Dollie" (1891–1949), Stephen "Chap" (b. 1894) and Constance "Lola" (b. 1896).

Stuart died at his daughter May's home in Richmond Hill, London in 1928, at the age of 65, and was buried in Richmond Cemetery following a requiem mass at St Elizabeth of Portugal Church.

== Reputation and legacy ==
The mid-20th century critic James Agate said that he had proved the quality of Stuart's music: he took a Stuart song, halved the tempo, supplied German words – and serious musicians accepted without demur his assertion that it was a recently discovered cradle song by Brahms. In 2003 the critic Rodney Milnes called Stuart "the most gifted composer of musical comedy in Britain between Sullivan and Vivian Ellis".

A 1941 biographical film entitled You Will Remember about Stuart starred Robert Morley as Stuart. It features several of Stuart's songs. Stuart's songs have been used in over a dozen other films. A bronzed plaster plaque of Stuart, made by John Cassidy, was placed in the Manchester Central Library in April 1939, inscribed "A son of Manchester who moved the nation to song".

== Notes ==
=== References ===
- Lamb, Andrew (2002). Leslie Stuart: Composer of Florodora. London: Routledge. ISBN 0415937477.
- Traubner, Richard (2003). Operetta: A Theatrical History. New York: Routledge. ISBN 0415966418.
- Stuart, Leslie (2003). Andrew Lamb (ed.). My Bohemian Life. Croydon: Fullers Wood Press. ISBN 0952414937.
