= Eugene Stratton =

American-born singer and dancer

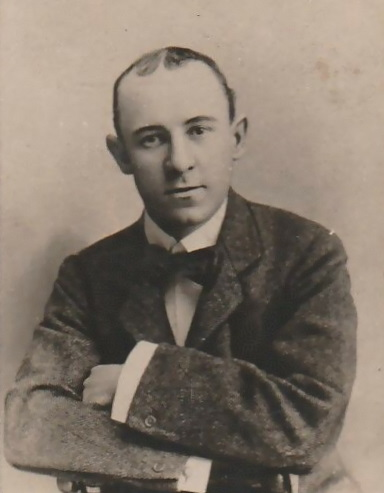
- c.1901
- Born: Eugene Augustus Rühlmann; May 8, 1861; Buffalo, New York, U.S.
- Died: September 15, 1918 (aged 57); Christchurch, Hampshire, England
- Other name: Master Jean
- Occupations: Music hall dancer, singer
- Spouse: Annie Matilda Moore

Eugene Augustus Rühlmann (May 8, 1861 – September 15, 1918) was an American-born dancer and singer. He adopted the stage name Eugene Stratton and spent most of his career in British music halls.

== Biography ==
Stratton was born in Buffalo, New York, to immigrants from Alsace. He first performed at the age of 10 in an acrobatic act called the "Two Wesleys", in which he was paired with a much larger man and was billed as 'The Big and Little of It'. He appeared as a dancer in 1873 under the name of Master Jean. He spent some time in a circus before joining a blackface minstrel show. In 1876 he toured in North America as one of "The Four Arnolds", which merged into Haverly's United Mastodon Minstrels in 1878. They went to England in 1880, by which time he had adopted the name of Stratton. When Haverly's troupe returned to the U.S. in 1881, Stratton stayed in England.

He joined the Moore and Burgess Minstrel Show, and quickly worked his way up to be the main song and dance man in the group, devising their routines. In 1883 he married Moore's daughter, Annie Matilda Moore. He was "a natural dancer with a wonderful sense of movement", and developed a talent for whistling. He left the minstrels to go on the music hall circuit in 1887, first as a double act, then solo. Although at one time he used an Irish voice, he mainly appeared as a "black-faced" singer.

His first song success was "The Whistling Coon", and then, more successfully, "The Dandy Coloured Coon", written by Morton and Le Brunn, the title of which Stratton then sometimes used as his bill matter. His friendship and association with Leslie Stuart gave him many of the songs for which he became best-known, including "Little Dolly Day Dream" and "Lily of Laguna". According to writer Roy Busby, Stratton "had neither a powerful nor an especially good voice, but he projected his songs by sheer artistry and natural acting ability... Seemingly oblivious of the audience, he sang softly at first, and slowly rising in pitch and volume, declared that Lily of Laguna was his lady love...". In another of his successful songs, "I Must Be Crazy but I Love You", "he would drift into a soft-shoe dance, full of delicate grace and accompanying himself with his powerful whistle...". Seymour Hicks described Stratton's dancing as "beautiful beyond words..".

During the period 1899 to 1911, Stratton made records of most of Stuart's songs. Stratton also performed in pantomime, beginning in 1896. Stratton was a member of the Grand Order of Water Rats. and was elected King Rat in 1896 and 1900.

He gave his final performance in 1914, and died in Christchurch, Hampshire on September 15, 1918. He is buried in Bandon Hill Cemetery in Wallington in Surrey. In 1935, his friend Joe Elvin was buried next to him.

In James Joyce's novel Ulysses (1922), the fifteenth episode, "Circe", has references to Stratton, as well as the adoption of a faux Negro dialect.

== Songs ==
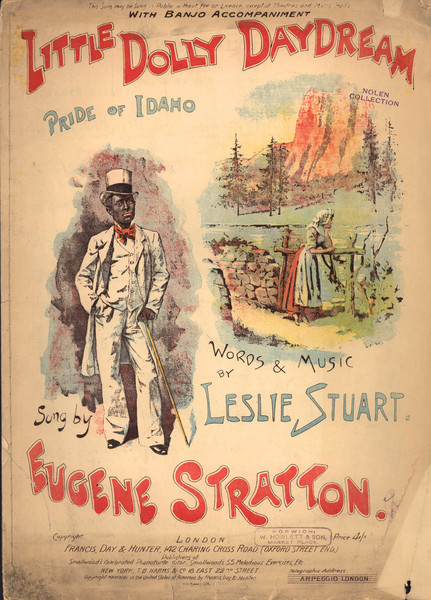
Stratton depicted by lithographer H. G. Banks on the cover of the sheet music for the song "Little Dolly Daydream" (1897), composed by Stratton's friend Leslie Stuart

- Aunt Mandy
- The Cake Walk
- A Carol of Stars
- The Dandy Coloured Coon
- Hoodoo
- Idler
- Is yer mammie always with ye?
- I don't know nobody
- I Lub a Lubly Gal
- I'm the father of a little black coon
- Lily of Laguna (There is a poster and a recording of him singing this, with a remarkable Irish accent)
- Little Dolly Daydream
- Love me little
- My little octoroon
- My second time on earth
- She's mine, I'm hers
- Waitress' love letter
- When de golden sun went down
- Whistling Coon
- Won't you love me
