= Eric Berry (actor) =

English actor (1913–1993)

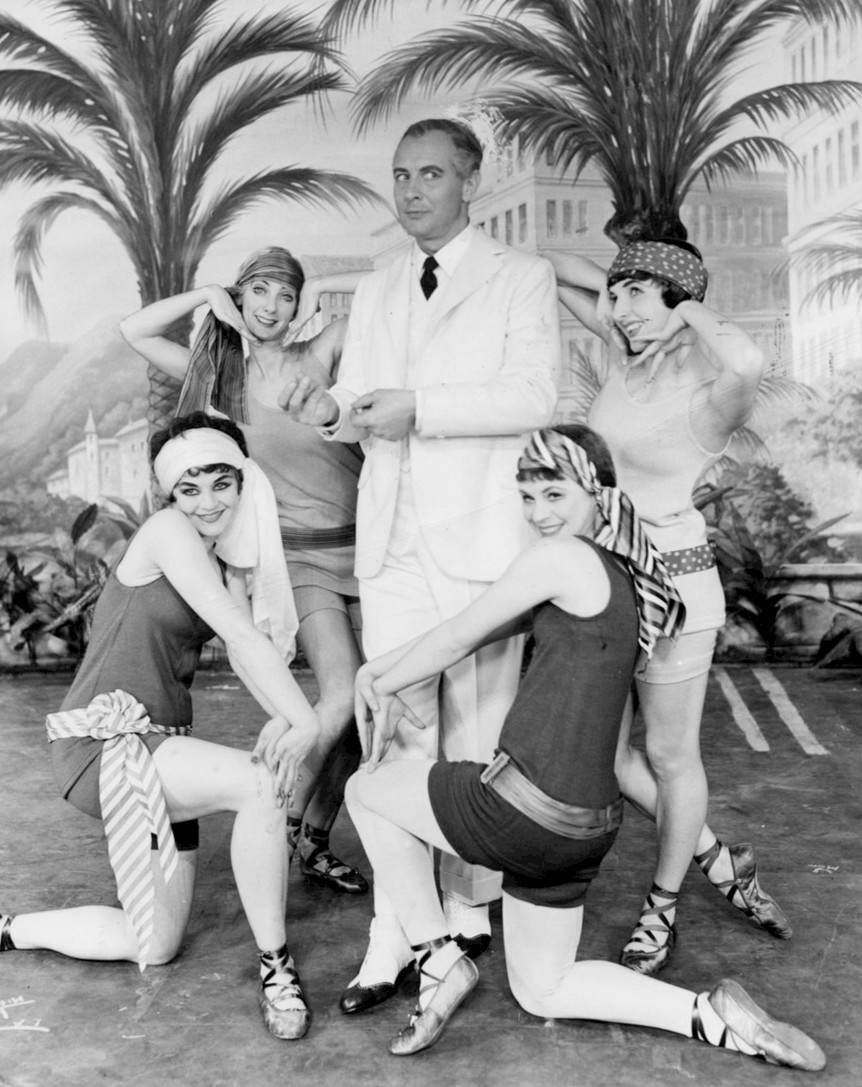
- From the original Broadway production of The Boy Friend, clockwise from left: Stella Claire, Lyn Connorty, Eric Berry, Dilys Laye, and Millicent Martin (1955)
- Born: 9 January 1913; London, England
- Died: 2 September 1993 (aged 80); Laguna Beach, California, United States
- Education: City of London School; Royal Academy of Dramatic Art
- Occupation: Actor
- Years active: 1937–1983

Eric Berry (9 January 1913 – 2 September 1993) was a British stage and film actor.

== Biography ==
Eric Berry was born in London on 9 January 1913 to parents Frederick William Berry and Anna Louisa Danielson. He attended the City of London School and trained for the stage at the Royal Academy of Dramatic Art. Berry was briefly married to actress Constance Carpenter. He died of cancer on 2 September 1993 in Laguna Beach, California.

== Career ==
Eric Berry made his first stage appearance in April 1931 in a production of Spilt Milk at what was then known as the Everyman Theatre, Hampstead. He made his West End theatre debut the following year in a production of The Cathedral at what is now the Noël Coward Theatre, then referred to as the New Theatre. Berry first appeared on Broadway in September 1954 as Percival Browne in a production of The Boy Friend at the Royale Theatre, a production which set a record for the longest-running Broadway production of a British musical. In 1972, Pippin opened at the Imperial Theatre starring Eric Berry as Charles, a part he would perform for the show's six-year Broadway run. Berry performed in a number of other productions on Broadway, including The Two Gentlemen of Verona in 1958, The Great God Brown in 1959, and Gideon in 1961.

From 1937 through 1983, Eric Berry also appeared in films and on television. Films in which Berry appeared include The Red Shoes in 1948, Miss Robin Hood in 1952, Escape by Night in 1953 and the 1961 adaptation of The Light that Failed. Teleplays in which Berry appeared include Sunday Night Theatre in 1950 and 1951, Play of the Week in 1960, and Bob Hope Presents the Chrysler Theatre in 1963. He appeared in an episode of The Asphalt Jungle in 1961.

== Filmography ==
=== Film ===
Year	Title	Role	Notes
1937	The Edge of the World	Robbie Manson	
1938	Richard of Bordeaux	Robert de Vere	TV film
1940	Contraband	Mr. Abo	
1941	49th Parallel	Nazi Radio Announcer	Uncredited
1946	Exercise Bowler	Bill Laver	TV film
1948	The Red Shoes	Dimitri	
1949	The Passionate Pilgrim	Dr. William Howard Russell	TV film
1949	Dear Mr. Prohack	Tailor's Assistant	Uncredited
1949	Edgar Allan Poe Centenary	Narrator	TV film
1952	Miss Robin Hood	Lord Otterbourne	
1953	The Story of Gilbert and Sullivan	Rutland Barrington	
1953	The Intruder	First Detective	
1953	Operation Diplomat	Colonel Williams	
1953	Escape by Night	Con Blair	
1954	Double Exposure	Mike Gerraty	
1954	The Diamond	Hunziger	
1955	The Constant Husband	Counsel for the Prosecution	
1961	The Light That Failed	Torpenhow	TV film
1963	Invincible Mr. Disraeli	Sir Robert Peel	TV film
1966	Lamp At Midnight	Father Riccardi	TV film
1966	Barefoot in Athens	Meletos	TV film
1973	Blade	The Bishop	

=== Television ===
Year	Title	Role	Notes
1950	BBC Sunday Night Theatre	Alan Conway	Episode: "Time and the Conways"
1951	BBC Sunday Night Theatre	M. Aemilius Lepidus	Episode: "Julius Caesar"
1952	BBC Sunday Night Theatre	Charles II	Episode: "The Portugal Lady"
1952	The Inch Man	Godfrey Lloyd	Episode: "Cloak and Dagger"
1952	Kraft Television Theatre		Episode: "A Christmas Carol"
1953	BBC Sunday Night Theatre	Arnholm	Episode: "The Lady from the Sea"
1957	The Kaiser Aluminium Hour		Episode: "Passion for Revenge"
1958	Adventures of the Sea Hawk	Drayson	1 episode
1959	The Play of the Week	Aegeus	Episode: "Medea"
1959	DuPont Show of the Month		Episode: "Billy Budd"
1960	DuPont Show of the Month	Sergeant Bibot	Episode: "The Scarlet Pimpernel"
1960	The United States Steel Hour	Constable Sutpen	Episode: "The Case of the Missing Wife"
1960	The Play of the Week	Sir John Falstaff	Episode: "Henry IV"
1960	Omnibus		Episode: "He Shall Have Power"
1961	Vanity Fair	Sir Pitt Crawley	Mini-series
1961	The Asphalt Jungle	Colonel Welding	Episode: "The Burglary Ring"
1963	Theatre of Stars	Captain William Howard	Episode: "The Fifth Passenger"
1964	The Man from U.N.C.L.E.	Alfred Ghist	Episode: "The Vulcan Affair"
1977	The Andros Targets	Ambassador Kaiwi	Episode: "The Smut Peddler"
1983	Sadat	Rashad	Mini-series
