= Kay Kendall =

English actress and singer (1927–1959)

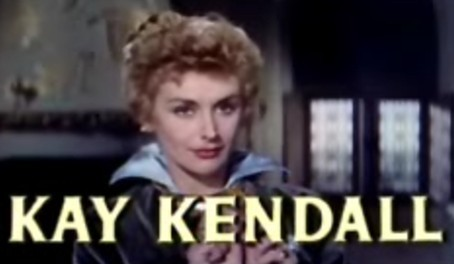
- Kendall in the trailer for The Adventures of Quentin Durward (1955)
- Born: Justine Kay McCarthy; 21 May 1927; Withernsea, East Riding of Yorkshire, England
- Died: 6 September 1959 (aged 32); London, England
- Resting place: Churchyard of St John-at-Hampstead Church, London
- Occupations: Actress, singer
- Years active: 1944–1959
- Spouse: Rex Harrison (m. 1957)
- Relatives: Cavan Kendall (paternal half-brother); Marie Kendall (paternal grandmother)

Justine Kay Kendall McCarthy (21 May 1927 – 6 September 1959) was an English actress and singer. She began her film career in the musical film London Town (1946), a financial failure. Kendall worked regularly until her appearance in the comedy film Genevieve (1953) brought her widespread recognition. Prolific in British films, Kendall also achieved some popularity with American audiences, and won a Golden Globe Award for Best Actress – Motion Picture Musical or Comedy for her role in the musical-comedy film Les Girls (1957).

She began a romantic relationship with actor Rex Harrison after they appeared together in the comedy film The Constant Husband (1955) and they were married in 1957. Harrison learned from Kendall's doctor that she had been diagnosed with myeloid leukaemia, a fact that was kept from Kendall, who believed she was suffering from an iron deficiency. The actor cared for Kendall until her death in 1959 at the age of 32.

== Early life ==
Kendall was born at Stanley House, Hull Road, in Withernsea, a coastal resort in the East Riding of Yorkshire, England. Her father was Terrence Justin "Terry" McCarthy, professionally known as Terry Kendall, a vaudeville performer and variety artist. He was the son of singer-songwriter Stephen McCarthy and the celebrated music-hall performer Marie Kendall, whose father was the Irish music-hall comedian John McCarthy. Kay's mother was the former Gladys Drewery.

She had two elder siblings, Terrence Justin "Terry" Kendall McCarthy and Patricia Kim "Pat" Kendall McCarthy (also known as Kim Kendall). By her father's second marriage to his professional dancing partner, Dora Spencer, she had a younger half-brother, Cavan Spencer Kendall McCarthy (a.k.a. Cavan Kendall). Young Justine attended various schools, including St Leonard's (Brighton), St Margaret's (near Oban, Scotland), and the Lydia Kyasht Dancing Academy (London).

== Career ==
Her first major screen role was in the 1946 musical London Town, one of the more expensive flops in British film history. She co-starred with Petula Clark again in the drama film Dance Hall (1950), and was featured in a quick succession of minor films before achieving fame in Genevieve (1953).

She followed this film with the even more popular first film in the Doctor series, the comedy Doctor in the House (1954) with her friend Dirk Bogarde. She was under contract to the Rank Organisation but unhappy with the parts offered, turning down Value for Money (1955), As Long as They're Happy (1955) and Doctor at Sea (1955).

She appeared in the drama Simon and Laura (1955) with Peter Finch; the comedy Abdulla the Great (1955) with Sydney Chaplin and Gregory Ratoff; and the epic historical film The Adventures of Quentin Durward (1955), with Robert Taylor and Robert Morley. In October 1956, John Davis, managing director of Rank, announced her as one of the actors under contract that Davis thought would become an international star.

In October and November 1957, she appeared in two episodes of the short-lived American television series The Polly Bergen Show. and also starred as herself in Series 3 episode 17 of The Phil Silvers Show on 17 January 1958. The production title was "Phil Silvers Presents Kay Kendall".

In 1958, Kendall won a Golden Globe Award for her performance as Lady Sybil Wren in Les Girls, the story of three showgirls in postwar Paris (with Mitzi Gaynor and Taina Elg). The following year she starred opposite Harrison in the comedy The Reluctant Debutante.

Kendall died in 1959, aged 32, soon after completing her last film, the comedy Once More, with Feeling! (1960), starring opposite Yul Brynner.

=== Critical assessment ===
Stanley Donen, who produced and directed Once More, with Feeling!, said: "She was completely unpredictable. She was an instinctive comedienne with a real clown sense. No one has had it since Carole Lombard – and Kay was a better actress."

"As they say about crime victims, Kay Kendall was in the wrong place at the wrong time," wrote Rhoda Koenig, a critic writing for The Independent in 2006. "In her case, the crime was a waste of talent. One of the most delightful of British actresses... few of her films gave her a chance to shine. A natural screwball heroine, Kendall was born too late for the 1930s comedies in which she would have been the equal of the scatty but scintillating Carole Lombard or Claudette Colbert, and too soon for the naughtiness and absurdity of the 1960s... Kendall was beautiful and funny. She was a true comedienne, unafraid to compromise her ladylike appearance with pratfalls, pop eyes and comic drunk scenes. Kendall could get away with such antics without looking vulgar."

== Personal life ==
Early in her career, Kendall had a lengthy romance with actor Sydney Chaplin, the second son of actor Charlie Chaplin by his second wife, actress Lita Grey. She also had affairs with a Swedish prince and grocery heir James Sainsbury and reportedly had a romance with the future Prince Philip, Duke of Edinburgh.

In 1955, she starred opposite Rex Harrison in The Constant Husband, and they had an affair. Harrison was married to actress Lilli Palmer at the time. However, when he learned from Kendall's doctor that she had been diagnosed with myeloid leukaemia, he and Palmer agreed to divorce so that he could marry Kendall and provide for her care. Kendall married Harrison in 1957.

Kendall never was told of her illness and believed she merely had an iron deficiency. Regarding the divorce, Palmer said she was not upset because she had a lover too. Palmer and Harrison planned to remarry after Kendall's death, but Palmer fell in love with her companion, actor Carlos Thompson, and married him.

== Death ==
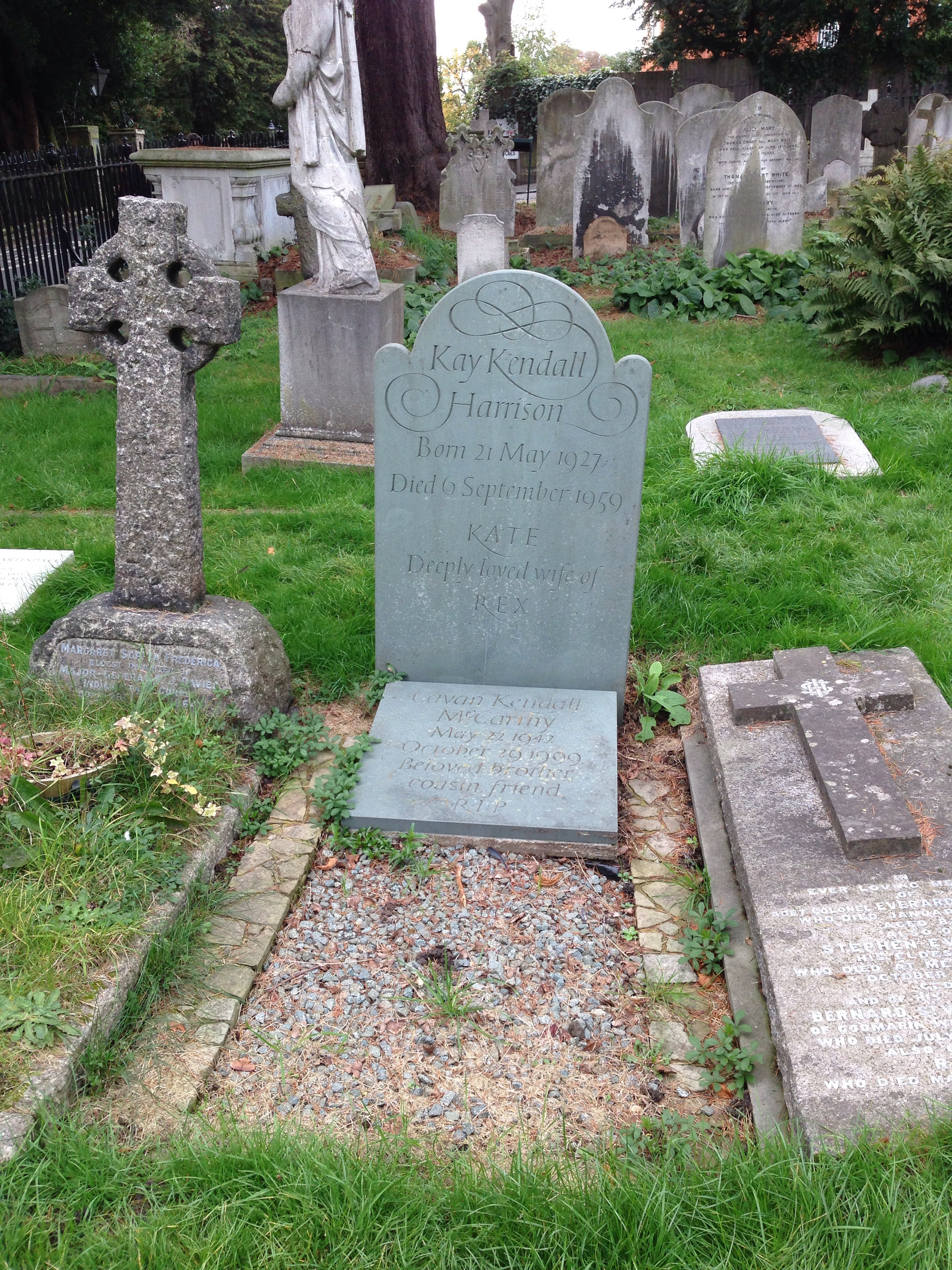
Kendall's grave in October 2016

Kendall died of myeloid leukemia on September 6, 1959, aged 32. Her gravesite is in the churchyard of St John-at-Hampstead Church. Part of the inscription on her gravestone reads "KATE / Deeply loved wife of / REX". In September 2013 her final resting place was restored by the Music Hall Guild of Great Britain and America.

== Legacy ==
Kendall's life is recounted in the 2002 biography The Brief, Madcap Life of Kay Kendall by Eve Golden and Kim Elizabeth Kendall.

Situated near where Kendall once lived, the late 19th-century lighthouse in Withernsea houses a museum that contains exhibits dedicated to local history, including a memorial to Kendall and displays of many artifacts and photographs associated with her life and times.

The Kay Kendall Leukaemia Fund supports scientific research into leukaemia.

On 6 September 2014, a blue plaque commemorating Kay Kendall was erected by the Music Hall Guild of Great Britain and America and unveiled at her former home in Withernsea to mark the 55th anniversary of her death.

== Complete filmography ==
- Champagne Charlie (1944) – Minor Role (uncredited)
- Fiddlers Three (1944) – Girl (uncredited)
- Dreaming (1945) – Party Girl (uncredited)
- Waltz Time (1945) – Lady in Waiting
- Caesar and Cleopatra (1945) – Slave Girl (uncredited)
- London Town (1946) – Patsy
- Night and the City (1950) – One of Helen's Girls (uncredited)
- Dance Hall (1950) – Doreen
- Happy Go Lovely (1951) – Secretary (uncredited)
- Lady Godiva Rides Again (1951) – Sylvia
- The Inch Man (1951) (TV series)
- Sweethearts and Wives (1951) (TV play)
- Wings of Danger (1952) – Alexia LaRoche
- Curtain Up (1952) – Sandra Beverley
- It Started in Paradise (1952) – Lady Caroline Frencham
- Mantrap (1953) – Vera
- Genevieve (1953) – Rosalind Peters
- Street of Shadows (1953) – Barbara Gale
- The Square Ring (1953) – Eve
- Meet Mr Lucifer (1953) – Lonely Hearts Singer
- Fast and Loose (1954) – Carol Hankin
- Doctor in the House (1954) – Isobel Minster
- The Constant Husband (1955) – The 'Wives' – Monica
- Abdulla the Great (1955) – Ronnie
- Simon and Laura (1955) – Laura Foster
- The Adventures of Quentin Durward (1955) – Isabelle, Countess of Marcroy
- Les Girls (1957) – Lady Sybil Wren
- The Reluctant Debutante (1958) – Sheila Broadbent
- Once More, with Feeling! (1960) – Dolly Fabian (released posthumously)

== See also ==
- List of British actors
