= Harry Weldon =

Harry Weldon may refer to:

- Thomas Dewar Weldon (1896–1958), known as Harry, British philosopher
- Harry Weldon (comedian) (1881–1930), English comedian and music hall performer
