= Fred Kitchen =

Fred Kitchen may refer to:

- Fred Kitchen (writer)
- Fred Kitchen (entertainer)
