= The Reluctant Debutante (film) =

1958 film by Vincente Minnelli

- theatrical release poster
- Directed by: Vincente Minnelli
- Screenplay by: William Douglas Home
- Based on: The Reluctant Debutante 1955 by William Douglas Home
- Produced by: Pandro S. Berman
- Starring: Rex Harrison; Kay Kendall; John Saxon; Sandra Dee; Angela Lansbury
- Cinematography: Joseph Ruttenberg
- Edited by: Adrienne Fazan
- Music by: Eddie Warner
- Distributed by: Metro-Goldwyn-Mayer
- Release date: August 14, 1958
- Running time: 95 minutes
- Country: United States
- Language: English
- Budget: $2,250,000
- Box office: $2,980,000

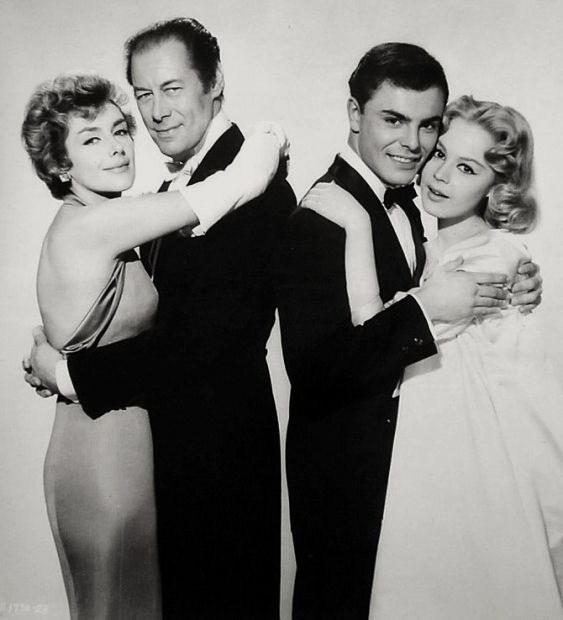
L-R: Kay Kendall, Rex Harrison, John Saxon, and Sandra Dee

The Reluctant Debutante is a 1958 American comedy film directed by Vincente Minnelli and produced by Pandro S. Berman from a screenplay by William Douglas-Home based on Douglas-Home's play of the same name. The music score is by Eddie Warner and the cinematography by Joseph Ruttenberg.

The film stars Rex Harrison and Kay Kendall — who had married in 1957 after they worked together on The Constant Husband (1955) — with featured performances by John Saxon, Sandra Dee, and Angela Lansbury. The setting is London's debutante season amidst the last presentation at Court in 1958. However, because of Harrison's tax problems, the film had to be made in Paris. Harrison had learned from Kendall's doctor that she had been diagnosed with myeloid leukemia, a fact that was kept from Kendall, who believed she was suffering from an iron deficiency. The actor cared for Kendall until her death at the age of 32. She only completed one more film, Once More, with Feeling!, before her death the following year.

In 2003, the film was remade as What a Girl Wants, starring Colin Firth and Amanda Bynes.

== Plot ==
When 17-year-old Jane Broadbent comes to London to live with her wealthy father Lord Jimmy Broadbent, her stepmother Lady Sheila feels compelled by her own social aspirations to introduce Jane to society. Jane is bored by the debutante balls she attends and the young men she is introduced to, but she becomes interested in a drummer named David Parkson who has a reputation for leading young women astray. To complicate matters, an upper-class man with perfect credentials, David Fenner, relentlessly pursues Jane although she openly detests him.

Parkson's reputation is undeserved, but Sheila is convinced otherwise. She tries to keep him away from Jane while her garrulous friend Mabel schemes to secure David Fenner for her own daughter, Clarissa.

Sheila's plans fail miserably. Jane and Parkson fall in love with each other and Parkson proposes to Jane. He also inherits an Italian dukedom which makes him a better "catch" than David Fenner and satisfies Sheila's concerns for Jane's social status.

== Cast ==
- Rex Harrison as Jimmy Broadbent
- Kay Kendall as Sheila Broadbent
- John Saxon as David Parkson
- Sandra Dee as Jane Broadbent
- Angela Lansbury as Mabel Claremont
- Peter Myers as David Fenner
- Diane Clare as Clarissa Claremont
- Charles Cullum as English Colonel (uncredited)
- Sheila Raynor as Maid (uncredited)
- Ambrosine Phillpotts as Miss Grey, Secretary (uncredited)

== Production ==
It was the second of three movies Sandra Dee and John Saxon made together.

== Reception ==
=== Box office ===
The Reluctant Debutante was the 12th most popular film at the British box office in 1959. According to MGM records it earned $1,555,000 in the US and Canada and $1,425,000 elsewhere resulting in a loss of $355,000.

=== Critical ===
Variety called it "refreshing and prettily dressed".

Stanley Kauffmann of The New Republic described The Reluctant Debutante as a "cream-puff".

== See also ==
- List of American films of 1958
