= The Music Hall Guild of Great Britain and America =

Theatre charity in London, England

The Music Hall Guild of Great Britain & America and the Theatre and Film Guild of Great Britain and America
- Official logo
- Formation: 18 September 1985
- Type: Charitable organization
- Purpose: Education, History of Music Hall
- Chairman of Trustees: Matthew Neil
- Founder: Adrian Barry
- Main organ: Board of Trustees
- Website: www.themusichallguild.com

The Music Hall Guild of Great Britain and America and the Theatre and Film Guild of Great Britain and America is a registered theatre charity and non-profit making theatre organisation based in London.

The aims of the Guild are:

1. To advance education through the presentation of music hall and theatre productions and encouragement of the Arts; and
2. To advance education in the history of Music Hall and Theatre performers by undertaking research and identifying, restoring, erecting and beautifying memorials which are of educational Interest.

The Guild's activities include research, the collection of theatre archive, exhibitions, professional theatre productions, reminiscence, educational and restoration projects. The Guild erects commemorative blue plaques and cares for the final resting places of many music hall, variety, vaudeville, musical comedy, theatre and pantomime artistes, including Nelly Power, George Leybourne, Albert Chevalier, Herbert Campbell, Edmund Payne, Kay Kendall, Marie Lloyd, Lupino Lane, Dan Leno and Gabrielle Ray.

The Guild had an income of £57,854 in 2009–10, the majority of which was spent on restoration and commemoration projects.

== Projects ==
Date	Subject	Memorial	Venue	Notes
2009	Music Hall and Variety stars	Variety Artistes Benevolent Fund memorial stone	Streatham Park Cemetery	The stone commemorates over 200 music hall and variety performers buried there. They received a grant from the Heritage Lottery Fund to create a new memorial garden and create an on-line database.
2009	Lupino Lane	Restoration of gravestone	Streatham Park Cemetery	Erected to mark the 50th anniversary of Lane's death, and held a memorial service at the Actors' Church, Covent Garden with a reception at the Theatre Royal, Drury Lane.
8 November 2010	Male impersonator Hetty King	Blue plaque	19 Palmerston Road, Wimbledon	Hetty King's last home
5 March 2011	Music Hall Comedian Austin Rudd	Restoration of gravestone	St Lawrence Church, Morden	
25 September 2011	Music Hall star Marie Kendall	Blue plaque	Okeover Manor, Clapham Common Northside	Marie Kendall's last home in Clapham
26 November 2011	Music Hall comedian Herbert Campbell	Restoration of gravestone	Abney Park Cemetery	
10 March 2012	Musical Comedy actress Marie Studholme	Blue plaque and restoration of gravestone	East Finchley Cemetery	
11 May 2012	Music Hall star Nelly Power	Restoration of gravestone	Abney Park Cemetery	
3 August 2012	Music Hall star Dan Crawley	Restoration of gravestone	Abney Park Cemetery	Rededicated his memorial on 21 October 2012 to mark the 100th anniversary of Crawley's death and re-cleaned in March 2016.
27 August 2012	Composer G. W. Hunt	Restoration of gravestone	Abney Park Cemetery	
30 September 2012	Music Hall impresario Fred Karno	Blue plaque	Clockwork Studios, Southwell Road, Camberwell	Erected at Fred Karno's former Fun Factory where the likes of Charles Chaplin, Fred Kitchen and Stan Laurel learn their skills.
20 October 2012	Music Hall star Walter Laburnum	Restoration of gravestone	Abney Park Cemetery	
8 May 2013	Music Hall star Fred Albert	Restoration of gravestone	Abney Park Cemetery	
22 September 2013	Actress Kay Kendall	Restoration of gravestone	St John-at-Hampstead Church in Hampstead, London	
28 September 2013	Music Hall star Alice Lloyd	Restoration of gravestone	All Saints Churchyard, Banstead, Surrey	
7 October 2013	Music Hall star Marie Lloyd	Blue plaque	37 Woodstock Road, Golders Green	Marie Lloyd's last home
20 October 2013	Music Hall star Alice Lloyd	Blue plaque	239 Banstead Road, Surrey	Alice Lloyd's last home
15 June 2014	Lupino Lane	Blue plaque	32 Maida Vale, London	Lupino Lane's former home
29 June 2014	Comedian & Actor Edmund Payne	Restoration of memorial	Abney Park Cemetery	
21 August 2014	Music Hall performer Joe O'Gorman (senior)	Restoration of memorial	Putney Vale Cemetery	
6 September 2014	Kay Kendall	Blue plaque	61 Hull Road, Withernsea, East Yorkshire	The house where Kay Kendall was born
2 October 2014	Nellie Farren	Restoration of memorial	Brompton Cemetery	
2 October 2014	Farren Soutar	Restoration of memorial	Brompton Cemetery	
18 October 2014	Gus Elen	Restoration of memorial	Streatham Park Cemetery	Gus Elen grave restored
30 May 2015	Music Hall Performer Lew Lake	Restoration of memorial	Abney Park Cemetery	
5 September 2015	Music Hall Comedian Austin Rudd	Blue plaque	254 Edgware Road, London W2 1DS	
25 November 2015	Comedian Herbert Campbell	Blue plaque	44 Lawford Road, Hackney	
16 February 2016	Comedian Stanley Lupino	Blue plaque	33 Ardbeg Road, Herne Hill, London	
16 February 2016	Actress and Director Ida Lupino	Blue plaque	33 Ardbeg Road, Herne Hill, London	The birthplace of Ida Lupino
27 March 2016	Comedian Fred Kitchen	Restoration of Grave	West Norwood Cemetery	
27 March 2016	Pantomimist R. H. Kitchen	Restoration of Grave	West Norwood Cemetery	
29 July 2016	Actor Fred Allandale	Restoration of Grave	Abney Park Cemetery	
29 July 2016	Actress Maie Ash	Restoration of Grave	Abney Park Cemetery	
12 August 2016	Harry Nicholls (comedian)	Restoration of Grave	Old Chiswick Cemetery	
14 August 2016	Actress Fannie Leslie	Restoration of Grave	St Pancras and Islington Cemetery	
15 September 2016	Music Hall comedian Jenny Hill (music hall performer)	Restoration of Grave	Nunhead Cemetery	
3 November 2016	Tom McNaughton (Comedian)	Restoration of Grave	Hampstead Cemetery	
5 November 2016	Harry Hunter (Composer and Vocalist)	Restoration of Grave	Abney Park Cemetery	Harry Hunter was one third of the prolific music publishers Francis, Day and Hunter
6 November 2016	George Leybourne (Music Hall Vocalist)	Restoration of Grave	Abney Park Cemetery	
6 November 2016	Albert Chevalier (Actor, Comedian, Lyricist and Vocalist)	Restoration of Grave	Abney Park Cemetery	
24 February 2017	Edward Lewis (Actor and Comedian)	Restoration of Grave	Brockley and Ladywell Cemeteries	
30 June 2017	Samuel Lockhart (Acrobat, Clown & Equestrian)	Restoration of Grave	Brockley and Ladywell Cemeteries	Father of George and Samuel Lockhart famous elephant trainers.
2 July 2017	William Pinder (Circus Proprietor)	Restoration of Grave	West Norwood Cemetery	
16 July 2017	Edmund Payne	Blue Plaque	West Heath Avenue Hampstead	Edmund Payne's last home.
29 July 2017	Harry Randall (actor)	Restoration of Grave	Hampstead Cemetery	
14 August 2017	Nelly Power	Blue Plaque	97 Southgate Road Islington	
1 September 2017	Lottie Collins	Restoration of Grave	St Pancras and Islington Cemetery	
11 September 2017	Harry Weldon (comedian)	Restoration of Grave	Hampstead Cemetery	
2 October 2017	Ben Greet	Restoration of Grave	Charlton Cemetery	
25 November 2017	Kate Carney	Restoration of Grave	Putney Vale Cemetery	
23 December 2017	Tony Walsh (Comic Juggler)	New Memorial	Streatham Park Cemetery	
23 December 2017	Agar Young (Acrobat and Pantomimist)	New Memorial	Streatham Park Cemetery	Agar Young was born John Davidson MacDonald in Scotland and started out as one half of the music hall duo Agar and Young
15 June 2018	Nora Posford (Actress and Comedienne)	Restoration of Grave	Abney Park Cemetery	
24 August 2018	Anne Shelton (singer) Singer	Restoration of Grave	Camberwell New Cemetery	
14 November 2018	Gabrielle Ray (Actress and Dancer)	New Memorial	Englefield Green Cemetery	
17 May 2019	Margot Fonteyn	Blue Plaque	3 Elm Grove Road Ealing	This plaque marked the 100th anniversary of Fonteyn's birth
7 July 2019	Thora Hird	Blue Plaque	Leinster Mews Bayswater	
12 February 2020	Marie Lloyd	Blue Plaque	73 Carleton Road, Tuffnell Park N7	This plaque marked the 150th anniversary of Marie Lloyd's birth
13 July 2020	Percy Anderson	New memorial	All Saint's Churchyard, Crondall	This new memorial stone for Percy Anderson marks his grave which has remained anonymous for 92 years
