= Austin Rudd =

Music hall comedian and vocalist

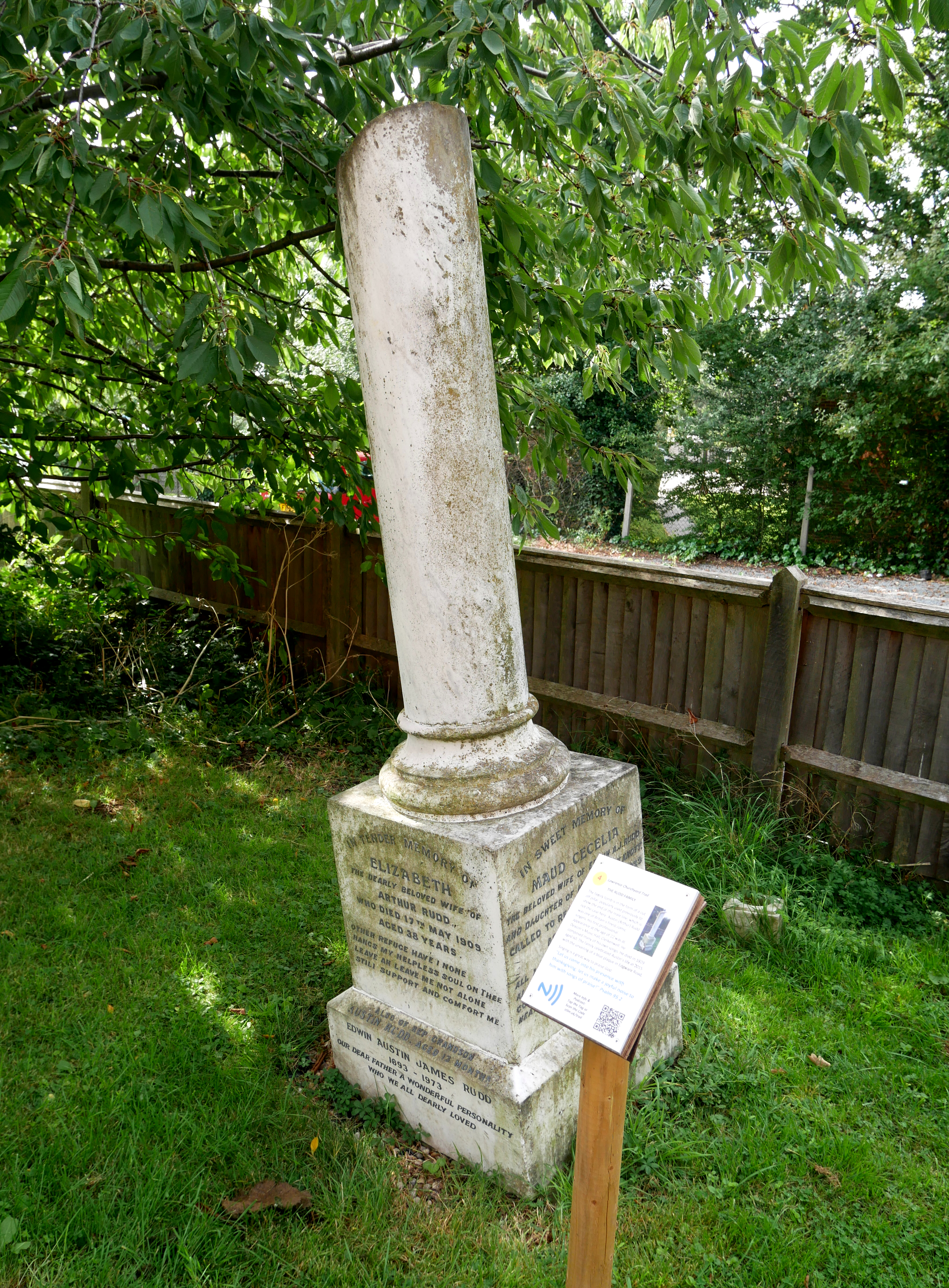
The Rudd family memorial to the west of the Church of Saint Lawrence in Morden

Austin Rudd (4 December 1868 – 24 March 1929) was a British music hall comedian and vocalist.

== Biography ==
Rudd was born in London and made his first professional stage appearance at the age of 22 at Deacons Music Hall in Clerkenwell, where a reviewer called him a "comedian of decidedly modern stamp".

For the next forty years Rudd performed with success in all the major London music halls and in the British provinces as well as undertaking a number of tours abroad to the United States, South Africa, Australia and New Zealand.

He had a large repertoire of songs, many of which he wrote and composed himself, including "Sailors Don’t Care", "Here We Suffer Grief and Pain" and "She Was In My Class".

Rudd continued to work right up to his death in 1929, aged 60. He was buried in his family grave at St Lawrence Church, Morden.

== Legacy ==
A commemorative blue plaque was unveiled at his former home at 254 Edgware Road, London, on September 5, 2015, by The Music Hall Guild of Great Britain and America
