= Cavan Kendall =

British actor

- Kendall in 1963
- Born: Cavan Spencer Kendall McCarthy; 22 May 1942; Edinburgh, Scotland
- Died: 29 October 1999 (aged 57); Gloucestershire, England
- Occupation: Actor
- Relatives: Kay Kendall (paternal half-sister); Marie Kendall (paternal grandmother)

Cavan Spencer Kendall McCarthy (22 May 1942 – 29 October 1999) was a Scottish actor.

== Life ==
Kendall was born in Edinburgh, Scotland. His mother, Dora Wynne (née Spencer) (25 Oct 1913 - 18 Sep 1959), died when he was seventeen. His father, Terrence McCarthy (a.k.a. Terry Kendall) (20 Jan 1901 - 03 Jan 1994), was the son of music hall comedian and actress Marie Kendall (1873–1964). Through his father, Kendall was also a half-brother of actress Kay Kendall.

He died of cancer in Gloucestershire at the age of 57.

== Career ==
Amongst his theatre work, Kendall appeared opposite Sarah Miles in the original West End production of Vivat! Vivat Regina! at the Piccadilly Theatre, and in Justice is a Woman at the Vaudeville (as well as its subsequent TV version opposite Margaret Lockwood). He acted in many television series, including the BBC's 1957 version of The Railway Children, Thriller, in "Dial a Deadly Number" 1975, and the Doctor Who story The Myth Makers in the role of Achilles. He appeared in the films Here We Go Round the Mulberry Bush (1968), Eureka (1983), The Clandestine Marriage (1999) and Sexy Beast (2000). Kendall died shortly after the filming of Sexy Beast and did not see the critically acclaimed film which has become a cult classic.
