= Fred Allandale =

British actor

- Born: Frederick Arnold; 4 July 1872; London, England, United Kingdom of Great Britain and Ireland
- Died: 23 December 1921 (aged 49); Birmingham, England, United Kingdom
- Spouse: Maie Ash

Fred Allandale (4 July 1872 – 23 December 1921) was a British musical comedy actor, comedian and producer.

== Biography ==
Allandale was born Frederick Arnold in Camberwell, London, on 4 July 1872, the son of Alfred Arnold and Sophia Hudson. He was the grandson of the Irish comedian James Hudson. He was educated at Christ's Hospital and worked as an accountant.

Performing using the stage name of Fred Allandale, his first stage appearance was in The Geisha at the Theatre Royal Lincoln on 7 February 1898, playing Lieutenant Cuningham. On 28 August 1905, he played Bobbie Scott in The Blue Moon at the Lyric Theatre. He toured with the comedy sketch The Soldier and the Girl. He also produced his own Pierrot Company in Blackpool.

His second wife was the musical comedy actress Maie Ash. Allandale died on 23 December 1921 in Birmingham from a heart attack and was buried in Abney Park Cemetery. The Music Hall Guild of Great Britain and America restored his grave on 29 July 2016.
