= The Lady from the Sea (Sunday Night Theatre) =

- Sunday Night Theatre episode
- Written by: Max Faber
- Based on: The Lady from the Sea by Henrik Ibsen
- Original air date: 10 May 1953
- Running time: 105 minutes

"The Lady from the Sea" is a 1953 episode of Sunday Night Theatre that is significant as one of the earliest extant examples of British television drama, along with an earlier episode of the series titled "It is Midnight, Doctor Schweitzer" and the first two episodes of The Quatermass Experiment. An adaptation of the 1888 play by Norwegian playwright Henrik Ibsen, it was performed twice, first on 10 May 1953 and again on the 14th. One of these live transmissions was recorded using the then-experimental telerecording process.

== Cast ==
- Irene Worth as Ellida
- Robert Harris as Wangel
- Hamlyn Benson as Ballested
- Eric Berry as Arnholm
- Douglas Campbell as The Stranger
- Paul Harding as Lyngstrand (as Brian Harding)
- Sarah Lawson as Bolette
- Jane Wenham as Hilda

== Reception ==
John Wyver, reviewing the programme in 2011, said "even nearly sixty years on, few allowances have to be made for it to be enjoyed as small-screen drama of the first order" and "Irene Worth demands attention and captures the eye in just the way that I recall Vanessa Redgrave doing at the Roundhouse"
