= Fannie Leslie =

- Born: Fanny Catherine Annesley; 13 June 1856; Soho, London, England
- Died: 8 February 1935 (aged 78); London
- Occupations: Music hall singer, dancer, actress
- Years active: 1872–1905

Fannie Leslie (born Fanny Catherine Annesley, 13 June 1856 – 8 February 1935) was an English music hall singer, dancer and actress.

== Life and career ==
She was born in Soho, the daughter of a solicitor. She spent time in the United States as a child, and first performed on stage there in 1872. After returning to England and appearing in London and Oxford the following year, she played in the United States in 1875, as a dancer in Lydia Thompson's Burlesque Troupe in Broadway shows.

After returning to England, she married theatre and music hall manager Walter Gooch (1850–1899) in 1878, and appeared in plays under his management at the Princess's Theatre. She developed as a serio-comic performer, both in music halls and on the theatre stage, styling herself as 'The Queen of Burlesque'. Among her songs were "The Little Pirate of the Nore", and "The Nineteenth Century Boys", a "masher" song which she performed dressed as a man. In 1888, she featured in F. C. Burnand's burlesque play The Latest Edition of Black-Eyed Susan, playing opposite Dan Leno. She also regularly performed in pantomimes, as a principal boy, and is credited with introducing cartwheels onto the stage in 1893.

She and Gooch divorced in 1891, and in 1902 she married William Charles Broughton Wilson (1873–1949). She retired from the stage in about 1905, and died in 1935. In 2016, her gravestone in St Pancras and Islington Cemetery was restored by the Music Hall Guild.
