= Marie Kendall =

British music hall performer (1873–1964)

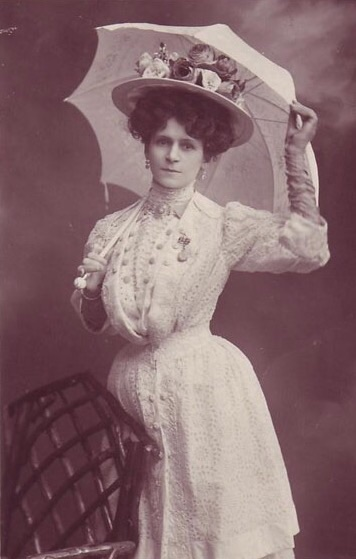
- Born: Mary Ann Florence Holyome; 27 July 1873; Bethnal Green, Middlesex, England
- Died: 5 May 1964 (aged 90); Clapham, London, England
- Occupations: Music hall comedian, actress
- Spouse: Stephen McCarthy (m. 1895)
- Children: 4
- Relatives: Kay Kendall (granddaughter); Cavan Kendall (grandson)

Marie Kendall (born Mary Ann Florence Holyome; 27 July 1873 – 5 May 1964) was a British music hall comedian and actress who had a successful career spanning 50 years.

== Biography ==
Kendall was born Mary Ann Florence Holyome on 27 July 1873 in Bethnal Green, London. At five years of age, she appeared onstage as "Baby Chester", beginning her career in music halls. When she was 15, she took the roles of principal boy in Aladdin and Dandini in Cinderella. For several years she toured England, Wales and Germany as a male impersonator. She enjoyed significant success in 1893 when she turned to female roles and sang "I'm One of the Girls" over 16 weeks in Camden Town. After that, Kendall performed at major venues in London, securing parts in pantomimes as well as singing Cockney songs in the best music halls. Her income dramatically increased. During the 1920s she toured Australia.

In 1931, Kendall was an original star of the Vintage Variety Company. In the following year she performed in the Royal Variety Performance. She remained a regular stage performer well into her sixties, and retired from the stage in 1939.

== Personal life ==
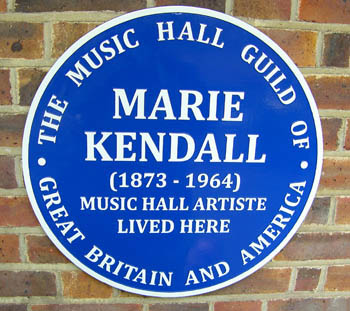
Marie Kendall's plaque, 2011

In 1895, Kendall married singer-songwriter Stephen McCarthy, the son of Irish music hall comedian John McCarthy. The couple had four children: Terence, Shaun, Moya, and Pat. As adults, Terry and Pat were a successful brother-sister dance act. Terry's daughter was the actress Kay Kendall.

== Death ==
Marie Kendall died on 5 May 1964 in Clapham, London. On 25 September 2011 a commemorative blue plaque was erected to Marie Kendall by the theatre charity The Music Hall Guild of Great Britain and America at her former residence in Clapham.

== Legacy ==
Kendall happened to be performing in Dublin on 16 June 1904, the date on which the action of James Joyce's novel Ulysses is set, and a supposed poster depicting her as a "charming soubrette" becomes a minor motif in the book.

== Filmography ==
- Say It with Flowers (1934)
