= Harry Weldon (comedian) =

British comedian (1881–1930)

- Born: James Henry Stanley; 1 February 1881; Liverpool, England
- Died: 10 March 1930 (aged 49); London, England
- Occupation: Music hall comedian
- Spouses: Clarice Mabel Holt (1902–1925, divorced); one daughter: Mabel (b. 1906); Hilda Glyder (1926–1930, Weldon's death)

Harry Weldon (1 February 1881 – 10 March 1930) was an English comedian and music hall performer popular in the 1910s.

== Life and career ==
Weldon was born James Henry Stanley in Liverpool, England on 1 February 1881.

He made his first stage appearance in the Tivoli Music Hall in Barrow in March 1900, making his London debut that year in the Marylebone Music Hall. He appeared with Fred Karno’s troupe and Charlie Chaplin in 1910 at the Nottingham Empire. He was known for having eyes that seemed always shut, and for speaking with a whistle - especially when saying his catchphrase: "'s no use". Among several comic characters, ‘Stiffy the Goal-keeper’ was perhaps the most popular. He performed at the Royal Variety Performance in 1922.

Weldon married twice: first on 29 August 1902, to Clarice Mabel Holt. They had a daughter, Mabel, in September 1906. The couple formally separated in March 1922, and divorced in 1925. Weldon's second marriage was in June 1926 to American Hilda Glyder, who was some 16 years younger than Clarice. Weldon died at 132 Maida Vale on 10 March 1930, leaving his widow just over £1,000. He is buried in Hampstead Cemetery. The Music Hall Guild of Great Britain and America restored Weldon's grave from a dilapidated state in or around 2017.

Weldon was an advocate for women’s football, organising a number of matches in the early 20th century. The most notable took place on 14 February 1921, when he invited Dick, Kerr Ladies to Anfield to play his own side which was made up of the best players from the rest of Britain, including one player travelling as far as the island of Unst in the Shetland Isles. The prize was The Harry Weldon Cup in aid of unemployed ex-servicemen, which is on display at the National Football Museum in Manchester. A record 25,000 fans were in attendance that day as Dick, Kerr Ladies went on to win 9-1.

== Widow and daughter ==
Weldon's widow, Hilda Glyder, was herself a popular music hall singer and comedienne. She returned to the stage for some years after Weldon's death. Walter Sickert painted her singing "You'd Be Surprised" in about 1923. Hilda remarried and died in New York in 1962. Weldon's daughter Mabel also went on the stage, as Maisie Weldon. There exists a 1941 British Pathé film clip of Maisie Weldon singing and doing impersonations, including one of her father.
