= Fred Karno =

British comedian (1866–1941)

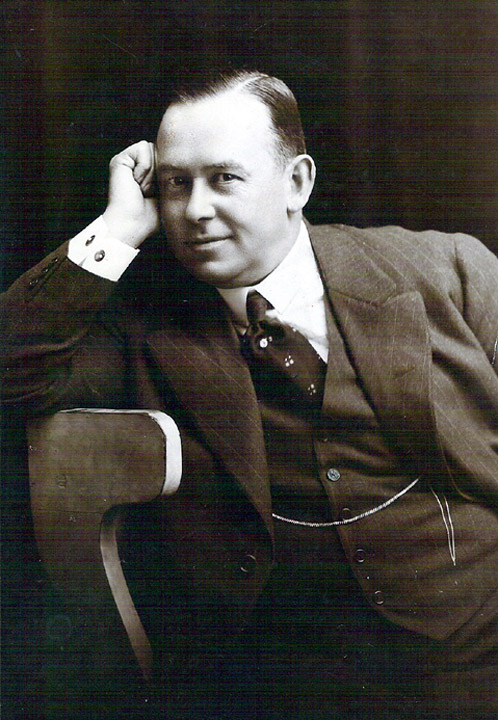
- Born: Frederick John Westcott; 26 March 1866; Exeter, Devon, England
- Died: 17 September 1941 (aged 75); Lilliput, Dorset, England
- Occupations: Comedian, theatre impresario of music hall
- Spouse(s): Edith Karno (nee Cuthbert), Marie Karno (nee Moore)
- Website: https://www.fredkarno.com/

Frederick John Westcott (26 March 1866 – 17 September 1941), best known by his stage name Fred Karno, was an English vaudeville impresario of the British music hall. As a comedian of slapstick he is credited with popularizing the custard-pie-in-the-face gag. During the 1890s, in order to circumvent stage censorship, Karno developed a form of sketch comedy without dialogue.

Early sketches such as Jail Birds (1895), in which prisoners play tricks on warders, and Early Birds (1899), showing the poverty and realities of London's East End poor, can be seen as precursors of silent movie comedy. His innovative 1904 sketch Mumming Birds, produced for the Hackney Empire in London, became the longest-running sketch the music halls produced. Many of his comics subsequently worked in film and used Karno material throughout their work. Film producer Hal Roach stated: "Fred Karno is not only a genius, he is the man who originated slapstick comedy. We in Hollywood owe much to him."

Among the music hall comedians who worked for Karno were Charlie Chaplin and his understudy, Arthur Stanley Jefferson, who later adopted the name of Stan Laurel. These were the alumni of Karno's comedy companies, all of whom trained at his headquarters called The Fun Factory, in Vaughan Road, Camberwell, southeast London. Such was Karno's fame that his name became associated with any chaotic situation, and the disorganised volunteer soldiers of the Great War labelled themselves "Fred Karno's Army". The phrase was also adapted into a trench song in World War I, to the tune of the hymn "The Church's One Foundation". In World War II it was adapted as the Anthem of the Guinea Pig Club, the first line becoming "We are McIndoe's Army ...". The song also features in the musical comedy film Oh! What a Lovely War (1969).

== Biography ==
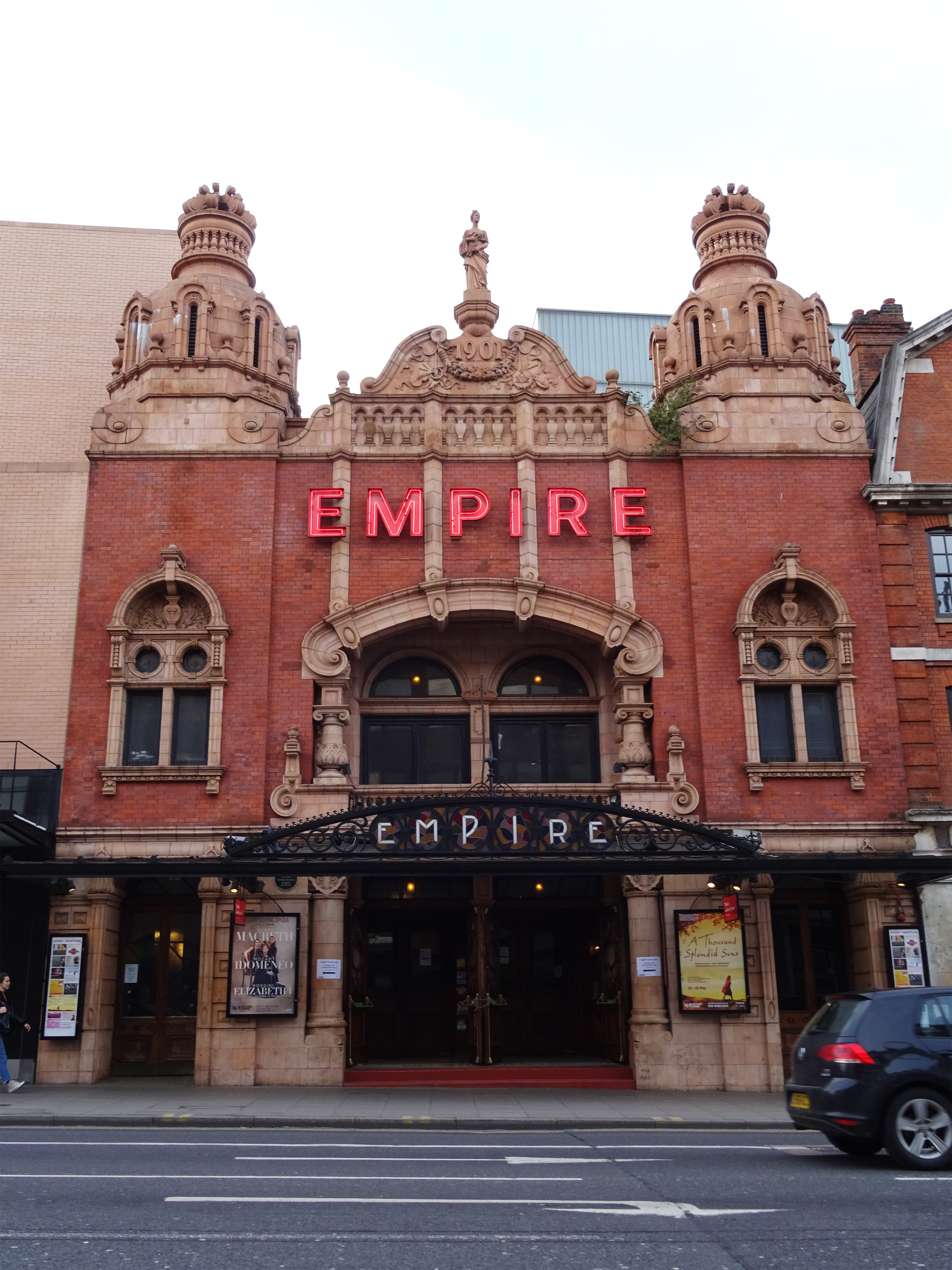
In 1904, Karno's Komics produced a new sketch for the Hackney Empire in London called Mumming Birds, which included the pie in the face gag among other new innovations.

Karno was born in Exeter, Devon, England, in 1866. His father was a cabinet maker, although Karno's first career was as a plumber's apprentice. A chance encounter at a gymnasium led to Karno taking up acrobatics, and around 1882 Karno joined forces with an older performer called Olvene, and ran away with the circus. He subsequently worked as a solo acrobat and as part of a troupe called The Four Aubreys. Whilst with the Aubreys he met Edith Cuthbert who worked in the box office at Stockport Theatre Royal. They married in 1889. In 1891 his son, Fred Karno Jr. (born Frederick Arthur Westcott) was born. As a young man Karno had busked at Molesey near Tagg's Island on London's River Thames and in 1912 he leased the island and the existing hotel. He demolished the original hotel and hired architect Frank Matcham to build The Karsino. With the advent of cinema, the music hall's popularity declined and as a result of this decline, Karno went bankrupt in 1927.

On 27 May 1927, his wife Edith, from whom he had been separated since 1904, died in her sleep of diabetes. Karno then was able to marry his long-time partner, Marie Moore. Karno went to the US in September 1929, and was hired by the Hal Roach Studios as a writer-director, thanks to the support of one of his former protégés, Stan Laurel. However, his stay at the studio was brief and unsuccessful. Hal Roach later said that Karno's main abilities were as a producer, although in reality Karno appears to have been the victim of cost cutting at the studio following the Wall Street crash of 1929. He left the studio in February 1930 and returned to England later that spring. On his return to Britain, he launched a show called Laffs which was later licensed by George Black as the basis of shows for the newly formed Crazy Gang. He later helped to write and produce several short films, some of which starred members of the Gang. In 1932 he returned to the theatre with a show called Real Life.

Karno spent his last years in southwest England in the village of Lilliput, Dorset, as a part-owner of an off-licence, and died there in 1941 from diabetes, aged 75.

== Legacy ==
"Chaplin remained the great observer of the absurdity of life's endless struggles, an actor trained with Karno's "Speechless Comedians" to express each thought and attitude in mime."

— Simon Louvish in The Guardian on the influence of Karno on Chaplin, one of the many music hall comedians who worked for him.

As a music hall impresario, Karno was hugely influential on comedy – not least in recruiting and training a generation of comics who went on to fame and fortune in their own right, notably: Stan Laurel, Charlie Chaplin, Will Hay, Fred Kitchen, Syd Walker, Sydney Chaplin, Eric Campbell, Sandy Powell, Max Miller, Frank Randle, Billie Ritchie, Billy Bennett, Walter Groves, Billy Reeves, Jimmy Nervo, of Nervo and Knox, and many more. These comedians were the backbone of British variety throughout the first half of the 20th century, and many were recruited by fledgling studios in Hollywood as the cream of physical slapstick comedy.

Karno was also an innovator: he choreographed mime shows for his own troupe, Karno's Komics, and brought slapstick circus comedy to the music hall which included his 1904 sketch Mumming Birds, featuring a number of new innovations including the pie in the face gag; its success saw it become the longest-running sketch the music halls produced. He also possibly developed the first use of the revolve in Britain, bringing together troupes of comics and in doing so, developed sketch comedy; he was instrumental in establishing copyright protections for stage productions against the threat from film; and was a pioneer of adding musical accompaniment to stage slapstick. In his autobiography Stan Laurel wrote, "Fred Karno didn't teach Charlie [Chaplin] and me all we know about comedy. He just taught us most of it".

Calling Karno "a master of publicity", Samantha Ellis in The Guardian writes that "one of his favourite tricks was to drive a red Rolls-Royce scattering flyers as he went". Karno's reputation and legacy was significantly tarnished by a salacious biography: Master of Mirth and Tears (1971) by J. P. Gallagher, but this text has now been largely discredited by the 2021 biography by David B Crump: Fred Karno, the Legend Behind the Laughter.

The American writer Trav S.D., author of No Applause, Just Throw Money: The Book That Made Vaudeville Famous, has proclaimed Crump's biography as "definitive, full of original primary research and then digested and turned into perceptive and entertaining prose", adding "there is a tendency to restrict Karno mentally to the British music hall in which he was so central, and to associate him almost entirely with his two best known creative progeny (Chaplin and Laurel). But that doesn't do him enough justice. Given the minor fact that between them Chaplin and Laurel largely wrote the rules for screen comedy, it might be well to think of Karno as a Socrates to their Aristotle and Xenophon. In that respect, he has hands over all of 20th century culture. Crump's strongly worded formulation is the one we should all now go by, calling Karno "the most significant exponent of sketch comedy and physical slapstick the stage has ever seen".

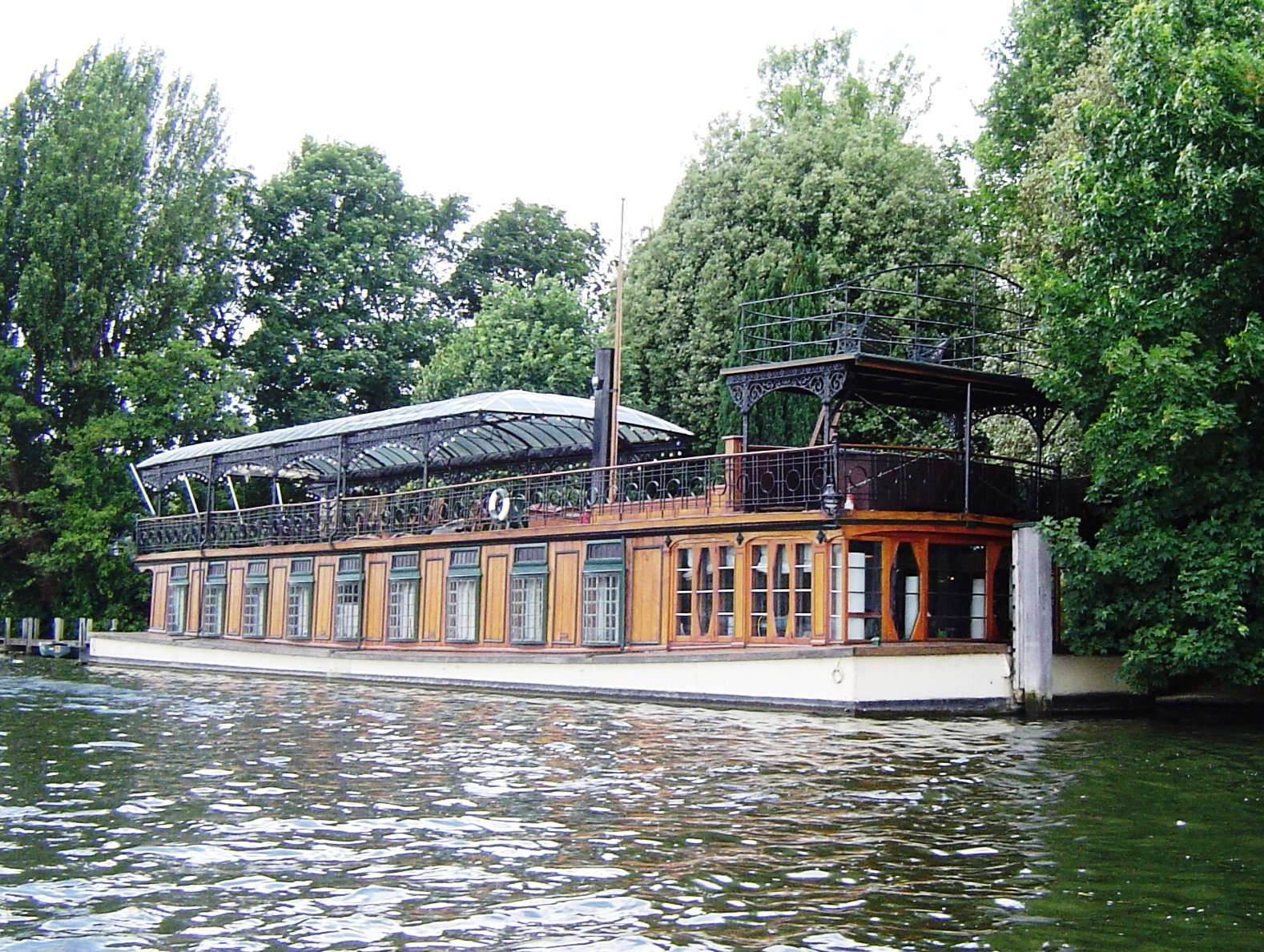
Karno's Astoria houseboat from the river

Karno's houseboat, the Astoria, on the River Thames at Hampton, Middlesex, is now used as a recording studio by Pink Floyd's David Gilmour.

On 30 September 2012, the Music Hall Guild of Great Britain and America unveiled a commemorative blue plaque to Karno at his former studios at 38 Southwell Road, Camberwell, in south London.

Karno's role in Charlie Chaplin's rise to fame was highlighted in the biopic Chaplin (1992), where Karno was played by British actor John Thaw. The film included a brief routine based on Karno's sketch Mumming Birds. The sketch, known as A Night in an English Music Hall when Chaplin performed it on tour, was also the basis for Chaplin's 1915 film, A Night in the Show.

Karno's comedy companies were the basis of a trilogy of novels, The Fun Factory, by Chris England.
