= Sunday Night Theatre =

British TV drama series (1950–1959)

- Starring: Richard Caldicot; George Woodbridge; Robert Brown; Michael Brennan; Brian Rix; John Vere; Carl Bernard; Patrick Barr; Eric Maturin; Larry Noble; Henry Oscar; Beatrice Varley; Victor Platt; Alan Wheatley; George Skillan; Peter Sallis; Nora Gordon; Timothy Bateson
- Country of origin: United Kingdom
- Original language: English
- No. of episodes: 721 plays (27 survive)

Original release
- Network: BBC Television
- Release: 5 March 1950 – 20 December 1959

Related
- BBC Sunday-Night Play

Sunday Night Theatre is a series of televised live television plays screened by BBC Television from 1950 until 1959.

The productions for the first five years or so of the run were re-staged live the following Thursday, partly because of technical limitations in this era, and the theatrical basis of early television drama. Some of the earliest collaborations between Rudolph Cartier and Nigel Kneale were produced for this series, including Arrow to the Heart (1952, 1956) and Nineteen Eighty-Four (1954). The Sunday night drama slot was subsequently renamed The Sunday-Night Play which ran for four seasons between 1960 and 1963. ITV transmitted its own unrelated run of Sunday Night Theatre between 1969 and 1974.

== Archive status ==
The overwhelming majority of the run (1950–1959) of 721 plays are missing from television archives; only 27 are believed to still exist as telerecordings. The Thursday 'repeat performance; of Nineteen Eighty-Four survives in this form. (See Wiping.)

Also among the surviving episodes are at least two from 1953, It Is Midnight, Dr. Schweitzer and The Lady from the Sea. A recording of the soundtrack of the production of Requiem for a Heavyweight broadcast in March 1957, which features Sean Connery in the lead role, was recovered in 2014.
