= Maie Ash =

British musical comedy actress and dancer

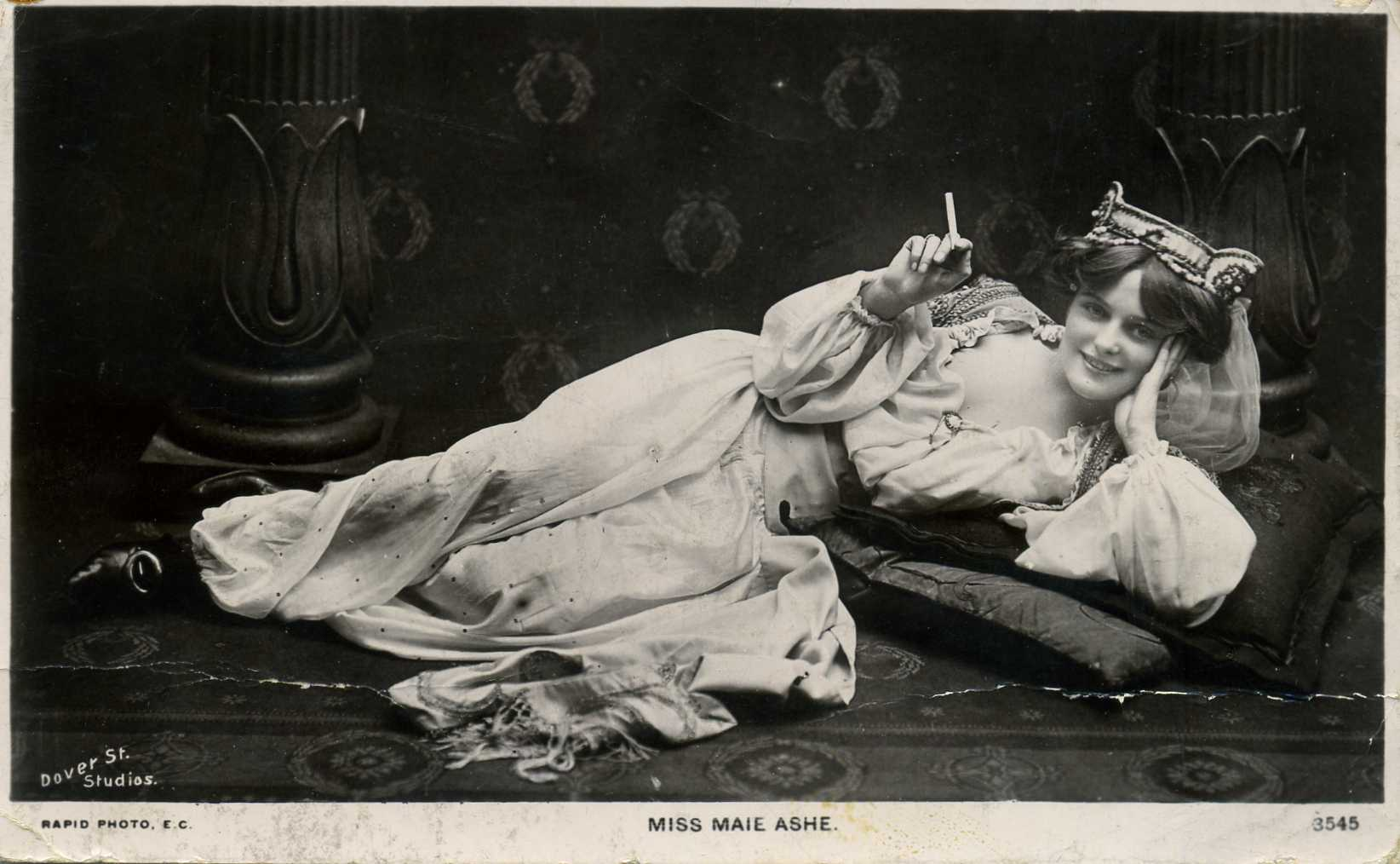
- Born: Eleanor Mabel Eugenie Ash; 31 May 1888; Clapton, London
- Died: 13 December 1923 (aged 35); Marine Parade, Brighton
- Burial place: Abney Park Cemetery
- Occupations: Actress; dancer

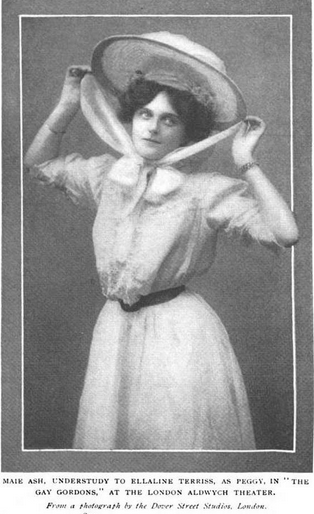
Maie Ash, from a 1908 publication.

Maie Ash (31 May 1888 – 13 December 1923) was a British musical comedy actress and dancer.

== Biography ==
She was born Eleanor Mabel Eugenie Ash in Clapton, London on 31 May 1888. Her parents were James Thomas Waterman Ash, a book-keeper originally from Poplar in East London, and Eleanor Mary Ash (nee Young). She was an only child and brought up in Hackney.

Ash made her first London appearance in 1902 at the Shaftesbury Theatre in A Little Un-fairy Princess before moving into the title role of Cinderella the following year at Southampton. In 1904 she played Margo in Goody Two Shoes at Liverpool and understudied the role of Pansy at the Vaudeville Theatre in London. Other musical comedies include Yellow Fog Island at Terry's Theatre and My Darling at the Hicks Theatre in 1907. Reflecting on her early career she said, '... I always wanted to get on the stage. When I was a child, I used to sing and dance'.

She married actor Stanley Brett, the brother of Seymour Hicks in 1909. The couple had one daughter, Margaret Mabel Ellaline Hicks, who was born in Kensington in 1910. Brett and Maie divorced in a widely-publicised case in 1913, Brett having petitioned on the grounds of Maie's adultery with comedian Fred Allandale. Maie subsequently married Allandale on Saturday 15 May 1915, at Hackney Register Office.

Maie Ash died on 13 December 1923 at Marine Parade, Brighton, after an eight-month illness, at the age of 35. She is buried in Abney Park Cemetery.
