= Fred Kitchen (entertainer) =

English actor and entertainer (1872–1951)

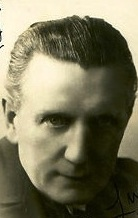
Publicity photo of English music hall entertainer Frederick Thomas Kitchen, taken 1935

Fred Kitchen (15 June 1873 – 1 April 1951) was an English music hall star, comic and entertainer.

== Life and work ==
Fred Kitchen was born Frederick Thomas Kitchen in the parish of St John's, London. His father, Richard Henry Kitchen (1830–1910), was a music hall actor for sixty years, beginning his stage work at the age of seven with Messrs Frampton and Frenton in London's Waterloo Road. His Daily Telegraph obituary noted "An actor like Kitchen played everything. It was, however, as a harlequin, clown and pantomimist that he chiefly shone".

Fred Kitchen's first role was in the Prince's Theatre Portsmouth, appearing in The Dumb Man of Manchester. He was discovered by theatre impresario Fred Karno whilst playing a small part in a sketch at the Princess's Theatre Glasgow. The chief comedian at the theatre had to be replaced immediately and Kitchen was chosen to take the role. It began a 50-year career as a headliner. He was the lead comedian with Karno's company from 1897 to 1910, starring in comic works such as the highly popular His Majesty's Guests. Charlie Chaplin, managed by Karno, was influenced by Kitchen's comic style, his splayed walk and scruffy costume. Chaplin commented "A part of the [tramp] character was inspired by Fred Kitchen, an old fellow-trouper of mine in vaudeville. He had flat feet." The sketch that Karno and Kitchen co-wrote, entitled "The Football Match", made Kitchen's name. He was known for the catchphrase "Meredith, we're in!" from The Baliffs (1907), a sketch which toured the country for many years. The catchphrase's popularity was helped by the fact that footballer Billy Meredith (1874–1958), had transferred from Manchester City Football Club to Manchester United. The line was carved on Kitchen's tombstone.

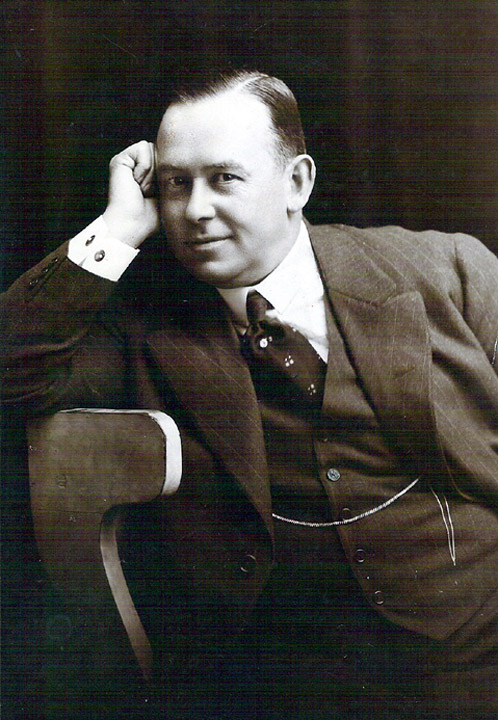
Fred Karno, circa 1918

=== Later years ===
In 1913, Kitchen gave a Royal Command Performance for King George V. The entertainer later went solo, and became known for sketches including "Private Potts" and "How to Cook a Sausage". In the 1920s and 1930s he appeared in musical revues; however, with the advent of film and radio, the heyday of music hall was gone. He continued working until 1945, when he was aged 73. A musical benefit was held for his support at the Winter Garden Theatre in Drury Lane in 1946. He was one of the most long standing members of the Grand Order of Water Rats, an entertainment fraternity. Kitchen died on 1 April 1951 in the Hampton Hill nursing home, Middlesex, at the age of 77, after suffering for five weeks with thrombosis. The funeral was held at West Norwood Cemetery, where his memorial is a column bearing the masks of comedy and tragedy.

Kitchen's wife, also an entertainer, known by the stage name Ella Ward, died during the Second World War. Their son Fred Kitchen Jr. also went on to work in theatre and film. Kitchen's grandson Simon Kitchen-Dunn drew together the memoirs of the Vaudeville star, published as Meredith we're in!

On 27 March 2016, Kitchen's memorial at West Norwood Cemetery was restored by The Music Hall Guild of Great Britain and America.
