= The Constant Husband =

1955 British film by Sidney Gilliat

- DVD cover based on the original UK film poster
- Directed by: Sidney Gilliat
- Written by: Sidney Gilliat; Val Valentine
- Produced by: Sidney Gilliat; Frank Launder
- Starring: Rex Harrison; Margaret Leighton; Kay Kendall; Cecil Parker; George Cole
- Cinematography: Edward Scaife
- Music by: Malcolm Arnold
- Production company: Individual Pictures Ltd
- Distributed by: British Lion Films (UK)
- Release date: 21 April 1955 (UK)
- Running time: 88 minutes
- Country: United Kingdom
- Language: English
- Box office: £162,649 (UK)

The Constant Husband is a 1955 British comedy film, directed by Sidney Gilliat and starring Rex Harrison, Margaret Leighton, Kay Kendall, Cecil Parker, George Cole and Raymond Huntley. The story was written by Gilliat together with Val Valentine, and the film was produced by Individual Pictures, Gilliat's and Frank Launder's joint production company. Because the film got caught up in the 1954 bankruptcy of British Lion Film Corporation, it was not released until more than seven months after it had been finished and reviewed by the British Board of Film Censors.

== Plot ==
A man wakes up in a hotel room in Wales, suffering from amnesia. He has no recollection of who he is, why he is there, or where he comes from. With the help of psychologist Doctor Llewellyn, they trace a wife and home in London, but they go on to discover that she is just one of seven women whom he has bigamously married. Returning to Cardiff he is arrested and a defence team formed to defend his character. His trial draws mass media attention and his former wives.

== Main cast ==
- Rex Harrison as William Egerton
- Cecil Parker as Llewellyn
- Sally Lahee as The Nurse
- Kay Kendall as Monica Hathaway
- Nicole Maurey as Lola
- Valerie French as Bridget
- Ursula Howells as Ann
- Jill Adams as Joanna Brent
- Roma Dunville as Elizabeth
- Robert Coote as Jack Carter
- Raymond Huntley as J.F. Hassett
- Noel Hood as Gladys
- Eric Pohlmann as Papa Sopranelli
- Marie Burke as Mama Sopraneli
- George Cole as Luigi Sopranelli
- Derek Sydney as Giorgio Sopranelli
- Guy Deghy as Stromboli
- Margaret Leighton as Miss Chesterman
- Eric Berry as Counsel for the Prosecution
- Michael Hordern as Judge
- Charles Lloyd-Pack as The Solicitor
- Arthur Howard as Clerk of the Court
- John Robinson as Secretary
- Michael Ripper as Left Luggage Attendant
- Muriel Young as Clara
- Sam Kydd Uncredited

== Production ==
The film was made in Shepperton Studios, with shooting finished in early June 1954, just a week after the studio's owner and the film's intended distributor, British Lion Film Corporation, went into receivership on 1 June 1954. The opening scenes were filmed on location at New Quay and Aberaeron, Ceredigion, Mid Wales, and others at Kensington, Millbank, Wormwood Scrubs, Holborn, and St. Paul's, London. When the film was screened by the censors at BBFC on 10 September 1954, it was submitted by Frank Launder's company Launder Productions, as it did not yet have a new distributor. In January 1955, Launder, Gilliat and the Boulting brothers formed a new company, British Lion Films Ltd., which took over the running of Shepperton as well as British Lion's distribution business, and the film finally received its world premiere at the London Pavilion on 21 April 1955.

Gilliat says the film was plagued by problems with the colour stock.

== Reception ==
According to the National Film Finance Corporation, the film made a comfortable profit.

According to Kinematograph Weekly it was a "money maker" at the British box office in 1955.
