= The Inch Man =

British TV detective series (1951–1952)

The Inch Man was a British television series which aired from 1951 to 1952 on the BBC. Starring Robert Ayres, it was a half-hour series broadcast live. All 14 episodes of the series are lost. It's a drama about the house detective at a hotel.

== Episode list ==
Series 1

- That Sudden Something (aired 30 June 1951)
- The Big Gamble (aired 7 July 1951)
- Midnight Blues (aired 14 July 1951)
- Wedding Night (aired 21 July 1951)
- Night Shift (aired 28 July 1951)
- Moments So Few (aired 4 August 1951)

Series 2

- Coming Out Party (aired 8 December 1951)
- Badger Game (aired 15 December 1951)
- Cocktail Hour (aired 22 December 1951)
- I Hate Christmas (aired 29 December 1951)
- Cloak and Dagger (aired 5 January 1952)
- Private View (aired 12 January 1952)
- Title Fight (aired 19 January 1952)
- The Quiet Voice (aired 26 January 1952)
