= Eugène Renduel =

French publisher (1798–1874)

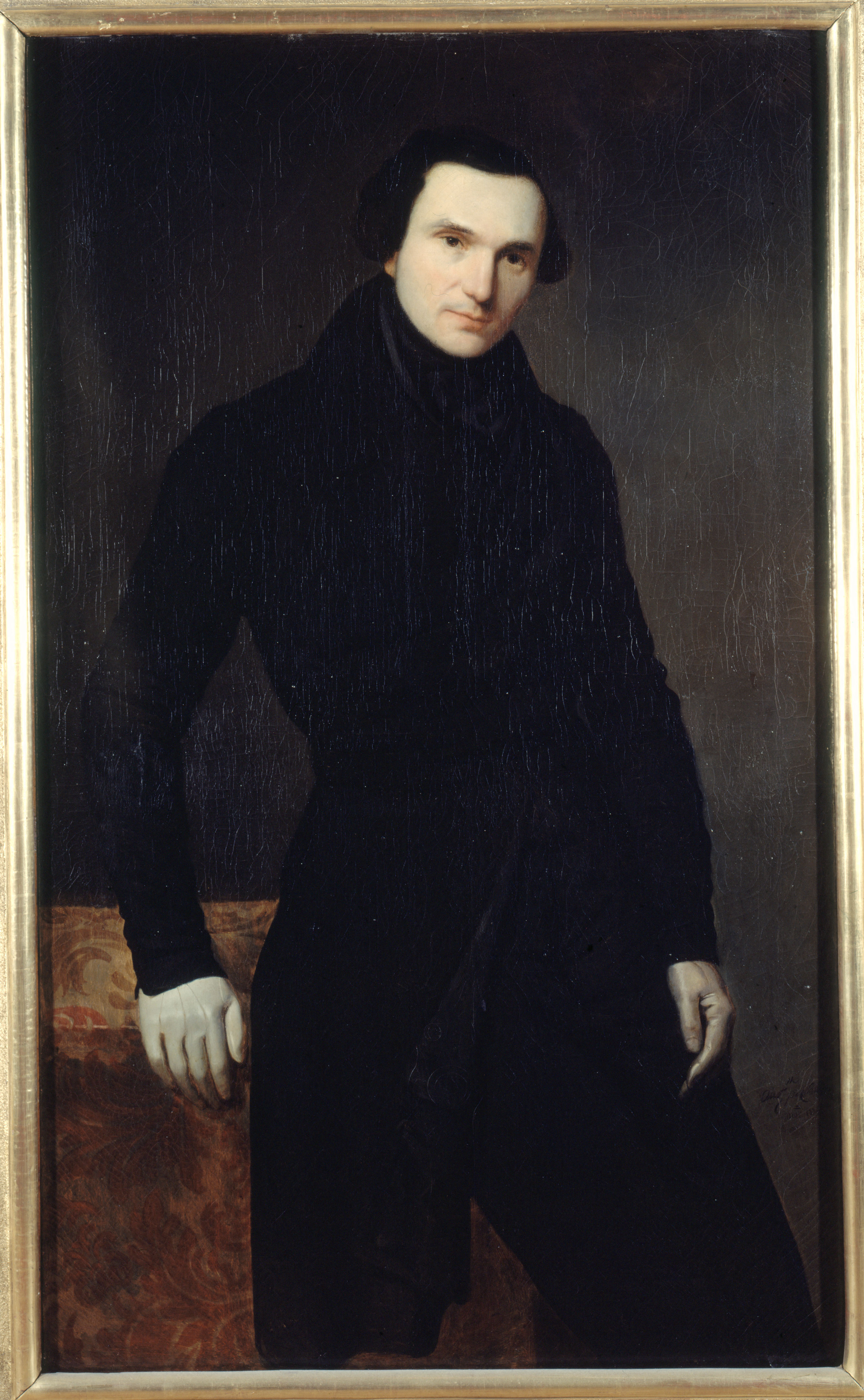
- Renduel by Auguste de Châtillon (1836)
- Born: 18 November 1798; Lormes (Nièvre)
- Died: 19 October 1874 (aged 75); Beuvron (Nièvre)
- Occupation: Publisher

Eugène Renduel (18 November 1798 – 19 October 1874) was a 19th-century French publisher.

== Career ==
After he started working as a clerk by an "avoué" in Clamecy, he moved to Paris in 1819. First an employee by a bookseller, he established his own bookshop in 1828 at 22 rue des Grands-Augustins in the modern 6th arrondissement and soon became the regular publisher of romantic writers. During the 1830s, he took part in all meetings of the new school and met the future celebrities, still beginners, mostly those of the literary world of the time. Between 1831 and 1838, he published works by Hugo, Nodier, Eugène Sue, Sainte-Beuve, Musset, Gautier, Lamennais, Pétrus Borel, etc. However, he eventually dropped the Gaspard de la nuit by Aloysius Bertrand seven years after signing the contract with the author. He knew upon the best illustrators of the time, Célestin Nanteuil, Louis Boulanger, Tony Johannot, who would provide him with engravings.

In 1838, he purchased the castle of Beuvron (Nièvre) where he retired two years later, waiving any publishing activity.

His publishing house was taken over by Louis Hachette.

== Illustrations ==
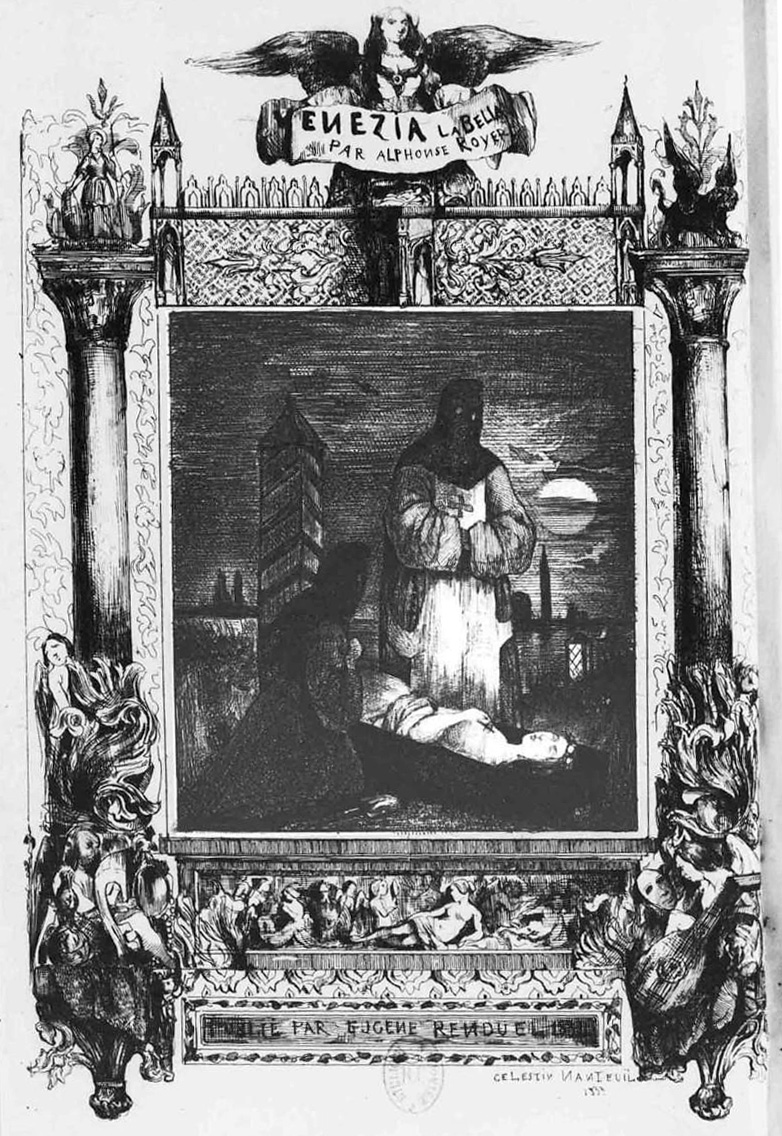
Venezia la bella by Alphonse Royer published by Renduel in 1834, illustrated by Célestin Nanteuil.

- Le Romantisme et l'éditeur Renduel on wikisource.
