= Thani Al Suwaidi =

Emirati poet and novelist (1966–2020)

- ثاني السويدي
- Born: July 1, 1966
- Died: July 5, 2020 (aged 54)
- Occupations: Poet; Novelist
- Writing career
- Genre: Prose poetry
- Notable works: The Diesel; Things Pass; Let the Sea's Spit Dry

Thani Al Suwaidi (Arabic: ثاني السويدي; 1 July 1966 – 5 July 2020) was a poet and novelist from the Emirates.

His first poetry collection belonged to the prose poem genre, titled Liyajiffa Riq al-Bahr (Let the Sea's Spit Dry), and was published by the Emirates Writers Union in 1990. Among his most important works are the novel Al-Diesel (The Diesel) and his famous poetry collection Al-Ashya' Tamur (Things Pass), which was published by Dar al-Intishar al-Arabi in Beirut.

In 2012, William Hutchins translated the novel Al-Diesel into English, the first edition of which was published in Beirut in 1994. In his introduction to it, he said that the novel is "a different literary style that carries the features of the contemporary story, written in a poetic language close to the prose poem, and it is close to direct artistic narration."
