= Le Spleen de Paris =

1869 collection of short prose poems by Charles Baudelaire

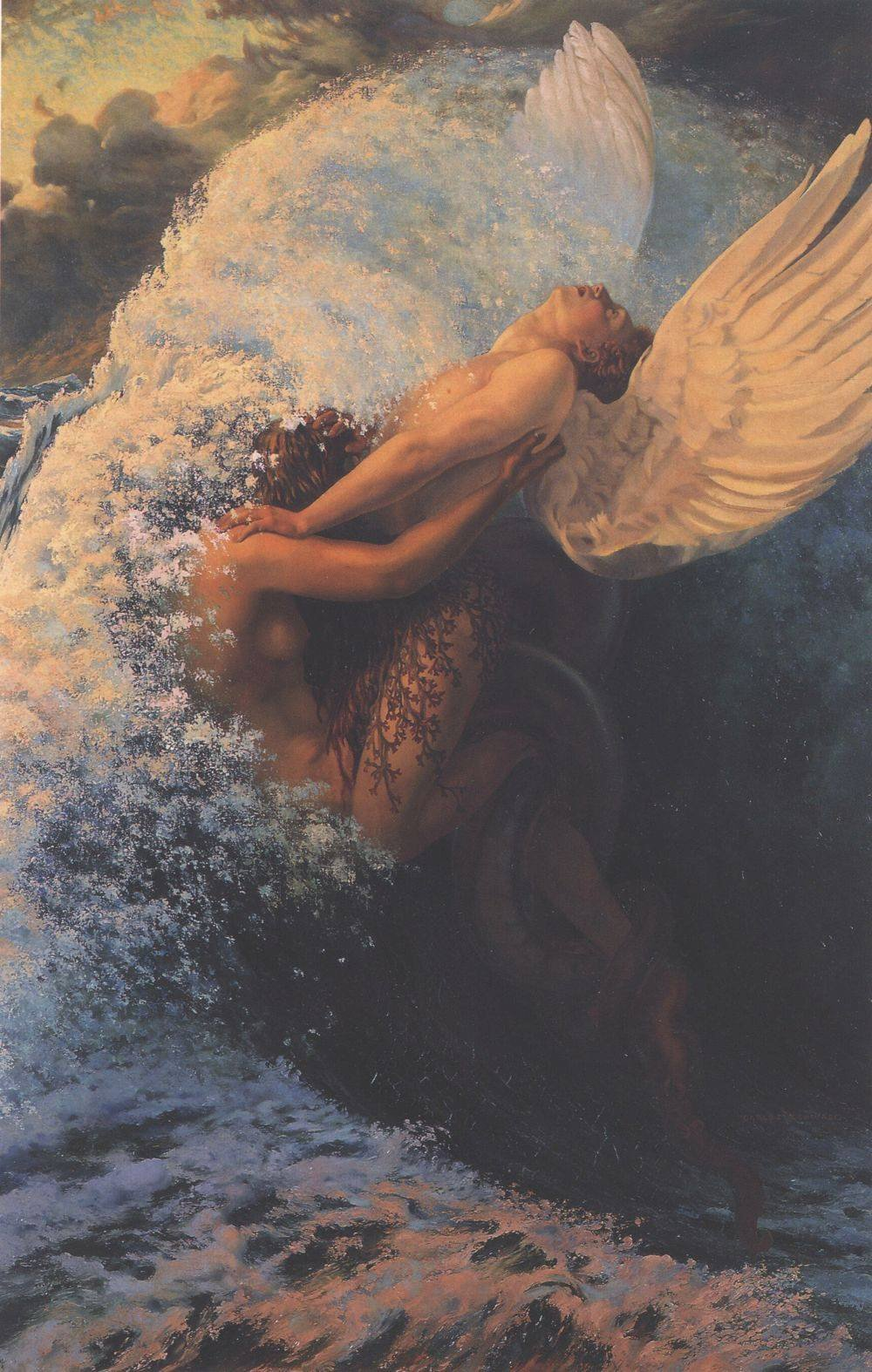
Spleen et idéal, by Carlos Schwabe, 1907

Le Spleen de Paris (Paris Spleen), also known as Petits Poèmes en prose (Little Poems in Prose), is a collection of 50 short prose poems by Charles Baudelaire. The collection was published posthumously in 1869 and is associated with literary modernism.

Baudelaire mentions he had read Aloysius Bertrand's Gaspard de la nuit (considered the first example of prose poetry) at least twenty times before starting this work. Though inspired by Bertrand, Baudelaire's prose poems were based on Parisian contemporary life instead of the medieval background which Bertrand employed. He said of his work: "These are the flowers of evil again, but with more freedom, much more detail, and much more mockery." Indeed, many of the themes and even titles from Baudelaire's earlier collection Les Fleurs du mal are revisited in this work.

These poems have no particular order, have no beginning and no end, and can be read like thoughts or short stories in a stream of consciousness style.

Published twenty years after the fratricidal June Days that ended the ideal or "brotherly" revolution of 1848, Baudelaire makes no attempts at trying to reform society he has grown up in but realizes the inequities of the progressing modernization of Paris. In poems such as "The Eyes of the Poor" where he writes (after witnessing an impoverished family looking in on a new cafe): "Not only was I moved by that family of eyes, but I felt a little ashamed of our glasses and decanters, larger than our thirst...", showing his feelings of despair and class guilt.

The title of the work refers not to the abdominal organ (the spleen) but rather to the second, more literary meaning of the word, "melancholy with no apparent cause, characterised by a disgust with everything".

== Major themes in Le Spleen de Paris ==
=== Pleasure ===
Le Spleen de Paris explores the idea of pleasure as a vehicle for expressing emotion. Many of the poems refer to sex or sin explicitly (i.e. "Double Bedroom," "A Hemisphere in a Head of Hair", "Temptations"); others use subtle language and imagery to evoke sensuality (i.e. "the Artist's Confiteor"). In both cases, the diction is undeniably sexual; for example, in "Double Bedroom", "Muslin rains abundantly over the windows and around the bed in a snowy cascade. Within this bed is ensconced the Idol, queen of dreams." Baudelaire's obsession with pleasure reflects his love for scandal and wickedness, as well as his philosophy that by seeking pleasure, man taps into his authentic "evil" self.

=== Sobriety and intoxication ===
Many of Baudelaire's prose poems, such as "Be Drunk", openly advocate drinking and intoxication. Intoxication (or any equal pleasure such as creative work, sex, virtue, etc.) creates a euphoria and timelessness that allows you to transcend the limitations of time and truly live "in the moment". In "Be Drunk", the speaker commands the reader to engage in something intoxicating: "You must be drunk always... Time crushes your shoulders and bends you earthward, you must be drunk without respite." Sobriety, in contrast, forces you to address the harsh realities of the world around you. However, this interpretation has recently been challenged by some critics, who claim that Baudelaire was actually being ironic in his advocacy for drunkenness. Maria Scott, a literary scholar, claims that Baudelaire believed "artificial toxication was... far inferior to 'successive work' and the 'regular exercise of will', that artificial stimulants... actually amplify time." Thus, it is debatable whether intoxication refers to literal drunkenness as an escape or if it symbolizes the pleasure found in writing and expressing oneself.

=== The artist/poet ===
In Le Spleen de Paris, the concept of artist and poet intermingle. Baudelaire saw poetry as a form of art, and thus in many of the prose poems the artist is a substitute for a traditional poet or speaker. In "The Desire to Paint", the artist attempts to depict his beautiful muse with images, just as the poet attempts to express his emotions with language. The relationship between the artist and poet reflects the need to evoke a particular feeling or idea, and this thread is carried through almost every single poem in the text. Ultimately, the artist and the poet become one, since they share the same purpose – to describe beauty. In this sense, the work itself (and every individual poem within) is beautiful, a "work of art" due to its innovative, interesting form. Thus, the poem, according to Baudelaire, is as much an "aesthetic experience" as it is a literary one.

=== Women ===
Women are both admired and ridiculed in Le Spleen de Paris. Some poems, such as "The Desire to Paint", reflect female power and sexuality in a somewhat positive manner. However, a larger portion of the poems in Baudelaire's work debase women as evil, gaudy, and cold. Many are represented as prostitutes, and according to scholars, "the courtesan would seem to be a virtual incarnation, for Baudelaire, of all that is artificial and misleading." In "The Rope", the speaker's apprentice hangs himself, and his mother comes to collect the rope. The speaker is shocked to discover that she did so not to "preserve them as horrible and precious relics", but to sell them for a morbid profit. Baudelaire rejects the concept of maternal love and replaces it with a cold economic reality. Still, women are inherently sexual, and in some regards, Baudelaire admires their sensual beauty (connects back to themes of intoxication, pleasure).

=== Mortality and the passage of time ===
Many of Baudelaire's prose poems are dominated by the concept of time, usually negatively. The speaker in Le Spleen de Paris fears the passage of time and his/her own mortality. As a result, intoxication, women, pleasure, and writing are all forms of escape from this unavoidable hell. "Be Drunk" and "Already!" exemplify Baudelaire's infatuation with the idea of time. In "Already!" the speaker is incapable of matching the infiniteness and simplicity of nature, and at the end, comes face to face with his own death: "I felt pulled down deathwards; which is why, when companions said, 'At last!' I could only cry, 'Already!" Also, this theme supports Baudelaire's admiration of art and poetry because although man cannot defeat time and death, a work of art can. Art, poetry, life, and death are inextricably linked within Baudelaire's poems, and perhaps reflect a personal obsession with mortality.

=== The city ===
For Baudelaire, the setting of most poems within Le Spleen de Paris is the Parisian metropolis, specifically the poorer areas within the city. Notable poems within Le Spleen de Paris whose urban setting is important include “Crowds” and “The Old Mountebank.” Within his writing about city life, Baudelaire seems to stress the relationship between individual and society, frequently placing the speaker in a reflective role looking out at the city. It is also important to note that Baudelaire's Paris is not one of nice shops and beautiful streets. Instead, Baudelaire focuses on dirty, poverty-stricken areas of Paris with social problems rather than the Paris of the upper class.

=== Poverty/class ===
In connection with the theme of the Parisian metropolis, Baudelaire focuses heavily on the theme of poverty and social class within Le Spleen de Paris. Important poems from the collection which embody these themes include "The Toy of the Poor", "The Eyes of the Poor", "Counterfeit Money", and "Let's Beat Up the Poor". In these poems Baudelaire introduces slightly differing views of the urban poor. In "The Toy of the Poor" Baudelaire heavily stresses the need for equality between social classes in Paris. In comparison, "Counterfeit Money" and "Let's Beat Up the Poor" seem to use a sarcastic tone to instil empathy in the reader for those people in poverty. In Michael Hamburger's introduction to his translation, Twenty Prose Poems of Baudelaire, the scholar notes a highly sympathetic view of the poor in Le Spleen de Paris; Baudelaire seems to relate to the poor and becomes an advocate for them in his poetry.

=== Religion/good vs. evil ===
Many poems in Le Spleen de Paris incorporate a central theme of religion or the relationship between good and evil in human nature. "Cake", which centers on a moral battle addressing the question of whether humans are inherently good or evil stands out as an especially important poem within the collection. "Loss of a Halo" also incorporates similar themes, literally discussing the role of angels as well as the relationship between mankind and religious ideology, questioning the goodness of Christian ideals. Along these lines, Baudelaire repeatedly addresses the theme of sin within his poetry as well as questioning how the hierarchy of class could affect the hierarchy of goodness, implying that those of higher social class tend not to be morally superior to those of lower classes. Many critics of Baudelaire address the prominent role of religion in the poet's life and how that might have affected his writing.

== Poet/reader relationship ==
The following passage is taken from the preface to the 2008 Mackenzie translation of Le Spleen de Paris, entitled "To Arsène Houssaye:"

My dear friend, I send you here a little work of which no one could say that it has neither head nor tail, because, on the contrary, everything in it is both head and tail, alternately and reciprocally. Please consider what fine advantages this combination offers to all of us, to you, to me, and to the reader. We can cut whatever we like—me, my reverie, you, the manuscript, and the reader, his reading; for I don't tie the impatient reader up in the endless thread of a superfluous plot. Pull out one of the vertebrae, and the two halves of this tortuous fantasy will rejoin themselves painlessly. Chop it up into numerous fragments, and you'll find that each one can live on its own. In the hopes that some of these stumps will be lively enough to please and amuse you, I dedicate the entire serpent to you.

While writing Le Spleen de Paris, Baudelaire made very conscious decisions regarding his relationship with his readers. As seen in the preface to the collection, addressed to his publisher, Arsène Houssaye, Baudelaire attempted to write a text that was very accessible to a reader while pulling the most appealing aspects of both prose and poetry and combining them into the revolutionary genre of prose poetry. For Baudelaire, the accessibility of the text and ability for a reader to set down the book and pick it up much later was crucial, especially considering his implied opinions of his readers. Baudelaire's tone throughout the preface, "The Dog and the Vial" as well as other poems throughout Le Spleen de Paris seem to illustrate Baudelaire's opinions of superiority over his readers. In "The Dog and the Vial," a man offers his dog a vial of fancy perfume to smell and the dog reacts in horror, instead wishing to sniff more seemingly unappealing smells, specifically excrement. The poem concludes with the frustration of the speaker with his dog, expressed as the speaker states: "In this respect you, unworthy companion of my sad life, resemble the public, to whom one must never present the delicate scents that only exasperate them, but instead give them only dung, chosen with care." One can extrapolate this poem to apply more figuratively to the larger themes of the poet-reader relationship, in which Baudelaire deprecates his readers, viewing them as unintelligent and incapable of appreciating his work.

== Style ==
Le Spleen de Paris represents a definitive break from traditional poetic forms. The text is composed of "prose poems" which span the continuum between "prosaic" and "poetic" works. The new, unconventional form of poetry was characteristic of the modernist movement occurring throughout Europe (and particularly in Paris) at the time. In the preface to Le Spleen de Paris, Baudelaire describes that modernity requires a new language, "a miracle of a poetic prose, musical without rhythm or rhyme, supple enough and striking enough to suit lyrical movements of the soul, undulations of reverie, the flip-flops of consciousness", and in this sense, Le Spleen de Paris gives life to modern language. Baudelaire's prose poetry tends to be more poetic in comparison to later works such as Ponge's Le parti pris des choses, but each poem varies. For an example of a more poetic poem, see "Evening Twilight;" for a prosaic example, see "The Bad Glazier."

== Publication history, influences, and critical reception ==
Baudelaire's Le Spleen de Paris is unique in that it was published posthumously by his friends in 1869, two years after Baudelaire died.Baudelaire spent years 1857 to 1867 working on his book of poems that chronicled daily life in the city of Paris. These poems aimed at capturing the times in which they were written, from the brutally repressed upheavals of 1848 (after which the government censored literature more than ever), the 1851 coup d'état of Louis Bonaparte and generally Paris of the 1850s, demolished and renovated by Napoleon III's prefect, Baron Haussmann. In displaying the social antagonisms of the age, Baudelaire drew influence from many great artists of the time. In fact, an active critical essayist himself, his critical reviews of other poets "elucidate the recesses of the mind that created Les Fleurs du Mal and Le Spleen de Paris."

Influence: While there is much speculation regarding direct influence and inspiration in the creation of Le Spleen de Paris, the following colleagues seem to have clearly influenced the book of small poems:

Edgar Allan Poe: "Indeed, Poe illustrates his claim with several examples which seem to summarize with uncanny precision the temperament of Baudelaire himself (Poe 273–4). The affinity between the two writers in this regard seems beyond dispute ... Moreover, 'The Imp of the Perverse (short story)' is less a tale than a prose poem, and both its subject-matter and its movement from general considerations to specific examples leading to an unexpected conclusion may have influenced Baudelaire in his creation of Le Spleen de Paris."

Aloysius Betrand's Gaspard de la nuit: Baudelaire himself is quoted as citing this work as an inspiration for Paris Spleen.

Gustave Flaubert: Magazine article "No ideas but in Crowds: Baudelaire's Paris Spleen" cites similarities between the writers in that like Baudelaire, Flaubert held the same motives and intentions in that he too wanted "to write the moral history of the men of my generation – or, more accurately, the history of their feelings."

Critical reception: The way in which the poem was received certainly lends to understanding the climate in which Baudelaire created Le Spleen de Paris, in that "It appears to be almost a diary entry, an explicit rundown of the day's events; those events seem to be precisely the kind that Charles Baudelaire would have experienced in the hectic and hypocritical world of the literary marketplace of his day."

Notable critical reception: In order to truly understand how Le Spleen de Paris was received, one must first be acquainted with Baudelaire's earlier works. The repressions and upheavals of 1848 resulted in massive censorship of literature, which did not bode well for Baudelaire's perhaps most famous work, Les Fleurs du Mal. Society was so shocked by the satanic references and sexual perversion in the book that at the time it was a critical and popular failure. This put the anticipated reception of Le Spleen de Paris at a disadvantage. Like Flowers of Evil, it wasn't until much later that Paris Spleen was fully appreciated for what it was, a masterpiece that "brought the style of the prose poem to the broader republics of the people". That being said, just four years after Arthur Rimbaud used Baudelaire's work as a foundation for his poems, as he considered Baudelaire a great poet and pioneer of prose.

Appearance in Media: A 2006 film Spleen, written by Eric Bomba-Ire, borrowed its title from Baudelaire's book of prose poems. Baudelaire expressed a particular feeling that he called 'Spleen' which is a mixture of melancholy, rage, eros, and resignation, which ties in well with the movie's darkly woven tale of love, betrayal and passion.

== Notable quotations ==
In "Let us beat up the poor", Baudelaire makes up a parable about economic and social equality: no one is entitled to it; it belongs to those who can win it and keep it. And he taunts the social reformer: "What do you think of that, Proudhon?"

"At One in the Morning" is like a diary entry, a rundown of the day's events. In it, Baudelaire recognizes that he is part of a society full of hypocrites. His individual self becomes "blurred ... by a hypocrisy and perverseness which progressively undermine the difference between the self and others." This is at least partly what Baudelaire meant by "a modern and more abstract life."

"The Thyrsus" is a piece addressed to composer Franz Liszt. The ancient Greek thyrsus had connotations of "unleashed sexuality and violence, of the profound power of the irrational." Baudelaire believed the thyrsus to be an acceptable object of representation for Liszt's music.

In "The Bad Windowpane Maker" Baudelaire speaks of a "kind of energy that springs from ennui and reverie" that manifests itself in a particularly unexpected way in the most inactive dreamers. Doctors and moralists alike are at a loss to explain where such mad energy so suddenly comes from to these lazy people, why they suddenly feel the need to perform such absurd and dangerous deeds.

The prefatory letter Baudelaire wrote to Arsene Houssaye, the editor of La Presse, was not necessarily intended to be included in the publication. When Baudelaire drew up his table of contents for the projected book form, he did not include the letter. It is possible, then, that the letter only appeared in La Presse as a means of flattery to ensure that Houssaye would publish the poems. Nevertheless, it allows us to understand Baudelaire's thinking about the genre of prose poetry:

Who among us has not dreamed, in his ambitious days, of the miracle of a poetic prose, musical without rhythm or rhyme, supple enough and jarring enough to be adapted to the soul's lyrical movements, the undulations of reverie, to the twists and turns that consciousness takes?

== Translations into English ==
- Poems in Prose from Charles Baudelaire, partial trans. Arthur Symons (Mathews, 1905)
- Little Poems in Prose, trans. Aleister Crowley (Titus, 1928)
- Twenty Prose Poems of Baudelaire, trans. Michael Hamburger (Poetry London, 1946; revised in 1968)
- Paris Spleen, trans. Louise Varèse (New Directions, 1947)
- Short Poems in Prose, partial trans. Norman Cameron in My Heart Laid Bare and Other Prose Writing (1950)
- City Blues, partial trans. F.W.J. Hemmings (1977)
- The Parisian Prowler, trans. Edward K. Kaplan (University of Georgia Press, 1989)
- The Poems in Prose and La Fanfarlo, trans. Francis Scarfe (Anvil Press, 1989)
- The Prose Poems and La Fanfarlo, trans. Rosemary Lloyd (Oxford University Press, 1991)
- 14 selected poems, various translators, in Baudelaire in English (Penguin, 1997)
- Paris Spleen and La Fanfarlo, trans. Raymond N. Mackenzie (Hackett, 2008)
- Paris Spleen: Little Poems in Prose, trans. Keith Waldrop (Wesleyan University Press, 2009)
- Paris Spleen, trans. Rainer J. Hanshe (Contra Mundum Press, 2021)
- Paris Spleen, trans. Martin Sorrell (Alma Books, 2023)

== Table of contents (Mackenzie 2008) ==
To Arsène Houssaye

1. The Foreigner
2. The Old Woman's Despair
3. The Artist's Confession
4. A Joker
5. The Double Room
6. To Each His Chimera
7. The Fool and Venus
8. The Dog and the Vial
9. The Bad Glazier
10. At One in the Morning
11. The Wild Woman and the Little Mistress
12. Crowds
13. The Widows
14. The Old Mountebank
15. Cake
16. The Clock
17. A Hemisphere in Her Hair
18. Invitation to the Voyage
19. The Toy of the Poor
20. The Fairies' Gifts
21. The Temptations: Or, Eros, Plutus, and Fame
22. Evening Twilight
23. Solitude
24. Plans
25. Beautiful Dorothy
26. The Eyes of the Poor
27. A Heroic Death
28. Counterfeit Money
29. The Generous Gambler
30. The Rope
31. Vocations
32. The Thyrsus
33. Get Yourself Drunk
34. Already!
35. Windows
36. The Desire to Paint
37. The Favors of the Moon
38. Which is the Real One?
39. A Thoroughbred
40. The Mirror
41. The Port
42. Portraits of Mistresses
43. The Gallant Marksman
44. The Soup and the Clouds
45. The Firing Range and the Graveyard
46. Loss of a Halo
47. Mademoiselle Bistouri
48. Any Where Out of the World
49. Let's Beat Up the Poor!
50. Good Dogs

== See also ==
- Melancholia
- Spleen#Society and culture
