= Louis Boulanger =

French artist

Louis Candide Boulanger
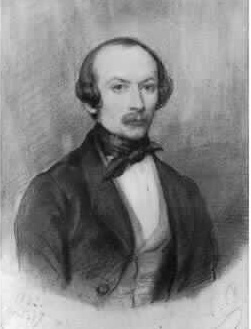
- Born: 11 March 1806; Vercelli, Italy
- Died: 5 March 1867 (aged 60); Dijon, France
- Education: École nationale supérieure des beaux-arts
- Known for: Paintings, lithographies, illustrations, scenography, poetry.

Louis Candide Boulanger (1806 – 1867) was a French Romantic painter, pastellist, lithographer and a poet, known for his religious and allegorical subjects, portraits, genre scenes.

== Life ==
Boulanger was born in Piedmont where his father, François-Louis Boulanger, Lieutenant colonel of the Napoleon Army met his mother, Marie-Magdeleine-Gertrude Archibbuggi.

In 1821 he joined the École des Beaux-Arts where he received classical training in the style of Jacques-Louis David from Guillaume Guillon Lethière and befriended Achille Devéria. He decided to become a painter "under the influence of the chiefs of the romantic school". (Note: Michael Bryan: "Dictionary of Painters and Engravers, biographical and critical", London: George Bell and sons, 4, York st, Covent Garden, 1886, p. 168.)

In 1824 he was amongst the finalists of the Prix de Rome and met his life-long friend writer Victor Hugo.

In 1827 Boulanger and his family moved to a rented flat at 11 Rue Notre-Dame-des-Champs.

In 1840 he was awarded the Legion of Honor.

In 1856 he married 27-year-old Adélaïde Catherine Amélie Lemonnier-Delafosse (1829-after 1900) and the couple had two sons.

In 1860 he was appointed director of the École Impériale des Beaux-Arts de Dijon, now the École nationale supérieure d'art de Dijon. He died here in 1867 and is buried in Paris.

On his death, Victor Hugo wrote to Madame Boulanger: “I owe Louis Boulanger my best memories. His youth and mine were intertwined. Even as a teenager myself I noticed how talented he was."

== Career ==
Among his notable friends were Victor Hugo, history painter Eugène Devéria, writer Honoré de Balzac, poet Aloysius Bertrand, literary critic Charles Augustin Sainte-Beuve, novelist Alexandre Dumas fils, architect Charles Robelin, writer Alfred de Musset, sculptor David d'Angers, painter Nicolas Toussaint Charlet, and writer Prosper Mérimée.

In 1827 he and Devéria illustrated "Souvenirs du Théâtre Anglais à Paris" by Charles-François-Jean-Baptiste Moreau de Commagny. This year he obtained the second-class medal from the École des Beaux-Arts, followed by the first-class medal in 1836 and the cross in 1840.

In 1829 he went to Germany and in 1831 England, with Sainte-Beuve and Robelin, to visit museums and churches. He kept journals of his travels. (Note: Charles Guillot published his journals around 1900.)

He illustrated several Romantic works of Alexandre Dumas, "Les Orientales" (1827) and seven editions of "The Hunchback of Notre-Dame" (1836) by Victor Hugo, and "Souvenirs du théâtre anglais à Paris" by Moreau de Commagny. Both Hugo and Boulanger were passionate about knights, dragons and medieval mobsters.

Boulanger created stage costumes for some of Victor Hugo's theater plays, such as "Hernani" in 1829, "Ruy Blas" in 1838, and "Les Burgraves", in 1843.

From 1835 his style shifted from romanticism and focused on more detailed design, turning to classical literature for inspiration. He produced most of his portraits during this time.

In 1846 he travelled to Spain with Dumas, Giraud and Maquet. After visiting Toledo, Aranjuez, Jaen and Granada, they arrived to Madrid to visit the Prado Museum, where Boulanger was particularly struck by Goya, Velázquez, Titian, Rubens and Salvator Rosa. After this trip his style shifted again to explore more romantic techniques.

In 1850 Boulanger painted the chapel of the Souls of Purgatory at Saint-Roch and a “Torment of St-Laurent” in the transept chapel of Saint-Laurent church in Paris. He also provided mural paintings for the frieze of the Palace of Versailles, the Senate chamber at the Luxembourg Palace, and the Palace de Saint-Cloud.

== Legacy ==
Louis Boulanger took an active role in the Romantic Movement and painted the portraits of several personalities such as writer George Sand, Victor Hugo, Adèle Foucher, writer Petrus Borel and many others.

His paintings show the influence of French painter Antoine-Jean Gros, French painter and writer Eugène Fromentin, English painter John Constable, and later in life by Spanish painter Francisco Goya.

Although his creations may be criticised for their ‘literary’ inspiration (in particular “La Ronde du Sabbat”, and “Petrarch’s Triumph”), his pastel sky studies prefigure Paul Huet and Eugène Boudin.

His works can be found in French collections, including the Louvre, Maison de Victor Hugo, and Musée des beaux-arts de Tours.

His son Louis René Boulanger (1860-1917) also became a painter.

== Notable works ==
- "Supplice de Mazeppa", 1827, his first hit at the Salon, Musée des Beaux-Arts de Rouen
- "The Ronde du Sabbat", 1828
- "La Feu du Ciel", c. 1828, Maison de Victor Hugo, Paris, lithographed in 1831
- "Les Fantômes", 1829
- "King Leaving for the Town Hall", 1831
- "La mort de Bailly", 1831, rejected by the Paris Salon of 1831.
- "Assassination of the Duke of Orléans", 1833, Musée des beaux-arts de Troyes
- "Petrarch’s Triumph", 1836 (Note: Commissioned by the Marquis Astolphe de Custine for the living room of his hotel on rue de La Rochefoucault, Paris. The original painting changed hands often and in the end went missing. The cardboard design was given by Boulanger to his friend the architect Charles Robelin, it remained with the latter's family until it entered the Musée des Beaux-Arts de Dijon by M. Ratbert Guillemot.)
- "Portrait of Honoré de Balzac", c. 1837
- "Trois amours poétiques: Béatrix, Laure, Orsolina", c. 1840, Musée des Augustins, Toulouse
- "Notre-Dame de Pitié", 1844
- "Dante's inferno", 1850
- "St Jerome and the Roman Fugitives", 1855
- "Adélaïde Boulanger, née Lemoinier-Delafosse (1829-after 1900), wife of the artist", 1858, Louvre.
- "Virgil’s Georgics", 1864
- "Shoe-lace Seller", 1864
- "Vive la joie", 1866, Musée des Beaux-Arts de Dijon.

== Gallery ==
Paintings by Louis Boulanger

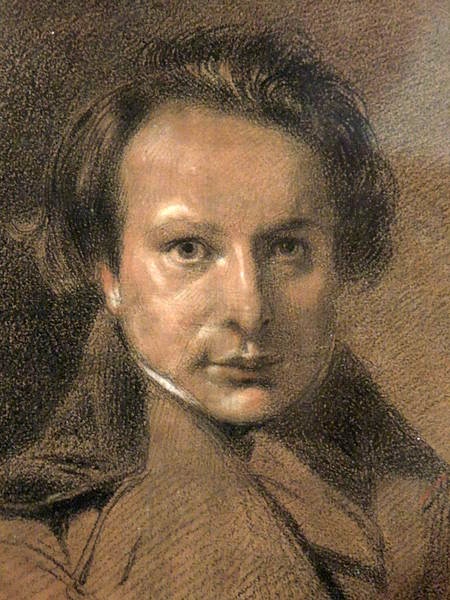
Portrait of Victor Hugo (1802-1885), 1837, Polish Library in Paris

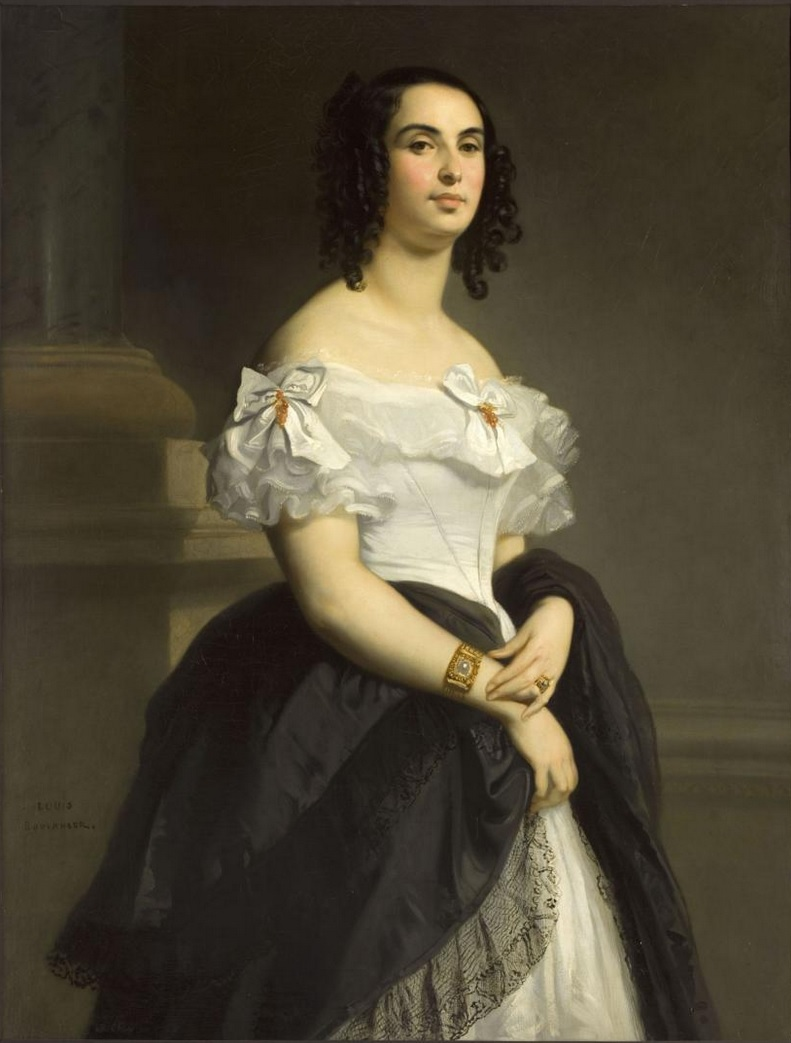
Portrait of Adèle Foucher (1803-1868), 1839, Maison de Victor Hugo.

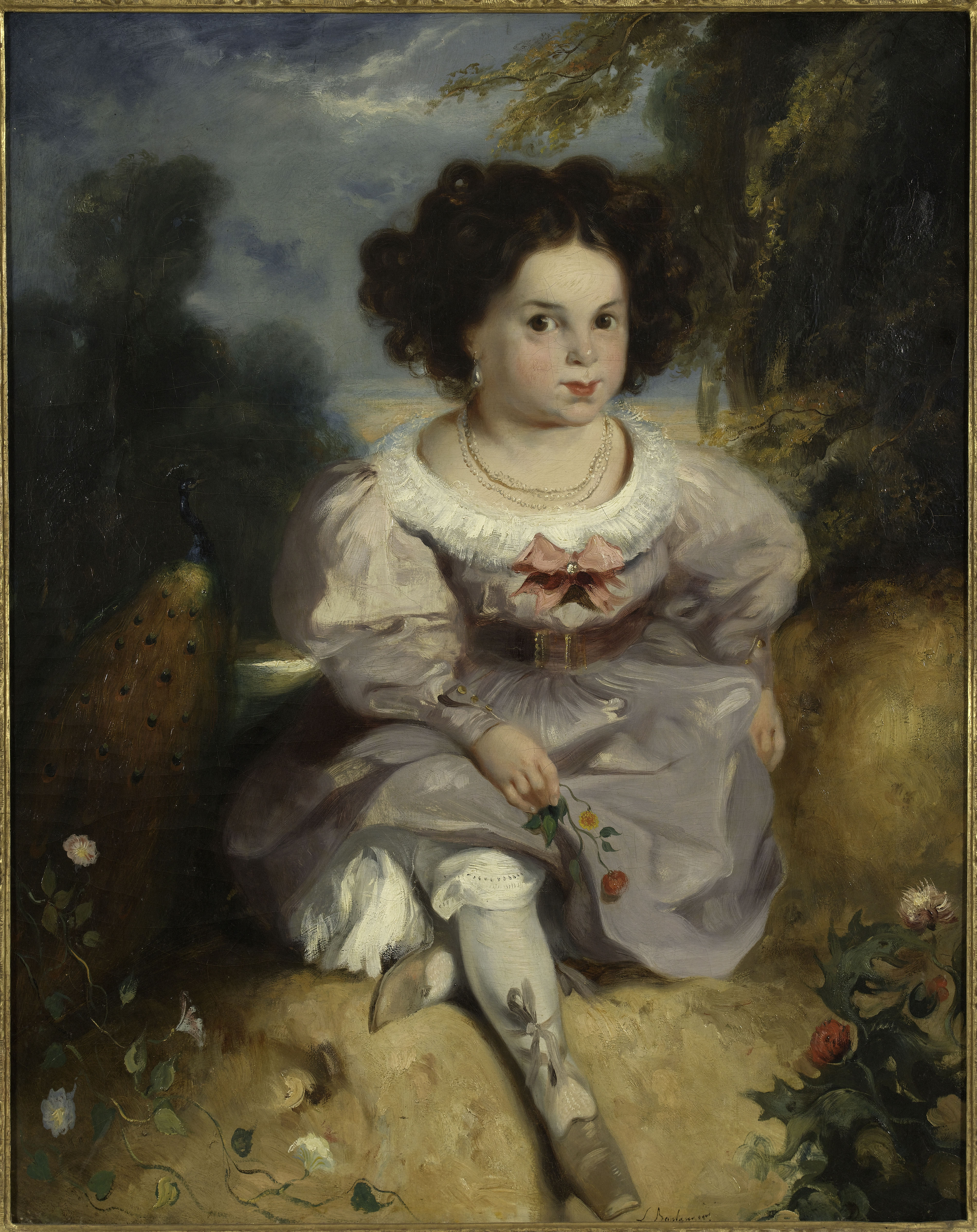
Léopoldine Hugo aged four (1824-1843), 1827, Maison de Victor Hugo.

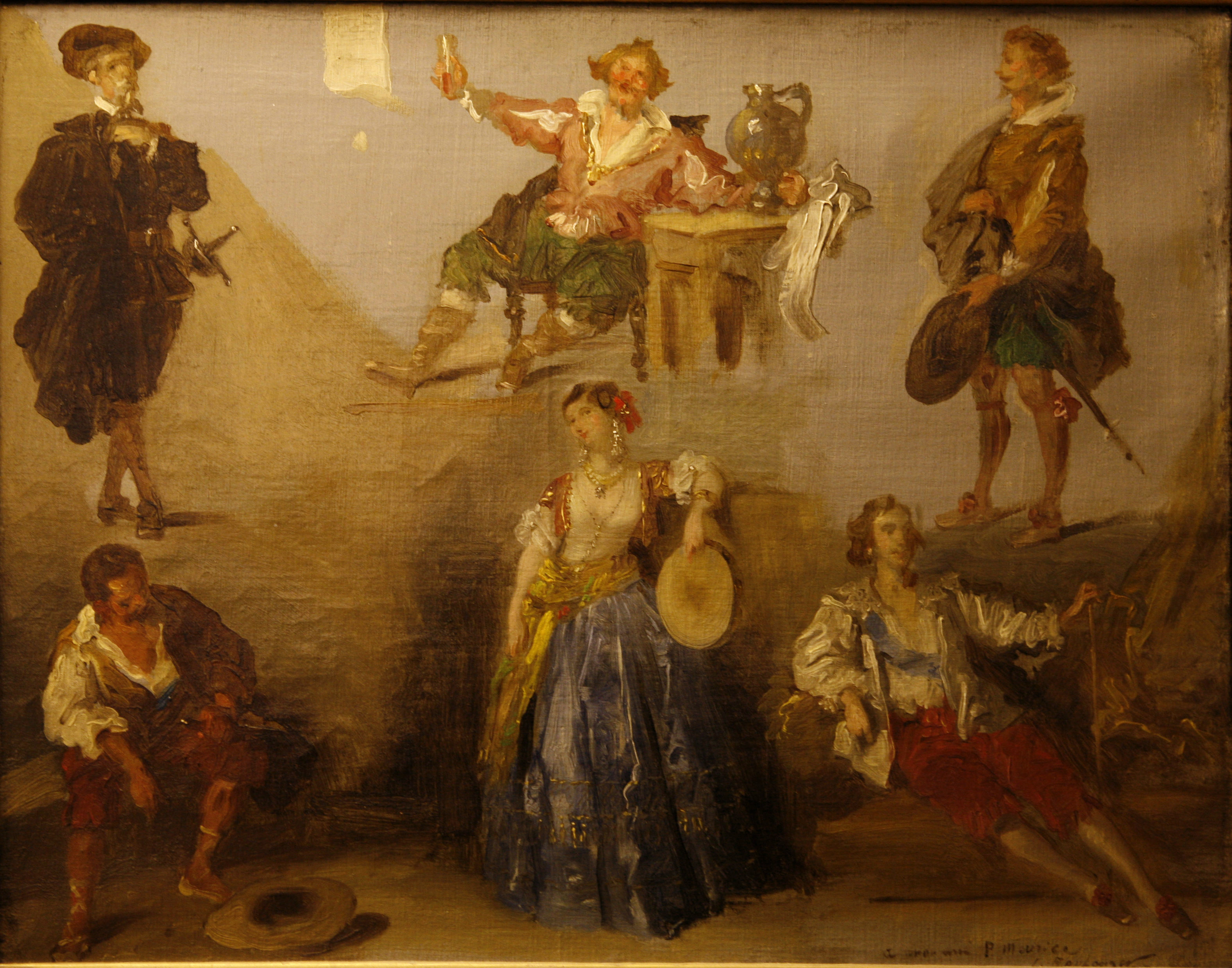
Six characters of Victor Hugo

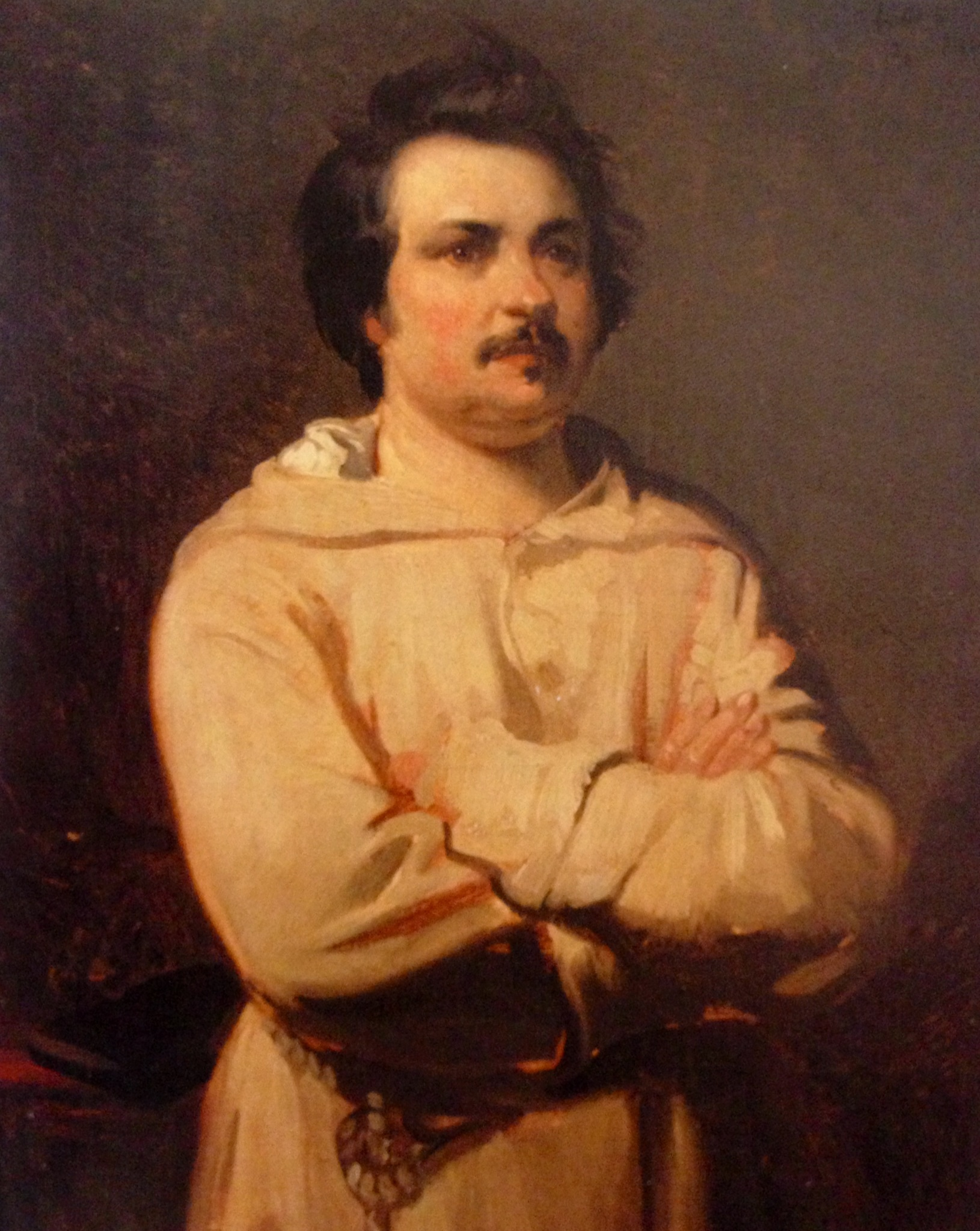
Portrait of Honoré de Balzac (1799-1850), Musée des Beaux-Arts de Tours.

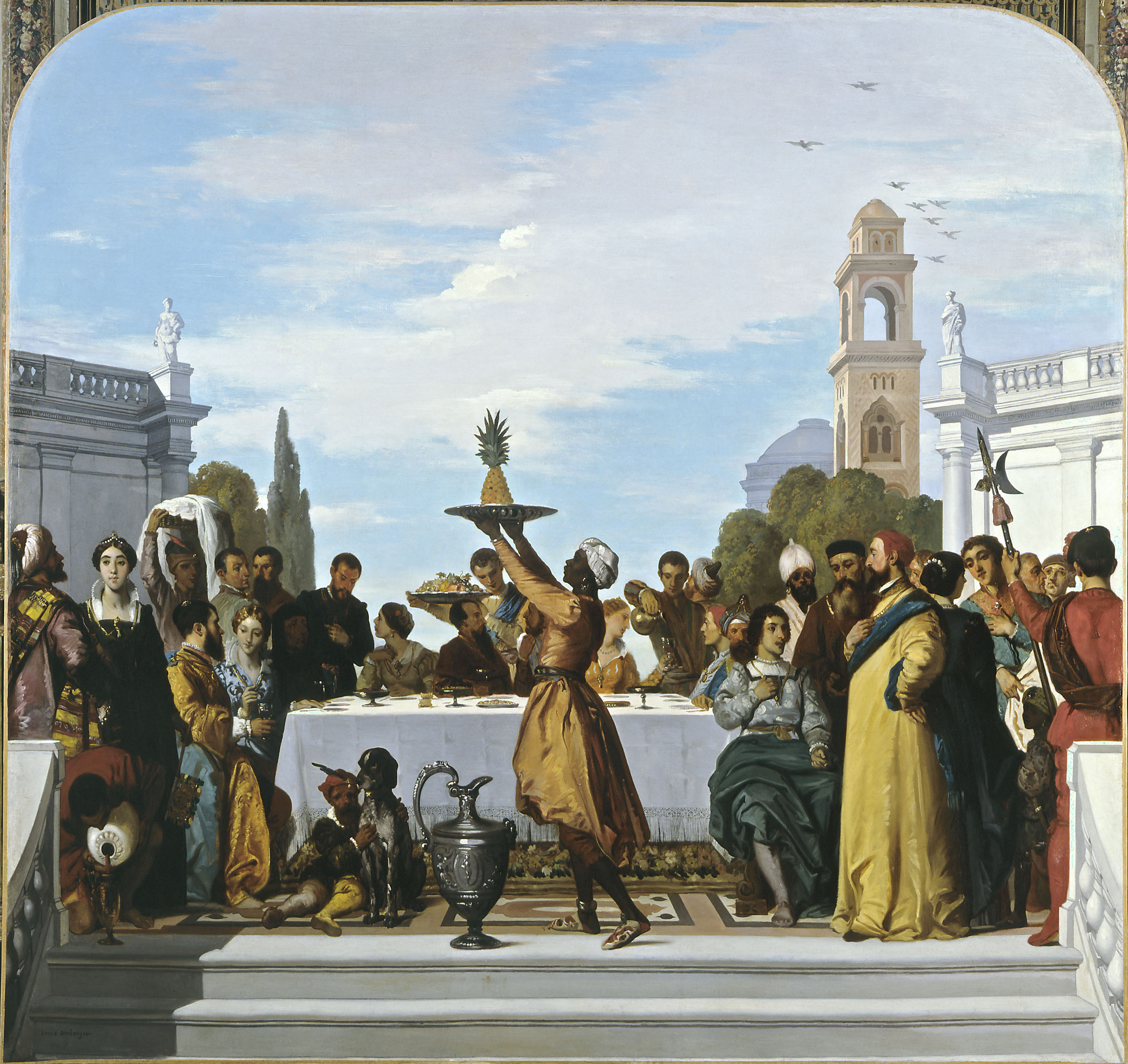
Dining room mural for the hôtel Mahler, 1846 - 1851, Musée Carnavalet.

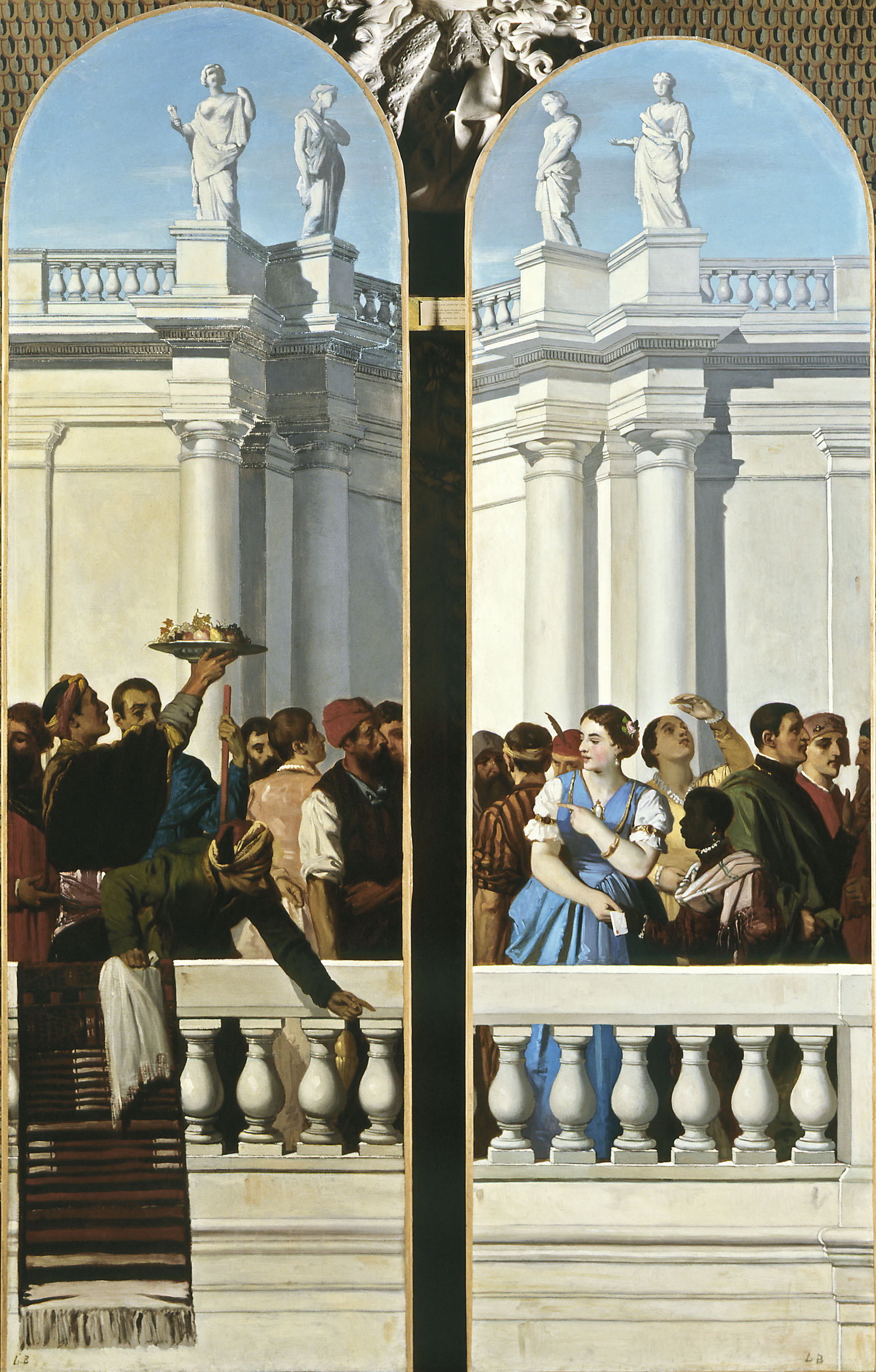
Dining room mural for the Hôtel Mahler, (1846-1851), Musée Carnavalet.

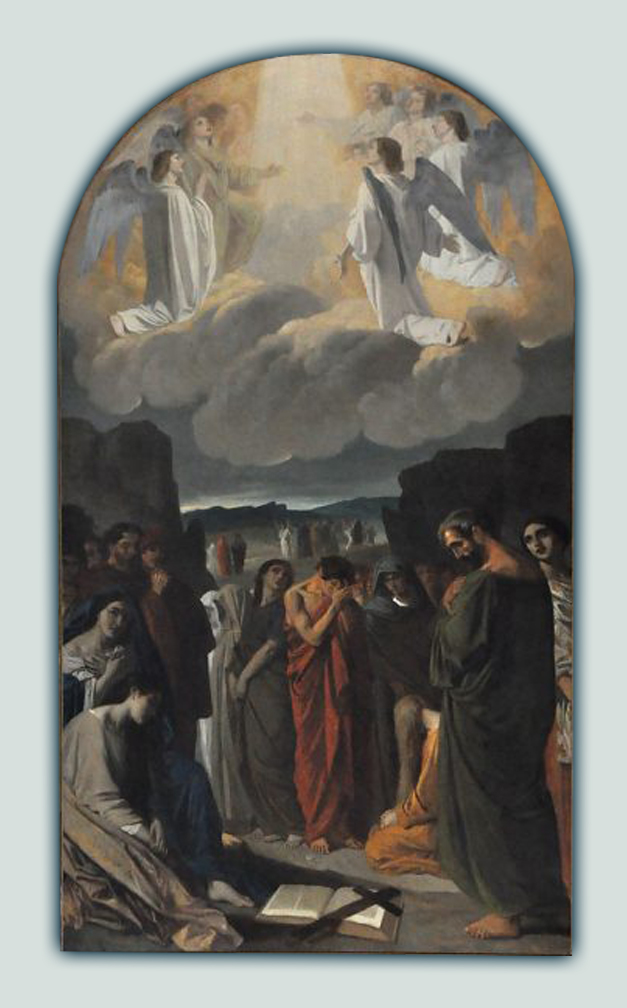
Souls in Purgatory, 1850, Saint-Roch, Paris.

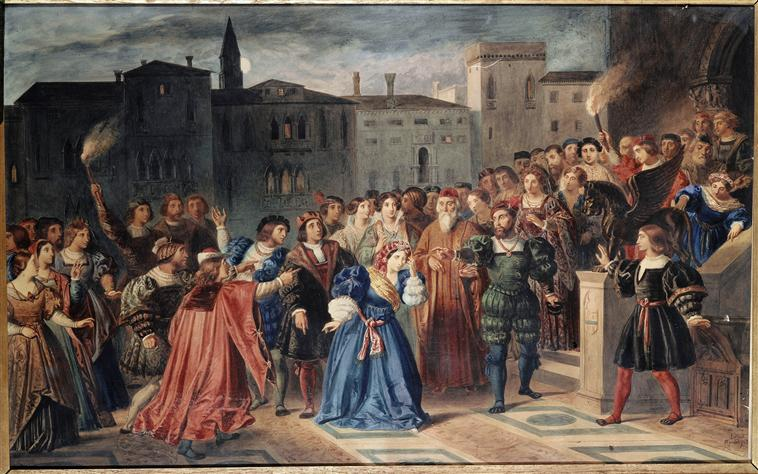
Lucrezia Borgia, act I, scene V, Maison de Victor Hugo.

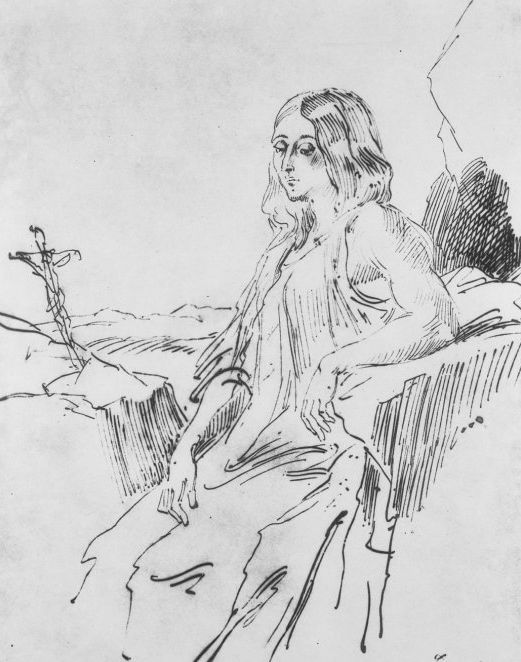
George Sand as Mary Magdalene in the desert

== Sources ==
- Michael Bryan: "Dictionary of Painters and Engravers, biographical and critical", London: George Bell & Sons, 4, York st, Covent Garden, 1886, p. 168.
- Théophile Gautier, "Histoire du romantisme", Georges Charpentier, Paris, 1874.
- Aristide Marie (1862-1938), "Le Peintre poète Louis Boulanger", H. Floury, coll. "La Vie et l'art romantiques", Paris, 1925.
- Benezit Dictionary of Artists, Éditions Gründ, 2006.
