= Le Désir de peindre =

1869 prose poem by Charles Baudelaire

"Le Désir de peindre" ("The Desire to Paint") is a prose poem written by Charles Baudelaire. It is the thirty-sixth poem of the collection Le Spleen de Paris (1869).
