= Champavert =

1833 short story collection by Pétrus Borel

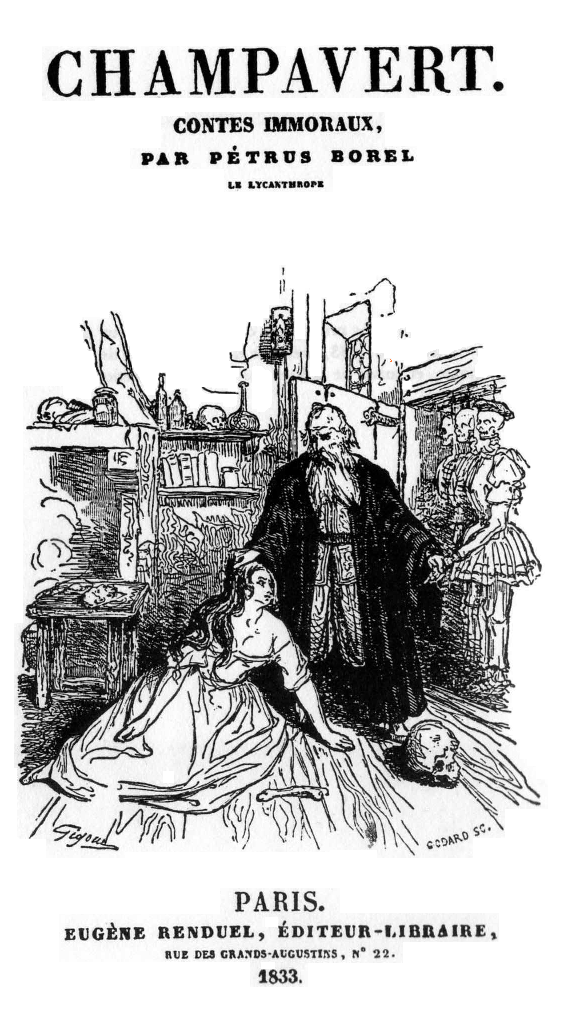
- Author: Pétrus Borel
- Language: French
- Publisher: Eugène Renduel
- Publication date: February 1833
- Publication place: France
- English publication date: 1959
- Pages: 438

Champavert: Immoral Tales (French: Champavert. Contes immoraux) is a short story collection by the French writer Pétrus Borel, published in February 1833 by Eugène Renduel. It consists of seven stories set in Havana, Jamaica, Lyon, Madrid and Paris, each concerning the dismembering of human bodies, calculated cruelty and sexual violence against women.

Champavert was a common surname in Borel's home city of Lyon and the subtitle is an ironic nod to the "moral tales" (French: contes moreax) of Jean-François Marmontel, which were popular at the time.

The book was published in an English translation by Tom Moran in 1959 as Champavert: Seven Bitter Tales. A new translation by Brian Stableford was published in 2013 as Champavert: Immoral Tales.

== Contents ==
- "A Biographical Sketch of Champavert" (Notice sur Champavert)
- "Monsieur de l'Argentière, the Prosecutor" (Monsieur de l'Argentière, l'accusateur)
- "Jaquez Barraou, the Carpenter" (Jaquez Barraou, le charpentier)
- "Don Andrea Vesalius, the Anatomist" (Don Andréa Vésalius, l'anatomiste)
- "Three-fingered Jack, the Obi" (Three Fingered Jack, l'obi)
- "Dinah, the Beautiful Jewess" (Dina, la belle juive)
- "Passereau, the Student" (Passereau, l'écolier)
- "Champavert, the Lycanthrope" (Champavert, le lycanthrope)

== See also ==
- Conte cruel
