= Gaspard de la nuit =

Piano suite by Maurice Ravel

- Trois poèmes pour piano d'après Aloysius Bertrand
- Suite by Maurice Ravel
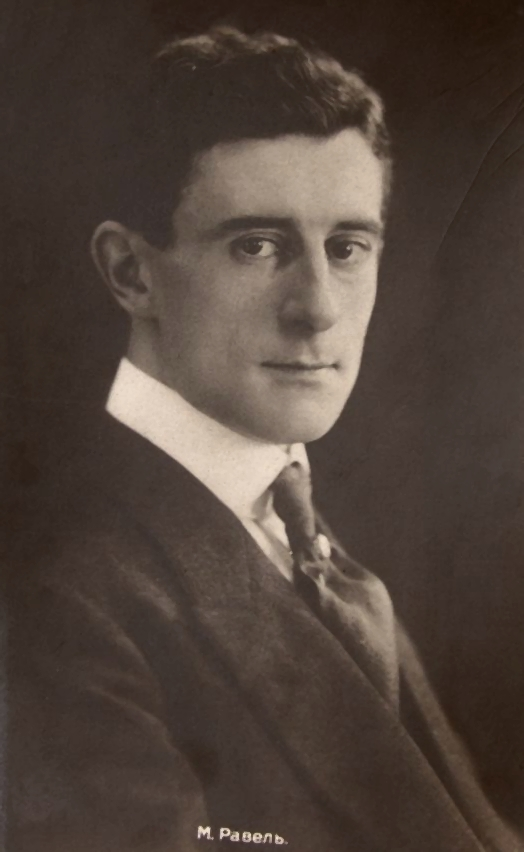
- Ravel in 1910
- Catalogue: M. 55
- Based on: Aloysius Bertrand's Gaspard de la Nuit
- Composed: 1908
- Duration: about 22 minutes
- Movements: Three
- Scoring: Solo piano

Premiere
- Date: 9 January 1909
- Location: Paris
- Performers: Ricardo Viñes

Gaspard de la nuit (subtitled Trois poèmes pour piano d'après Aloysius Bertrand), M. 55 is a suite of piano pieces by Maurice Ravel, written in 1908. It has three movements, each based on a poem or fantaisie from the collection Gaspard de la Nuit – Fantaisies à la manière de Rembrandt et de Callot completed in 1836 by Aloysius Bertrand. The work was premiered in Paris, on January 9, 1909, by Ricardo Viñes. Ravel dedicated the piece to pianist Harold Bauer, Jean Marnold and Rudolph Ganz.

The piece is famous for its difficulty, partly because Ravel intended the Scarbo movement to be more difficult than Balakirev's Islamey. Because of its technical challenges and profound musical structure, Scarbo is considered one of the most difficult solo piano pieces in the standard repertoire.

The manuscript currently resides in the Harry Ransom Center of the University of Texas at Austin.

== Etymology ==
The name "Gaspard" is derived from its original Persian form, denoting "the man in charge of the royal treasures": "Gaspard of the Night" or the treasurer of the night thus creates allusions to someone in charge of all that is jewel-like, dark, mysterious, perhaps even morose.

Of the work, Ravel himself said: "Gaspard has been a devil in coming, but that is only logical since it was he who is the author of the poems. My ambition is to say with notes what a poet expresses with words."

Aloysius Bertrand, author of Gaspard de la Nuit (1842), introduces his collection by attributing them to a mysterious old man met in a park in Dijon, who lent him the book. When he goes in search of M. Gaspard to return the volume, he asks, " 'Tell me where M. Gaspard de la Nuit may be found.' 'He is in hell, provided that he isn't somewhere else', comes the reply. 'Ah! I am beginning to understand! What! Gaspard de la Nuit must be...?' the poet continues. 'Ah! Yes... the devil!' his informant responds. 'Thank you, mon brave!... If Gaspard de la Nuit is in hell, may he roast there. I shall publish his book.'"

== Structure ==
=== I. Ondine ===
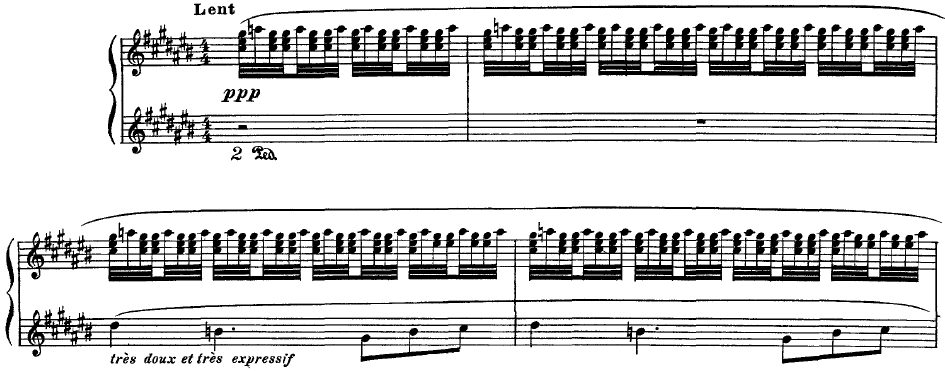
Opening of Ondine

I. Ondine
Performed by Giorgi Latso

Written in C♯ major and based on the poem "Ondine", an oneiric tale of the water nymph Undine singing to seduce the observer into visiting her kingdom deep at the bottom of a lake. It is reminiscent of Ravel's early piano piece, the Jeux d'eau (1901), with the sounds of water falling and flowing, woven with cascades. The work is in sonata form "by stealth".

There are five main melodies. The opening melody at bar 2 evokes a line of song and is similar in form and subject to the main theme in Sirènes from Claude Debussy's Nocturnes. This is interrupted by the second theme at bar 10 before opening up a longer melodic passage formed from the latter part of theme 1. Then a short simple melody first heard at bar 23 introduces shimmering harmonic side-shifting. The final distinct melody is a menacing short rising figure first heard at bar 45, which prefaces the menace of Le Gibet and which later provides a bridge to the main climax at bar 66. Ravel prioritises melodic development to express the poetic themes, keeping subordinate the simmering coloration of the right hand. By contrast, Claude Debussy's works such as Reflets dans l'eau tend to treat melody more equally with harmonic and figurative impulsivity, and often position virtuosity more in the foreground.

This piece contains technical challenges for the right hand such as the fast repetition of three-note chords in the opening accompaniment, the double note passages beginning at bar 57, and the disjunct climactic movement of the hands beginning at bar 66.

A recording of Ondine lasts around 6 minutes and 30 seconds.

Ondine

. . . . . . . . Je croyais entendre
Une vague harmonie enchanter mon sommeil,
Et près de moi s'épandre un murmure pareil
Aux chants entrecoupés d'une voix triste et tendre.
Ch. Brugnot. – Les deux Génies

. . . . . . . . I thought I heard
A faint harmony that enchants my sleep.
And close to me radiates an identical murmur
Of songs interrupted by a sad and tender voice.
Ch. Brugnot – The Two Spirits

» Écoute! – Écoute! – C'est moi, c'est Ondine qui frôle de ces gouttes d'eau les losanges sonores de ta fenêtre illuminée par les mornes rayons de la lune; et voici, en robe de moire, la dame châtelaine qui contemple à son balcon la belle nuit étoilée et le beau lac endormi.
"Listen! – Listen! – It is I, it is Ondine who brushes drops of water on the resonant panes of your windows lit by the gloomy rays of the moon; and here in gown of watered silk, the mistress of the chateau gazes from her balcony on the beautiful starry night and the beautiful sleeping lake.
» Chaque flot est un ondin qui nage dans le courant, chaque courant est un sentier qui serpente vers mon palais, et mon palais est bâti fluide, au fond du lac, dans le triangle du feu, de la terre et de l'air.
"Each wave is a water sprite who swims in the stream, each stream is a footpath that winds towards my palace, and my palace is a fluid structure, at the bottom of the lake, in a triangle of fire, of earth and of air.
» Écoute! – Écoute! – Mon père bat l'eau coassante d'une branche d'aulne verte, et mes sœurs caressent de leurs bras d'écume les fraîches îles d'herbes, de nénuphars et de glaîeuls, ou se moquent du saule caduc et barbu qui pêche à la ligne. »
"Listen! – Listen! – My father whips the croaking water with a branch of a green alder tree, and my sisters caress with their arms of foam the cool islands of herbs, of water lilies, and of corn flowers, or laugh at the decrepit and bearded willow who fishes at the line."
Sa chanson murmurée, elle me supplia de recevoir son anneau à mon doigt, pour être l'époux d'une Ondine, et de visiter avec elle son palais, pour être le roi des lacs.
Her song murmured, she beseeched me to accept her ring on my finger, to be the husband of an Ondine, and to visit her in her palace and be king of the lakes.
Et comme je lui répondais que j'aimais une mortelle, boudeuse et dépitée, elle pleura quelques larmes, poussa un éclat de rire, et s'évanouit en giboulées qui ruisselèrent blanches le long de mes vitraux bleus.
And as I was replying to her that I loved a mortal, sullen and spiteful, she wept some tears, uttered a burst of laughter, and vanished in a shower that streamed white down the length of my blue stained glass windows.

=== II. Le Gibet ===
II. Le gibet
MIDI realization

Written in E♭ minor and based on the poem of the same name, the movement presents the observer with a view of the desert, where the lone corpse of a hanged man on a gibbet stands out against the horizon, reddened by the setting sun. Meanwhile, a bell tolls from inside the walls of a far-off city, creating the deathly atmosphere that surrounds the observer. Throughout the piece is a B♭ octave ostinato, imitating the tolling bell pattern in the Funeral March of Chopin's second piano sonata. It remains constant in tone as the notes cross over and the dynamics change. A recording of "Le Gibet" lasts around 6 minutes.

Le Gibet

Que vois-je remuer autour de ce Gibet?
– Faust.

What do I see stirring around that gibbet?
– Faust.

Ah! ce que j'entends, serait-ce la bise nocturne qui glapit, ou le pendu qui pousse un soupir sur la fourche patibulaire?
Ah! that which I hear, was it the north wind that screeches in the night, or the hanged one who utters a sigh on the forked gallows?
Serait-ce quelque grillon qui chante tapi dans la mousse et le lierre stérile dont par pitié se chausse le bois?
Was it some cricket who sings lurking in the moss and the sterile ivy, which out of pity covers the floor of the forest?
Serait-ce quelque mouche en chasse sonnant du cor autour de ces oreilles sourdes à la fanfare des hallali?
Was it some fly in chase sounding the horn around those ears deaf to the fanfare of the halloos?
Serait-ce quelque escarbot qui cueille en son vol inégal un cheveu sanglant à son crâne chauve?
Was it some scarab beetle who gathers in his uneven flight a bloody hair from his bald skull?
Ou bien serait-ce quelque araignée qui brode une demi-aune de mousseline pour cravate à ce col étranglé?
Or then, was it some spider who embroiders a half-measure of muslin for a tie on this strangled neck?
C'est la cloche qui tinte aux murs d'une ville sous l'horizon, et la carcasse d'un pendu que rougit le soleil couchant.
It is the bell that tolls from the walls of a city, under the horizon, and the corpse of the hanged one that is reddened by the setting sun.

=== III. Scarbo ===
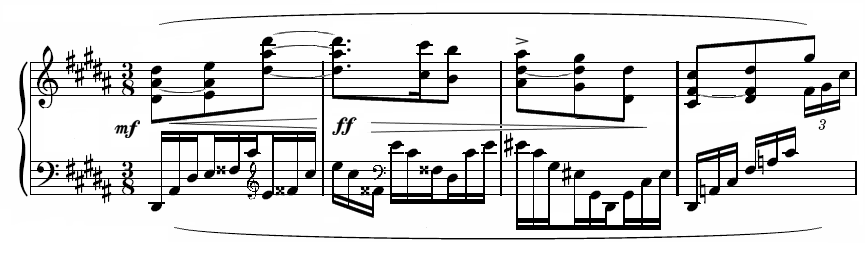
Bars 110–113 from Scarbo

I wanted to make a caricature of romanticism. Perhaps it got the better of me.

— Maurice Ravel, on "Scarbo".

III. Scarbo
Performed by Andriy Makarevych

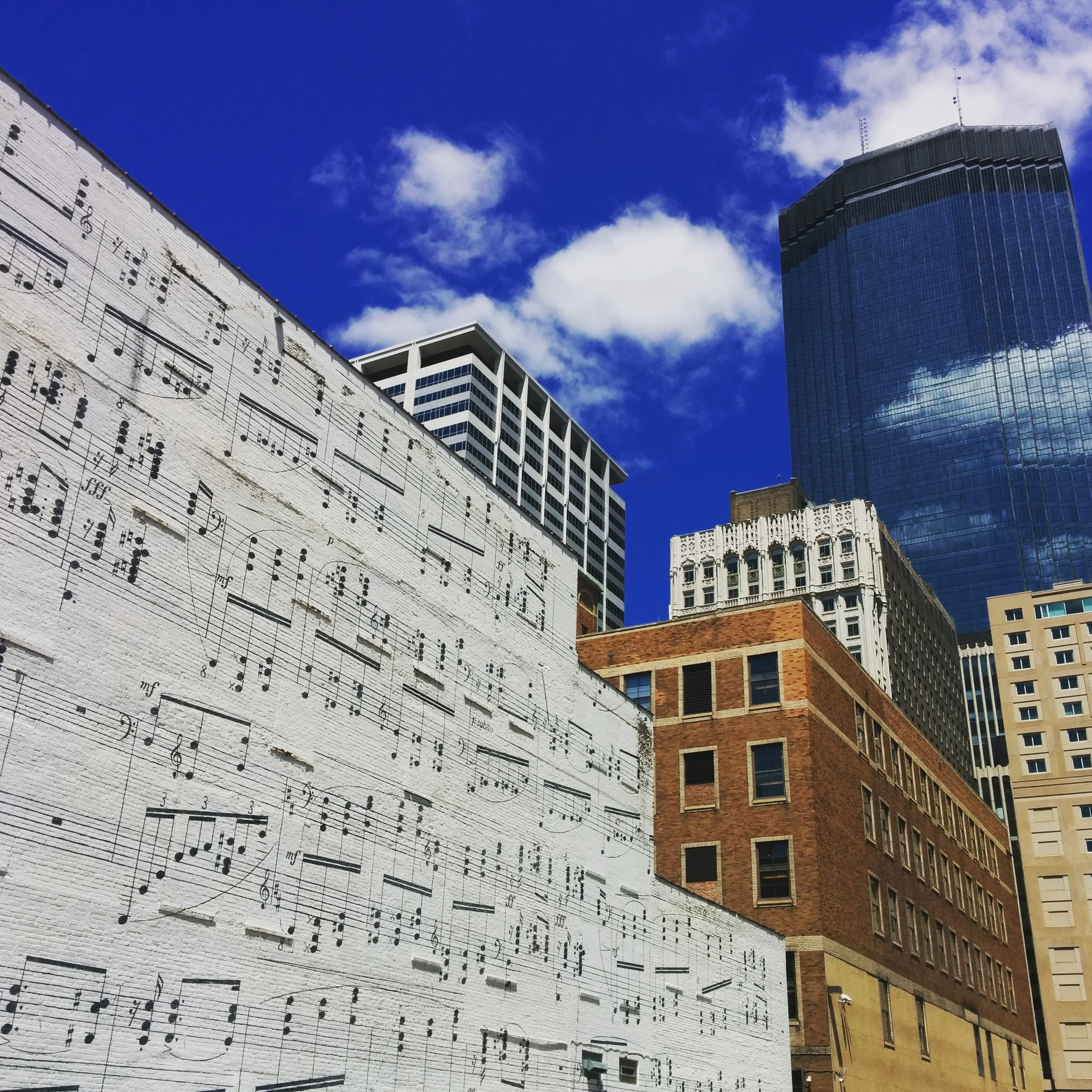
Excerpt of the third movement, Scarbo, in a mural in downtown Minneapolis, Minnesota

Written in G♯ minor and based on the poem "Scarbo", this movement depicts the nighttime mischief of a small fiend or goblin, making pirouettes, flitting in and out of the darkness, disappearing and suddenly reappearing. Its uneven flight, hitting and scratching against the walls and bed curtains, casting a growing shadow in the moonlight creates a nightmarish scene for the observer lying in his bed.

The movement contains many technical challenges: repeated notes, trills, alternating chords and leaps. Nichols compared Scarbo to "a fiendish encyclopaedia of all the traps".. Ravel reportedly said about Scarbo: "I wanted to write an orchestral transcription for the piano." A recording of Scarbo is around 9 minutes.

Scarbo

Il regarda sous le lit, dans la cheminée, dans le bahut;
– personne. Il ne put comprendre par où il s'était
introduit, par où il s'était évadé.
Hoffmann. – Contes nocturnes

He looked under the bed, in the chimney,
in the cupboard; – nobody. He could not
understand how he got in, or how he escaped.
Hoffmann. – Nocturnal Tales

Oh! que de fois je l'ai entendu et vu, Scarbo, lorsqu'à minuit la lune brille dans le ciel comme un écu d'argent sur une bannière d'azur semée d'abeilles d'or!

Oh! how often have I heard and seen him, Scarbo, when at midnight the moon glitters in the sky like a silver shield on an azure banner strewn with golden bees.

Que de fois j'ai entendu bourdonner son rire dans l'ombre de mon alcôve, et grincer son ongle sur la soie des courtines de mon lit!

How often have I heard his laughter buzz in the shadow of my alcove, and his fingernail grate on the silk of the curtains of my bed!

Que de fois je l'ai vu descendre du plancher, pirouetter sur un pied et rouler par la chambre comme le fuseau tombé de la quenouille d'une sorcière!

How often have I seen him alight on the floor, pirouette on one foot and roll through the room like the spindle fallen from the wand of a sorceress!

Le croyais-je alors évanoui? le nain grandissait entre la lune et moi comme le clocher d'une cathédrale gothique, un grelot d'or en branle à son bonnet pointu!

Did I think him vanished then? the dwarf appeared to stretch between the moon and myself like the steeple of a gothic cathedral, a golden bell wobbling on his pointed cap!

Mais bientôt son corps bleuissait, diaphane comme la cire d'une bougie, son visage blêmissait comme la cire d'un lumignon, – et soudain il s'éteignait.

But soon his body developed a bluish tint, translucent like the wax of a candle, his face blanched like melting wax – and suddenly his light went out.

== Orchestral versions ==
Gaspard de la Nuit was orchestrated by Eugene Goossens in 1942, and by Marius Constant in 1990.

== Notes ==
Sources

- Guégan, Bertrand, ed. (1925). Gaspard de la Nuit, Fantaisies à la manière de Rembrandt et de Callot, par Aloysius Bertrand. Edition publiée d'après le manuscrit de l'auteur. Paris: Payot.
- Howat, Roy (2000). "Ravel and the piano". In Mawer, Deborah (ed.). The Cambridge companion to Ravel. Cambridge companions to music. New York: Cambridge University Press. doi:10.1017/CCOL9780521640268. ISBN 978-0-521-64026-8.
- Nichols, Roger (2011). Ravel (1 ed.). New Haven, CT: Yale University Press. ISBN 978-0-300-18776-2.
