= Louis René Boulanger =

French artist (1860–1917)

- Born: 22 January 1860; Paris
- Died: 15 April 1917 (aged 57). Bourg-en-Bresse, Ain, France
- Known for: Paintings

Louis René Boulanger (1860–1917) was a French academic painter who specialized in landscapes and still lifes.

== Life ==
Born and bred in Paris, he was the son of Romantic painter Louis Candide Boulanger (1806–1867) and Adélaïde Catherine Amélie Lemonnier-Delafosse (1829–after 1900). His father died when he was only seven and his mother re-married painter Philippe Vallée. Boulanger studied at the École des Beaux-Arts with François-Louis Français (1814–1897), Edmond Charles Joseph Yon (1836–1897), and Léon Barillot (1844–1929).

In 1884 he moved to Bourg-en-Bresse and later on to Belley, in the Ain region. In Belley he was given commissions for major decorative projects such as the Caisse d'Épargne savings bank, the wedding room at the Hôtel de Ville and the Pernollet hotel-restaurant in Belley.

He returned to Bourg-en-Bresse where he died in 1917, badly affected by the Great War and the death of his son Charles.

== Career ==
Boulanger took part in the official Salon between 1891 ("Plaine d'Ambérieu") and 1909 ("Evening on the banks of the Ain"); and in the Salon de la Société Lyonnaise des Beaux-Arts between 1894 ("Le lac de Pluvis") and 1912 ("Bords du Sevron") where he obtained the First class medal in 1908 with "Soir de novembre à Pont-d'Ain".

He also sent contributions to the salons in Aix-en-Provence and Narbonne where he obtained a first class medal and a gold medal, respectively.

In 1912 he had a solo exhibition at the Velty art gallery, in Lyon.

Boulanger taught drawing and design privately in Bourg-en-Bresse, and became director of the Museum of the Royal Monastery of Brou in 1911.

In the fashion of the Barbizon school and the Lyon School, Bourg-en-Bresse (Dombes, Bresse and Bugey) became the source of inspiration for many artists who settled in the area during the second half of the 19th century. Such was the case of Horace Antoine Fonville (1832–1914), Henri Bidault (1839–1898), Antony Viot (1817–1866), Léon Dallemagne (1837–1907), and Boulanger.

In 1905 Boulanger participated in the first exhibition of the Ain Artists Society, created a year earlier, dedicating his painting "The fisherman" (Note: At the Brou Museum.) to his friend, the painter Jean-Antoine Johannès Son (1856–1942).

At the end of his life Boulanger experimented with Impressionism which was in high demand.

== Legacy ==
His production comprises mainly landscapes, but also studies of figures, and a few portraits. He enjoyed composing flower bouquets to produce still lifes which "he rendered with clarity and lightness", according to fellow painter Son.

His works are in private collections and museums such as the Musée des Ursulines in Mâcon and the museum of the Royal Monastery of Brou. (Note: Some of which were bequeathed by Alfred Chanut (1851–1918) upon his death.)

His son Charles attended the École nationale supérieure des beaux-arts de Lyon and also became a painter and taught design at the Lycée de Villefranche-sur-Saône.

In 2000, Christie's sold Louis René Boulanger's "Pink peonies in a bowl".

== Gallery ==
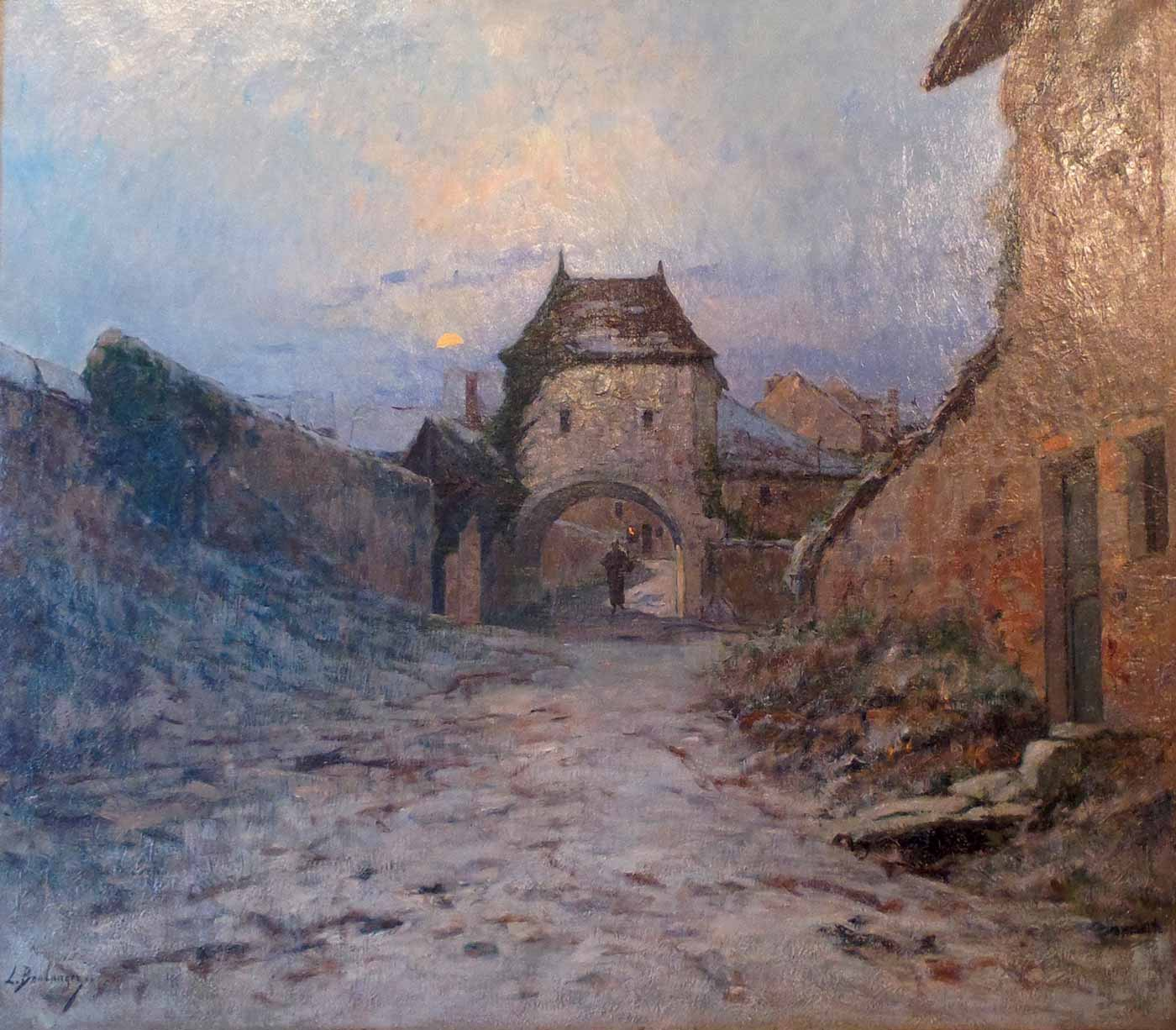
La vieille porte de Belley sous la neige, Wedding Room, Town Hall, Belley, France

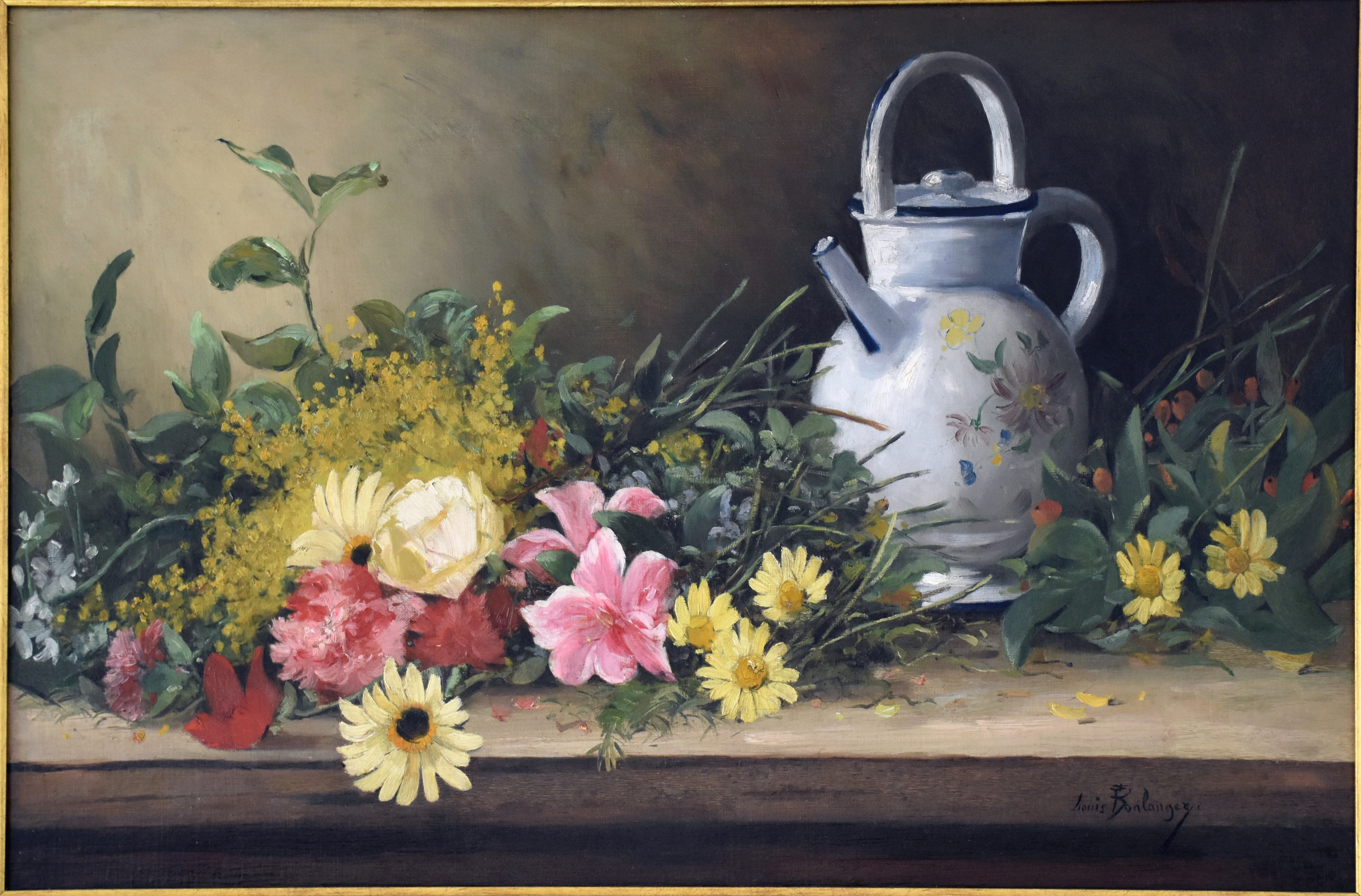
Lancer du printemps, private collection

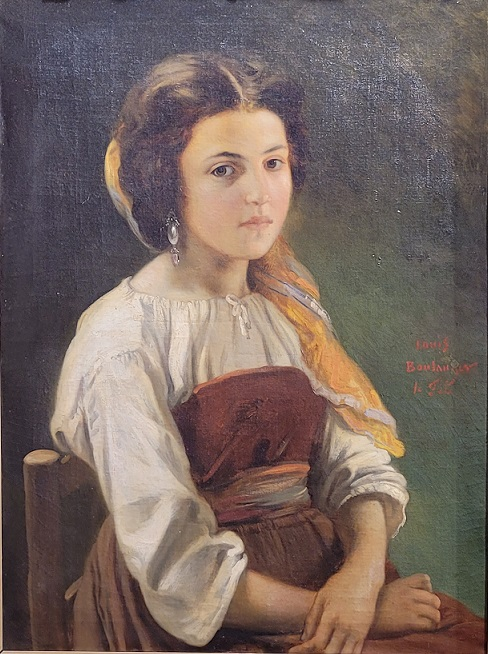
Jeune fille à la perle, Louis-René Boulanger, huile sur toile, 79 x 58,5 cm, musée de Semur-en-Auxois

== Sources ==
- Johannès Son: Louis Boulanger in "Le Courrier de l'Ain", 29 December 1922.
- Aristide Marie: "Le peintre poète Louis Boulanger", H. Floury Éditeur, 1925.
- Françoise Baudson: "Les Boulanger in Visages de l'Ain", Nº 112, 1970.
- "L'Ain, ses peintres d'hier: dictionnaire des peintres de l'Ain", Musée de Brou, 1998, pp 24 to 27.
- Pierre Angrand: "Histoire des musées de province au XIXe siècle: Rhône-Alpes", Cercle d'or, 1984, pp 87 and 91.
- Grove Dictionary of Art, 2000.
- Benezit Dictionary of Artists, 2006.
