= Double Room =

Double Room was a web-based biannual literary publication founded in 2002 by Peter Connors and Michael Neff to explore the intersection of prose poetry with flash fiction. It published work by popular poets and writers, as well as talented newcomers. The journal was edited by Mark Tursi, with assistance from Jamey Dunham, Erin Gay, and Joyelle McSweeney. Michael Neff is the publisher. The ninth issue was the final issue of Double Room published in Winter 2013.

== Contributors ==
Notable contributors include Cole Swenson, Rosmarie Waldrop, Bin Ramke, Peter Johnson, Albert Mobilo, Ron Siliman, and Russell Edson. In Issue Three, Double Room included previously unpublished work by American poet Walt Whitman.
