= Petrus Borel =

French writer (1809–1859)

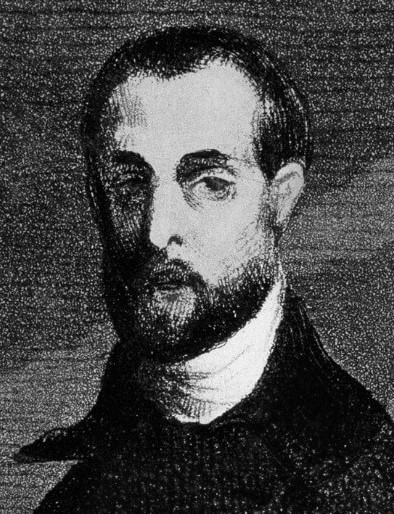
- Born: 26 June 1809; Lyon
- Died: July 14, 1859 (aged 50); Mostaganem, French Algeria
- Occupation: Writer
- Movement: Romantic movement

Joseph-Pierre Borel d'Hauterive, known as Petrus Borel (26 June 1809 – 14 July 1859), was a French writer of the Romantic movement.

== History ==
Petrus Borel was born in Lyon on 26 June 1809, the twelfth of fourteen children of an ironmonger. He studied architecture in Paris but abandoned it for literature.

Nicknamed le Lycanthrope ("Wolfman") and the centre of the circle of Bohemians in Paris, Borel was noted for his extravagant and eccentric style of writing, foreshadowing Surrealism. He was occasionally captured in drypoint by Marcellin Desboutin.

Petrus Borel was not commercially successful and was eventually directed to a minor civil service post by his friend Théophile Gautier. Borel is considered to be one of the poètes maudits, like Aloysius Bertrand or Alice de Chambrier, and is said to have influenced Baudelaire and Breton.

Petrus Borel was the subject of a 1954 biography by Irish literary critic Enid Starkie called Petrus Borel: The Lycanthrope. In 1959 Tom Moran translated Borel's 1833 Champavert: Contes Immoraux (Seven Bitter Tales) via Theo. Gaus' Sons, Brooklyn.

== Death ==
Petrus Borel died at Mostaganem in French Algeria on 14 July 1859.

== Works ==
- Rhapsodies (Poems, 1832)
- Champavert. Contes immoraux (Short stories, 1833)
- L'Obélisque de Louqsor (1836)
- Robinson Crusoe (Translation, 1836)
- Comme quoi Napoléon n'a jamais existé (1838)
- Madame Putiphar (Novel, 1839)
- Le Trésor de la Caverne d'Arcueil (Novella, 1927)
