= Prose poetry =

Literary genre

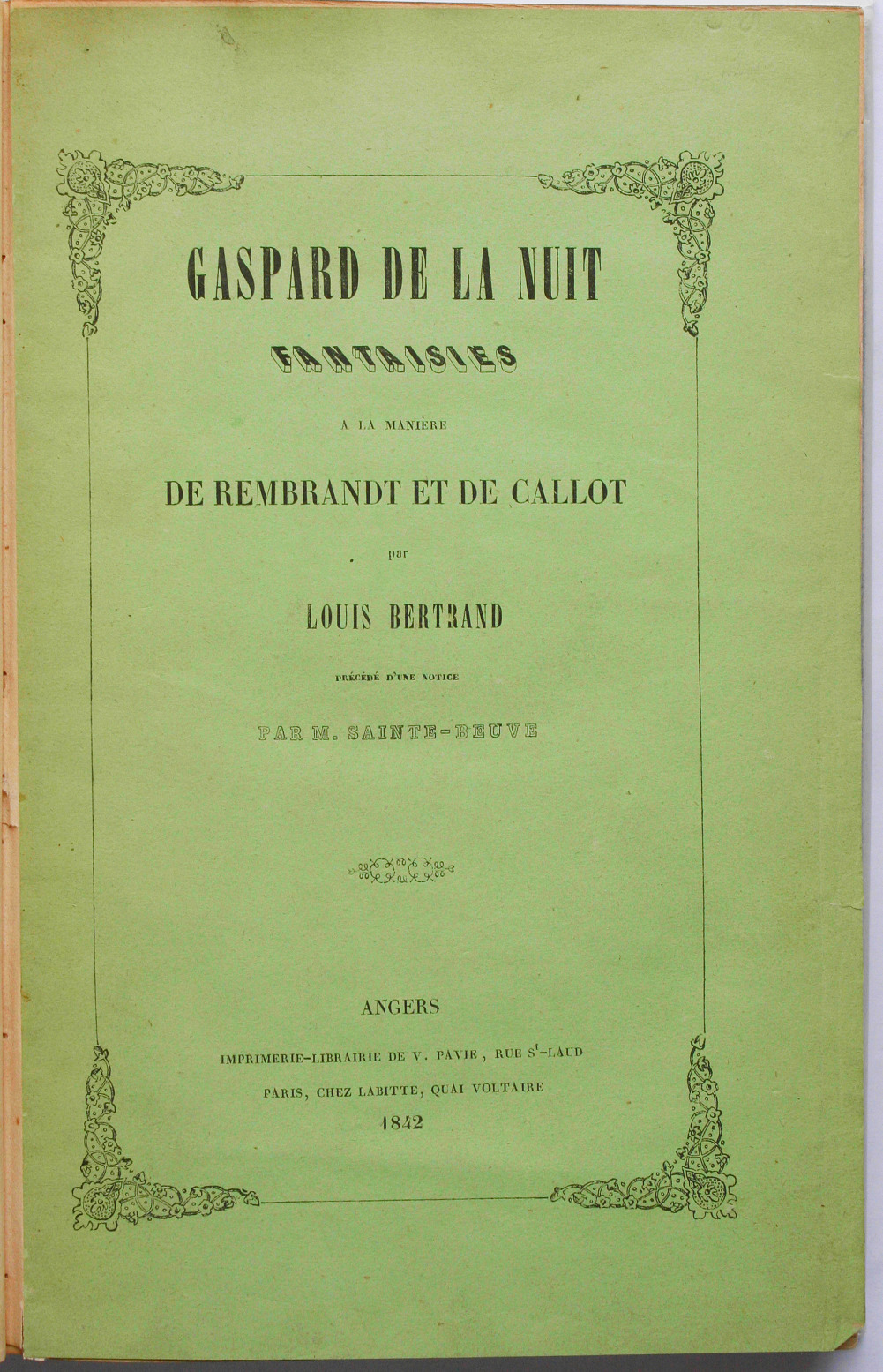
Gaspard de la Nuit (1842) by Aloysius Bertrand, one of the first western instances of prose poetry.

Prose poetry is poetry written in prose form instead of verse form while otherwise deferring to poetic devices to make meaning.

== Characteristics ==
Prose poetry is written as prose, without the line breaks associated with poetry. However, it makes use of poetic devices such as fragmentation, compression, repetition, rhyme, metaphor, and figures of speech. Prose can still express the lyricism and emotion of poetry, and can also explore many different themes. There are subgenres within the prose genre, and these include styles like deadpan narrative, surreal narrative, factoid, and postcard. Prose offers a lot of creative freedom to writers, and does not contain as many rules as some poetic styles do. Many writers have different opinions on the form of this genre because it is so open, which makes it harder to objectively define. The prose genre has been used and explored by writers like Walt Whitman, Franz Kafka, Naomi Shihab Nye, and Anne Carson. Almost every form of art can be categorized under either the prose or poetry genre. Poetry covers forms like song lyrics, different poetry forms, and dialogue that contains poetic characteristics like iambic pentameter. On the other hand, prose includes novels, short stories, novellas, and scripts.

== History ==
Although the Bible is written in prose, it maintains poetic features such as rhythms and lyricism.

In 17th-century Japan, Matsuo Bashō originated haibun, a form of prose poetry combining haiku with prose. It is best exemplified by his book Oku no Hosomichi, in which he used a literary genre of prose-and-poetry composition of multidimensional writing.

In the West, prose poetry originated in early-19th-century France and Germany as a reaction against the traditional verse line. The German Romantics Jean Paul, Novalis, Friedrich Hölderlin, and Heinrich Heine may be seen as precursors of the prose poem. Earlier, 18th-century European forerunners of prose poetry had included James Macpherson's "translation" of Ossian and Évariste de Parny's "Chansons madécasses".

At the time of the prose poem's establishment as a form, French poetry was dominated by the alexandrine, a strict and demanding form that poets starting with Maurice de Guérin (whose "Le Centaure" and "La Bacchante" remain arguably the most powerful prose poems ever written) and Aloysius Bertrand (in Gaspard de la nuit) chose, in almost complete isolation, to cease using. Later Charles Baudelaire, Arthur Rimbaud, and Stéphane Mallarmé followed their example in works like Paris Spleen and Illuminations. The prose poem continued to be written in France into the 20th century by such writers as Max Jacob, Henri Michaux, Gertrude Stein, and Francis Ponge.

In Poland, Juliusz Słowacki wrote a prose poem, Anhelli, in 1837. Bolesław Prus (1847–1912), influenced by the French prose poets, wrote a number of poetic micro-stories, including "Mold of the Earth" (1884), "The Living Telegraph" (1884) and "Shades" (1885). His somewhat longer story, "A Legend of Old Egypt" (1888), likewise shows many features of prose poetry.

In 1877–1882 Russian novelist Turgenev wrote several 'Poems in prose' (Стихотворения в прозе) which have neither poetic rhythm nor rhymes but resemble poetry in concise but expressive form.

The writings of Syrian poet and writer Francis Marrash (1836–73) featured the first examples of prose poetry in modern Arabic literature. From the mid-20th century, the great Arab exponent of prose poetry was the Syrian poet, Adunis (Ali Ahmad Said Esber, born 1930), a perennial contender for the Nobel Prize in Literature.

The Modernist poet T. S. Eliot wrote vehemently against prose poems. He added to the debate about what defines the genre, writing in his introduction to Djuna Barnes' highly poeticized 1936 novel Nightwood that it could not be classed as "poetic prose" as it did not show the rhythm or "musical pattern" of verse. By contrast, other Modernist authors, including Gertrude Stein and Sherwood Anderson, consistently wrote prose poetry. Poet and critic Donald Sidney-Fryer, a leading scholar of the works of American poet Clark Ashton Smith, praised "the extremely picturesque or pictorial character of many of Smith's typical, far-ranging, and most polished fantasies, his extended poems in prose." Canadian author Elizabeth Smart's By Grand Central Station I Sat Down and Wept (1945) is a relatively isolated example of mid-20th-century English-language poetic prose.

Prose poems made a resurgence in the early 1950s and in the 1960s with American poets Allen Ginsberg, Bob Dylan, Jack Kerouac, William S. Burroughs, Russell Edson, Charles Simic, Robert Bly, John Ashbery, and James Wright. Simic won the Pulitzer Prize for Poetry for his 1989 collection, The World Doesn't End.

Since the late 1980s, prose poetry has gained in popularity. Journals have begun specializing in prose poems or microfiction. In the United Kingdom, Stride Books published a 1993 anthology of prose poetry, A Curious Architecture.

== See also ==
- Free verse
- Lyric essay
- Fu (poetry)
- Gasa (poetry)
- Prosimetrum
- Rhymed prose
- Vignette (literature)
- Double Room
- The English Mail-Coach
- Suspiria de Profundis

== Sources ==
- Robert Alexander, C.W. Truesdale, and Mark Vinz. "The Party Train: A Collection of North American Prose Poetry." New Rivers Press, 1996.
- Michel Delville, "The American Prose Poem: Poetic Form and the Boundaries of Genre." Gainesville, FL: University of Florida, 1998
- Stephen Fredman, "Poet’s Prose: The Crisis in American Verse." 2nd ed. Cambridge: Cambridge University Press, 1990.
- Ray Gonzalez, "No Boundaries: Prose Poems by 24 American Poets." Tupelo Press, 2003.
- Christopher Kasparek, "Two Micro-stories by Bolesław Prus", The Polish Review, vol. XL, no. 1, 1995, pp. 99–103.
- David Lehman, "Great American prose poems: from Poe to the present." Simon & Schuster, 2003
- Jonathan Monroe, "A Poverty of Objects: The Prose Poem and the Politics of Genre." Ithaca, N.Y.: Cornell University Press, 1987.
- Margueritte S. Murphy, "A Tradition of Subversion: The Prose Poem from Wilde to Ashbery." Amherst, Mass.: The University of Massachusetts Press, 1992.
- Zygmunt Szweykowski, Twórczość Bolesława Prusa (The Creative Writing of Bolesław Prus), 2nd ed., Warsaw, Państwowy Instytut Wydawniczy, 1972.
