= Gaspard de la Nuit (poetry collection) =

1836 work by Aloysius Bertrand

- Le Livre de Poche edition (2002)
- Author: Aloysius Bertrand
- Translator: Paul Zweig; John T. Wright; Donald Sidney-Fryer
- Language: French
- Genre: Prose poetry, Dark romanticism
- Publication date: 1842
- Publication place: France
- English publication date: 1964 (Lettres Modernes); 1977 (University Press); 2004 (Black Coat Press)
- Media type: Print
- Pages: 164 (original)

Gaspard de la Nuit — Fantaisies à la manière de Rembrandt et de Callot (English: Gaspard of the Night — Fantasies in the Manner of Rembrandt and Callot) is the compilation of prose poems by Italian-born French poet Aloysius Bertrand. Considered one of the first examples of modern prose poetry, it was published in the year 1842, one year after Bertrand's death from tuberculosis, as a manuscript dated 1836, by his friend David d'Angers. The text includes a short address to Victor Hugo and another to Charles Nodier, and a Memoir of Bertrand written by Sainte-Beuve was included in the original 1842 edition.

The poems themselves are expressed with a strong romanticist verve, and explore fantasies of medieval Europe.

== Theme and structure ==
The author tells an introductory story of how he sat in a garden in Dijon, and fell into conversation with a dishevelled old man who sat near him leafing through a book. The stranger recognizes him to be a poet, and speaks of how he has spent his life searching for the meaning of Art ('L'art est la science du poète'), and for the elements or principles of Art. The first principle, what was sentiment in Art, was revealed to him by the discovery of some little book inscribed Gott – Liebe ('Dieu et Amour', God and Love): to have loved and to have prayed.

Then he became preoccupied by what constituted idea in Art, and, having studied nature and the works of man through thirty years, at the cost of his youth, he wondered if the second principle, that of idea, might be Satan. After a night of storm and colic in the church of Notre-Dame of Dijon, in which clarity shone through the shadows ('Une clarté piqua les ténèbres'), he concluded that the devil did not exist, that Art existed in the bosom of God, and that we are merely the copyists of the Creator.

Then the old stranger thrusts into the poet's hand the book, his own manuscript, telling all the attempts of his lips to find the instrument which gives the pure and expressive note – every trial upon the canvas before the subtle dawn-glow of the 'clair-obscur' or clarity in shadow appeared there – the novel experiments of harmony and colour, the only products of his nocturnal deliberations. The old man goes off to write his Will, saying he will come back to collect his book tomorrow. The manuscript is, naturally, Gaspard de la Nuit. Fantaisies à la manière de Rembrandt et de Callot. The next day the poet returns to restore the book to its owner, who does not come: he asks after M. Gaspard de la Nuit, to which the answer is that he is probably in Hell unless he is out on his travels - for he is, of course, the devil. 'May he roast there!' says the poet. 'I shall publish his book.'

A short preface attributed to Gaspard himself explains that the artists Paul Rembrandt [sic] and Jacques Callot represent two eternally reverse or antithetic faces of Art: one the philosopher absorbed in meditation and prayer upon the spirits of beauty, science, wisdom and love, seeking to penetrate the symbols of nature, and the other the showy figure who parades about the street, rows in the taverns, caresses bohemian girls, always swears by his rapier, and whose main preoccupation is waxing his moustache. But in considering Art under this double personification he has included studies upon other artists among his poetic meditations, which he has not presented as a formal literary theory because M. Séraphin has not explained to him the mechanism of his Chinese shadow-plays, and Punchinello conceals from curious viewers the thread which makes his arm move.

The Fantaisies of Gaspard de la Nuit, each of a few short paragraphs or extended strophes (and every one of them prefaced by a short literary quotation), are then arranged in six short books entitled 'École Flamande' (Flemish School) (9 pieces), 'Le Vieux Paris' (Old Paris) (10), 'La Nuit et ses Prestiges' (The Night and its Marvels) (11), 'Les Chroniques' (The Chronicles) (8), 'Espagne et Italie' (Spain and Italy) (8), and 'Silves' (6). There is also a group of 13 separate pieces not in the finished collection but found among the author's manuscripts, which include 'Le Gibet', the received version of 'Scarbo', and a piece addressed to the sculptor M. David.

== Etymology ==
Gaspard, a French form of Casper, is derived from Chaldean "Gizbar", denoting "the man in charge of the royal treasures". Gaspard de la Nuit thus suggestively means "treasurer of the night".

== Legacy ==
The book had an important influence upon other poets, mostly French, including Charles Baudelaire, through whom the importance of the work came to be recognized. The most famous tribute was the Suite, Gaspard de la Nuit: Trois poèmes pour piano d'après Aloysius Bertrand, of three piano pieces by Maurice Ravel based on three items, namely 'Ondine', 'Le Gibet' and 'Scarbo'. This was first performed in 1909. 'Le Gibet' was one of the supplementary pieces not included in the original 1836 manuscript, and the version of 'Scarbo' alluded to by Ravel was in the same category. The original 'Scarbo' (a different text), and 'Ondine', are numbers (ii) and (ix) respectively of the third book of Fantaisies, La Nuit et ses Prestiges. When Ravel wrote his music, the 1925 edition based on the manuscript had not yet been published.

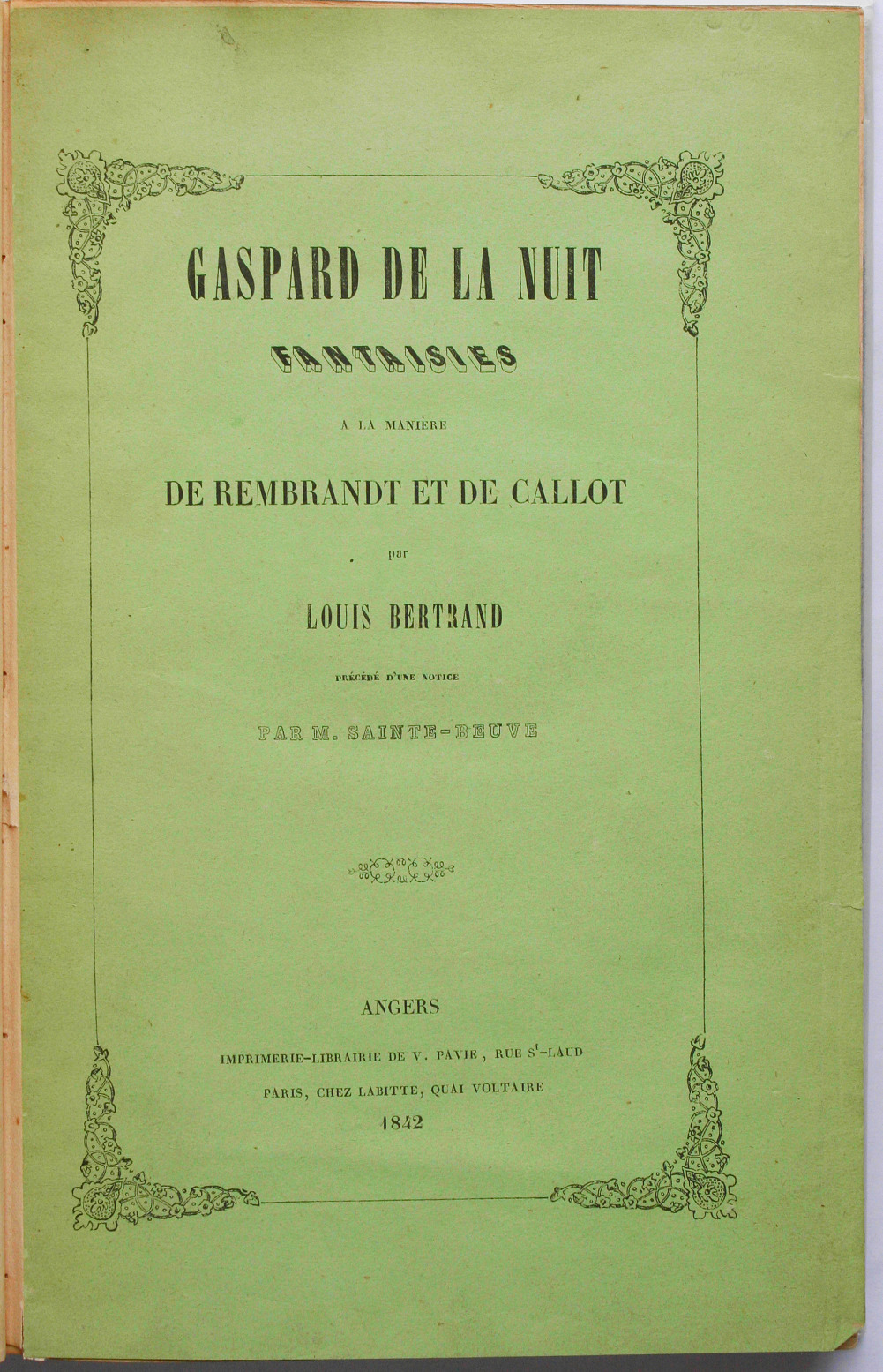
Title page of the first edition of Bertrand's Gaspard de la nuit

== English translations ==
The book has been largely unknown outside France, particularly in English-speaking countries, owing mostly to the lack of translations. Translated excerpts appeared early on in various publications. Paul Zweig's 1964 compilation entitled A Selection from Gaspard of the Night is one example.

However, there was no complete English translation of Gaspard until that in 1977 by John T. Wright, a professor of French and English at the University of South Carolina, based on the 1925 Bertrand Guégan edition of the 1836 manuscript.

A translation and adaptation by the poet Donald Sidney-Fryer published in 2004 includes notes and introductory studies.
