= Fortunius =

Fortunius (Italicized Fortunio) may be

- a Latin patronymic
  - Cassius Fortunius, son of Fortunato count of Borja (b. 685)
- a given name
  - Fortunius Licetus (1577-1657)
  - a character in Philodoxus by Leon Battista Alberti
- other
  - Papilio fortunius, a species of Papilio
  - Fortunio (novel), an 1836 novel by Théophile Gautier
  - Fortunio (opera), a 1907 opera by André Messager
  - Les Cahiers du Sud, a former French literary journal founded in 1914 as Fortunio (renamed in 1925)
