= Bouzingo =

The Bouzingo were a group of eccentric poets, novelists, and artists in France during the 1830s that practised an extreme form of romanticism whose influence helped determine the course of culture in the 20th century including such movements as Bohemianism, Parnassianism, Symbolism, Decadence, Aestheticism, Dadaism, Surrealism, the Lost Generation the Beat Generation, Hippies, Punk rock, etc.

== Legacy ==
The stories the Bouzingo wrote about themselves were full of intentional exaggerations. The stories were meant to frighten the middle and upper class. They believed that people from the middle and upper class would be offended by the idea of poets and artists acting like barbarians and primitives. This was the aim of the Bouzingo and for a time they spawned major controversies. The actual truth is now nearly impossible to find out. These artists were not well documented with any kind of journalistic objectivity during their prime. The legends of the Bouzingo are captured most notably by Gautier in "Les Jeunes-France" (1833) but also to a lesser extent in Henry Murger's "La Vie de Bohème" (1849).

=== Truth or myth? ===
These are a few of the most famous exaggerations invented by the Bouzingo:

- They hosted parties where clothes were banned and wine was consumed from human skulls.
- On street corners, they played instruments that they did not know how to play.
- Nerval was said to have walked a pet lobster on a leash because "it does not bark and knows the secrets of the sea".

== Miscellaneous ==
Members of the Bouzingo became highly influential in the Avant-Garde Movements of the Late 19th Century and into the 20th Century.

André Breton mentioned the influence of Nerval in the first Surrealist Manifesto. He also included Petrus Borel and Xavier Forneret in his influential "Anthology of Black Humor".

André Breton wrote, "To be even fairer, we could probably have taken over the word SUPERNATURALISM employed by Gérard de Nerval in his dedication to the Filles de feu... It appears, in fact, that Nerval possessed to a tee the spirit with which we claim a kinship..." - The Surrealist Manifesto, 1924

Italo Calvino included Petrus Borel and Gérard de Nerval in his anthology of "Fantastic Tales". La Main de gloire by Gérard de Nerval was a story intended to be published in the "Contes du Bouzingo".

Marcel Proust, Joseph Cornell, René Daumal, and T. S. Eliot have all cited Gérard de Nerval as a major influence. Eliot's The Waste Land borrowed one of its most enigmatic lines from Nerval's "El Desdichado".

Oscar Wilde, Joris-Karl Huysmans, and Lautréamont have all mentioned the works of Gautier as influential. His thoughts on the philosophy of "Art for Art's Sake" have continued to be the source of debate.

Gautier with Nerval and Baudelaire created the infamous Club des Hashischins dedicated to exploring experiences with drugs.

== Some members of the Bouzingo ==
- Gérard de Nerval
- Petrus Borel "the Lycanthrope"
- Théophile Gautier
- Augustus Mac Keat (Auguste Maquet)
- Philothée O'Neddy
- Xavier Forneret
- Aloysius Bertrand
- Joseph Bouchardy
- Alphonse Brot
