= Jerónima Llorente =

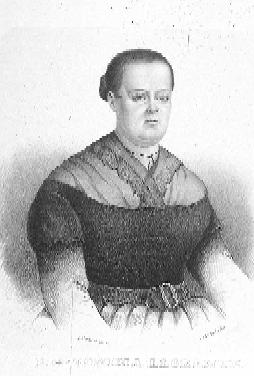
Jerónima Llorente

Jerónima Llorente (Añover de Tajo, 1793 - Madrid, 1848) was a Spanish actress of the first half of the 19th century.

== Biography ==
She was born in 1793 in the Toledo town of Añover de Tajo, which she left to fulfill her dream of being an actress. She made her debut at the age of 15 at the Teatro del Príncipe, where, directed by Juan Grimaldi, she achieved great popularity on the theater scene, playing strong characters. Her great achievements were achieved between 1835 and 1848 as a featured player of the company of Matilde Diez and Julián Romea, interpreting characters by Leandro Fernández de Moratín and Manuel Bretón de los Herreros.

== Death and legacy ==
She died in 1848, and had a street dedicated in her honor in Madrid since 1887.

Her remains, from the San Sebastián cemetery, were reburied in the Pantheon of Illustrious Men of the Cementerio de San Justo in Madrid in 1934.
