= Garrick Médecin =

Short story by Joseph Bouchardy

Garrick Médecin is a short story written by Joseph Bouchardy, printed 1835/1836 in installments in the newspaper Le Monde Dramatique which was founded by his brother, Anatole Bouchardy. It was the basis for several plays including Sullivan (1852) and Le Docteur Robin (1842) which were respectively adapted into the English plays David Garrick (1864) and Doctor Davy (1865). In 2015, the story was translated into English as "The Acting Physician" and published in Vol. 3 No. 2 of Romance Magazine.

== Plot ==
The plot concerns Doney, the Duke of Tavistock, promising a reward of twenty thousand pounds to the doctor who can cure his daughter Anna of her passion for Shakespeare and David Garrick -- a passion so intense that she is refusing an arranged marriage to a wealthy baronet. A plucky servant of the household tries to claim the reward for himself by hiring Garrick to visit the daughter, though Garrick refuses to accept any payment for the job. Meanwhile, Garrick has unknowingly developed an admiration for Anna due to some poetry she anonymously mailed to him. The Duke goes to visit Garrick, who assures him that his intentions are honorable, and so the Duke allows the plan to go forward.

Lady Anna is visited first by a drunken ex-servant who reports that Garrick is abusive to his servants and to his girlfriends, before he reveals that he actually is Garrick in disguise. Anna is horrified to have seen the leading man convincingly play the part of a lowlife. She later overhears her father in conversation with a man, discussing the merits of stage actors and the theater; the gentleman argues that people need to be more aware that actors are only actors and plays are only imaginary stories. After the man leaves, the Duke reveals that it was Garrick he had been talking to. Anna's illusions are destroyed, and she is finally convinced to go ahead with her arranged marriage to the baronet. In a final scene, Anna and Garrick are reunited several decades later, and Garrick confesses he had been in love with Anna the whole time.

== Sources ==
William Davenport Adams, "A Dictionary of Drama."

Maurice Wilson Disher, "The Last Romantic."

http://www.sylvie-lecuyer.net/lepetitcenacle.html
