= Alphonse Brot =

French writer (1807–1895)

Charles Alphonse Brot
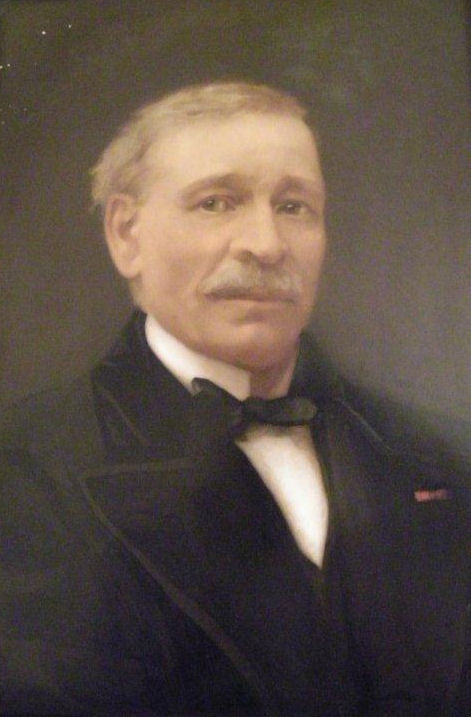
- Born: 12 April 1807; Paris, France
- Died: 3 January 1895 (aged 87); Paris, France
- Occupation: Author

Charles Alphonse Brot (French: [alfɔ̃s bʁo]; 12 April 1807 – 3 January 1895) was a prolific French author and playwright.

== Life ==
Charles Alphonse Brot was born on 12 April 1807 in Paris. He studied at the Lycée Bonaparte (now the Lycée Condorcet), in the 9th arrondissement of Paris. Brot became a member of the romantic literary group les Jeunes-France (Young France), sometimes called les Bouzingos, which also included Théophile Gautier, Gérard de Nerval, Jules Vabre, Petrus Borel, Philothée O’Neddy, Augustus McKeat, Aloysius Bertrand, Joseph Bouchardy, Louis Boulanger, Achille Devéria, Eugène Devéria, Célestin Nanteuil and Jehan de Seigneur. He wrote many well-received dramas.

In 1836 a critic wrote of his work, "M. Alphonse Brot furiously loves women swimming in the ether. His heroines are always called Arièle, Stella; they are pure, they are heavenly, and the best eyes in the world would discover not the slightest blemish on their souls, or even on their white robes. ... His talent is a mixture of reveries and feelings that has difficulty capturing the colors of history..."

Brot and Antony Béraud were co-directors from 1840 to 1842 of the Théâtre de l'Ambigu-Comique on the Boulevard St-Martin, Paris. On 7 January 1847 Brot married Eugénie Girault-Duvivier. From 1848 to 1872 he worked with the Ministry of the Interior as head of the printing and book selling office. Brot was awarded the Legion of Honour on 15 August 1864.

He died on 3 January 1895 in Paris, and was buried in Montmartre cemetery. His body was moved to Père Lachaise Cemetery in 1901.

== Works ==
=== Poetry ===
- Chants d’Amour (1829) Ladvocat, Paris + L. Janet, Paris

=== Novels ===
- Une Aventure de Shakespeare.
- Ainsi soit-il. Sylvestre Fils, Paris. 1833.
- Priez pour elles. Sylvestre Fils, Paris. 1833.
- Entre Onze heures et Minuit. Hippolyte souverain, Paris. 1833.
- La Tour de Londres. A. Labot et C. Lelong, Paris. 1835.
- Jane Grey. Hippolyte souverain, Paris. 1835.
- Carl Sand. Hippolyte souverain, Paris. 1836.
- Folles amours. Hippolyte souverain, Paris. 1836.
- La chute des feuilles. Hippolyte souverain, Paris. 1837.
- Seule au monde. Hippolyte souverain, Paris. 1838.
- La Comtesse aux trois galants. Hippolyte souverain, Paris. 1839.
- La nuit terrible. Hippolyte souverain, Paris. 1840.
- Soirée aux aventures. Hippolyte souverain, Paris. 1840.
- Les secrets de famille. Hippolyte souverain, Paris. 1841.
- Le marchand d'Habits. 1841.
- Les Mystères de Province. Hippolyte souverain, Paris. 1843.
- Le bord de l'eau. Hippolyte souverain, Paris. 1844.
- La Sirène de Paris. Hippolyte souverain, Paris. 1845.
- Les couvents. J. Mallet et Cie, Paris. 1846.
- Le Médecin du Cœur. Hippolyte souverain, Paris. 1846.
- Réveille-Matin. Hippolyte souverain, Paris. 1847.
- La terre promise. Hippolyte souverain, Paris. 1849.
- La place des Terreaux. Hippolyte souverain, Paris. 1852.
- Deux Coups de tonnerre. Hippolyte souverain, Paris. 1853.
- Un nouveau roman. Hippolyte souverain, Paris. 1853.
- Une soirée d'hiver. Louis Chappe, Paris [2]. 1857.
- Les Deux Péchés. Louis Chappe, Paris. 1857.
- La Sirène de Paris. Lécrivain et Toubon, Paris. 1860.
- La Terre promise. Lécrivain et Toubon, Paris. 1861.
- Le Bourreau du roi. 1862.
- Sur la Tombe de Mademoiselle Toche. 1862.
- La Cousine du roi. A. Faure, Paris. 1866.
- Les espions. Moniteur Universel, Paris. 1874.
- Miss Million. Jules Rouff, Paris. 1880.
- Les nuits terribles. Jules Rouff, Paris. 1880.
- Les Compagnons de l'Arche. Jules Rouff, Paris. 1881.
- La déesse raison. Dentu, Paris. 1881.
- Une réparation. 1881.
- Heureuse comme une reine. 1881.

=== Dramas ===
- Juliette. Marchant, Paris. 1834.
- Les Enfans du fermier. Nobis, Paris. 1837.
- Alix ou les Deux Mères. J-N Barba + Delloye + Bezou, Paris. 1838.
- Edith ou la Veuve de Southampton. J Marchant, Paris. 1840.
- La Lescombat. Marchant, Paris. 1841.
- Le marchand d'Habits. 1841.
- Les Brigands de la Loire. 1842.
- L'Auberge de la Madone. J Marchant, Paris. 1842.
- La tour de Londres. J Marchant, Paris. 1855.
- Jane Grey. J Marchant, Paris. 1856.
- La Marnière des Saules. J Marchant, Paris. 1858.
- Le Testament d'Elisabeth. J Marchant, Paris. 1867.
- Le Gendre du colonel. J Marchant, Paris. 1872.
- Le Spadassin.
- Un Amour fatal.
- Gaëtan il marmonne.

=== Vaudevilles ===
- Les Dettes criardes. 1842.
- Les Exploits de César. Beck, Paris. 1855.
- Le Meurtrier de Théodore. Michel Levy Frères, Paris. 1865.
- Le Capitaine Clair-de-Lune.
- La Veuve Loustalot.
- Paris la nuit.

== Sources ==
- "BROT Alphonse (1809-1895)". Association des Amis et Passionnés du Père-Lachaise. Archived from the original on 2017-10-05.
- Malo, Charles (1836). La France littéraire [ed. by C. Malo].
