= Manuel Cabral Aguado-Bejarano =

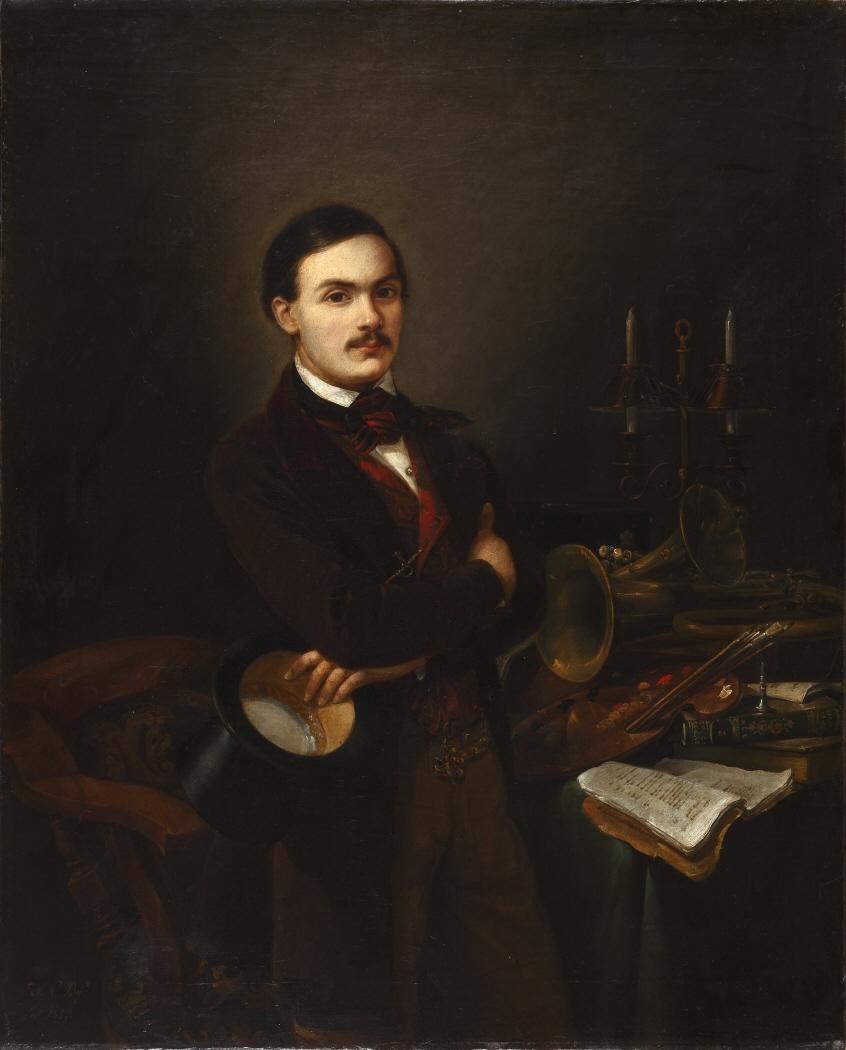
Self-portrait (1851)

Manuel Cabral Aguado-Bejarano (1827 in Seville – 1891 in Seville) was a Spanish painter in the Romantic style; best known for his Costumbrismo scenes.

== Biography ==
He was the son of the painter, Antonio Cabral Bejarano. He actually began his studies with José Domínguez Bécquer and only later took lessons from his father. In 1845, he enrolled at what is now the Real Academia de Bellas Artes de Santa Isabel de Hungría in Seville. After graduating, he was named an honorary "Painter to the Queen" (Isabel II). Many years later, he became a Professor there.

He received honorary mention at the Exposiciones Nacionales de Bellas Artes in 1858, 1864, 1879 and 1880, (in Cádiz), and in 1856, 1858, 1867 and 1878 in Seville. His great attention to the fine details of dress, architecture and everyday objects makes his paintings of significant documentary value.

Although he is most familiar as a painter of genre scenes, he also produced many portraits; notably those for the French Ducal family of Montpensier, for whom he worked in 1877, and the actors, Teodora Lamadrid (dressed in her role of Adriana Lecouvreur) and Julián Romea (dressed as Sullivan). The latter works may be seen at the Museo del Romanticismo in Madrid. Other important examples of his work may be found at the Carmen Thyssen Museum in Málaga.

By the time of his death, his works had come to be considered old-fashioned.

== Selected paintings ==
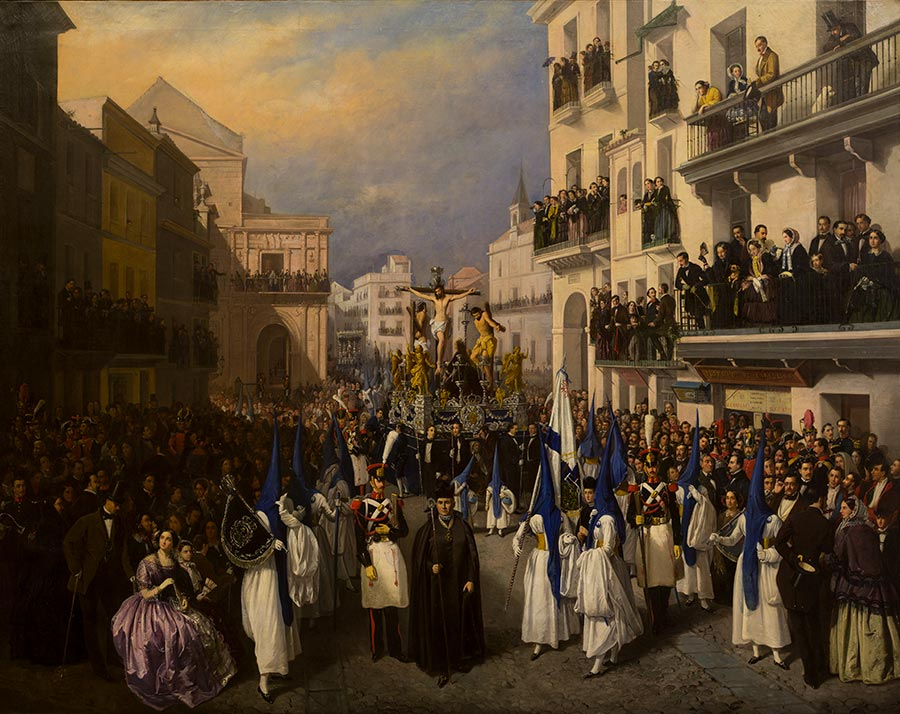
Procession in Seville

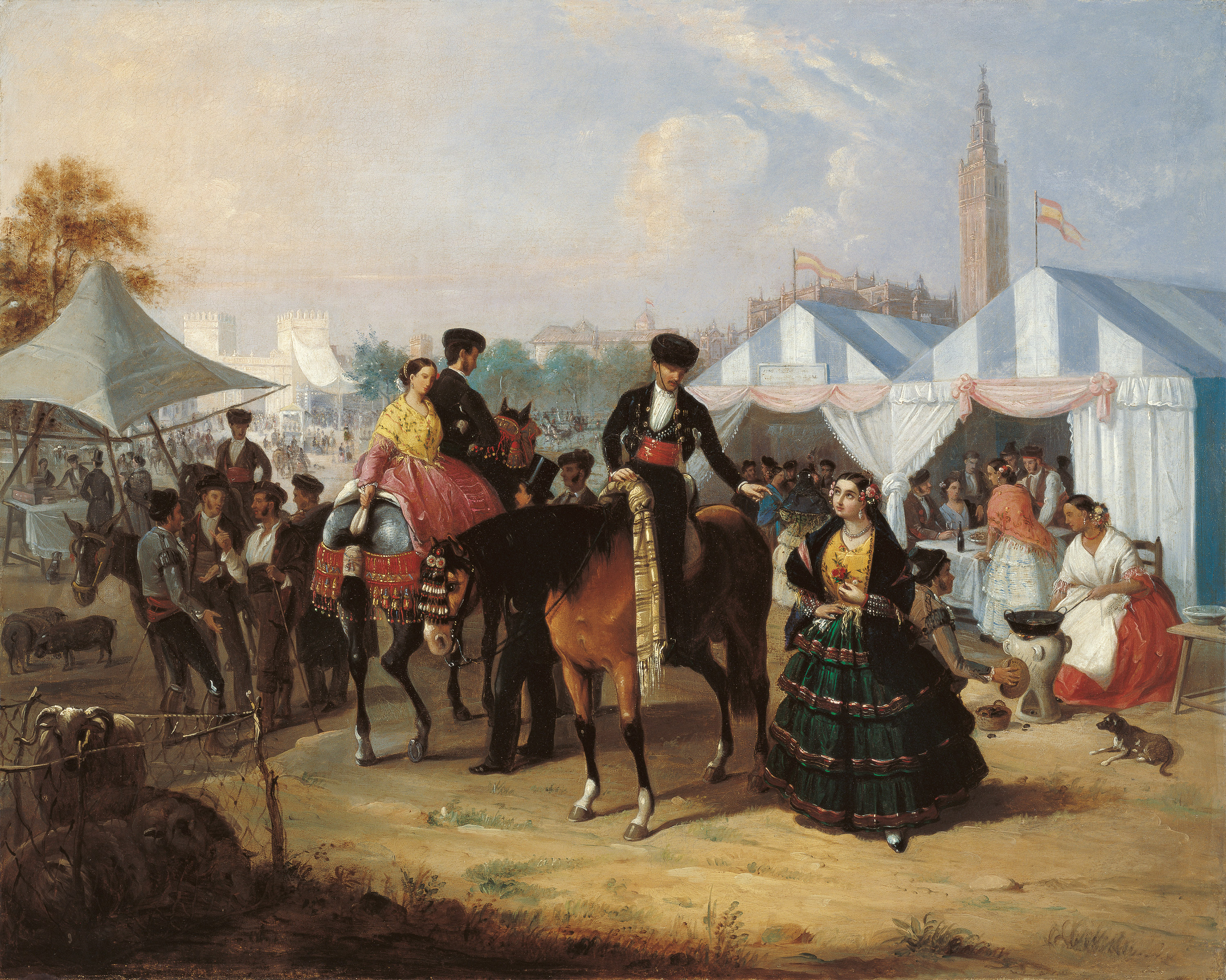
At the Fair in Seville

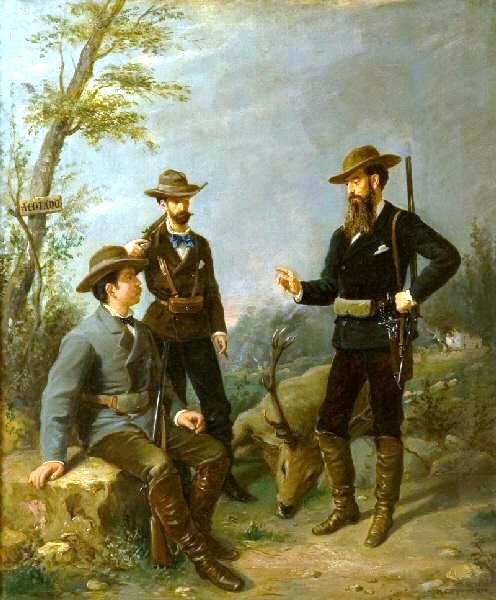
Antoine, Duke of Montpensier with His Hunting Companions

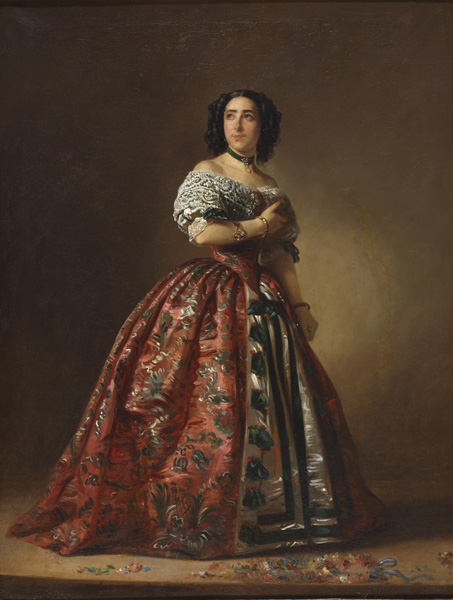
Teodora Lamadrid as Adriana Lecouvreur
