= Xavier Forneret =

French writer and poet

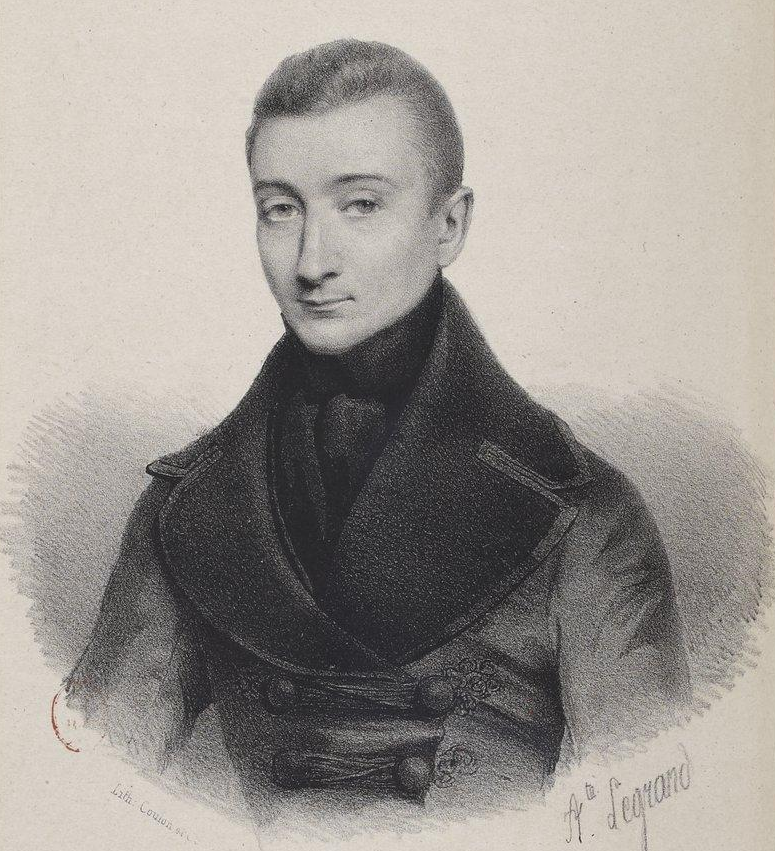
Xavier Forneret in 1840

Xavier Forneret (16 September 1809 in Beaune, Côte-d'Or – 7 July 1884) was a French writer, poet, playwright and journalist.

== Life ==
Born in 1809 bourgeois family by the name Antoine Charles Ferdinand, he was one of the few members of the Romantic movement who never experienced poverty and could afford to publish his books himself. In his hometown, he became an advocate of the new art. Between 1837 and 1840 he lived in Paris. Spiritually, he was a member of the Bouzingo, a group of poets which advocated a radical bohemian romanticism in life and art; contemporaries and kindred spirits included Gérard de Nerval and Théophile Gautier, yet the Cénacle in the Rue du Doyenné never accepted him as a member, since the radical romantics saw him as an eccentric bourgeois with little talent. He returned to Beaune after three years, living his life of a rich eccentric man (he lived in an old gothic tower which had all walls painted black and silver, played the violin by an open window all night, and slept in a coffin). In 1848, he unsuccessfully tried to become a republican politician. He died aged 74, forgotten by both critics and readers.

== Works ==
In 1835 he wrote two plays which were staged in Dijon. He paid for the staging; both were total commercial failures. During his years in Paris, he published books (with the text usually printed on one side of the paper only, in an enormously large font) which included poems, aphorisms, paradoxes, short prosaic pieces and maxims. He also published several short stories, usually parodies of the then fashionable frenetic (horror) style (in one of them, an unhappy man commits suicide by swallowing the glass eye of his mistress). All these books were self-published and ignored by readers.

Interest in his works started to appear after 1918. His reputation was partly rehabilitated by André Breton, who included some of Forneret's poems and aphorisms in his Anthology of Black Humor.

The Grand Prix de l'Humour Noir Xavier Forneret is named in his memory. Recent winners include Serge Joncour, Franz Bartelt and Tom Sharpe.

A collection of Forneret's work was published in 2013 under the title Écrits complets.

== Selected bibliography ==
- Contes et récits
- Deux destinées, 1834
- L'homme noir (The Black Man), 1835, a play
- Vingt-trois. Trente-cinq (Twenty three. Thirty five), 1835, a play
- Rien... quelque chose, 1836
- Sans titre (Untitled), 1838
- Vapeurs, ni vers ni prose et sans titre, par un homme noir, blanc de visage (Vapours, neither poetry nor prose, written by a black man with a white face), 1838
- Encore un an de "sans titre", 1840
- Pièce de pièces, temps perdu, 1840
- Voyage d'agrément de Beaune à Autun, 1850
- Lettre à Victor Hugo, 1851
- Lignes rimées, 1853
- Mère et fille, 1854
- L'infanticide, 1856
- Ombre de poésie, 1860
- Quelques mots sur la peine de mort, 1861
- Broussailles de pensées, 1870

== In popular culture ==
In the 1992 British horror-romance film, Tale of a Vampire, a centuries-old vampire and scholar (Julian Sands) approaches an occult-specialist librarian (Suzanna Hamilton) whom he sees reading an antique volume of Forneret's works. He tells her that his favourite poem by Forneret is "Le pauvre honteux" ("A Shameful Pauper")—"about a starving man who eats his own hand".
