= Sullivan (play) =

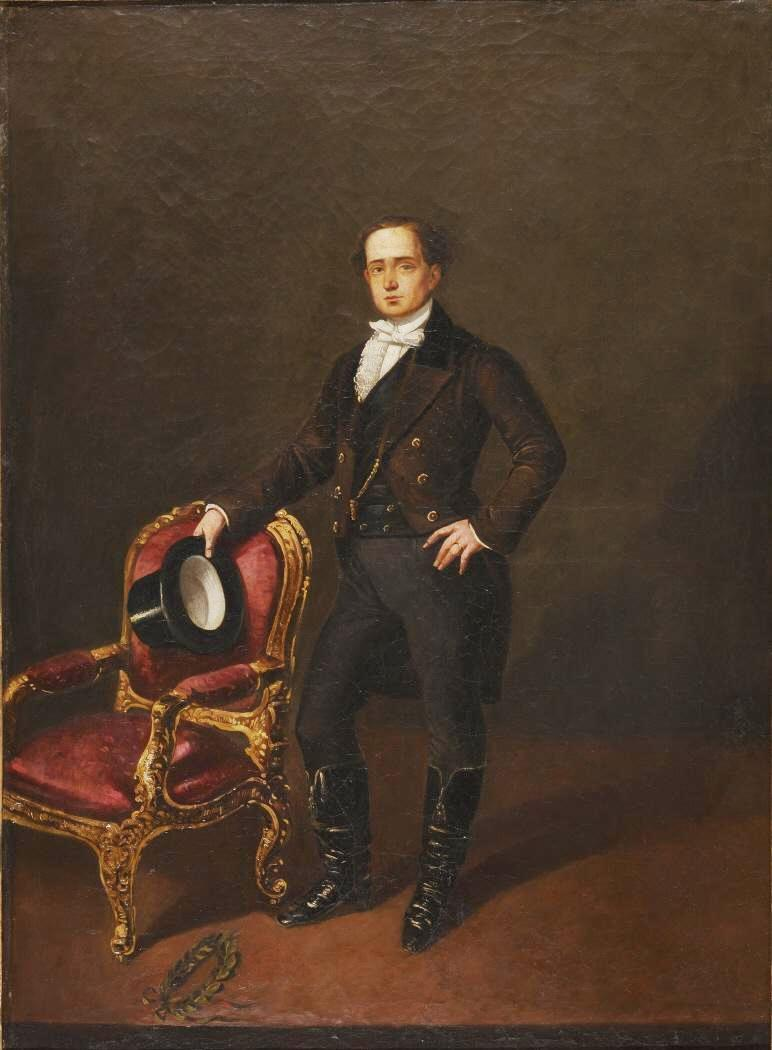
The Spanish actor, Julián Romea as Sullivan; by Manuel Cabral Aguado-Bejarano (1853)

Sullivan was a three-act comedy by Anne-Honoré-Joseph Duveyrier de Mélésville, based on the short story Garrick Médecin. It was first played at Paris, in the Théâtre-Français, November 11, 1852. The original cast are:

- Nicol Jenkins, a wealthy merchant - Mr. Provost
- Lèlia, his daughter - Ms. Favart
- Sullivan, a comic actor from Drury Lane Theater - Mr. Brindeau
- Sir Frédéric Dumple, nephew of Jenkins - Got
- Saunders, a broker - Anselme
- Mistress Saunders, his wife - Mrs. Thénard
- Merwyn, a silks merchant - Mr. Montet
- Miss Pénélope, his sister - Ms. Joussain
- Peacock, a lawyer - Mr. Mirecourt
- Little-John, Jenkins' valet - Castel
- Dickson, Sullivan's valet - Mathien
- An Alderman
- Servants

Though Garrick Médecin had focused on the adventures of actor David Garrick, de Mélésville did not wish to do a historical piece, and so used the then-contemporary Shakespearean actor Barry Sullivan as his subject, though he changed the character's first name in the play to George, probably to avoid any possible legal troubles. A few years after it was produced, Sullivan was adapted into the English play David Garrick by Robertson, with Garrick returned to the leading role.
