= David Garrick (play) =

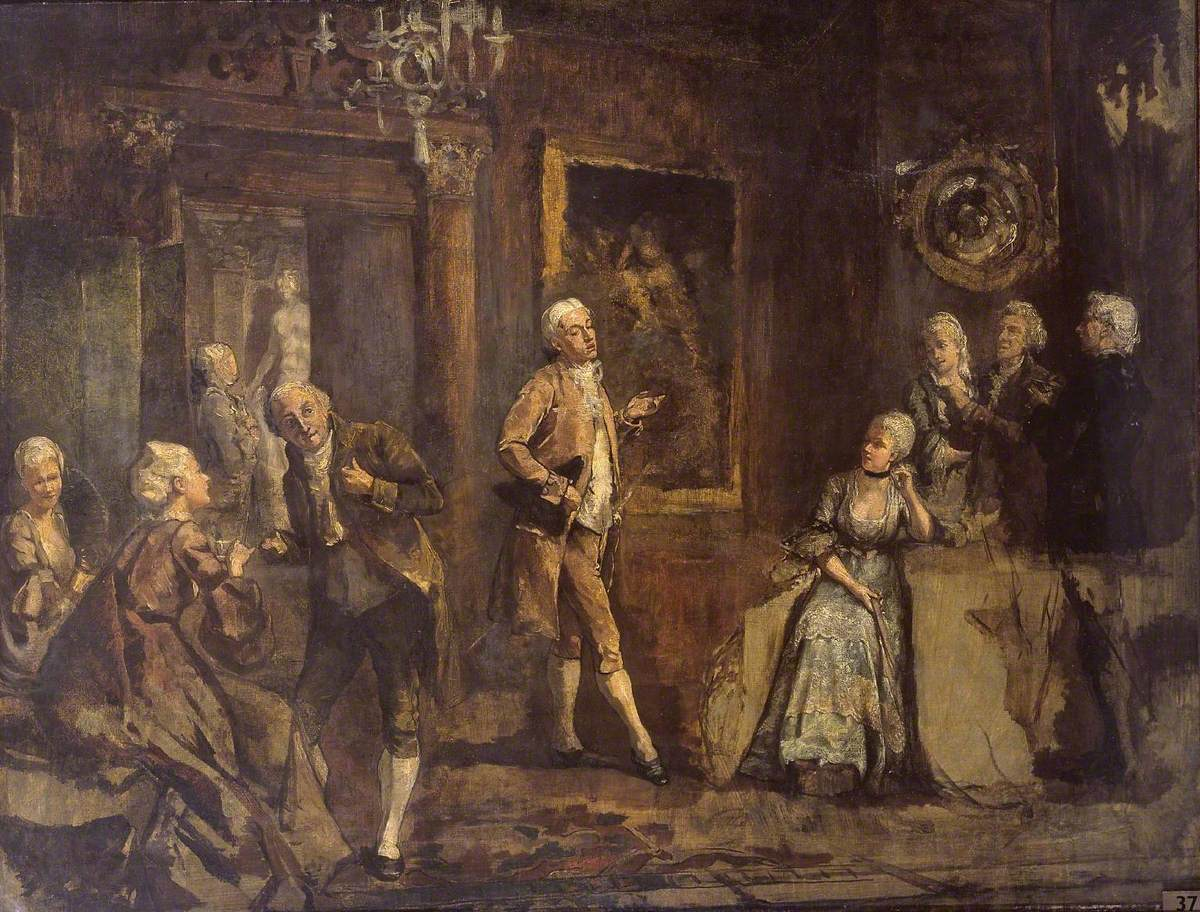
Scene from the play by Edward Matthew Ward

David Garrick is a comic play written in 1856 by Thomas William Robertson about the famous 18th-century actor and theatre manager, David Garrick.

The play premiered at the Prince of Wales Theater in Birmingham, where it was successful enough to be moved to the Haymarket Theatre in London, on 30 April 1864. It was a major success for the actor Edward Askew Sothern, who played the title role, but came later to be associated with the actor Charles Wyndham. The play was designed as a star vehicle, since the principal actor has to portray David Garrick himself as an actor giving a performance. A scene from the play was painted by Edward Matthew Ward, a friend of Sothern's.

The play was Robertson's first major commercial success and was frequently revived throughout the Victorian era and beyond. Several silent films were made based on David Garrick, including versions in 1913 (starring Seymour Hicks and Ellaline Terriss), 1914 and 1916. A 1923 book, Public Speaking Today, recommends it for performance by high school students alongside The Importance of Being Earnest and The Rivals. In 1922, the play was adapted as a comic opera by Reginald Somerville and played at the Queen's Theatre.

== History ==
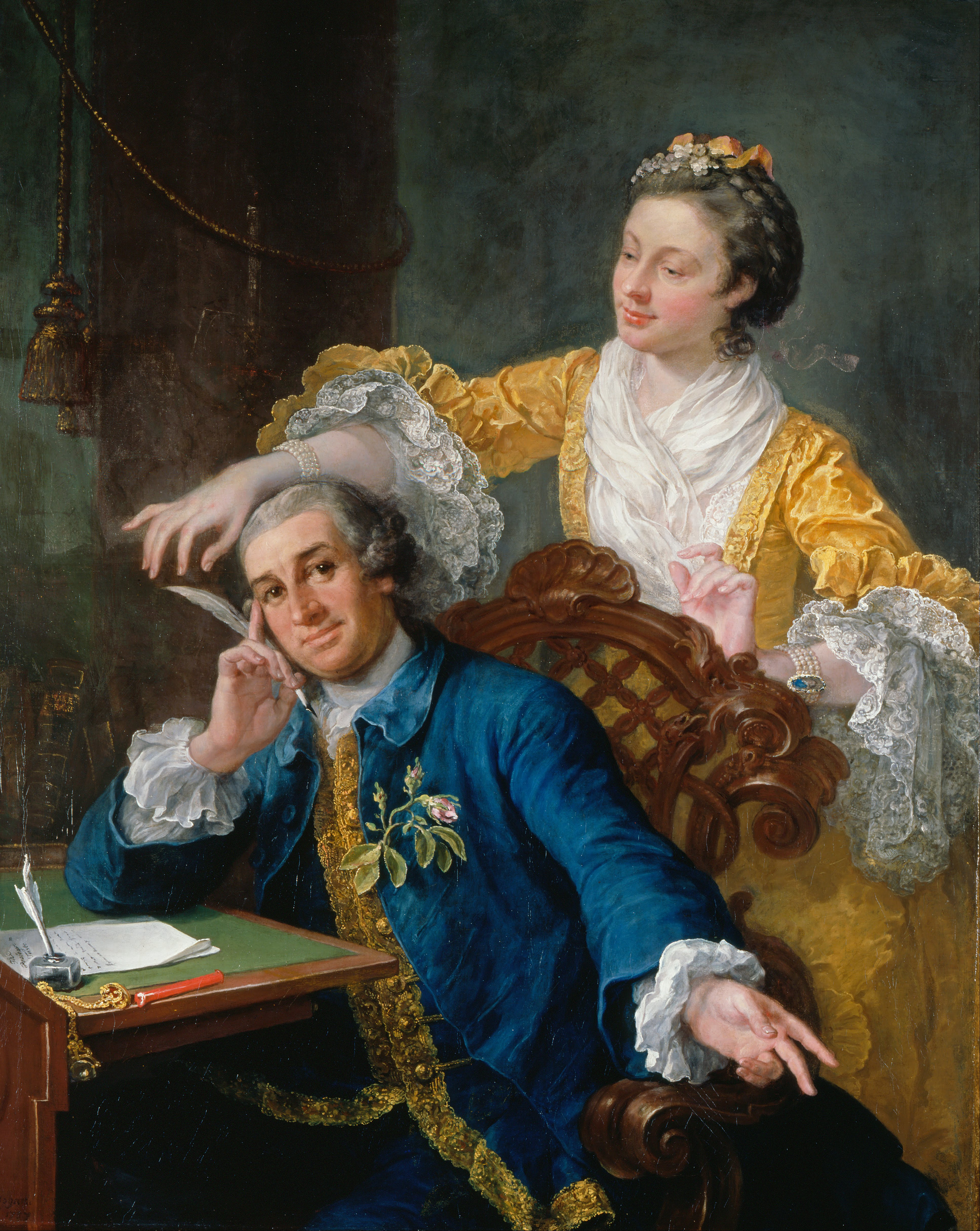
Garrick and his wife, Eva Marie Veigel, painted by William Hogarth. The painting is in the Royal Collection at Windsor Castle.

The play was evidently written in 1856, after Robertson saw a French theatre troupe performing Sullivan; but the new play was rejected by every theatre manager Robertson took it to. He sat on it for many years, then eventually showed it to Sothern, who took interest in the project. Reportedly, as Sothern read the play aloud to his manager John Buckstone –

[Sothern] frequently interrupted himself with such remarks as "Capital" "First-rate!" "Strong situation!" and "I like that!" But when he came to the party scene, in which David acts like a madman, Sothern became so excited that he began to smash the glasses and upset the furniture. "I think that will do, Bucky?" he said to his manager. "Yes, it will do," replied Buckstone, "and I rather like that fellow Chevy [sic]."

After some revisions at Sothern's request, Robertson was able to sell the play for a sum of £10.

Robertson's story of Garrick has very little to do with fact: among other things, it ends with Garrick presumably married to a woman named Ada Ingot—Garrick's real wife was Eva Marie Veigel. Robertson was quoted as saying, in response to critics of this historical inaccuracy, "The real, actual Mr. David Garrick was not married until the year 1749. Whatever adventures may have occurred to him before that time are a legitimate theme for speculation." He then suggests that Ada and Garrick could have been prevented from marrying by death, break-up or other external factors, and thus his story would not be contradictory to history.

The story is, according to the title page of most printed versions, "Adapted from the French of Sullivan, which was founded on a German Dramatization of a pretended Incident in Garrick's Life." Sullivan was a French comic play of 1852 by Anne-Honoré-Joseph Duveyrier de Mélésville, which Adams' Dictionary of Drama claims to have been based on Joseph Bouchardy's 1836 short story Garrick Médecin. The confusion with the "German dramatization" appears to be thus – Garrick Médecin was adapted into another French play entitled Le Docteur Robin, which became widely known through a German translation. A misunderstanding caused the belief that Sullivan was actually based on Doktor Robin rather than the two being based on a mutual source, as evidenced in an 1895 article in The New York Times. Another German play, Garrick in Bristol, added to the confusion.

== Characters ==
Edward Sothern in the title role, 1864

- David Garrick, A famous actor
- Mr. Simon Ingot, A wealthy businessman, father to Ada
- Squire Richard Chivy, Ada's distant cousin and her fiancé
- Mr. Alexander Smith, A friend of Ingot
- Mr. Brown, A friend of Ingot, father of Araminta
- Mr. Jones, Friend of Ingot and paramour of Araminta
- Thomas, Ingot’s butler
- George, Garrick’s valet
- Ada Ingot, Betrothed unwillingly to Chivy, in love with Garrick from afar
- Mrs. Smith, wife of Mr. Smith
- Miss Araminta Brown, Daughter of Mr. Brown, beloved of Mr. Jones
- Two Servants, Ingot’s employees

== Plot summary ==
The action takes place in 1740s London.

A young woman, Ada, has developed a crush on the actor David Garrick so strong that she refuses to accept a marriage arranged by her father, Mr. Ingot. Ingot contrives to meet with Garrick and initially tries to persuade him to leave the country or give up acting, but when Garrick learns the reason, he assures Ingot that he will be able to cure Ada of her attraction and asks Ingot to arrange a meeting with her. Garrick is sympathetic to Ada's plight because he himself has fallen in love with a girl he doesn't know, but he promises Ingot that he will not make any romantic moves towards Ada.

Garrick is invited to a dinner party at Ingot's house, where he is stunned and horrified to realise that Ada is the very girl he had been admiring from afar, but because of his promise, he goes through with his plan. He spends the evening antagonizing the other guests and pretending to be a drunk and a gambler. When he leaves, Ada is crushed, but she agrees to go through with the marriage her father intends for her. Her fiancé Richard Chivy arrives, actually as drunk as Garrick was just pretending to be, and he tells the Ingots about how he just met David Garrick at his club and listened to him tell a story of how he had spent an evening pretending to be a scoundrel so as to cure a girl of her attraction to him. Chivy does not recognise that the story is about Ada and her father, though they both recognise themselves, and Ada is cheered by the news. Chivy then mentions how someone at the club insulted the girl and father of Garrick's story, and that Garrick is now scheduled to fight a duel with the man.

The next day, Ada goes to Garrick's home, both to escape her impending marriage and to try to stop the duel set for later in the day. Chivy has followed her, and she hides from him. Garrick learns that Ada is hiding in the room, but he plays dumb and offers to help Chivy look for her, until the two men leave together for the duel. Not long after they leave, Ingot arrives and finds Ada. He says he will disown her because of how she has misbehaved. Ada is so upset by the news that she faints. Ingot tries to tell her he didn't mean it, but when he sees she has fainted unconscious he goes to get help. Ada then awakens, the last thing she heard being that she was disowned. Garrick eventually comes into the room, having won the duel, and tries to comfort Ada. He convinces her that her father loves her and that she should listen to him. Ingot overhears this and decides that David Garrick is a better man than Chivy, who by now has left in pursuit of Garrick's housemaid, and so he agrees to allow Ada to marry him.

== Notable scene ==
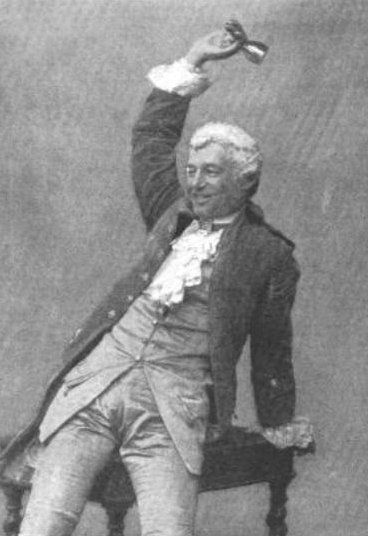
Garrick (Charles Wyndham) feigns drunkenness

One of the play's defining moments is the point when Garrick's feigned drunkenness appears to work, and Ada forces him to leave the party. Garrick makes an exit of high comedy, improving upon past insults to the other guests and quoting from Shakespeare's Coriolanus before destroying a window fixture with his exit:

ADA. If you do not leave, the servants shall turn you out.

GARRICK. And serve him right, too. (releases SMITH, and goes up C., a little. To INGOT, aside). Get me out of this, I can't bear it longer. (aloud) Put out old Coco. I am going. Good-bye, mother of seventy children.

MRS. SMITH. Oh!

GARRICK. Good-bye, Cold Muffins.

SMITH. Cold Muffins!

GARRICK. Farewell! (pathetically.) Farewell, and treasure deep that which I love the most yet leave behind. Farewell!

SMITH (follows GARRICK up C.) Jones, kick him out.

GARRICK (turns fiercely and SMITH runs down L. C., front). Kick!

"You common cry of curs, whose breath I hate

As reek o' the rotten fens, whose loves I prize

As the dead carcasses of unburied men

That do corrupt my air, I banish you;

And here remain with your uncertainty!

Let every feeble rumour shake your hearts,

Your enemies, with nodding of their plumes! (points to ARAMINTA'S shaking head and fan),

Fan you into despair!

Despising, for you, the City, thus I turn my back:

There is a world elsewhere." (snaps his fingers end lifts his foot as if in a contemptuous kick. Up to R. U. E., tears down curtain of R. U. E., so that it enwraps him like a mantle, and rushes off R.U.E)

== Novel ==
According to several sources, Robertson originally fashioned the story as a novel, David Garrick: A Love Story, which was first printed in 1864 as a serial in the magazine The Young Englishwoman. However, in the 1865 printing in book form, Robertson says in his preface that it was the other way around, and his novel was adapted from his play.

While the plots are virtually identical, the tone of the novelisation is much more sentimental and sombre. In the play, however, the wedding between Ada and Chivy is called off after Chivy openly races off in pursuit of Garrick's housemaid and carelessly leaves out embarrassing love letters sent between himself and other women, the novel shows the wedding cancelled when it is revealed that Chivy (called Raubreyne in the book) has an illegitimate child with a woman he has falsely promised to marry; and even then, Ada is only permitted to marry Garrick after "dying of love" leaves her otherwise incurably bedridden for several months. The element of the duel is also removed from the novel. In the introduction to the 2009 reprint, it is speculated that the "less farcical tone" may have more closely resembled Robertson's early drafts of the play, before Sothern's contributions.

While much of the humour was removed in the novelisation, a great deal of exposition was added, and the story begins on the day Garrick and Ada first meet. Many of the characters' names were altered from the play. Simon Ingot becomes Alderman Trawley, Richard Chivy becomes Robert Raubreyne, "Sawney" Smith becomes "Sammy" Smith, and Ada Ingot becomes Ada Trawley.
