= Antonio Cabral Bejarano =

19th-century Spanish painter

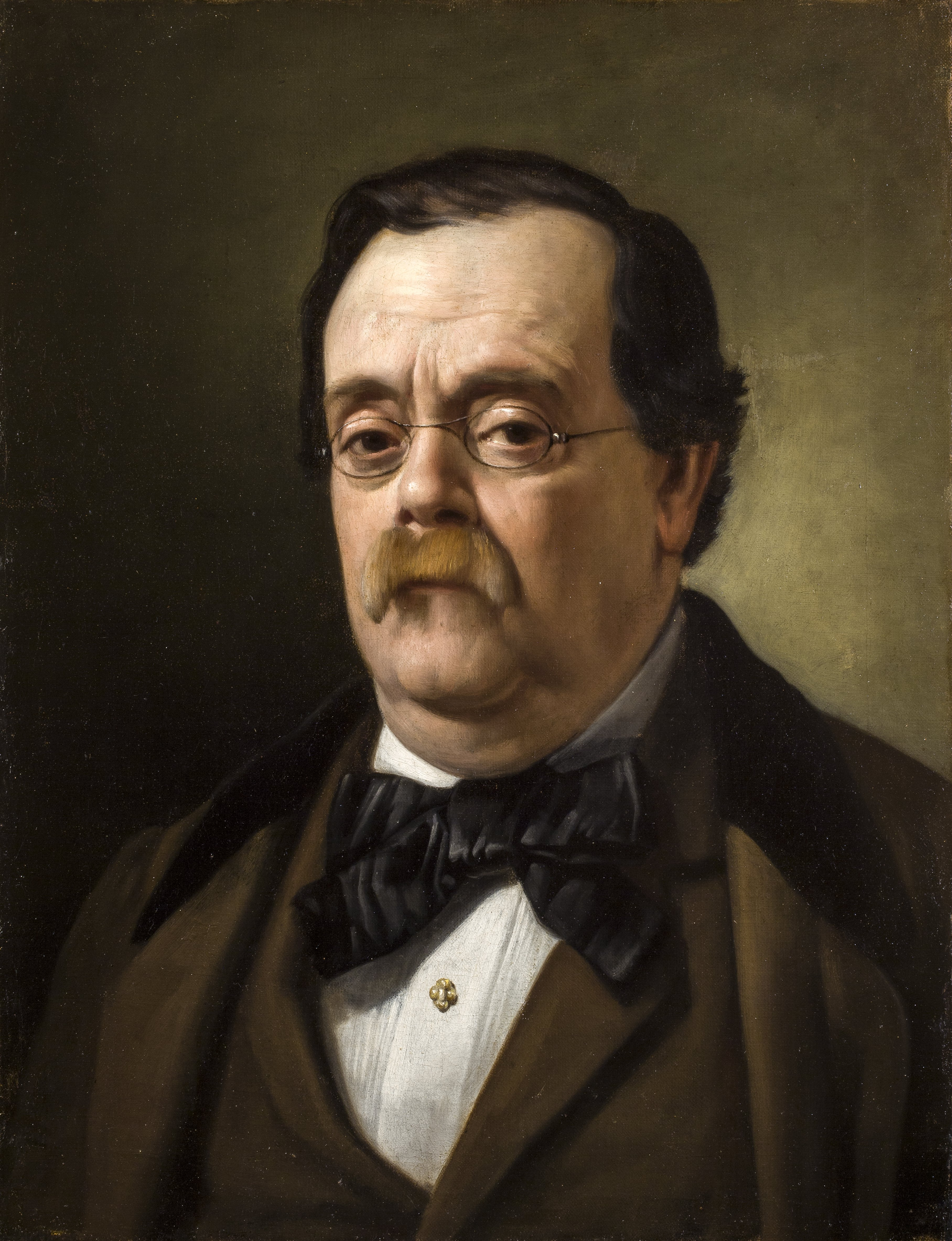
- Self-Portrait (1851)
- Born: Antonio Joaquín María de Todos los Santos Ignacio de Loyola Quintín; 31 October 1798; Seville, Spain
- Died: 1 August 1861 (aged 62); Seville, Spain
- Education: Joaquin Cabral Bejarano (his father)
- Known for: Painting
- Movement: Romantic painting Costumbrismo
- Patrons: City Council of Seville, Duke of Montpensier

Antonio Cabral Bejarano (31 October 1798 – 1 August 1861) was a Spanish painter, considered to be an adherent of both the Europe-wide Romantic painting and the specifically Hispanic painting school of Costumbrismo. His ancestors for several earlier generations were painters, and he was initially trained by his father. He was mainly active in his native city of Seville, getting many commissions from its municipal government. He was the first Director of the Museum of Fine Arts of Seville.

== Early life ==
He was born in Seville. His great-grandfather was the painter Diego Bejarano. He had a daughter named Maria Bejarano, who married Pedro Cabral. From this marriage was born the painter Joaquin Cabral Bejarano, a well-known painter of neoclassic style. In 1785 Joaquín married Escolástica Pérez Junquitu Fernández. It was of this marriage that Antonio Cabral Bejarano was born in 1798. Being baptized in the church of San Pedro as Antonio Joaquín María de Todos los Santos Ignacio de Loyola Quintín, he would later renounce his maternal surnames, to use only those of his father.

== Career ==
He received art training from his father. In 1812, after French invaders were forced to evacuate Seville, classes resumed at la Escuela de Tres Nobles Artes (School of Three Noble Arts) and Antonio Cabral entered as a student. In 1814 he collaborated with his father in the decoration of the convent of the Trinity and, in 1816, in the decoration of the General Archive of the Indies, which at the time was also a consular court. This decoration of the Archive of the Indies was made on the occasion of the passage through the city of the Portuguese precesses María Isabel de Braganza and Francisca de Braganza, on their way to Madrid to marry, respectively, King Fernando VII and his brother Carlos María Isidro .

In 1819 he helped to build a funeral catafalque in the Cathedral of Seville in memory of the same Maria Isabel de Braganza, who died in childbirth after two years of marriage. He also made an engraving showing the catafalque for the cover of a book on the event. In 1820 he designed for the city council of Seville the decoration of a monument commemorating the Constitution of 1812.

In 1825 he was appointed Assistant Professor of Perspective at the School of Three Noble Arts. In 1829, the City Council of Seville commissioned the construction of the "Temple of Himeneo" in the Plaza de la Encarnación, to commemorate the marriage between Fernando VII and María Cristina de Borbón.

In 1835 he was given an appointment at the San Fernando Royal Academy of Fine Arts in Madrid, in appreciation of his painting "The Decapitation of St. John the Baptist."

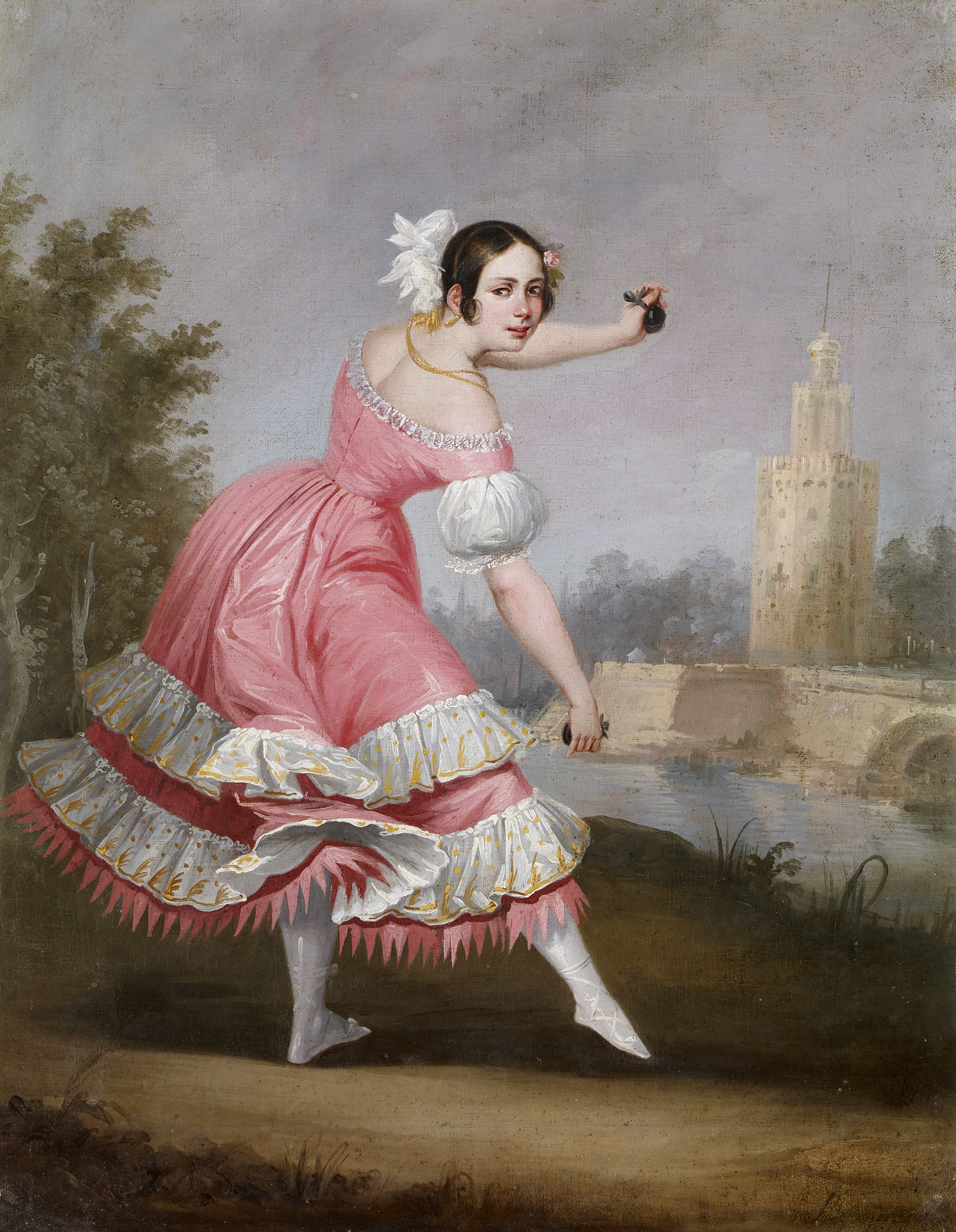
Antonio Cabral Bejarano, A Bolero dancer. 1842. Carmen Thyssen Museum, Málaga

In 1837 he was appointed member of the management committee of the newly created Museum of Fine Arts in Seville. In 1838 the Liceo de Sevilla was founded, and he participated in the organization of various acts and exhibitions. In 1839, the Seville City Council commissioned from him an ephemeral monument, the "Temple of the Peace ", to commemorate the Peace of Vergara, by which the Carlist War was ended.

In 1840 he was appointed as the first Director of the Museum of Fine Arts of Seville.

In 1846 he designed decoration added to the facade of the Civil Government building on the occasion of the wedding of Isabel II and Luisa Fernanda, with the Duke of Cádiz and the Duke of Montpensier respectively. Also in 1846 he designed the facade of the Theater of the Passion, which was located on the street of the same name. In 1847 he painted the stage decorations and the roofs of the San Fernando Theater.

In 1850 he was appointed director of the School of Fine Arts in Seville. Between 1850 and 1857 he made several works for the Duke of Montpensier. Among these works are the paintings of the chapel of the Palace of San Telmo, acquired by the Duke at that time, as well as the portraits of illustrious Sevillians. He was succeeded as a painter in this palace by Joaquín Domínguez Bécquer.

In July 1853 there was a scandal when he was accused of having sold off fifty paintings belonging to the Museum of Fine Arts. As a result, he was dismissed as director. He was readmitted in September, when he reinstated the fifty paintings.

== Family ==
In 1823 he married Francisca de Paula Aguado Pacheco. From this marriage were born the children Francisco in 1824, Jose Maria in 1826, Manuel in 1827, Carlota in 1829, María Dolores in 1832, Juan Antonio in 1834, Rafael in 1837, María Aurora in 1838 and Luisa in 1840. All these children used the surnames Cabral Bejarano. Several of them would become painters in their turn.

== Death ==
He died in Seville, aged 62.

== Sources ==
- Enrique Valdivieso, "Antonio Cabral Bejarano", published by Servicio de Publicaciones de la Diputación de Sevilla, 2014, ISBN 978-84-7798-350-7
- Romanticismo 6. Actas del VI Congreso. El costumbrismo romántico Romanticismo 6. Actas del VI Congreso Antonio Reina Palazón, El costumbrismo en la pintura sevillana del siglo XIX, El costumbrismo romántico, 1996, p. 265-274, ISBN 8883190157.
- Gonzalo Martínez y Enrique Valdivieso, "Presupuestos e informes de Antonio Cabral Bejarano para la decoración pictórica de la capilla del palacio de San Telmo", published by Laboratorio de Arte. Revista del Departamento de Historia del Arte, no. 25. 2013, p. 915-928, ISSN 1130-5762.
