= Monde dramatique =

Le Monde Dramatique was a periodical published in Paris, France, from May 1835 to September 1841. It was founded by Gérard de Nerval and Anatole Bouchardy. The short-lived magazine was "overly ambitious and poorly managed", consisting mostly of unsigned articles reviewing or commenting upon the theater. It also included some early writings of Anatole's brother Joseph Bouchardy, who would later go on to a successful career as a playwright.
