= Añover de Tajo =

Coordinates: 39°59′N 3°46′W

- municipality
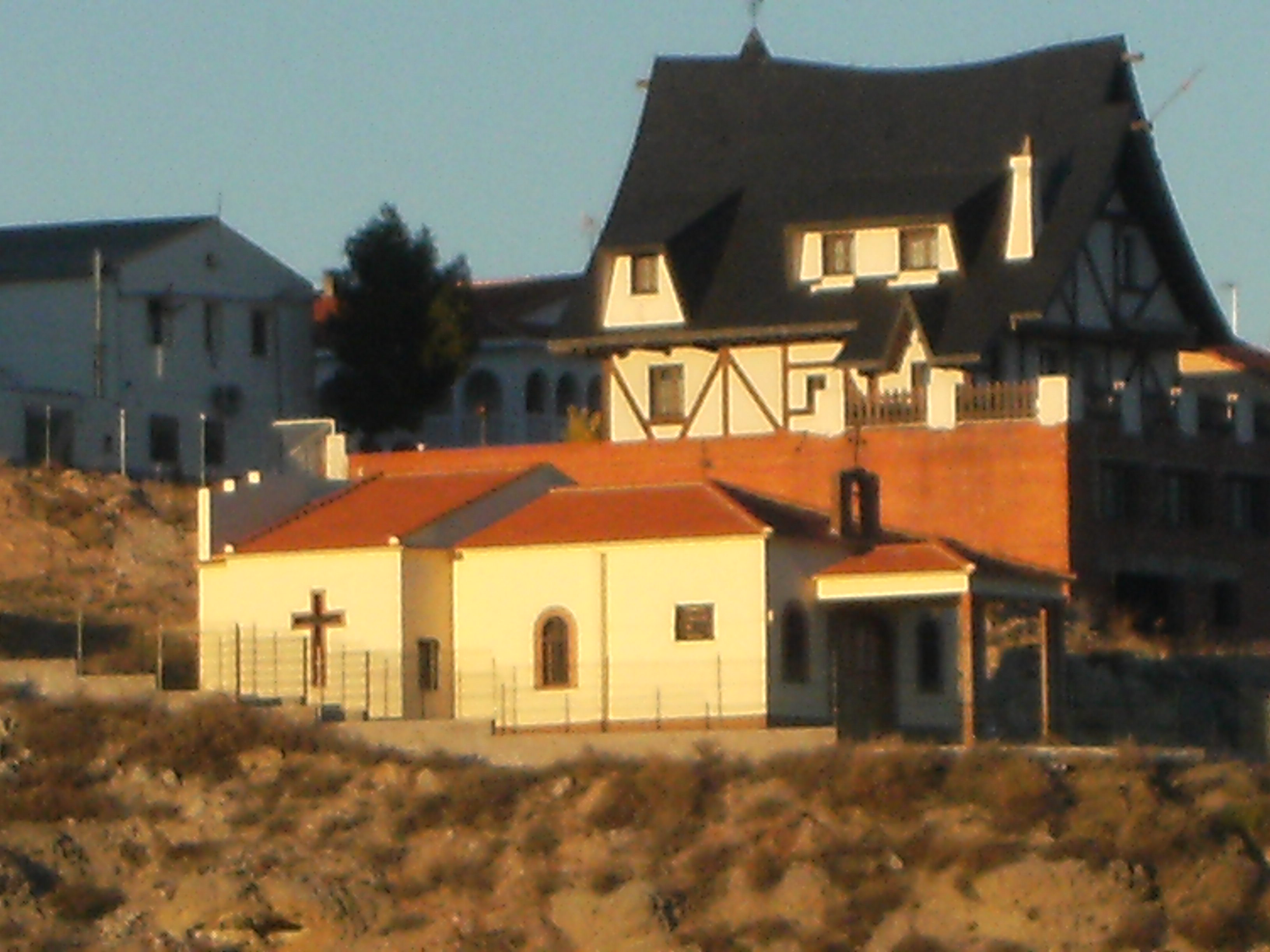
- Flag Coat of arms
- Interactive map of Añover de Tajo
- Country: Spain
- Autonomous community: Castile-La Mancha
- Province: Toledo
- Municipality: Añover de Tajo

Area
  - Total: 40 km^{2} (15 sq mi)
- Elevation: 540 m (1,770 ft)

Population (2025-01-01)
  - Total: 5,454
  - Density: 140/km^{2} (350/sq mi)
- Time zone: UTC+1 (CET)
  - Summer (DST): UTC+2 (CEST)

Añover de Tajo is a municipality located in the province of Toledo, Castile-La Mancha, Spain. According to the 2006 census (INE), the municipality has a population of 5095 inhabitants.

== Demographics ==
Historical population
Year	Pop.	±%
1900	2,630	—
1910	2,634	+0.2%
1920	2,976	+13.0%
1930	3,396	+14.1%
1940	2,662	−21.6%
1950	3,279	+23.2%
1960	3,712	+13.2%
1970	4,339	+16.9%
1981	4,290	−1.1%
1991	4,401	+2.6%
2001	4,565	+3.7%
2011	5,412	+18.6%
2021	5,202	−3.9%
2023	5,215	+0.2%
Source: INE

== Notable people ==
- Jerónima Llorente (1793-1848), actress
