= Fortunio (novel) =

1837 novel by Théophile Gautier

- Author: Théophile Gautier
- Original title: L'Eldorado, ou Fortunio
- Translator: F. C. de Sumichrast
- Language: French; English
- Genre: Romantic Fantasy
- Published: Serialised May 1837 – July 1837; book format 1838
- Published in: Le Figaro
- Publication date: May 1837
- Publication place: France
- English publication date: 1907

Fortunio is a novel by the French writer Théophile Gautier, first published under the name L'Eldorado, ou Fortunio and serialised in the newspaper Le Figaro from 28 May 28 to 14 July 1837. It was compiled and published as a book with the title Fortunio in 1838. It deals with Orientalist themes, and satirises wealth, worldliness, and idleness. It has been characterised as absurdist, eccentric, and Decadent, and is a Romantic fantasy. Gautier considered the novel to be "his last expression of a 'doctrine' " concerning artistic creation.

== Plot summary ==
The novel opens with a dinner party, which has been referred to as an "orgy" by some critics. The reader is introduced to George, the host, as well as the women Musidora, Arabella, Phoebe, and Cynthia. The mysterious Fortunio was invited, but is nowhere to be seen, and gossip abounds. Musidora's interest is piqued, and she makes a bet with George that she will get Fortunio to fall in love with her within six weeks. Fortunio finally arrives, and ignores her the entire night. Musidora steals his purse and takes it home in despair. Musidora's servants, Jacinthe and Jack, as well as her white cat, are introduced as she struggles to get the purse open. She loses faith in the bet and falls in love with Fortunio in short order, but upon opening the purse finds a letter she cannot read and a strange needle. She decides to hunt down someone who can read the letter, and goes with Arabella to the houses of renowned professors of language. They are unsuccessful, and eventually track down an Indian man on the street who translates it as part of a poem.

Upon her return home, she receives a letter from Fortunio informing her that she may keep the purse, and warning her that the needle is poisoned. She is angered that her theft has not produced an emotional reaction, and loses the will to live. A visit from George prompts her to go looking for Fortunio in the city, but to no avail. She returns, loses the will to live again, and plans to commit suicide by needle shortly before noon. She tests the poison on her white cat, and finds that it is a graceful death. A few minutes before noon, she receives another letter from Fortunio, summoning her to his home. She happily goes. Jack and Jacinthe find the cat shortly after, and worry about the consequences of letting it die.

Musidora and Fortunio have a rendezvous, complete with a tiger, and Fortunio decides that he has fallen in love with her. They stay together for a while. During a night that they are spending at Musidora's house, Musidora wakes up to smoke and fire, and Fortunio takes her out of the house. He admits to setting the fire, and to extreme jealousy that made him hate anything that he had not given her himself. Anything that predated their relationship needed to go. He buys a new house for her, and she accepts his jealousy and feelings.

Eventually, Fortunio begins to leave her alone for periods of time without telling her where he went. His true home in Paris is introduced: Eldorado, which he hollowed out of a block of townhouses and filled with an Indian hothouse environment and servant girls. His favourite, Soudja-Sara, is a young Indonesian girl whom he has trained as a courtesan to care about him above all else. None of the servants who live within Eldorado has any idea that they are in Paris, or indeed what Paris even is. When Fortunio leaves, they expect that he is off hunting tigers.

Fortunio has decided that his jealousy for Musidora is too consuming, and that they would both be better off without the relationship. He writes her a letter in the guise of someone else, informing her that he has died. She will receive an annual income ever after. Musidora immediately goes to the old pouch and pricks herself with the poisoned needle, committing suicide.

Fortunio returns to India, and writes a letter explaining his distaste for Paris and its culture and customs, which are so strange to him.

== Themes ==
Fortunio is full of "absurdities and extravagances" and wholly without "dramatic force and effect." Gautier relies on descriptive language, especially concerning the physical features, bodies, and clothing of characters. The settings are also sumptuously described and attired. Both men and women are reduced to their beauty, or lack of it, but the women especially are described as either doll-like or passionate, depending on the plot point. All of the main characters are described as extremely perfect physically, and differ only in personality. However, this would seem to be at least partially satirical, as Musidora's described traits are contradictory - she has blue eyes, she has green eyes; her hair is straight, her hair is perfectly wavy. Musidora's life and actions especially revolve around Fortunio, and she is not shown to have any other thoughts. However, the same could be said for every other character in the novel – Musidora is simply one of the main characters, and exhibits the trait most obviously.

Fashion, textiles, and furniture are important to the narrator, and are carefully described at the beginning of every scene. He pointedly says that he dislikes modern men's fashion. One professor is described as wearing a wig, an item which went out of fashion decades previous, and Musidora at one point goes without a corset. Fabrics are mentioned to have come from all around the world, and very often allusions to classical tales or historical art are used as metaphor.

Fortunio is an Orientalist story, full of mystery and romance concerning the East. Treasures and customs are often mentioned, and much of Fortunio's mystery comes from his not being raised in Paris, and cannot be pinned down in the way that the Parisians are accustomed to. Exoticism and mystery are frequently occurring themes.

Fortunio himself was raised with immense wealth and no restrictions, and much is made of his behaviour and personality. It is noted that rich men have no cares for the law, but Fortunio does not do anything that the narrator himself considers immoral until he burns down Musidora's house.

== French editions (partial list) ==
- 1837 The El Dorado, "Publications of the Figaro"
- 1838 Fortunio, published by Desessart
- 1840 Fortunio, published by Delloye
- 1842 Fortunio or the Eldorado, published by Desessart
- 1934 Fortunio, illustrated by Paul-Émile Bécat, published by Georges Briffaut
- Fortunio was also illustrated by Gerda Wegener in the 1920s
- More recently it has been published in paperback, notably by Gallimard (Folio Classique) and by Garnier (Classique Garnier).
