= Matilde Diez =

Spanish theater actress

Matilda Diez
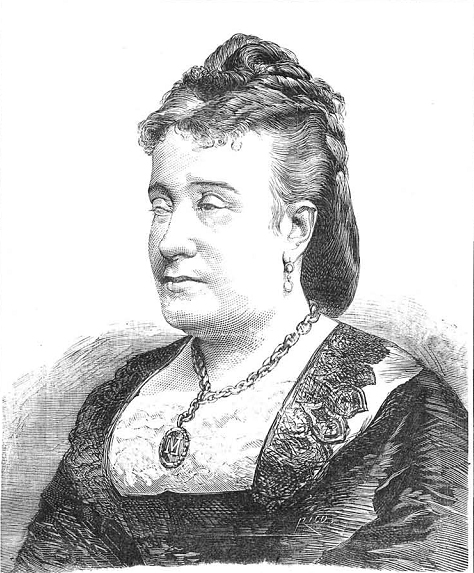
- Born: 20 February 1818; Madrid, Spain
- Died: 16 January 1883 (aged 64); Madrid, Spain
- Burial place: Cemetery of San Nicolás
- Occupation: Actress
- Spouse: Julian Romea (m. 1836)

Matilde Diez (20 February 1818 – 16 January 1883) was a Spanish theater actress.

== Biography ==
Diez was born in Madrid, and began acting when she was twelve years old with the play La huérfana de Bruxelles, performed at the Teatro de Cádiz. In 1834 the theater impresario Juan Grimaldi hired her to work in Madrid in the play Clotilde, by Federico Soulié.

In 1836, she married the actor Julián Romea. Together they performed numerous plays at the Teatro Español, such as Gabriela de Belle-Isle and the first performance of a play by William Shakespeare directly translated from English: Macbeth, in 1838 at the Teatro del Príncipe.

After that, she worked in dozens of performances, such as Catalina Howard, The Lovers of Teruel, The Duende lady, The game is on between fools, Mother's Love, Storms of the heart, The braid of her hair, and The Governess.

Between 1853 and 1858 she moved to America, working in Mexico City and Havana. In her last years she taught at the Madrid Conservatory of Music and Declamation. Notable among her public recognitions is her appointment as the first camera actress by Queen Elizabeth II.

She died at the beginning of 1883 and was buried in the cemetery of San Nicolás. Her remains are found in a pantheon in the cemetery of San Lorenzo and San José in Madrid.

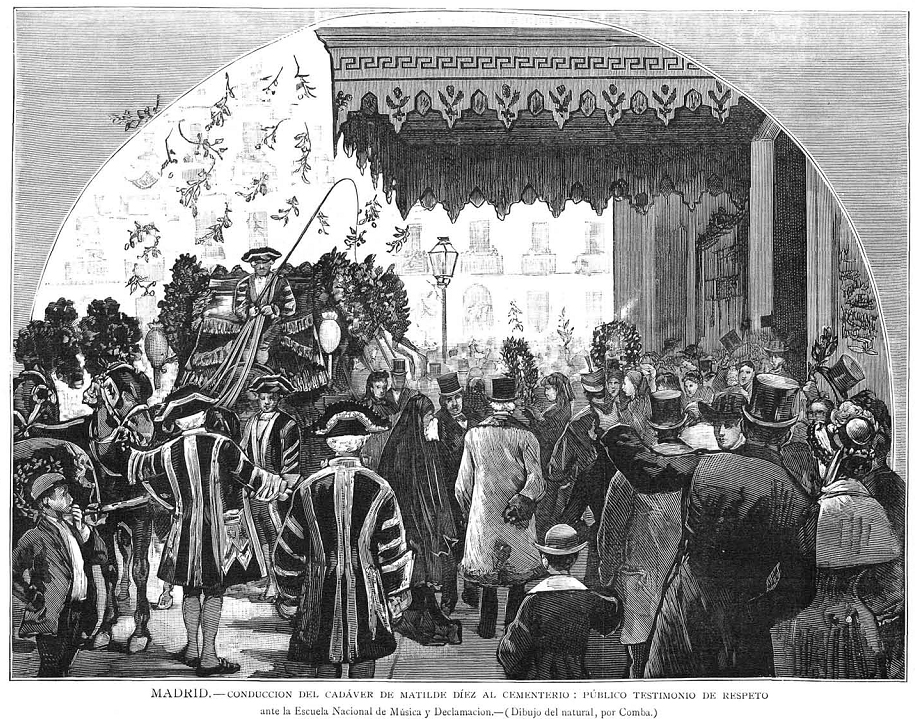
Driving the corpse of Matilde Diez to the cemetery, drawing by Juan Comba in The Spanish and American Illustration
