= Philothée O'Neddy =

French poet

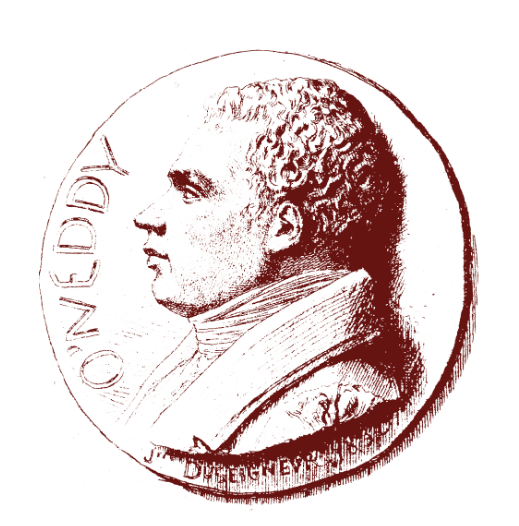
- Born: Théophile Auguste Marie Dondey de Santeny; 1811; Paris, France
- Died: 1875 (aged 63–64); Paris, France
- Education: Lycée Louis-Le-Grand
- Occupation: Poet

Philothée O'Neddy (1811, Paris -1875, Paris), born Théophile Auguste Marie Dondey de Santeny, was a French poet. He was an associate of the Romantic movement, and one of the original "Bohemians". He is known for his 1831 collection Feu et flamme. He also wrote fiction, such as Histoire d'un anneau enchanté (1842).

== Life and career ==
O'Neddy was born in 1811 in Paris. He studied at the Lycée Louis-Le-Grand.
