= Julián Romea =

Spanish theater actor and writer

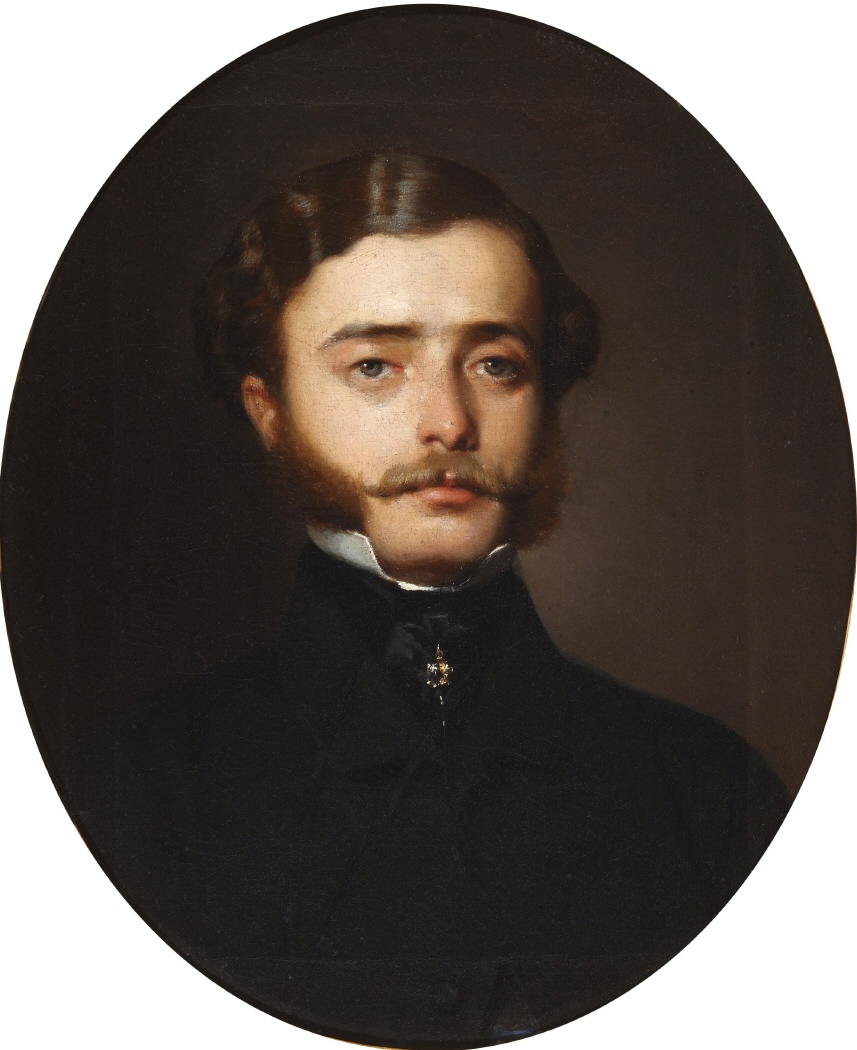
Portrait of Julian Romea by Federio de Madrazo in the Museum of Romanticism (Madrid)

Julián Romea Yanguas (Murcia, February 16, 1813 – Loeches, August 10, 1868) was a Spanish theater actor and writer. He heads a theatrical dynasty that also includes his nephew Julián Romea Parra and his son Alberto Romea Catalina.

== Biography ==
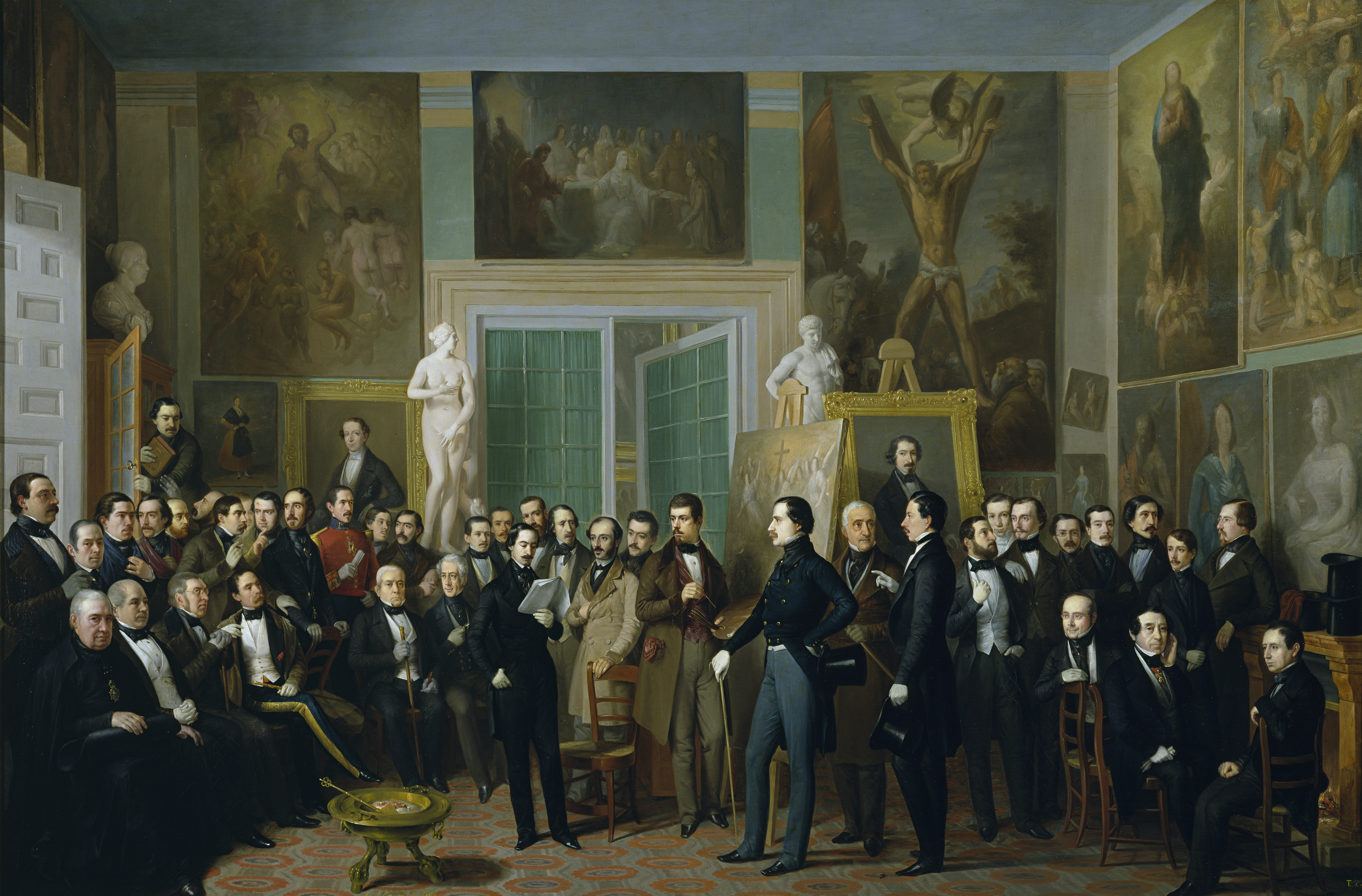
Julian Romea portrayed in Contemporary Poets by Antonio Maria Esquivel, 1846, Prado Museum, Madrid. He is standing, in profile, in a central position, with a cane and a white glove.

Born in the Plaza de Santa Catalina, in the Murcian capital, Julián was the second of the six children of Mariano Romea y Bayona, an Aragonese who administered the assets of the Marquises of Espinardo in Murcia, and of Ignacia Yanguas and Prat de Rivera, a Valencian based in Madrid. In 1816 he moved with his family to Alcalá de Henares, but when his father was banished for his liberal past and fled to Portugal, his mother returned to Murcia with her children in 1823; there the young Romea studied the humanities at the Major Seminary of San Fulgencio; by then he already intervened as an actor in amateur pieces. At the end of 1827 the father returned from exile. In 1831 they returned to Madrid and Julián enrolled in the newly created School of Music and Declamatory Art, where he was taught by the great actor Carlos Latorre, a disciple of Isidoro Máiquez; he also became a professor at this School, popularly known as The Conservatory. In 1832 he was hired as a young leading man by the Juan Grimaldi Company and was an actor at the Teatro del Principe, on whose stage he starred in the first performance of a play by William Shakespeare directly translated from English: Macbeth, in 1838.

In 1839, together with his sister Florencia and his wife, Matilde Díez, he promoted the construction of a monument in Granada to commemorate the great actor Isidoro Maiquéz who would die in this city in 1820.

In 1839 he challenged the theater critic Ignacio Escobar to a duel with pistols for a bad review, although as both of them were lousy shooters their shots missed; however, Romea's stray bullet killed one of his godfathers, a truly grotesque tragedy, but in keeping with those times. He wrote a Declamation Manual (1858) and also a handful of plays, among which Ricardo stands out, and also cultivated poetry, although he was not esteemed as he deserved in this field, perhaps for having extinguished his theatrical fame that he achieved in this field. He collaborated in the magazine El Artista, of notable importance for Spanish romantic literature, and was a regular at the gathering known as El Parnasillo. Other collaborators of this magazine were Eugenio de Ochoa, Federico and Pedro de Madrazo, Fernán Caballero, Manuel Bretón de los Herreros, Patricio de la Escosura, Juan Nicasio Gallego, Alberto Lista, Gabriel García Tassara, José Espronceda, José Zorrilla, Nicomedes Pastor Díaz, Mariano Roca de Togores, Maury and Ventura de la Vega, that is to say, many of the names that were to make up the main staff of Spanish Romanticism. Married in 1836 with the actress Matilde Díez, they had a son, Alfredo, in December 1837. The marriage, however, was far from well-matched and the following years were spent apart; Julián became a professor at the Conservatory, an academician at the Royal Seville Academy of Good Letters in Seville, and a cross in the Order of Carlos III. In 1846 he published Poesías de don Julián Romea, reprinted in Seville (1861). A year earlier he had obtained an honorable mention from the Royal Spanish Academy for his ode to the war in Africa.

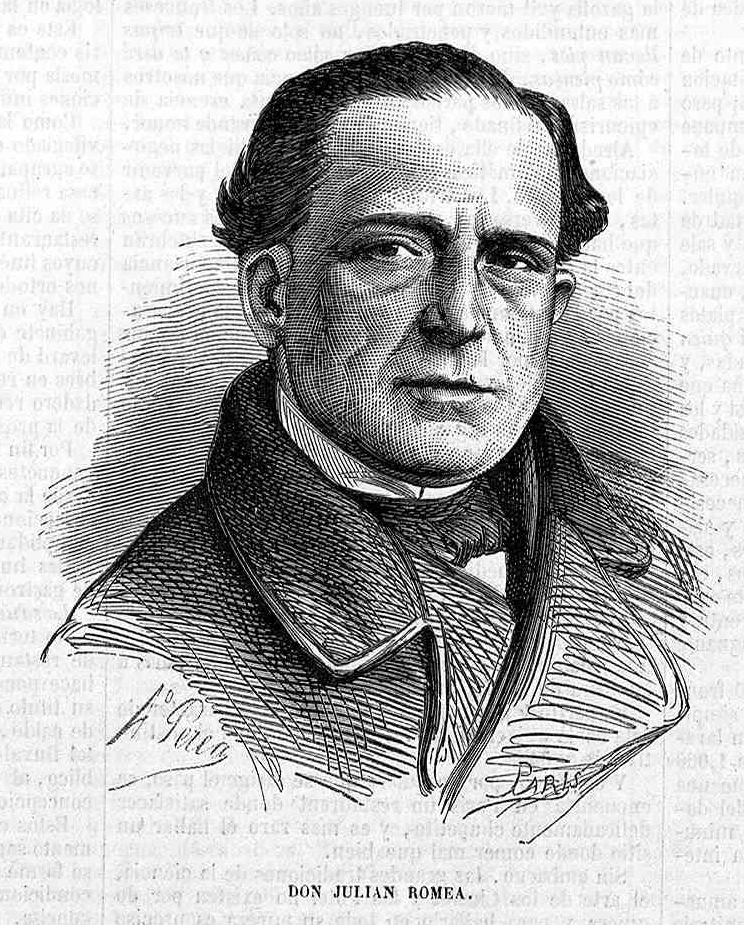
Portrait of Julian Romea, drawing by A. Perea and engraing of Paris (El Museo Universal, 1866)

Replacing Grimaldi at the end of 1840, he directed the Teatro del Príncipe in Madrid, which he completely refurbished, modernizing the lighting and stalls, and thanks to his efforts, Juan Eugenio Hartzenbusch was able to premiere The Lovers of Teruel on January 19, 1837, in a function for the benefit of the first actor Carlos Latorre and with the participation of others equally famous, such as Bárbara Lamadrid and Julián Romea himself. The performance was an unspeakable success with the public and critics, and placed the author and actors at the top of popularity. The separation of the Romea-Díez couple was consummated when she enrolled in the company of Manuel Catalina, with which he toured America for more than five years, from 1853 to 1859. In 1865, Queen Elizabeth II appointed him – already suffering from severe coronary insufficiency– director of the Conservatory, replacing his great friend Ventura de la Vega. Julián and Matilde rest together in the sacramental cemetery of San Lorenzo and San José, in Madrid.

Romea welcomed in his verses all the themes of Romanticism, but in the happiest moments he has his own accents and preferential and characteristic reasons for inspiration, which make up his personality. And as the famous romantic actor said: “When from the eternal night / in the lost immensity / the wind of oblivion passes / for my hope and my love, / I only ask you, because you were / the light of my life, my glory / a I sigh to my memory, / and to my grave, a flower.”

He stood out for his naturalness and good taste in declamation. He was considered one of the greatest glories of the national theater. His portrait is kept in the Almagro Theater Museum (Ciudad Real) and the Romea Theater in Murcia, and the Theater of the Provinces in Barcelona bear his name as a tribute.

== Works ==
- To the African War (1845)
- Poems of don Julian Romea (1846; reprinted in 1861)
- General Ideas on the Art of the Theater (1858)
- Declamation Manual for the use of the students of the Royal Conservatory of Madrid (1859)
- The Heroes of the Theater (1866)
- Letters with Ventura de la Vega
- Richard

== Bibliography ==
- Brief portrait of Julian Romea
