= Joseph Bouchardy =

Joseph Bouchardy (1810–1870) was an author, playwright, engraver, and member of the Jeune France/Bouzingo and Cénacle movements. The enormous popularity of his plays earned him the nickname "The King of the Boulevard." In 1868 he was given the rank of chevalier from the Legion d'Honneur. He is the brother of Anatole Bouchardy.

According to Théophile Gautier, he died unhappily: "He had become a gaunt old man, broken, destroyed by grief, and by the sadness of authors who have experienced the intoxication of success, and whose popularity retires without being able to appreciate the reasons why it went away."

== Bibliography ==
- http://bouzingo.blogspot.com/p/timeline.html
- http://www.sylvie-lecuyer.net/lepetitcenacle.html
- http://oxfordindex.oup.com/view/10.1093/oi/authority.20110803095520411
