= Théophile Gautier =

French poet, dramatist and novelist (1811–1872)

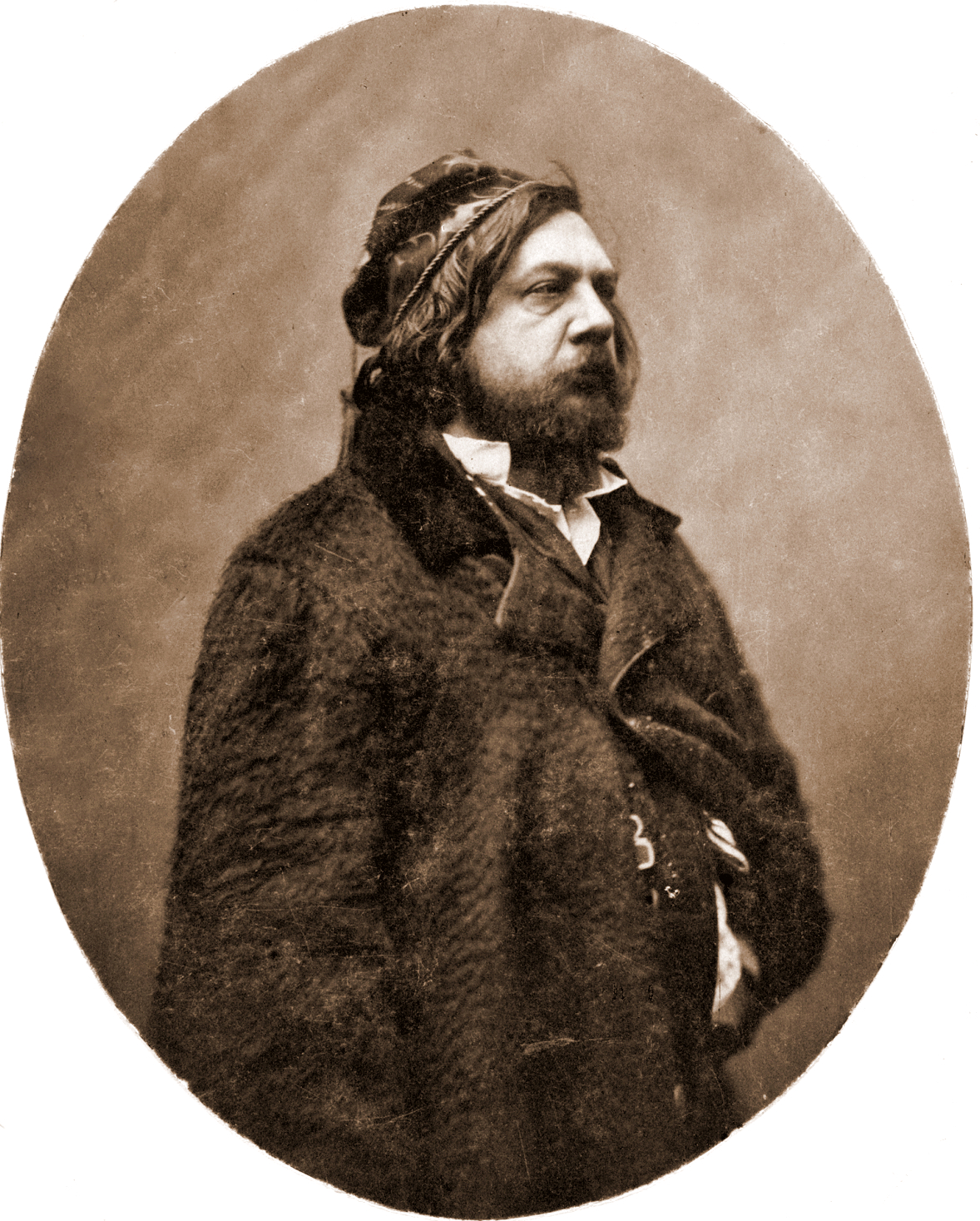
- Théophile Gautier photographed by Nadar
- Born: Jules Théophile Gautier; 30 August 1811; Tarbes, France
- Died: 23 October 1872 (aged 61); Neuilly-sur-Seine, France
- Resting place: Cimetière de Montmartre
- Occupations: Writer, poet, painter, art critic
- Writing career
- Years active: 1826−1872
- Movements: Parnassianism, Romanticism

Signature
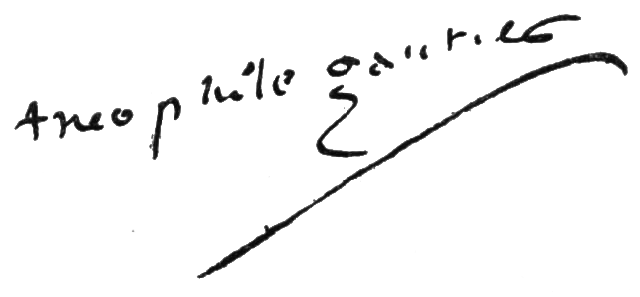

Pierre Jules Théophile Gautier (US: /ɡoʊˈtjeɪ/ goh-TYAY; French: [pjɛʁ ʒyl teɔfil ɡotje]; 30 August 1811 – 23 October 1872) was a French poet, dramatist, novelist, journalist, and art and literary critic.

While an ardent defender of Romanticism, Gautier's work is difficult to classify and remains a point of reference for many subsequent literary traditions such as Parnassianism, Symbolism, Decadence and Modernism. He was widely esteemed by writers as disparate as Balzac, Baudelaire, the Goncourt brothers, Flaubert, Pound, Eliot, James, Proust and Wilde.

== Life and times ==
Gautier was born on 30 August 1811 in Tarbes, capital of Hautes-Pyrénées département (southwestern France). His father was Jean-Pierre Gautier, a fairly cultured minor government official, and his mother was Antoinette-Adelaïde Cocard. The family moved to Paris in 1814, taking up residence in the ancient Marais district.

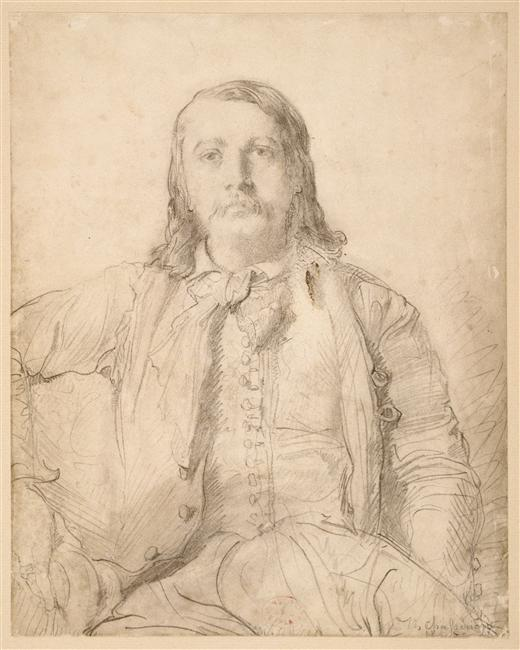
Portrait of Théophile Gautier by Théodore Chassériau (Musée du Louvre)

Gautier's education commenced at the prestigious Collège Louis-le-Grand in Paris, which he attended for three months before being brought home due to illness. Although he completed the remainder of his education at Collège Charlemagne, Gautier's most significant instruction, including in Latin, came from his father.

While at school, Gautier befriended Gérard de Nerval and the two became lifelong friends. It is through Nerval that Gautier was introduced to Victor Hugo, by then already a leading dramatist. Hugo became a major influence on Gautier. It was at the legendary premiere of Hugo's Hernani that Gautier is remembered for wearing his anachronistic red doublet.

In the aftermath of the 1830 Revolution, Gautier's family experienced hardship and was forced to move to the outskirts of Paris. Deciding to experiment with his own independence and freedom, Gautier chose to stay with friends in the Doyenné district of Paris.

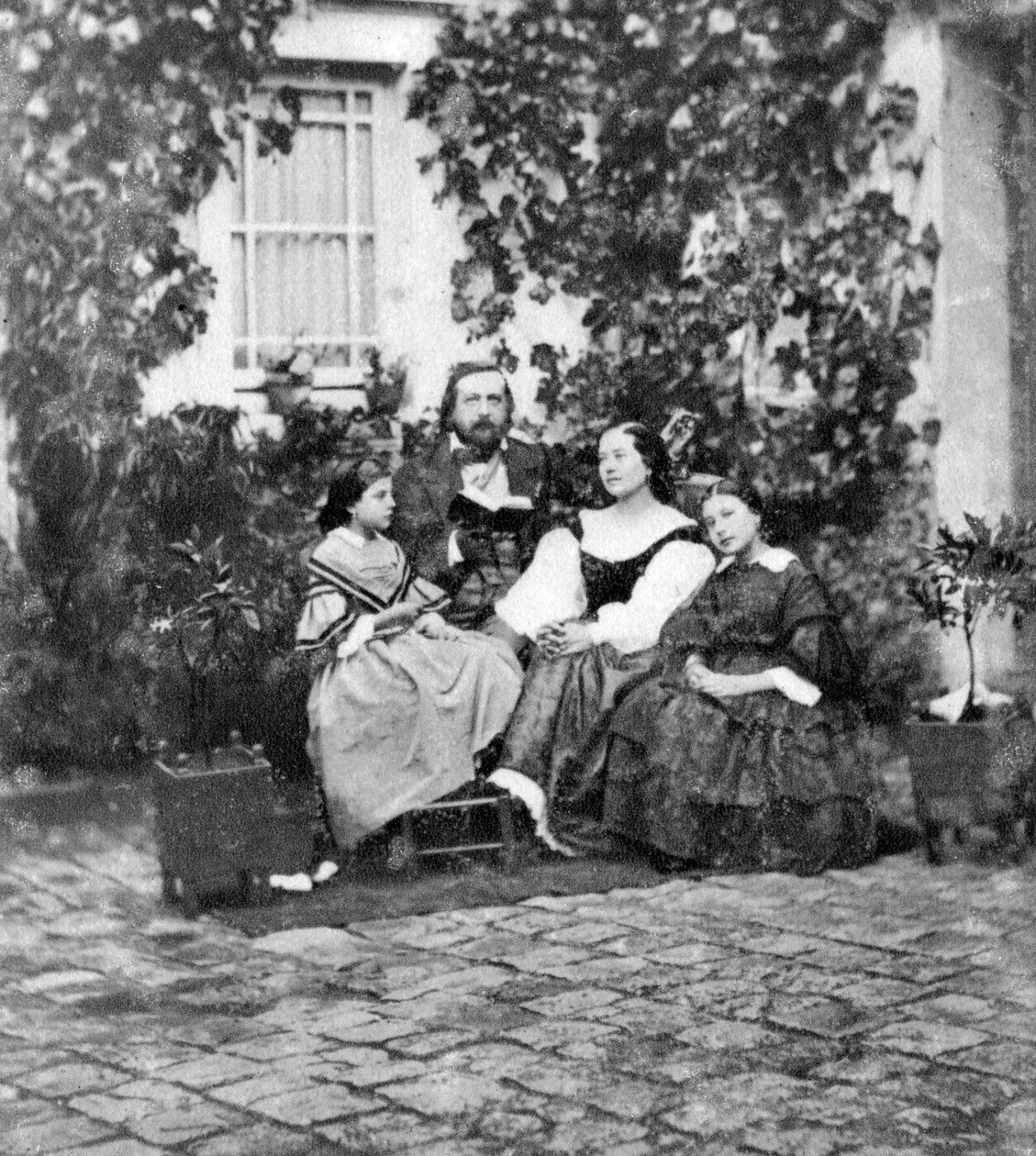
Gautier with Ernestina Grisi and their daughters Estelle and Judith. Photograph taken around 1857.

Towards the end of 1830, Gautier began to frequent meetings of Le Petit Cénacle (The Little Art Circle), a group of artists who met in the studio of Jehan Duseigneur. The group was a more irresponsible version of Hugo's Cénacle. Among its members were the artists Gérard de Nerval, Alexandre Dumas père, Petrus Borel, Alphonse Brot, and Philothée O'Neddy. Le Petit Cénacle soon gained a reputation for extravagance and eccentricity.

Gautier began writing poetry as early as 1826, but the majority of his life was spent as a contributor to various journals, mainly La Presse, which also gave him the opportunity for foreign travel and for meeting many influential contacts in high society and the world of the arts. Throughout his life, Gautier was well-travelled, taking trips to Spain, Italy, Russia, Egypt and Algeria. Gautier's many travels inspired many of his writings including Voyage en Espagne (1843), Trésors d'Art de la Russie (1858), and Voyage en Russie (1867). Gautier's travel literature is considered by many as being some of the best from the nineteenth century; often written in a personal style, it provides a window into Gautier's own tastes in art and culture.

Gautier was a celebrated abandonné (one who yields or abandons himself to something) of the Romantic Ballet, writing several scenarios, the most famous of which is Giselle, whose first interpreter, the ballerina Carlotta Grisi, was the great love of his life. When Carlotta rebuffed him, he began a long-term relationship and had two daughters with her sister Ernestina, a singer.

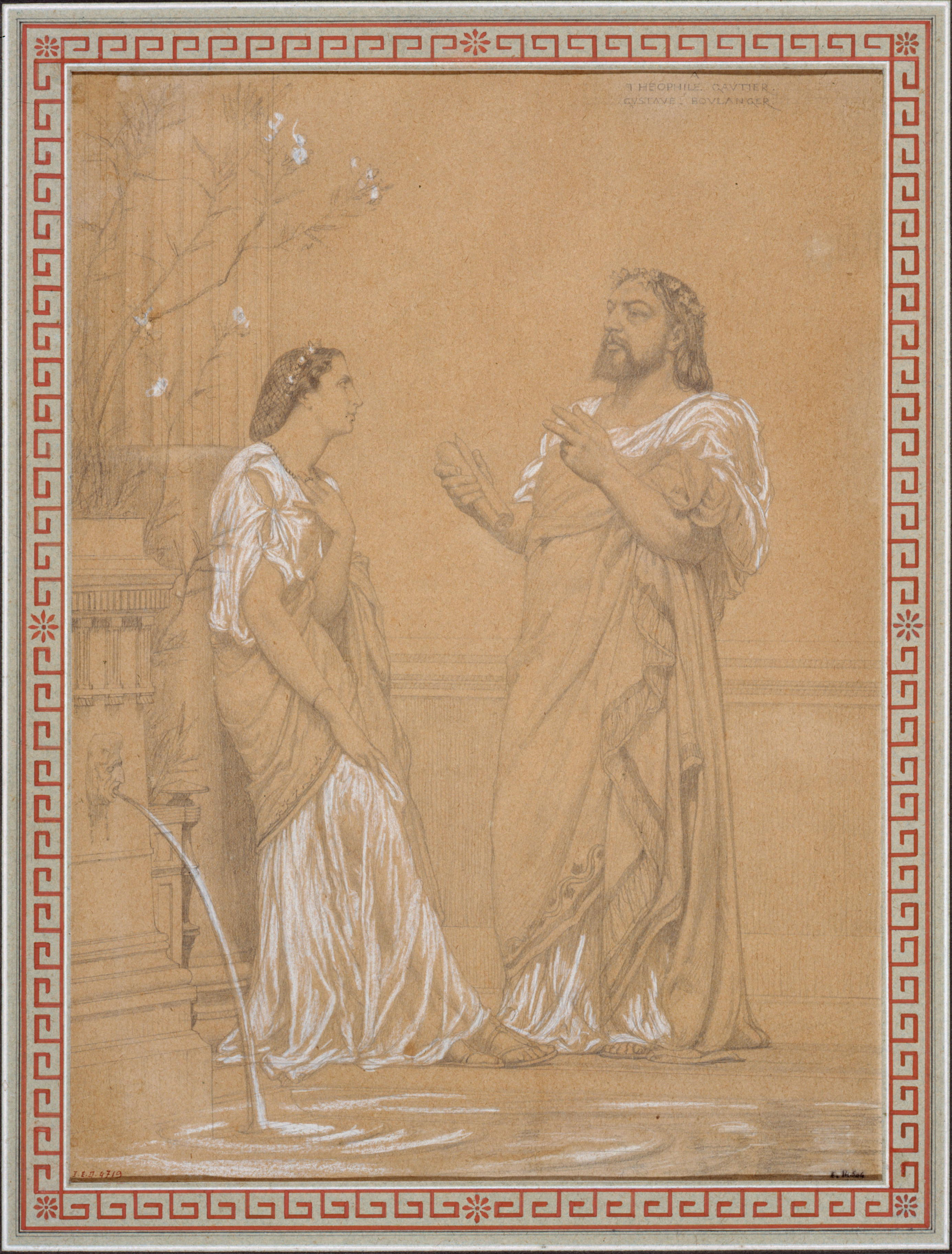
Gustave Boulanger, Théophile Gautier and Marie Favart in Roman costumes, 1861, a study for Boulanger's painting Répétition du "Joueur de flûte" et de "La femme de Diomède" chez le prince Napoléon

Absorbed by the 1848 Revolution, Gautier wrote almost one hundred articles, equivalent to four large books, within nine months in 1848. In his essay La République de l'avenir, he celebrated the advent of the new republic and the onward march of individual liberty. Gautier experienced a prominent time in his life when the original romantics such as Hugo, François-René de Chateaubriand, Alphonse de Lamartine, Alfred de Vigny, and Alfred de Musset were no longer actively participating in the literary world. His prestige was confirmed by his role as director of Revue de Paris from 1851 to 1856. During this time, Gautier left La Presse and became a journalist for Le Moniteur universel, finding the burden of regular journalism quite unbearable and "humiliating". Nevertheless, Gautier acquired the editorship of the influential review L'Artiste in 1856. It is in this review that Gautier publicized art for art's sake doctrines through many editorials.

The 1860s were years of assured literary fame for Gautier. Although he was rejected by the French Academy three times (1867, 1868, 1869), Charles-Augustin Sainte-Beuve, the most influential critic of the day, set the seal of approval on the poet by devoting no less than three major articles in 1863 to reviews of Gautier's entire published works. In 1865, Gautier was admitted into the prestigious salon of Princess Mathilde Bonaparte, cousin of Napoleon III and niece to Bonaparte. The Princess offered Gautier a sinecure as her librarian in 1868, a position that gave him access to the court of Napoleon III.

Elected in 1862 as chairman of the Société Nationale des Beaux-Arts, he was surrounded by a committee of important painters: Eugène Delacroix, Pierre Puvis de Chavannes, Édouard Manet, Albert-Ernest Carrier-Belleuse, and Gustave Doré.

During the Franco-Prussian War, Gautier made his way back to Paris upon hearing of the Prussian advance on the capital. He remained with his family throughout the invasion and the aftermath of the Commune, eventually dying at the age of 61 on 23 October 1872 due to a long-standing cardiac disease. He is interred at the Cimetière de Montmartre in Paris.

In 1873, A. Lemerre published a collection of memorial poems, Le Tombeau de Théophile Gautier, with homages by Anatole France, Victor Hugo, Algernon Charles Swinburne, and many others.

== Personal life ==
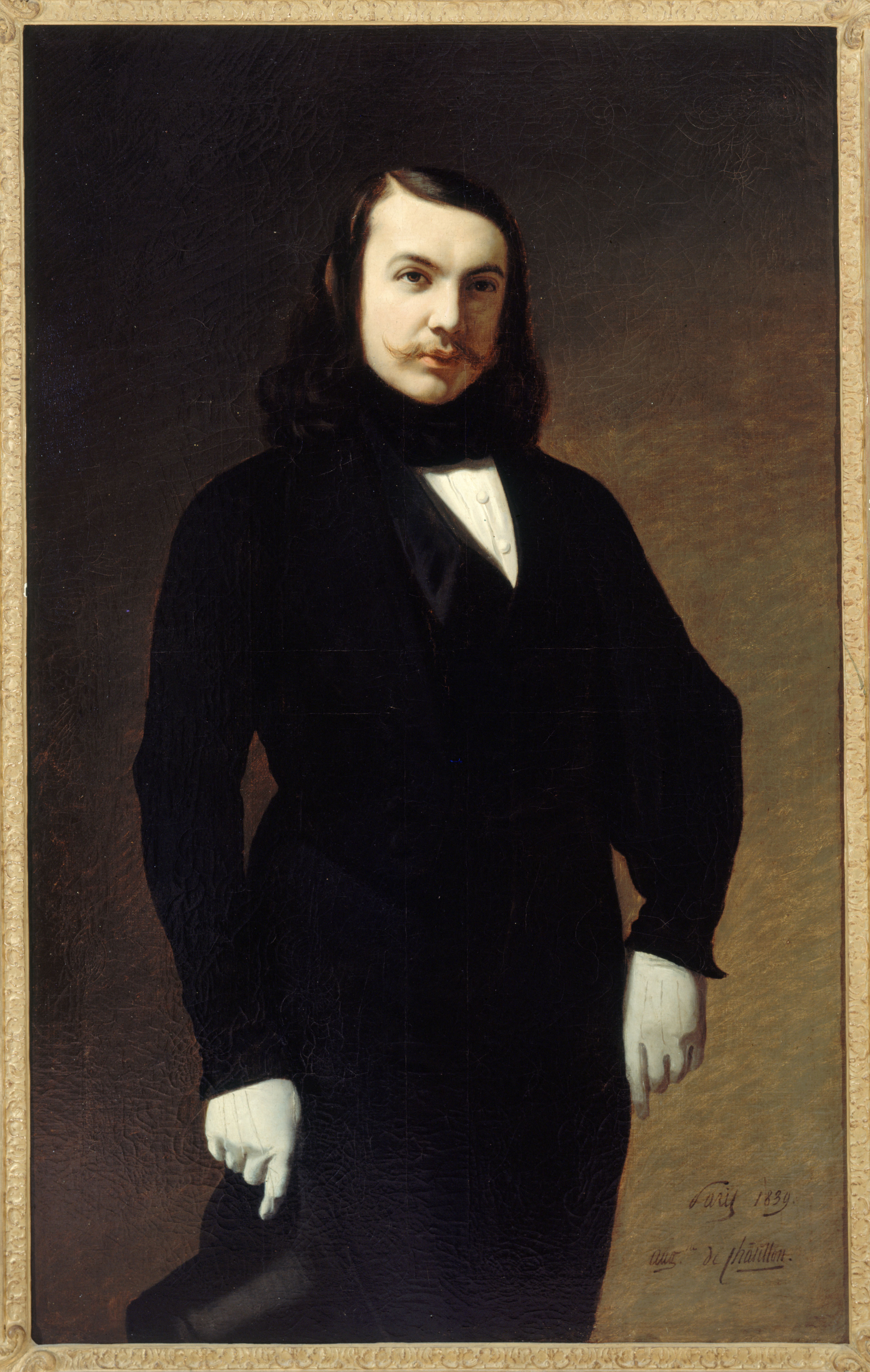
Portrait of Théophile Gautier, by Auguste de Châtillon, 1839

The young Gautier's appearance was "flamboyant…defying conventionality by his flowing hair and far-famed scarlet waistcoat".

In his youth, according to Edgar Saltus, Gautier was dashing, athletic, amorous, and mercurial:

He was tall and robust; his hair was a wayward flood; his eyes were blue and victorious. He was the image of Young France. His strength was proverbial; he outdid Dante; he swam from Marseilles to the Chateau d’If, and then swam back. [...] women fell in love with him at once.

From an affair with Eugénie Fort, he had a son, Théophile Gautier fils. From a subsequent relationship with the singer Ernesta Grisi (sister of the dancer Carlotta Grisi), he had two daughters, Judith Gautier and Estelle Gautier.

Despite his attraction to "mystery, legend, tradition, the picturesque and the imaginative", and the occasional "excursion into the realms of the beyond", Gautier did not practice any established religion.

== Criticism ==
Gautier spent the majority of his career as a journalist at La Presse and later at Le Moniteur universel. He saw journalistic criticism as a means to a middle-class standard of living. The income was adequate and he had ample opportunities to travel. Gautier began contributing art criticism to obscure journals as early as 1831. It was not until 1836 that he experienced a jump in his career when he was hired by Émile de Girardin as an art and theatre columnist for La Presse. During his time at La Presse, however, Gautier also contributed nearly 70 articles to Le Figaro. After leaving La Presse to work for Le Moniteur universel, the official newspaper of the Second Empire, Gautier wrote both to inform the public and to influence its choices. His role at the newspaper was equivalent to the modern book or theatre reviewer. He also reviewed music, without technical terminology but with intelligence and insight, for instance into the work of his friend Berlioz, who set six of his poems (c. 1840) as Les Nuits d'été.

Later in life, he wrote extensive monographs on Gérard de Nerval, Balzac and Baudelaire, some of whom were also his friends. His essay on 15th-century French poet François Villon was key to the revival of attention to his work. Gautier was the first critic to recognize the work of Paul Verlaine, coining the term poète maudit (outcast poet) to characterize his outsider poetics. Baudelaire dedicated his collected poems, Les Fleurs du mal, to him.

=== Art criticism ===
Gautier started as a painter and later turned to art criticism. He was strongly committed to Denis Diderot's idea that the critic should have the ability to describe the art such that the reader might "see" the art through his description. In 1862 he was elected chairman of the Société Nationale des Beaux-Arts (National Society of Fine Arts) with a board which included Eugène Delacroix, Édouard Manet, Gustave Doré and Pierre Puvis de Chavannes.

=== Literary criticism ===
In Gautier's literary criticism, he made a clear distinction between prose and poetry, stating that prose should never be considered the equal of poetry. The bulk of Gautier's criticism, however, was journalistic.

=== Theatre criticism ===
The majority of Gautier's career was spent writing a weekly column of theatrical criticism. He suggested that the normal five acts of a play could be reduced to three: an exposition, a complication, and a dénouement. Having abandoned the idea that tragedy is the superior genre, Gautier was later willing to accept comedy as the equal of tragedy. Taking it a step further, he suggested that the nature of the theatrical effect should be in favour of creating fantasy rather than portraying reality because realistic theatre was undesirable.

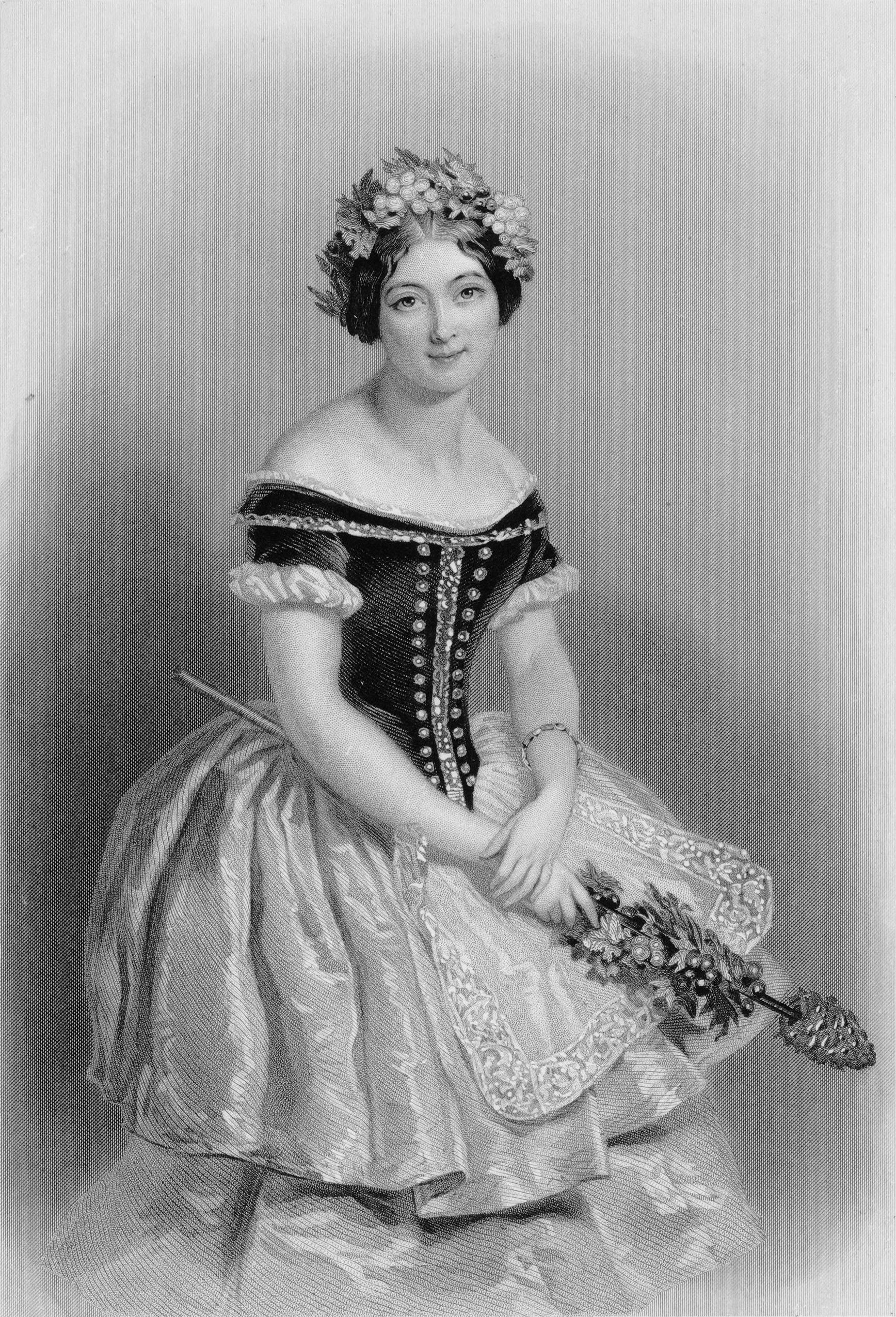
Carlotta Grisi, his great love, as Giselle, 1842

=== Dance criticism ===
The American writer Edwin Denby, considered by some to be the most significant writer about dance in the 20th century, claimed Gautier to be a great dance writer. Through his authorship of the scenario of the ballet Giselle, one of the foundation works of the dance repertoire, his influence remains as great among choreographers and dancers as among critics and devotees of ballet.

In 2011, Pacific Northwest Ballet presented a reconstruction of the work as close to its narrative and choreographic sources as possible, based on archival materials dating back to 1842, the year after its premiere.

== Works ==
In many of Gautier's works, the subject is less important than the pleasure of telling the story. He favoured a provocative yet refined style. This list links each year of publication with its corresponding "[year] in poetry" article, for poetry, or "[year] in literature" article for other works):

=== Poetry ===
- Poésies, published in 1830, is a collection of 42 poems that Gautier composed at the age of 18. However, as the publication took place during the July Revolution, no copies were sold and it was eventually withdrawn. In 1832, the collection was reissued with 20 additional poems under the name Albertus. Another edition in 1845 included revisions of some of the poems. The poems are written in a wide variety of verse forms and show that Gautier attempts to imitate other, more established Romantic poets such as Sainte-Beuve, Alphonse de Lamartine, and Hugo, before Gautier eventually found his own way by becoming a critic of Romantic excesses.
- Albertus, written in 1831 and published in 1832, is a long narrative poem of 122 stanzas, each consisting of 12 lines of alexandrine (12-syllable) verse, except for the last line of each stanza, which is octosyllabic. Albertus is a parody of Romantic literature, especially of tales of the macabre and the supernatural. The poem tells the story of an ugly witch who magically transforms at midnight into an alluring young woman. Albertus, the hero, falls deeply in love and agrees to sell his soul.
- Les Jeunes-France ("The Jeunes-France: Tales Told with Tongue in Cheek"), published in 1833, was a satire of Romanticism. In 1831, the newspaper Le Figaro featured a number of works by the young generation of Romantic artists and published them in the Jeunes-France.
- La Comédie de la Mort (Fr), published in 1838, is a period piece much like Albertus. In this work, Gautier focuses on the theme of death, which for Gautier is a terrifying, stifling and irreversible finality. Unlike many Romantics before him, Gautier's vision of death is solemn and portentous, proclaiming death as the definitive escape from life's torture. During the time he wrote the work, Gautier was frequenting many cemeteries, which were then expanding rapidly to accommodate the many deaths from epidemics that swept the country. Gautier translates death into a curiously heady, voluptuous, almost exhilarating experience which diverts him momentarily from the gruesome reality and conveys his urgent plea for light over darkness, life over death. Several of these poems have been set as melodies by composers such as Berlioz, Bizet, Fauré, and Duparc.
- España (1845) is usually considered the transitional volume between the two phases of Gautier's poetic career. Inspired by the author's summer 1840 visit to Spain, the 43 miscellaneous poems in the collection cover topics including the Spanish language and aspects of Spanish culture and traditions such as music and dance.
- Émaux et Camées ("Enamels and Cameos", 1852), published when Gautier was touring the Middle East, is considered his supreme poetic achievement. The title reflects Gautier's abandonment of the romantic ambition to create a kind of "total" art involving the emotional participation of the reader, in favour of a more modern approach focusing on the poetic composition's form and a more objective engagement with content. Originally a collection of 18 poems in 1852, its final edition (1872) contains 48 poems. (Translated into English by Sunny Lou Publishing, ISBN 978-1-95539-232-7, 2022.)
- Dernières Poésies (1872) is a collection of poems that range from earlier pieces to unfinished fragments composed shortly before Gautier's death. This collection is dominated by numerous sonnets dedicated to many of his friends.

=== Plays ===
Gautier did not consider himself to be a dramatist but more of a poet and storyteller. His plays were limited because of the time in which he lived; during the Revolution of 1848, many theatres were closed down and therefore plays were scarce. Most of the plays that dominated the mid-century were written by playwrights who insisted on conformity and conventional formulas and catered to cautious middle-class audiences. As a result, most of Gautier's plays were never published or reluctantly accepted.

Between the years 1839 and 1850, Gautier wrote all or part of nine different plays:

- Un Voyage en Espagne (1843)
- La Juive de Constantine (1846)
- Regardez mais ne touchez pas (1847) — written less by Gautier than his collaborators.
- Pierrot en Espagne (1847) — Gautier's authorship is uncertain.
- L'Amour souffle où il veut (1850) — not completed
- Une Larme du diable (1839) ("The Devil's Tear") was written shortly after Gautier's trip to Belgium in 1836. The work is considered an imitation of a medieval mystery play, a type of drama popular in the 14th century. These plays were usually performed in churches because they were religious in nature. In Gautier's play, God cheats a bit to win a bet with Satan. The play is humorous and preaches both in favour and against human love.
- Le Tricorne enchanté (1845; "The Magic Hat") is a play set in the 17th century. The plot involves an old man named Géronte who wishes to marry a beautiful woman who is in love with another man. After much scheming, the old man is duped and the lovers are married.
- La Fausse Conversion (1846) ("The False Conversion") is a satirical play written in prose. It was published in the Revue des Deux Mondes on 1 March. As with many other Gautier plays, the drama was not performed in his lifetime. It takes place in the 18th century, before the social misery that preceded the French Revolution. La Fausse Conversion is highly antifeminist and expresses Gautier's opinion that a woman must be a source of pleasure for man or frozen into art.
- Pierrot Posthume (1847) is a brief comedic fantasy inspired by the Italian Commedia dell'arte, popular in France since the 16th century. It involves a typical triangle and ends happily ever after.

=== Novels ===
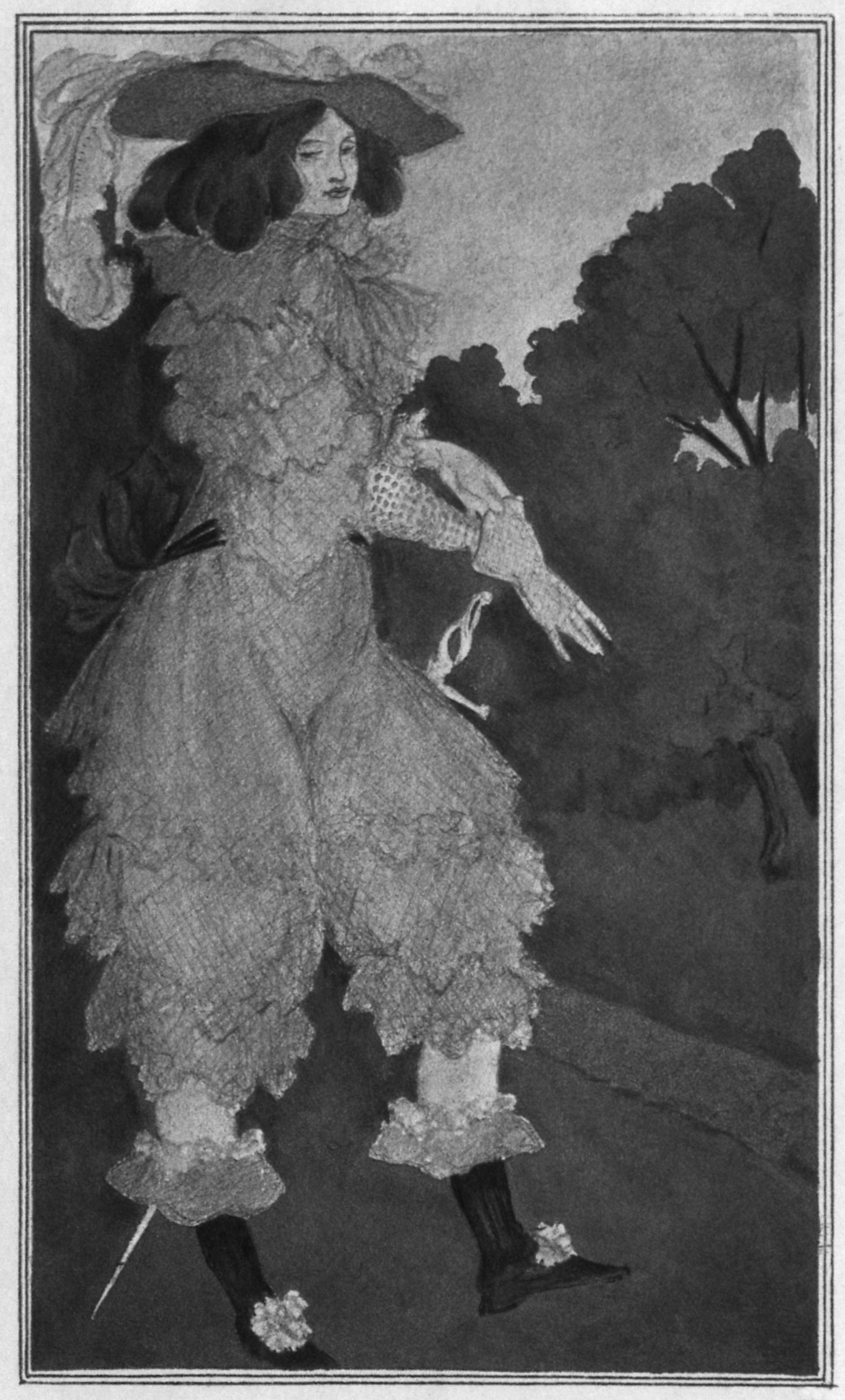
The fictional Mademoiselle de Maupin, from Six Drawings Illustrating Théophile Gautier's Romance Mademoiselle de Maupin, by Aubrey Beardsley, 1897

- Mademoiselle de Maupin (1835) In September 1833, Gautier was solicited to write a historical romance based on the life of French opera star Mlle. Maupin, who was a first-rate swordswoman and often went about disguised as a man. Originally, the story was to be about the historical La Maupin, who set fire to a convent for the love of another woman, but later retired to a convent herself, shortly before dying in her thirties. Gautier instead turned the plot into a simple love triangle between a man, d'Albert, and his mistress, Rosette, who both fall in love with Madeleine de Maupin, who is disguised as a man named Théodore. The message behind Gautier's version of the infamous legend is the fundamental pessimism about the human identity, and perhaps the entire Romantic age. The novel consists of seventeen chapters, most in the form of letters written by d'Albert or Madeleine. Most critics focus on the preface of the novel, which preached about art for art's sake through its dictum that "everything useful is ugly".
- Eldorado, ou Fortunio (1837) Serialized in Le Figaro in 1837; published as a book in 1838. Translated as Fortunio by 1907. An absurdist, decadent, and Orientalist fantasy story that takes place in Paris and revolves around the mysterious man Fortunio, raised in India, and his French love Musidora.
- Le Roman de la Momie (1858) Translated as The Romance of a Mummy in 1863. A historical novel set in Ancient Egypt, which features the Biblical Exodus.
- Captain Fracasse (1863) This book was promised to the public in 1836 but was finally published in 1863. The novel represents a different era and is a project that Gautier had wanted to complete earlier in his youth. It is centered on a soldier named Fracasse whose adventures portray bouts of chivalry, courage and a sense of adventure. Gautier places the story in his favourite historical era, that of Louis XIII. It is best described as a typical cloak-and-dagger fairy tale where everyone lives happily ever after.

=== Short stories ===
- La Morte Amoureuse (1836) Classic tale of the supernatural in which a priest receives nocturnal visitations from a female vampire. Reprinted by Valde Books as Clarimonde.
- One of Cleopatra's Nights and Other Fantastic Romances (1882) Collection of six of his short stories in English translation by Lafcadio Hearn.

=== Travel books ===
- The travels of Théophile Gautier – 4 Volumes.

The travels of Théophile Gautier Vol 4

Travels in Russia Vol 1

== Legacy ==
Two poems from "Émaux et camées"—"Sur les lagunes" and the second of two titled "Études de Mains"—are featured in Oscar Wilde's The Picture of Dorian Gray. Dorian reads them out of the book shortly after Basil Hallward's murder.

Swiss-German composer Dagmar Rybner used Gautier's text for her song "Chinoiserie."

Ernest Fanelli's Tableaux Symphoniques are based on Gautier's novel Le Roman de la Momie.

In Peter Whiffle by Carl Van Vechten, the main character Peter Whiffle cites Gautier as a great influence and writer, among others.

== Chronology of works ==
- 1830: Poésies (Vol. I).
- 1831: first article in Le Mercure de France au XIXe siècle.
- 1832: Albertus.
- 1833: Les Jeunes France, Romans Goguenards.
- 1834-5: published articles which will later form Les Grotesques.
- 1835-6: Mademoiselle de Maupin.
- 1836: published "Fortunio" under the title "El Dorado".
- 1836: La Morte Amoureuse.
- 1838: La Comédie de la Mort.
- 1839: Une Larme du Diable.
- 1840: Le Pied de Momie.
- 1841: premiere of the ballet, Giselle.
- 1843: Voyage en Espagne | premiere of ballet, La Péri.
- 1845: Poésies (complete) | first performance of comedy "Le Tricorne Enchanté".
- 1847: first performance of the comedy "Pierrot Posthume".
- 1851: premiere of the ballet, Pâquerette.
- 1852: Un Trio de Romans | Caprices et Zigzag | Emaux et Camées | Italia.
- 1853: Constantinople.
- 1851: premiere of the ballet, Gemma.
- 1855: Les Beaux-Arts en Europe.
- 1856: L’Art Moderne.
- 1858: Le Roman de la Momie | Honoré de Balzac.
- 1858-9: Histoire de l’Art Dramatique en France depuis Vingt-cinq Ans.
- 1861: Trésors d’Art de la Russie Ancienne et Moderne.
- 1863: Le Captaine Fracasse | Romans et Contes.
- 1863: De Profundis Morpionibus | Gautier preferred to keep that satirical work anonymous.
- 1865: Loin de Paris.
- 1867: Voyage en Russie.
- 1871: Tableaux de Siège: Paris 1870–1871.
- 1872: Emaux et Camées | Théâtre | Histoire du Romantisme.
