= Ivan Berlyn =

English actor (1867–1934)

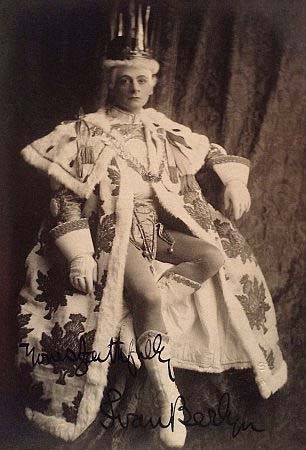
Ivan Berlyn in 1915

Ivan Berlyn (1867 – 11 December 1934) was an English actor of stage and silent film whose career spanned four decades. An experienced and versatile actor, Beryln played "... weird and eccentric character parts" in everything from pantomime to Shakespeare.

== Early life ==
He was born in Kensington in London as Isaac Berlin, the son of Emanuel Berlin (1839–1921) a Jewish "mercantile clerk" and a native of Hamburg who immigrated to England in 1857, and his wife Amelia née Joseph (1836–1915), who married in 1864. In the 1906 edition of the actors' directory The Green Room Book Berlyn made the spurious claim that he had been born as Ivan Emanuel Julian von Berlin and was descended from an ancient family from Alsace-Lorraine. He further claimed he had originally planned to join the legal profession but instead decided on a career on the stage, training at the London School of Elocution (the South London School of Elocution and Dramatic Art) established by Samuel Brandram. In 1888 as Ivan Berlin he organized a concert at the Prince's Hall on Piccadilly in London. Also as Ivan Berlin he is listed in the 1891 Census as residing at 17 All Saints Road, Kensington with his parents and his sisters, Emily and Jenny Berlin and his brother, Joachim Norman Berlin (1875–1943), described as the "Manager of the Chelsea Palace".

== Stage career ==
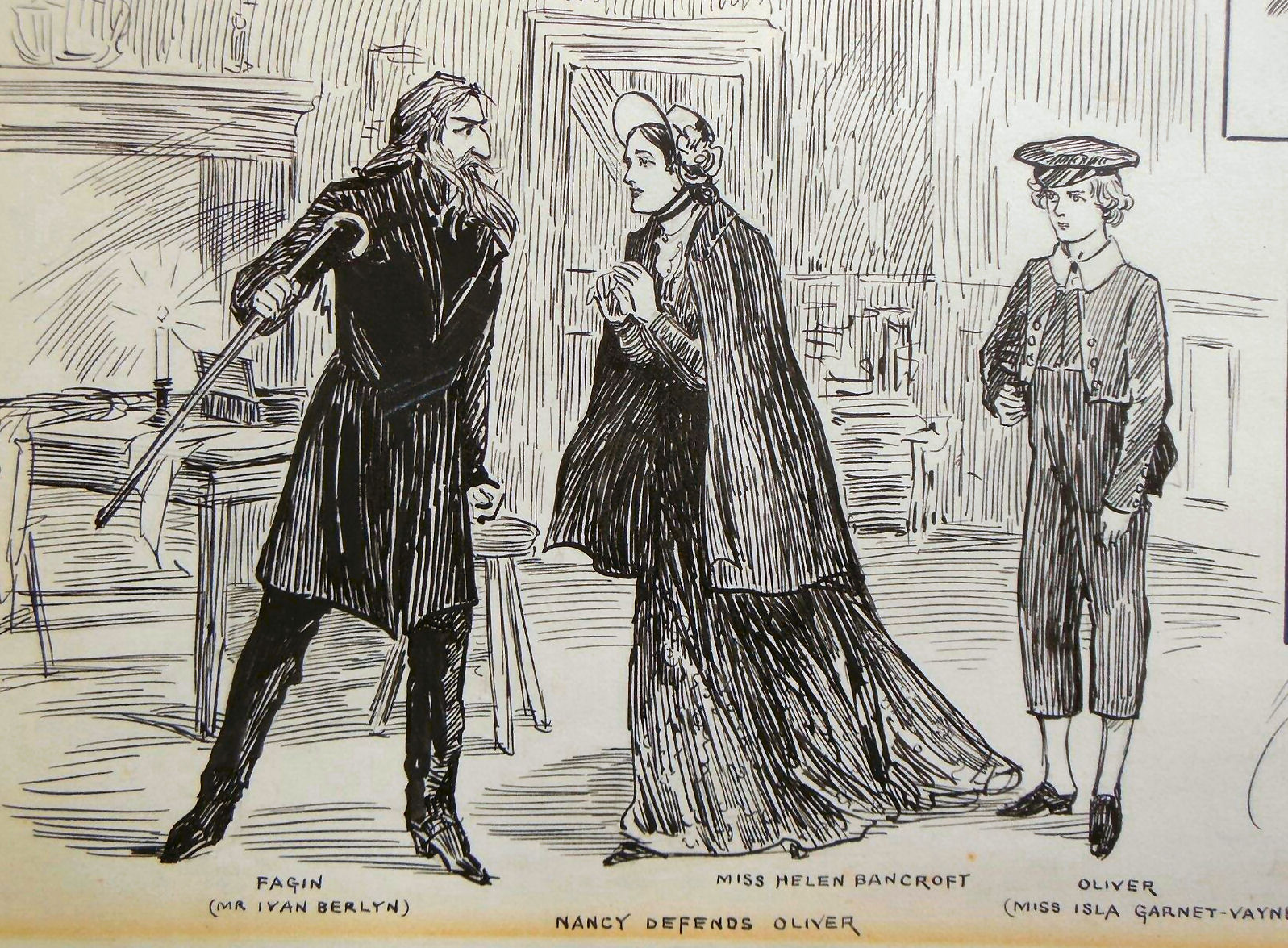
Berlyn as Fagin in Oliver Twist in 1903. Illustration in The Daily Graphic

Berlyn's stage appearances include: Doctor Caius in The Merry Wives of Windsor with Oscar Asche at the Haymarket Theatre (1929); in Henry V, Julius Caesar and The Merchant of Venice at the Alhambra Theatre in London (1933–1934); Norman in 100 Not Out at the Queen's Theatre, London (1930); Weird Sister in Macbeth at the Prince's Theatre, London (1926–1927); in The Banana Girl at the Prince of Wales Theatre, London (1925); Monty Gordon in Camille States Her Case at the Globe Theatre (1925); Krashoff in The Dare-Devil at the Strand Theatre (1924); Ichneumon Fly, Inventor in the British premiere of The Insect Play at the Regent Theatre, London (1922–1923); Destiny in The Betrothal at the Gaiety Theatre (1921); Humphrey in The Knight of the Burning Pestle at the Kingsway Theatre (1920) with Noël Coward and Roger Livesey; in Double Dutch at the Apollo Theatre on Shaftesbury Avenue (1916–1917); Signor Berchili in The Dancing Mistress starring Gertie Millar and with music by Lionel Monckton at the Adelphi Theatre, London (1912); Sambaroff in The Great Young Man, a comedy by Prince Vladimir Vladimirovich Baryatinsky (revised version of his The Career of Nablotsky) at the Kingsway Theatre in London (1911); Sambaroff in The Career of Nablotsky by Prince V. V. Baryatinsky at the Royalty Theatre (1910–1911); Yepikhodov in The Cherry Orchard at the Aldwych Theatre, London (1910–1911); in Links at the Scala Theatre, London (1907–1908); in Véronique at the Prince's Theatre in Bristol (1905–1906), and Fagin in Oliver Twist at the Grand Theatre, Islington (1903).

== Film roles ==
In 1922 Berlyn played Shylock in the Trial Scene from Merchant of Venice section of the film Tense Moments from Great Plays (1922) and Fagin in the Nancy section of the film Tense Moments with Great Authors (1922), with Sybil Thorndike as Nancy.

His other film roles include: Isaac Bernstein in The Phantom Picture (1916); Giovanni Leraca in Honour in Pawn opposite Helen Haye (1916); Giuseppe in The Usurper (1919); Ernest in Bookworms by A. A. Milne (1920) and a posthumous appearance as Father /Aguecheek in Immortal Gentleman (1935).

== Radio work ==
In June 1925 Berlyn played Nick Bottom in an early BBC Radio broadcast of A Midsummer Night's Dream.

== Personal life ==
In the 1911 Census Ivan Berlyn is listed as living at 3 King William Street in London; also listed is his boarder, Australian actor-manager Henry Louis Winthrop Armstrong (1881–1915). Berlyn and Armstrong appeared together in The Great Young Man, a comedy by Prince Vladimir Vladimirovich Baryatinsky and produced at the Kingsway Theatre in London in October 1911. In about 1915, Berlyn became the third husband of Hiene Riva Grinblat (Khana Rebecca Greenblatt, 1870–1949) and with her had two step-children: Abraham (Albert) Berlyn (Abrahams) (1903–1992) and Katie Berlyn (Abrahams) (1904–1934).

Ivan Berlyn died in 1934 at the National Hospital in Queen Square in Holborn. In his will he left £2,000 7s 4d.
