= Percy Greenbank =

English lyricist (1878–1968)

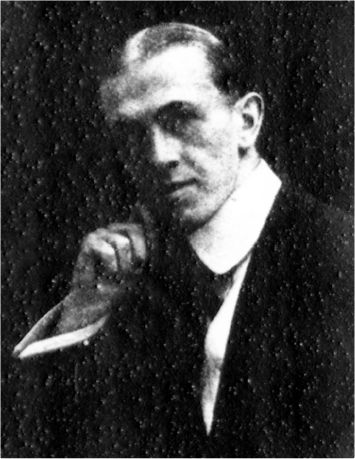
Greenbank in 1905

Percy Greenbank (24 January 1878 – 9 December 1968) was an English lyricist and librettist, best known for his contribution of lyrics to a number of successful Edwardian musical comedies in the early years of the 20th century. His older brother, the dramatist Harry Greenbank, had a brilliant career in the 1890s that was cut short by his death at the age of 33. Percy picked up where his brother had left off, writing lyrics for some of the most popular musicals from 1900 through World War I and even afterwards.

== Life and career ==
Greenbank was born in London, son of Richard and Mary Greenbank. He was Harry Greenbank's younger brother. Percy studied law, but instead decided to become a journalist, contributing to such journals as Punch, The Sketch and The Tatler, and to write for the theatre.

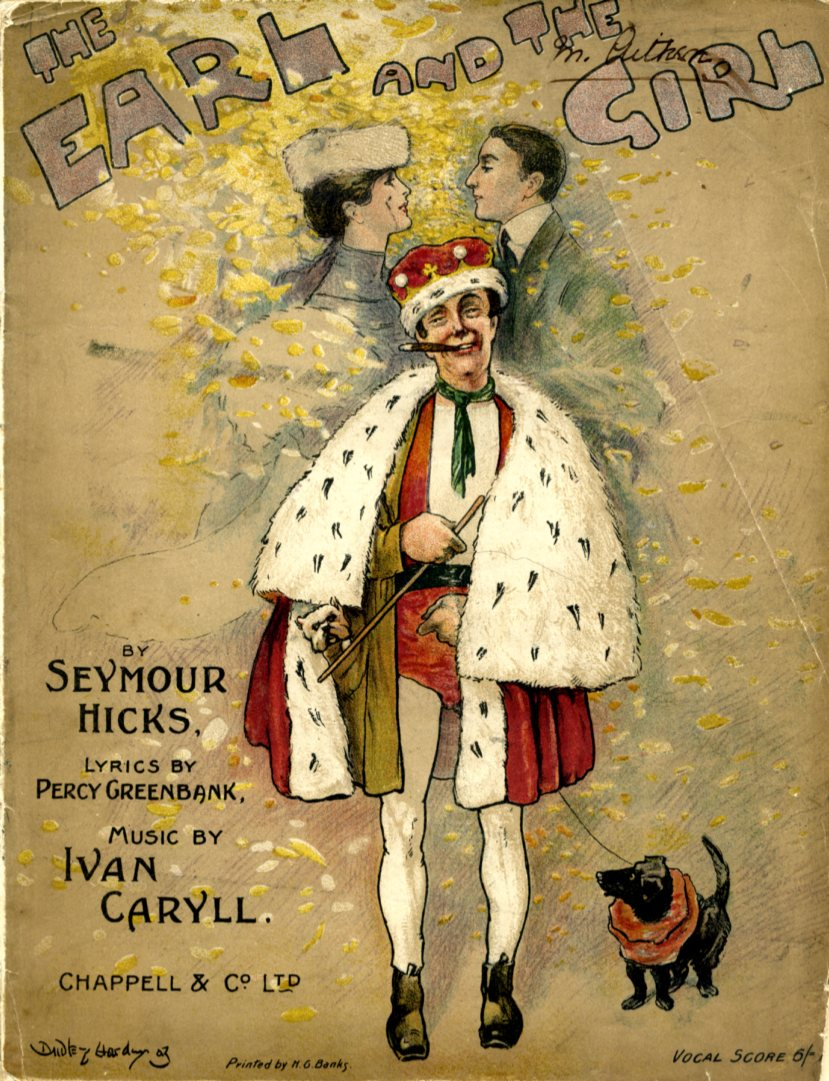
Cover of Vocal Score

After Harry's death, George Edwardes asked the younger Greenbank to collaborate with Adrian Ross on the lyrics for The Messenger Boy and also interpolated two of his lyrics into San Toy when that score was revised ("Somebody" and "All I Want is a Little Bit of Fun"). He began to collaborate with composers Ivan Caryll and Lionel Monckton, as well as with Ross and the deviser of the Gaiety show plots and outlines, James T. Tanner.

For the remaining 14 years of the Edwardes era Greenbank worked at the Gaiety Theatre, London, Daly's Theatre and later the Adelphi Theatre, contributing sometimes much and sometimes only a few lyrics to most of Edwardes's shows, including hits like The Toreador (1901), A Country Girl (1902), The Orchid (1903), The Earl and the Girl (1903), Lady Madcap (1904), Véronique (1904), The Cingalee (1904), The Little Michus (1905), The Spring Chicken (1905), The Girl Behind the Counter, (1906), The New Aladdin (1906), The Three Kisses (1907), Our Miss Gibbs (1909), The Quaker Girl (1910), The Dancing Mistress (1912) and The Girl From Utah (1913). During this time, he also produced shows at other theatres, such as Three Little Maids (1902), My Lady Molly (1902), Lady Madcap (1904), The Blue Moon (1905), See-See (1906), The Belle of Brittany (1908), A Persian Princess (1909), The Mousmé (1911), Princess Caprice (1912) and To-Night's the Night (opening in New York in 1914).

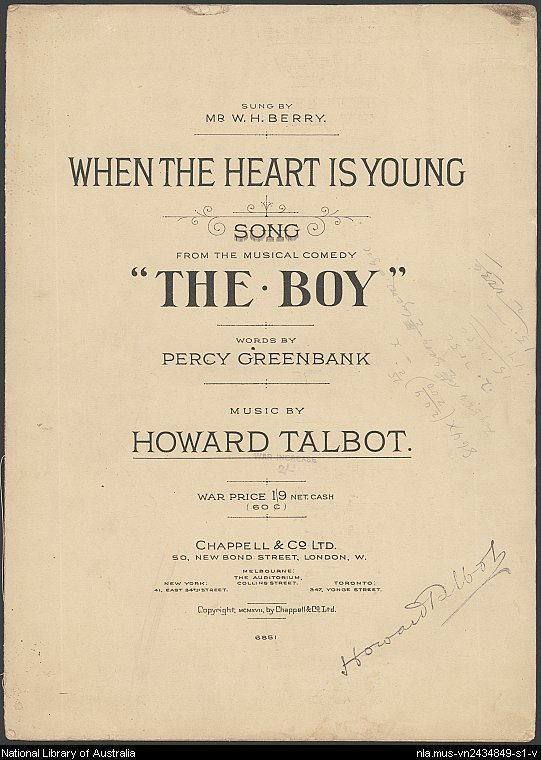
Sheet music from The Boy

After Edwardes' death in 1915, Greenbank continued for a further decade to supply lyrics and occasionally libretti to the musical stage, including such shows as Houp La! (1916) and the hit musical The Boy (1917), only rarely venturing into the world of revue (Half Past Eight and Vanity Fair). His last major work for the West End was the adaptation from the German of what was to become the book to the Jean Gilbert and Vernon Duke musical Yvonne. He subsequently did occasional work as a play doctor (El Dorado) or an adapter through the 1920s. He modernized San Toy with Percy J. Barrow for its 1931 revival, but slowed down into a long retirement.

Greenbank died in Rickmansworth, north west of London, in 1968 at the age of 90, and as a result, the Edwardian musical comedies to which he contributed remain in copyright in the UK until 2039.
