= Joseph Coyne =

American actor and singer

Joseph Coyne (27 March 1867 – 17 February 1941) was an American-born vaudevillian and musical comedy actor whose career spanned nearly 50 years, from 1883-1931. A popular performer in the U.S., he achieved major stardom in the role of Prince Danilo in George Edwardes' London adaptation of The Merry Widow, which led to other leading roles in Edwardian musical comedy and many other productions in London, New York, and Australia.

== Early life and breaking into theater ==
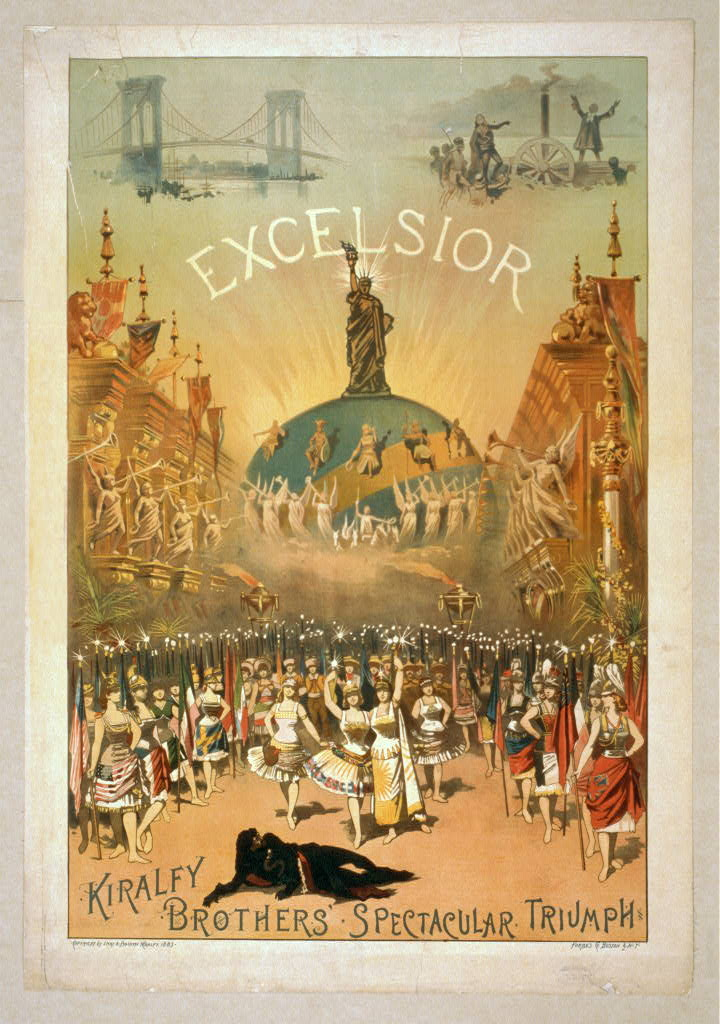

The son of Irish immigrants James P. Coyne of Queens County, and Margaret Downey of West Meath County, Coyne was born in New York City, the middle of three children. His father worked as a seaman and, later, a waiter, while his mother kept house.

Having shown talent for drawing "and the like," Coyne's parents apprenticed him to a sculptor where his job was to keep the clay moist for modeling, particularly over the weekends. But Coyne so loved the theater that he'd sneak off to watch shows instead of keeping the clay wet, and fled the job after breaking a statue that was supposed to be under his care.

Instead Coyne, having "of his own accord discovered himself as a dancer," went to a casting call for boys who could dance, and was one of six out of hundreds who was cast, thanks to his natural talent. He made his stage debut in New York at 16 as a performer in one of The Kiralfy Brothers spectacular productions (Excelsior 1883-1885). He performed in Excelsior for its year-long run, and went on tour with the show following that.

Coyne spent the next 10 years in Vaudeville, perfecting his comedic skills as half of a duo known as 'Evans and Coyne,' with his friend, actor Frank Evans. They performed in music halls and anywhere else that would book them, including joining a circus and performing in blackface.

== Theatrical career ==
=== A "real" actor ===
Coyne first appeared in legitimate theatre in 1895, joining the Rose Lyall Dramatic Company. The years that followed were referred to by Coyne as a period of "arduous stock work in drama," playing in several variety farce-comedies beginning with The District Attorney (1985), and The Good Mr. Best (1897). The work was hard and unrewarding, yet provided great experience.

Joseph's first starring role was in Charles Hale Hoyt's A Stranger in New York at the Garrick Theatre in NY 1897. In 1899 Hale wrote a leading role especially for Coyne in the short-lived The Dog in the Manger at the Washington National Theater. This was followed by roles in The Girl in the Barracks (1899), Star and Garter (1900), The Night of the Fourth (1901).

Somewhere in this timeframe Charles Frohman, who liked to go out in search of talent himself, saw Coyne playing "a very cheap theatre in New York" and knew he had found something special.

=== London and Broadway and London ===
Thanks to Charles Frohman's discovery, it was in 1901 that Coyne made his first appearance on the London stage, playing opposite Edna May in Frohman's The Girl from Up There.

Returning to America he got his Broadway break playing the role of Archie in The Toreador (1902). Following that were a string of roles in which he played the "silly-ass" drunken English gentleman to great effect: The Rogers Brothers in London (1903–04), In Newport (1904–05), Abigail (1905), The Rollicking Girl (1905–06), The Social Whirl (1906), and My Lady's Maid (1906). According to the Biographical Dictionary of Dance (1982), Coyne became known for his drunk act and physical comedy: falling down staircases, over tables, and on top of comic leads. It was a typecasting that obscured his other abilities, but one that brought wide recognition.

In 1906, Coyne returned to England with Edna May for his second London West End show, as the comic-aristocrat Billy Rickets in Frohman's Nelly Neil (1907). It was here, on opening night, 10 January 1907, that George Edwardes first saw Joseph Coyne, previously unknown to him, perform, and recognized "the possibilities in this young man who could not sing at all, but who could certainly dance, and who could most certainly act. Edwardes saw Coyne as a new type. His pioneering spirit was awake; here was a complete change from the rather stiff, if handsome and stagily dashing, young man whose voice, as a rule, made his success. This young man had no voice, but he had personality, he had charm, he had individuality. Here was a man who could play Prince Danilo in The Merry Widow as Edwardes now thought it should be played, not as a romantic hero of the light operatic stage, but as a lover in real life with actual flesh and blood and feelings." Edwardes offered Coyne the role that same night, meeting with him in his dressing room after the show.

London theatre-goers were clearly as entranced by Coyne as was Edwardes. One newspaper headline proclaimed "Edna May eclipsed again [...] most of the honors of Nelly Neil have gone to Joseph Coyne." The article goes on to say that long after curtain call on opening night the audience continued calling "Coyne, Coyne!" and claim that, if not for him, the play would likely have a short career.

=== The Merry Widow, the reluctant hero, and major stardom ===
The casting of Joseph Coyne as romantic lead Prince Danilo in his enormously successful adaptation of Franz Lehár's German operetta The Merry Widow surprised the musical theater world. Not only couldn't Coyne sing, he was respected as a comedic actor and not viewed as a romantic lead least of all by himself. Coyne had never played a romantic lead, did not want to play a romantic lead. To quote eminent theatre historian W. J. MacQueen-Pope, who worked on the show with Edwardes and Coyne, Joe was "horrified" and "begged to be let off. But Edwardes was adamant. He told Coyne to leave it to him. 'You are going to be an enormous success, Joe,' he said; 'you wait and see.'

"But Coyne was most unhappy. Even when he discovered that he was to play it in the way which suited his personality, that he was not expected to sing some of the more difficult numbers, that he was to let his own ability and charm carry him along, he was still afraid. This was not his line of country at all, this Ruritanian stuff; he wanted to be slick and modern and American, as those things were understood in 1907. Even at the dress rehearsal he was scared stiff. He told [music publisher] William Boosey that he was in for the failure of his life. Boosey told him that, on the contrary, he was going to make the biggest hit of his career and would establish himself as a real and lasting favorite in London. Coyne shook his head dolefully. But both Edwardes and Boosey were right, for as a result of Danilo Joe Coyne was to be a favorite with London audiences until the day he died. ... But despite his enormous success in the part, Coyne never liked playing Danilo, and when it was all over said he was glad. ... To the end of his life he never understood why the chief comedy part was given to George Graves."

Of his performance in the part Coyne said, more than a decade later during an interview in Australia, "Prince Danilo was originally played at Carlsbad by an eminent German actor, [Louis] Treumann, as a purely romantic singing-role. At Daly's I presented it as a light, irresponsible young prince, whose love scenes, always sincere, yet possessed a touch of quaint humor."

Coyne's solution to overcoming his limited vocal skills was to recite lines in rhythm, originating the 'speak-style singing' technique popularized by—and often incorrectly credited to--Rex Harrison in My Fair Lady. Edwardes loved the effect, and that is how the show was rehearsed. But trouble was looming. The composer himself was coming to conduct opening night, and had no idea his romantic lead was a comedic actor who could not sing.

During the first rehearsal with Lehár, Edwardes explained that Coyne had a bad cold and must rest his voice. Whenever a Danilo song was imminent Edwardes would tell Coyne to cut the number and save his voice. As rehearsals progressed Lehár got antsy, he still had not heard Coyne sing. Seeing his frustration building, Edwardes suggested that Coyne could recite the next number to save his voice. Coyne did, remarkably well, and Edwardes used the opportunity to posit that the recitation was so beautiful, feeling, and dramatic, shouldn't they keep it that way instead of singing it? Lehár was dubious, Edwardes didn't press.

When, at the dress rehearsal, Joe finally performed by speaking his songs to the music, "Lehár was horrified. He stopped the rehearsal; he put down his baton. 'What was this?' he demanded. Edwardes assured Lehár that Mr. Coyne was a very funny man. 'But I have not written funny music," retorted Lehár. 'Herr Lehár,' he said, 'that man will put a fortune in your pocket, even if he does not sing your beautiful music.' The rehearsal dragged its weary way along. At last it was over. Lehár did not seem distressed, rather pleased than otherwise, though still doubtful of Joe."

First night ticket sales had not been as robust as usual for an Edwardes production. The first night audience was more quiet than usual. Lehár, who had not been able to do anything about the casting of Joe Coyne as Danilo, was still doubtful. The audience did not know what to make of Joe Coyne. He was not the romantic hero they were used to. He made his entrance "without dash, with absolute reluctance, with an odd walk, not handsome, not even good-looking, but round, a bit blank and, above all, worried. In Coyne's first number, he told of the joys of Maxim's, and of the girls there. Literally he told it, speaking the words, but speaking them so clearly, with such quiet meaning, and in such perfect time, that the melody behind them, with all the lilt of Maxim's and ladies in its dancing notes, was brilliantly enhanced by it." By the end of the first act Lehár was amazed. Though the audience seemed reserved and did not clap with typical enthusiasm, Lehár felt that Coyne had "unquestionably got his audience. He himself had felt the power this odd man Coyne was putting over the footlights."

By the time the curtain fell the audience was completely won over. "The applause went across the footlights like a prairie fire, accompanied by roars of cheers, warm and glowing with pleasure and affection, such cheers as are seldom heard by players. The particular triumph of [Joseph Coyne and Lily Elsie] had not been gained by boosting or publicity; it had been gained by themselves and their talent, and by the understanding of George Edwardes. They had won despite themselves. Neither had wanted to play their parts. [...] It seemed the applause would never stop; shouts for the players filled the air" and there were many rounds of curtain calls for the cast. In the end everyone was happy except for [...] Joseph Coyne. Joe could not see what the fuss was about; he still did not like the part; he still thought he was rotten, and he thought so to the end."

For all his initial horror around Coyne's recitation of one particular song in the original German version, Lehár came to realize "that this was the way in which Danilo should really be played. At all subsequent productions in other parts of the world he insisted that Coyne's method of reciting instead of singing the legend of the Prince's children should be followed. Seldom has an actor received such a tribute."

The show ran from 8 June 1907 to 31 July 1909. "As Joe Coyne took off his costume of Danilo for the last time he said he did so with pleasure. Despite that cheering, despite that wonderful display of affection, he still thought he was rotten..."

On the show's one year anniversary Coyne was distinguished as having not missed a single performance since the opening of the show. He is also said to have been the first non-British actor ever to have headed a cast at London's Daly Theatre.

=== Going straight ===
Taking a brief hiatus from The Merry Widow in 1908, Coyne starred in the comic play The Mollusc, by Hubert Henry Davies, at the Garrick Theatre in New York, opposite the English actress Alexandra Carlisle before returning to London to resume playing Prince Danilo.

Charles Frohman, in a cable to the Daily London Telegraph said of Coyne, with respect to casting him in The Mollusc, "...I have carefully watched Mr. Coyne's work, and I now predict for him an extraordinary future as an actor of great strength. Those are the words--an actor of great strength--way beyond anything ever dreamed of by his most ardent admirers. Few people could think of Miss Billie Burke in straight comedy, who knew her only in musical comedy. Now nobody who knows her in straight comedy can think of her in musical comedy. The same transformation, the same career and success, are in store for Mr. Coyne. Nor am I alone in this opinion. Hubert Henry Davies, author of The Mollusc told me and Coyne how thankful he is that America is to see his play performed by an actor of such rare technique and fine virility as distinguish Mr. Coyne's more recent work. In a word, America is to see quite a new Mr. Coyne when he appears in The Mollusc.

In an article for Theatre Magazine entitled "Speeches That Made Great Parts" author John D. Williams said "The much dreaded, much maligned long speech only deserves its reputation when it is mishandled. Deftly managed it can be made the chief joy of the play. For instance nothing could much surpass the skill and charm of manner with which Joseph Coyne defines a mollusc in the play of that name. The speech contains scientific lore, the merriest sort of human observation and considerable genuine philosophy. It is long but its actual length is never apparent, because of the carefully veiled devices Mr. Coyne employs properly to paragraph it without actually interrupting it."

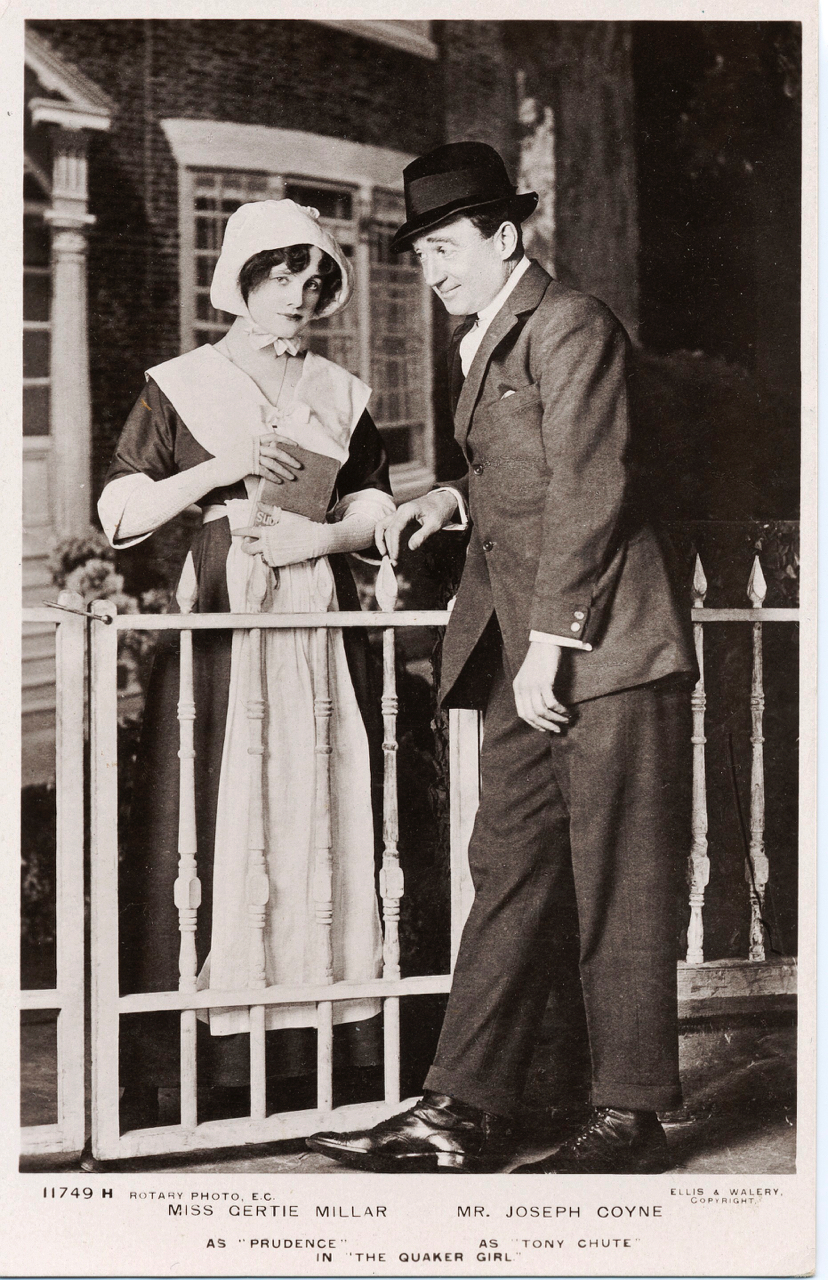

=== The Edwardes Era ===
Coyne followed this with a succession of leading roles for Edwardes, including Harry Q. Conder in The Dollar Princess (1909), Tony Chute in The Quaker Girl in both the London and the Paris companies (1910-1911), Teddy Cavanaugh in The Dancing Mistress (1912), and Sandy Blair in The Girl from Utah (1913), all in the West End.

In May 1914, suffering from heart trouble, George Edwardes traveled to a German health resort. When World War I broke out in July of that year, Edwardes and other non-German citizens were detained under house arrest. Edwardes was released in November, 1914, amidst urgent appeals from the American Consul. He never recovered his good health, and died at home 4 October 1915.

=== The World War Era ===
Coyne resumed working on the London stage playing O. Vivian Smith in He Didn't Want To Do It, a farcical play in 3 acts, by George Broadhurst and Walter Hackett (1915). Following that he appeared in the Irving Berlin's first musical Watch Your Step (1915), and another Berlin show, Follow The Crowd (Empire Theatre, opened 19 Feb 1916), which had debuted in New York as Stop! Look! Listen! in late 1915.

Other work in the World War I timeframe included playing Ronald Clibran in The Clock Goes Round (1916), Lawyer Gooch in Step In The Office (1916), and a local revue called The Bing Girls Are There (1917). He returned to musical theater in the role of Prince Paul of Perania in Arlette (1917), and Robert Street in Going Up (1918).

=== Touring Australia ===
In 1920 Coyne was engaged by J. C. Williamson Ltd. to star in three American farcical comedies at The Criterion in Sydney, Australia: "His Lady Friends," "Nightie Nightie," and "Wedding Bells." He was in Australia for the better part of 1921 and early 1922.

=== Back home in London ===
Returning to London, Coyne starred in Charlot's English-speaking version of the French musical comedy Dédé (1922, André La Huchette), and in the London production of Friml's Katinka (1923, Thaddeus T Hopper). At the age of 58 he received fresh acclaim as the youthful attorney "Jimmy Smith" in No, No, Nanette (1925), and followed this success playing T. Boggs John in Queen High (1926). Coyne's last appearance was in Apron Strings at the Vaudeville Theatre in 1931, in the role of Ezra Hunniwell.

== Marriages ==
In a March 1894 court hearing actress Grace Sherwood, who accused Coyne of assault, claimed that she and Coyne had been married three years prior, a fact Coyne denied. An article in The Buffalo Courier reporting on the case referred to Sherwood as Coyne's "common-law wife." Seventeen years later a 1911 article in The Sun claimed that the pair were "separated by divorce" sometime prior to August 1898. As of this edit, research has not revealed either a marriage record or a divorce record for the couple.

In August 1898 Joseph married American actress Anna Boyd in New York. A decade later the two divorced amid rumors that Coyne was engaged to actress Alexandra Carlisle. Reports regarding the engagement surfaced as early as March 1908, which is about the time Charles Frohman announced that Coyne and Carlisle would star together in The Mollusc in New York that fall. The situation blew up in November 1908 during the final weeks of The Mollusc's run when reports of an engagement between Coyne and Carlisle reached Anna Boyd, who was compelled to assert herself as Mrs. Joseph Coyne by visiting Carlisle's New York apartment to introduce herself as such.

Much denial ensued, with Coyne claiming he was not married to Boyd, and both Carlisle and Coyne denying any engagement. A year later, in September 1909, Coyne announced that he and English actress Alexandra Carlisle had secretly wed on 3 December 1908, issuing a statement that said, "We wished to get along quietly until the event was so far back that nobody would want to throw rice and old shoes at us. We have realized our best hopes and are happy. A quiet wedding saves you a lot of trouble and your friends a lot of rice." Ironically, just two months earlier on 25 July 1909, the Washington Herald reported that Anna Boyd had finalized her divorce from Coyne, who would soon wed Alexandra Carlisle.

The secret marriage between Coyne and Carlisle in 1908 ended in a secret divorce sometime in 1912, quickly followed by another secret marriage; in Oct 1912 Carlisle married Dr. Albert Pfeiffer, an American dentist living in London.

== Personality and Persona ==
Theatre historian and author W. J. MacQueen-Pope, who worked with Coyne on The Merry Widow, described him as "a curious-looking fellow, with a round face and a pair of rather sad eyes, loose-limbed and with a habit of kicking out on each side with his feet as he walked. Here was a man who could twist a woman round his finger without effort, but his simple, wistful appeal, and who also would be hail-fellow-well-met with the men; there was the smile and the lurking mischief in the eye, which peep forth from time to time, to prove it.

On the stage, Joseph Coyne had a distinct style. This American actor became popular with the British public. He lived and worked in London for a long time that many people did not realize he was from the United States. He was a professional who developed his skills through many years of experience in the industry.

One critic, in reviewing The Quaker Girl wrote of him that, like other stars of musical comedy including Gertie Millar, "It is no good their pretending to be any one else. We go to see themselves, and all we ask is that the authors and others shall give them every chance of being themselves in the most pronounced and personal fashion".

MacQueen-Pope also had the following to say about Joe Coyne: "He was an extraordinary man. All theatrical people are a little mad; otherwise they are no good in that crazy place, the Theatre. But Joe had slightly more madness than usual. He had strong likes and dislikes. If he did not like anyone, they knew all about it. If he did, the knew all about it too. It was a matter of extreme difficulty to get him to make up his mind about anything—especially if it was for his own good. One of the present writers had a long-drawn-out and weary task in persuading him to play in Going Up at the Gaiety, in which he made an immense success. He was very doubtful about it. But he did it.

"He was of a very economical turn of mind. He believed in ready money, but had little faith in banks or investments. He liked to see his cash. For many hears he kept his money in a safe deposit in the West End and would go down and count it. He said he would retire when it reached a certain figure. That figure was never reached because he was persuaded to make some investments--or speculations--also against his will, and he suffered for this departure from his custom by losing a lot of money in one of the Wall Street crashes.

"That frightened him badly. Indeed, he imagined he was ruined. Even the sight of his own money failed to reassure him. He became more economical than ever. He lived in a top room at the Carlton Hotel, but he did not have his meals there. He said he could not afford them. He would wash his own 'smalls' in his bedroom and dry his socks and handkerchiefs on the towel rail. It saved him money. He went out to tea most afternoons with his friend, one of the hotel linkmen, and they partook of this meal in a little dairy in the neighborhood of St. James's Street. His one extravagance was ice cream. Of this he devoured quantities. He would go into the Coventry Street Corner House, at all hours of the day or night, and consume small mountains of it. He said he liked it, and that it kept him fit.

"He took the greatest care of his clothes; many of his suits were years old and most of them he had worn on the stage--and acquired. Comment on his smart shoes, and, if he knew you, he would lift up his foot and show the metal 'taps' still on th soles. Shirts, collars and ties--all came from the theatre, and he valeted himself with scrupulous care. He walked everywhere; he said it kept him slim and fit. It also saved money."

He could be incredibly obstinate. In one scene in The Clock Goes Round he was to carry in a candle in stuck into a bottle and set it on a piano. An electric candle was used for this, but Joe hated it. He had a dislike for anything mechanical and found the electric candle difficult to operate. On opening night, instead of using the electric prop he snuck a real, lighted candle past the stage manager and set it on the piano. At one point he backed into the candle and set his costume's neck ruffle on fire. Without breaking character he managed to get the ruffle off and stamped out the fire. One report says the audience never realized what was happening, another says a great puff of smoke wafted into the auditorium and caused the fire alarm to sound.

MacQueen-Pope mentions that "later in life [Coyne] reached a stage when he would have long conversations on street corners with people quite invisible to anyone else, but most interesting and chatty to him. Joe suffered from hallucinations..."

== Death ==
After retiring from the stage in 1931 at the age of 64, Coyne settled in Virginia Water, near Windsor. He died of pneumonia in 1941, aged 73.
