= James T. Tanner =

English stage director and dramatist

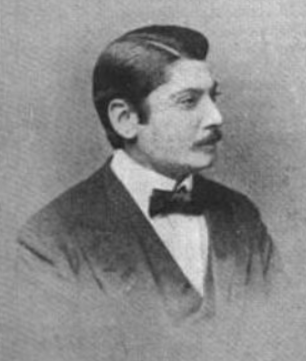
- In The Sketch, 28 November 1894
- Born: James Tolman Tanner; 17 October 1858; London, England
- Died: 18 June 1915 (aged 56); London, England
- Burial place: Brookwood Cemetery
- Occupations: Theatre director, dramatist

James Tolman Tanner (17 October 1858 – 18 June 1915) was an English stage director and dramatist who wrote many of the successful musicals produced by George Edwardes.

== Life and career ==
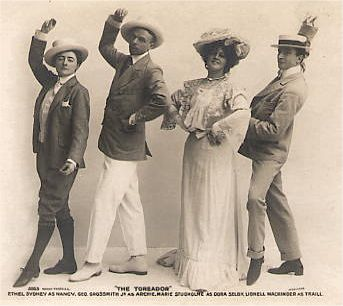
Scene from The Toreador

James T. Tanner was born in London on 17 October 1858. He began his theatre career as a set-painter and actor and toured early on with Auguste van Biene's company, among others, including as Volteface in The Old Guard. Then he became company manager and stage director. In 1892 he wrote his first play, The Broken Melody, which became a success on tour and internationally for van Biene. By this time, Tanner was directing Gaiety Theatre burlesque productions on tour and sometimes at the Gaiety for van Biene, including Faust up to Date in 1892.

Payne and Grossmith in The New Aladdin

George Edwardes noticed the versatile Tanner and hired him as a director and "show doctor" at the Gaiety. He first directed The Baroness for Edwardes, then directed and conceived the innovative musical play In Town (1892), which would help set the fashion for the Gaiety Theatre shows that were to follow. He provided the outline on which Owen Hall would write the book for A Gaiety Girl (1893). He also completed the unfinished burlesque of Don Yuan (1893, with music by Meyer Lutz and lyrics by Adrian Ross), which Fred Leslie had begun to write as a star vehicle for comedian Arthur Roberts but died before finishing, and Tanner also directed the production. Tanner also directed the original Gaiety Theatre production of The Shop Girl (1894) and An Artist's Model (1895) and A Modern Trilby (1895, starring Nellie Farren), both at Daly's Theatre.

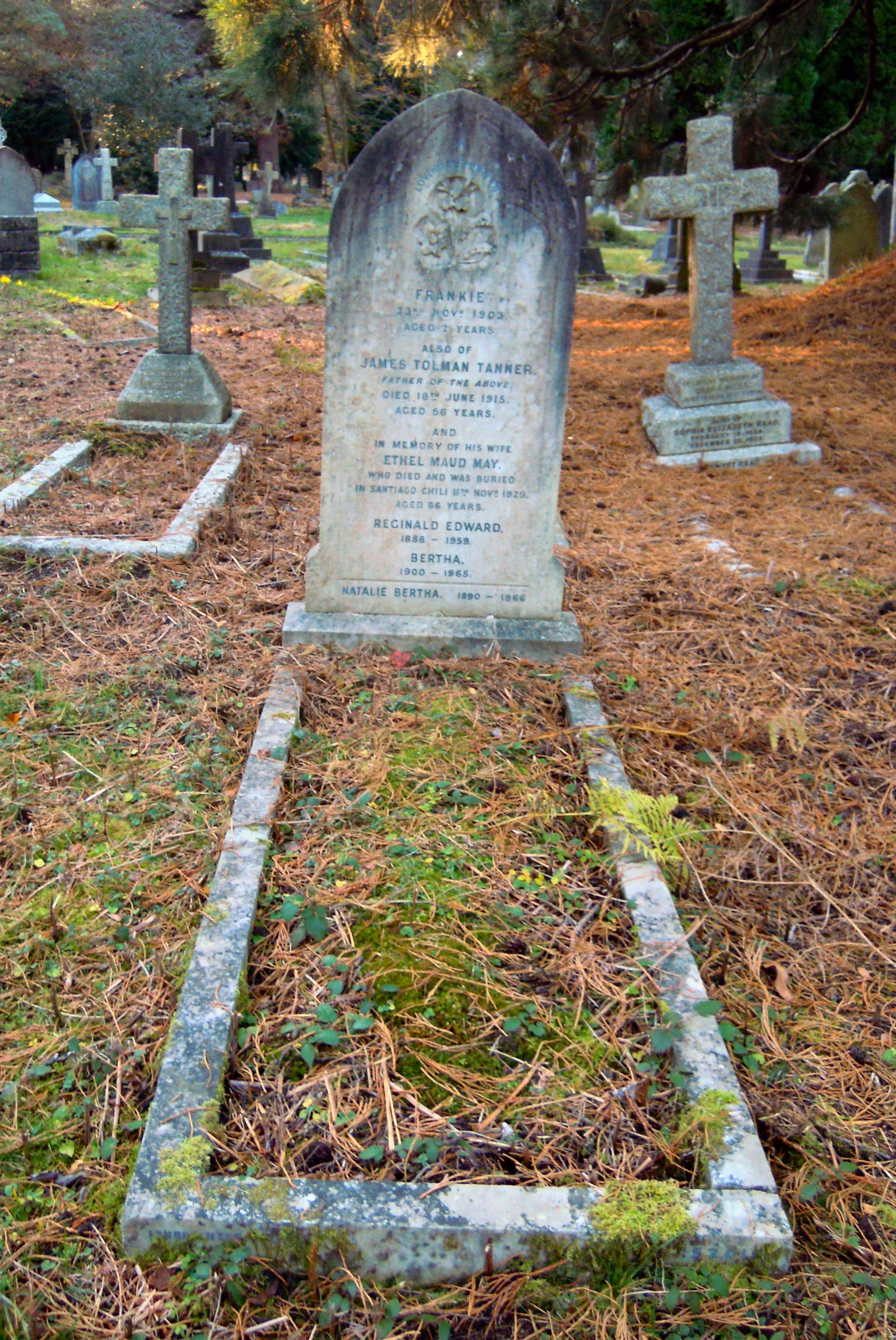
Tanner's grave in Brookwood Cemetery

After that, Tanner focused on writing some of the most popular shows of the period for Edwardes, with music mostly by Ivan Caryll and Lionel Monckton and often lyrics by Adrian Ross and one or the other of the Greenbank brothers, including My Girl in 1896 (with Ross and F. Osmond Carr), The Circus Girl, in 1896, The Ballet Girl in 1897 (with Carl Kiefert and Ross, which he also directed for Broadway), The Transit of Venus in 1898 (with Napoleon Lambelet and Ross), The Messenger Boy in 1900, The Toreador in 1901, A Country Girl in 1902, The Orchid in 1903, The Cingalee in 1904, The New Aladdin in 1906, Our Miss Gibbs in 1919, The Quaker Girl in 1910, The Dancing Mistress in 1912, and The Girl on the Film and The Girl from Utah, both in 1913.

Tanner continued to work for Edwardes up to his death in London on 18 June 1915. He is buried with his family in Brookwood Cemetery.
