= The Girl in the Taxi (disambiguation) =

The Girl in the Taxi is a stage musical that premiered in 1912 in London.

The Girl in the Taxi may also refer to:

- The Girl in the Taxi (1921 film), an American film
- The Girl in the Taxi (1926 film), a German film
- The Girl in the Taxi (1937 film), a British film
- The Girl in the Taxi (play), a musical farce that premiered in 1910 on Broadway
