= Brandram =

Brandram is a surname. Notable people with the surname include:

- Lady Katherine Brandram (1913–2007), Greek-British aristocrat
- Richard Brandram (1911–1994), British Army officer and husband of Princess Katherine of Greece and Denmark
- Rosina Brandram (1845–1907), English opera singer and actress
- Samuel Brandram (1824–1892), English barrister
