= Albert Henry Collings =

English painter

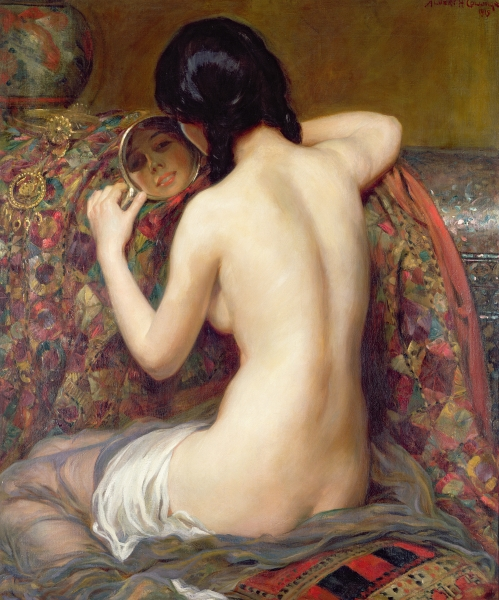
A reflection

Albert Henry Collings, RBA (1868 – 6 May 1947) was an English artist most notable for his portraiture.

== Life and work ==
Collings was born, trained, and lived all his life in London. Working in oils, water-colour, and pastel, he specialised in figure subjects and portraits, for which he received a number of official commissions. He exhibited for many years at the Royal Society of British Artists, showing a total of 98 works and being elected a member in 1897. He also supported the Royal Academy (29 works, 1896–1938) and the Royal Institute of Painters in Water Colours, and showed at the Paris Salon, where he was awarded a gold medal for a portrait in 1907.

In 1911 Collings painted in oils the portrait of the Unionist MP for East Herts, Mr Abel Smith, which was presented to Abel Smith by his friends.

A picture by Collings exhibited at the Brighton Museum & Art Gallery in 1926 attracted attention in The Times reporting:

A curious – and complimentary – little sidelight on the Autumn Exhibition of specially invited works at the Public Art Galleries, Brighton, is thrown by the intrusive effect of Coquette by Mr Albert H. Collings. It is not by any means a bad picture, and in most companies the provocative damsel in her Spanish shawl would be welcome, but somehow here she strikes a note a little too high.

Examples of his portraiture are at Harrow and in the Theatre Royal, Drury Lane, and Portsmouth Town Hall; but his work is now rare.

Painted the portrait of J.A.Harrison hon. secretary of The Eccentric Club in 1929.

Collings was a member of The Savage Club.

He exhibited at the Royal Society of British Artists what was dubbed 'a pretty head' by The Times' art critic in 1909.

== Exhibitions ==
- Arlington Gallery, Bond Street, London - 1934

== Gallery ==
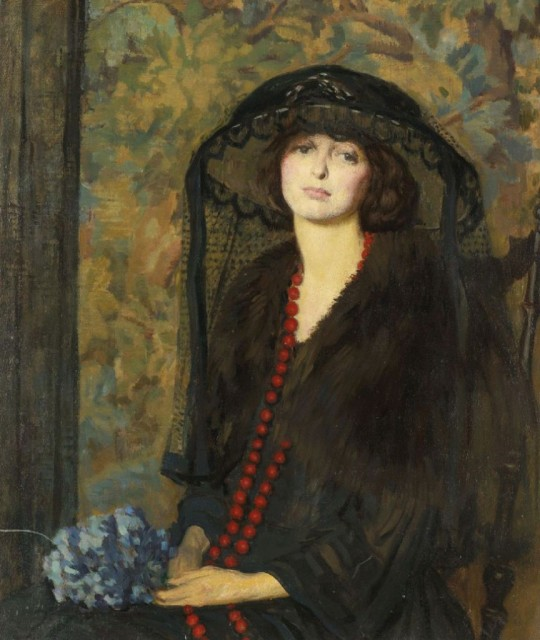
Portrait of a woman

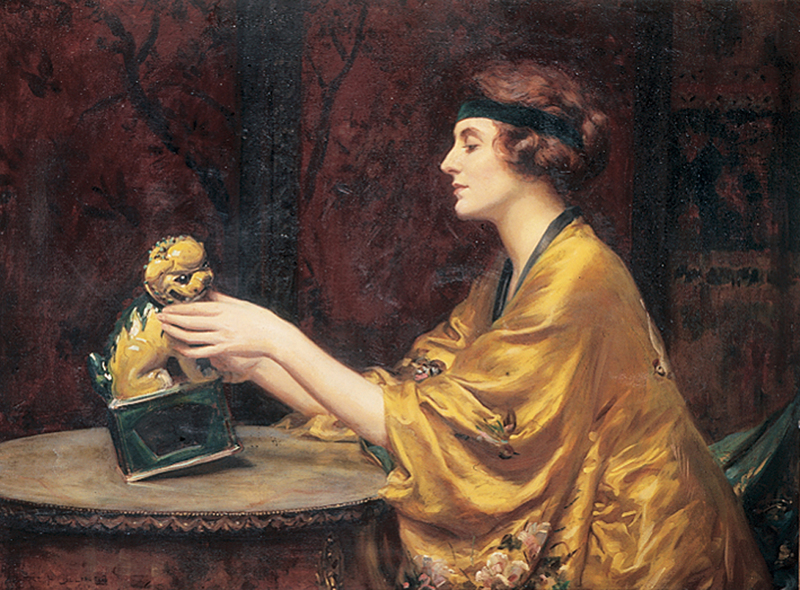
Kimono and Kylin

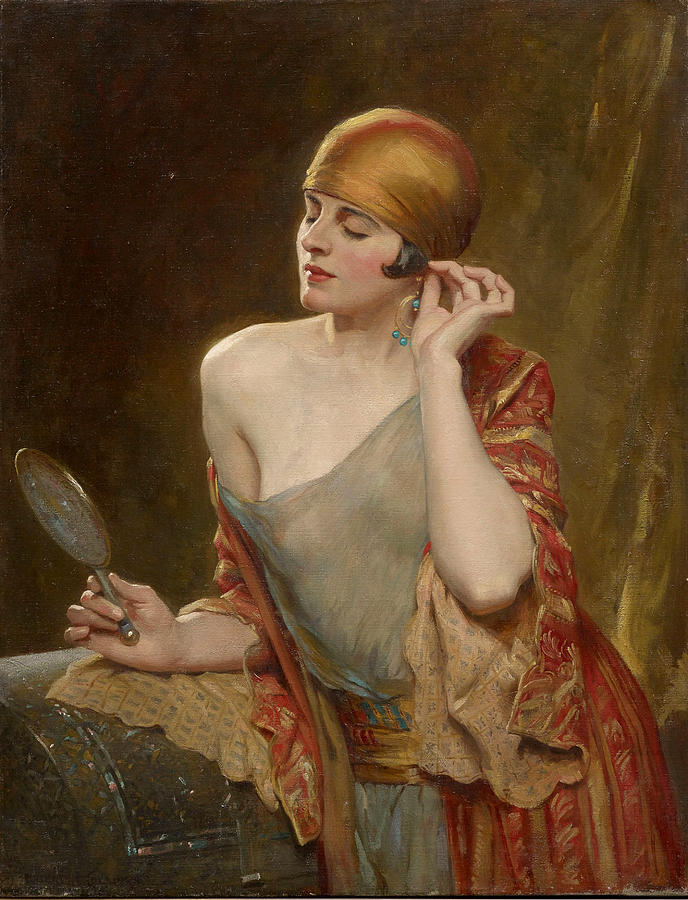
The studio mirror

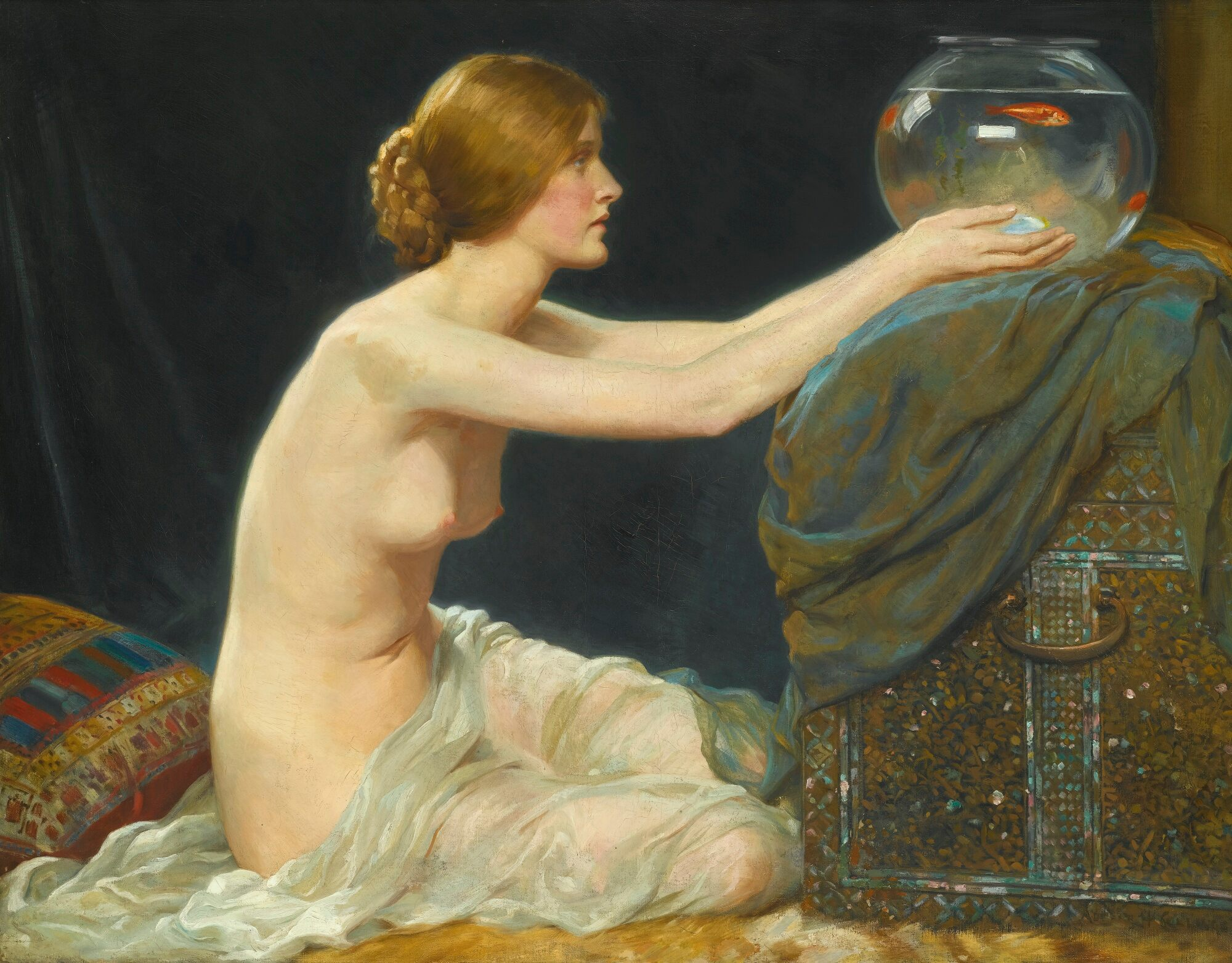
The Fish Bowl

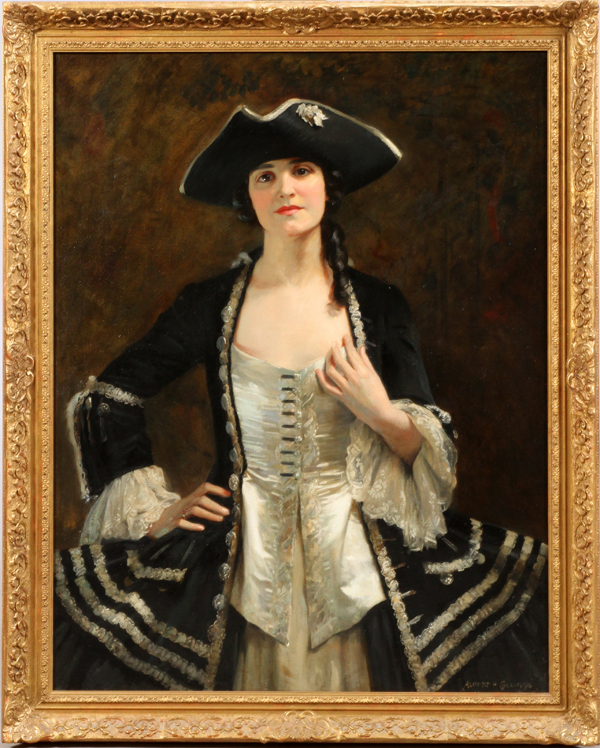
Corsaire

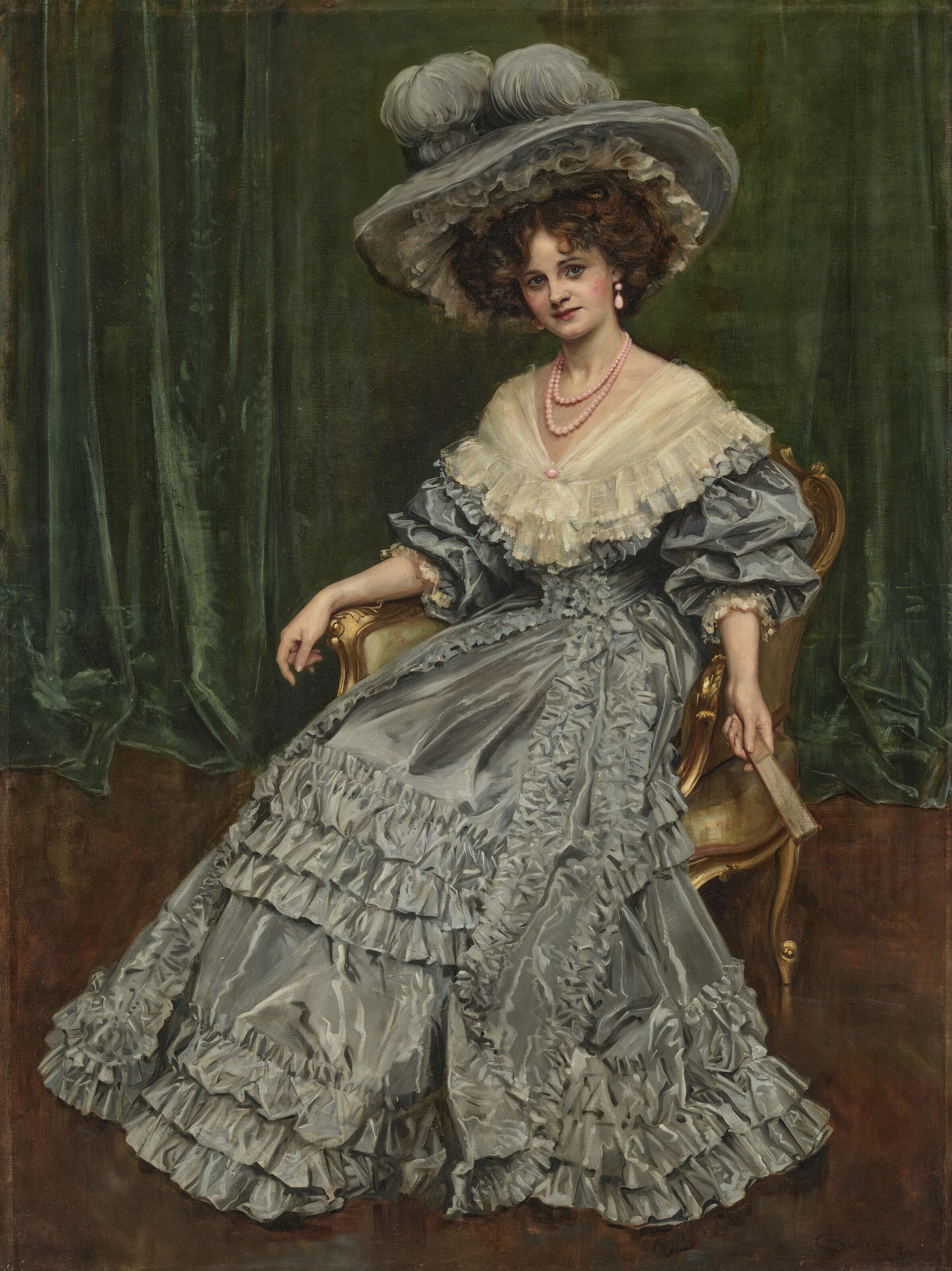
Portrait of Gertie Millar, 1905
