= Phyllis Dare =

English actress and singer (1890–1975)

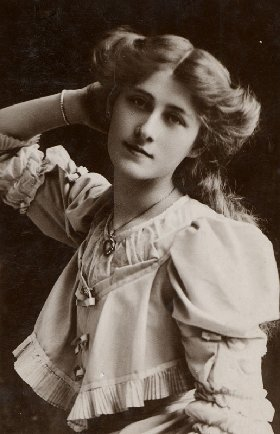
- Dare c. 1906
- Born: Phyllis Constance Haddie Dones; 15 August 1890; Chelsea, London, England
- Died: 27 April 1975 (aged 84); Brighton, Sussex, England
- Occupations: Actress, singer
- Years active: 1899–1951
- Relatives: Zena Dare (sister)

Phyllis Dare (born Phyllis Constance Haddie Dones; 15 August 1890 – 27 April 1975) was an English actress and singer famous for her performances in Edwardian musical comedy and other musical theatre in the first half of the 20th century.

Born in Chelsea, London, Dare first performed on stage at the age of nine, in the Christmas pantomime Babes in the Wood (1899), together with her sister, Zena. Later that year, she appeared as Little Christina in Ib and Little Christina. She soon played Mab in the Seymour Hicks musical Bluebell in Fairyland, and at the age of 15, she took over the starring role of Angela in The Catch of the Season.

In 1909, Dare created the role of Eileen Cavanagh in the hit musical The Arcadians, where she met the producer George Edwardes. This started a long association between the two, who collaborated on productions including The Girl in the Train, Peggy and The Quaker Girl. In 1912, she starred in The Sunshine Girl. In 1913 she joined the cast of The Dancing Mistress, as Nancy Joyce, at the Adelphi Theatre and continued to star in successful productions throughout the 1920s, including in the role of Mariana in The Lady of the Rose (1922).

During her later career, she turned to straight plays, some of which included Aren't We All in 1929, Words and Music in 1932 and The Fugitives in 1936. She appeared occasionally in films, starring in The Argentine Tango and Other Dances in 1913, Dr. Wake's Patient in 1916, Crime on the Hill in 1933 and Debt of Honour in 1936. In the 1940s she appeared in a tour of Full House and was later cast in Other People's Houses. In 1949, Dare opened as Marta the mistress in Ivor Novello's musical, King's Rhapsody. The show ran for two years and was Dare's last theatrical endeavour. She retired to Brighton in 1951 and died 27 April 1975 at the age of 84.

== Life and career ==
Dare was born in Chelsea, London. Her father, Arthur Albert Dones, was a divorce clerk, and her mother was Harriette Amelia Wheeler. Dare was the youngest of three children. Her sister, Zena, three and a half years her senior, also became a well-known musical comedy actress. They had a brother named Jack.

=== Early career ===
Dare as a child actress

Dare's first performance on stage was in 1899, at the age of nine, in the Christmas pantomime Babes in the Wood at the Coronet Theatre in London. Her sister Zena was also cast in this production, and they both adopted the surname of Dare. The next year, Phyllis was cast as Little Christina in a production of Ib and Little Christina at the Prince of Wales's Theatre, the same year repeating the role at the Coronet Theatre, and she ended the year in the Christmas pantomime Little Red Riding Hood in Manchester. In 1901, she played one of the children in The Wilderness, and Seymour Hicks and Ellaline Terriss cast her as Mab in their musical Bluebell in Fairyland. The following Christmas, she performed in a production of The Forty Thieves.

as Eileen in The Arcadians

Dare took a few years off to concentrate on her studies. During this period, in March 1903, she received a marriage proposal from Lord Dalmeny. His family did not approve and had the young nobleman rapidly shipped off to Scotland. When her sister Zena received a proposal from Maurice Brett, the second son of Lord Esher, his family approved, and the two married in 1911.

She was Charley, one of the Babes in the Babes in the Wood, at the Theatre Royal, Birmingham (1904–05). Later in 1905, just after her fifteenth birthday, Dare took over the starring role of Angela in The Catch of the Season from Terriss. The role had been created by Dare's sister Zena. Dare next appeared in a pantomime of Cinderella in Newcastle. She left the stage abruptly and travelled to a Belgian convent to continue her studies. A rumour, originated by a Frederick Henry Wolfries, circulated that her sudden departure was a result of a pregnancy and that Terriss's husband, Seymour Hicks, was the hypothetical father; Hicks received written and verbal abuse for his alleged conduct. In November 1906, Wolfries appeared at the Liverpool Assizes accused of libelling Hicks, while passing himself off as Dare's brother. He was found guilty and sentenced to 8 months imprisonment. Dare returned to London with her father in haste in 1906 to take over the title role, at age 16 and on short notice, of Julia Chaldicott, in The Belle of Mayfair when Edna May left the cast at the Vaudeville Theatre.

=== Star of musicals ===
as Peggy, 1911

In 1907, Dare published her autobiography From School to Stage. In the same year, she starred as the Sandow Girl in a provincial tour of The Dairymaids and again starred in the Christmas pantomime Cinderella. In 1908, Dare returned to The Dairymaids at the Adelphi Theatre for two months. At the same theatre, she reprised her role as Cinderella.

In 1909, Dare created the role of Eileen Cavanagh in the hit musical The Arcadians at the Original Shaftesbury Theatre. A review from Playgoer and Society Illustrated noted, "Miss Phyllis Dare does everything that is expected of her; she dances nicely, sings sweetly and looks pretty...." This was an extraordinarily long-running musical, playing for 809 performances, and Dare stayed for the entire run. The musical marked the beginning of Dare's association with producer George Edwardes, and she went on to star in several more of his productions in the next three years, including The Girl in the Train at the Vaudeville Theatre (1910, as Gonda van der Loo), Peggy at the Gaiety Theatre (1911, as Peggy), The Quaker Girl in Paris (1911, as Prudence) and The Sunshine Girl at the Gaiety and then on tour (1912–13, as Delia Dale). She left The Sunshine Girl in 1913 to join the cast of The Dancing Mistress, as Nancy Joyce, at the Adelphi Theatre.

Dare began to develop a relationship with the composer Paul Rubens. He had written the music for The Sunshine Girl and The Dairymaids, and they became acquainted. He would write the music for her next series of shows, including The Girl from Utah at the Adelphi (1913, as Dora Manners), Miss Hook of Holland at the Prince of Wales's (1914 revival, as Sally Hook) and Tina at the Adelphi (1915, as Tina). He also dedicated his most famous song, "I Love the Moon" to her. During the run of Tina, Dare became engaged to Rubens. Their engagement ended when Rubens became very ill with consumption. He died in 1917 at the age of 41.

=== Later years ===
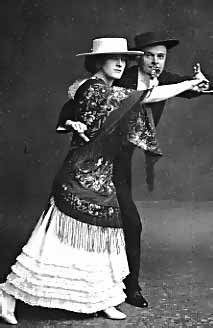
Grossmith and Dare in The Sunshine Girl

Dare performed on stage rarely for the next few years, appearing in Hanky-Panky at the Empire Theatre in 1917. She returned to the stage in 1919 as Lucienne Touquet in Kissing Time at the Winter Garden and then played Princess Badr-al-budur in Aladdin in 1920 at the Hippodrome, London. She continued to star in successful productions throughout the 1920s, including as Mariana in The Lady of the Rose at Daly's Theatre (1922), as Yvette in The Street Singer (1924; 360 performances at the Lyric Theatre and on tour), and as Fay Blake in Rodgers and Hart's Lido Lady at the Gaiety Theatre (1926), in which she introduced the song "Atlantic Blues." She then turned to straight plays. Some of these included Aren't We All (1929) Words and Music (1932), and The Fugitives (1936).

Dare also appeared in a few films including The Argentine Tango and Other Dances (1913), Dr. Wake's Patient (1916), The Common Law (1923), Crime on the Hill (1933), Debt of Honour (1936), Marigold (1938) and Gildersleeve on Broadway (1943). A thoroughbred horse was named after Dare in 1920.

In 1940, for the first time in over four decades, Zena and Phyllis Dare shared the stage, in a tour of Full House, in which Dare played Lola Leadenhall. In 1941–42, she was Juliet Maddock in Other People's Houses, and in 1946 she played the Marchioness of Mereston in Lady Frederick at the Savoy Theatre. In 1949, Dare opened as Marta the mistress in Ivor Novello's musical, King's Rhapsody, again with her sister Zena. The show ran for two years and was Dare's last theatrical endeavour.

Dare retired to Brighton, England, at the age of 61, where she died at the age of 84. Her sister had died only six weeks earlier.
