= The Girl from Utah =

Phyllis Dare as Dora Manners

The Girl from Utah is an Edwardian musical comedy in two acts with music by Paul Rubens, and Sidney Jones, a book by James T. Tanner, and lyrics by Adrian Ross, Percy Greenbank and Rubens. The story concerns an American girl who runs away to London to avoid becoming a wealthy Mormon's newest wife. The Mormon follows her to England, but she is rescued from a bigamous marriage by a handsome actor.

The piece opened at the Adelphi Theatre in London on 18 October 1913 and had an initial run of 195 performances. An American version was produced by Charles Frohman that had a successful run of 140 performances at the Knickerbocker Theatre, opening on August 24, 1914. Frohman hired the young Jerome Kern to write five new songs for the score together with lyricist Herbert Reynolds to strengthen what he felt was a weak first act. Julia Sanderson and Donald Brian starred in the production. Their song "They Didn't Believe Me" became a hit. The musical also toured in other countries, including South Africa, Australia and New Zealand.

"They Didn't Believe Me", with its conversational style and modern 4/4 time signature instead of the older waltz style, put Kern in great demand on Broadway and established a pattern for musical comedy love songs that lasted through the 1960s. It became a standard and has been recorded by many artists. A recording of a concert performance of the show is available from the Comic Opera Guild.

== Roles and original cast ==
- Lord Amersham – Alfred De Manby
- Policeman P.R.38 – Albert Sims
- Colonel Oldham-Pryce – Douglas Marrs
- Page – Michael Matthews
- Commissionaire – David Hallam
- Detective Shooter (of Scotland Yard) – F. W. Russell
- Lord Orpington – Harold Latham
- Archie Tooth – William Bambridge
- Douglas Noel – Harry R. Drummond
- Bobbie Longshot – Sydney Laine
- Trimmit (Of Brixton Rise) – Edmund Payne
- Sandy Blair (Leading man at the Folly Theatre) – Joseph Coyne
- Una Trance (The Girl from Utah) – Ina Claire
- Clancy (Miss Manners's maid) – Gracie Leigh
- Lady Amersham (Lord Amersham's mother) – Bella Graves
- Actresses At The Folly Theatre – Heather Featherstone, Gertie White, Dorothy Devere, Kitty Kent, Isobel Elsom and Queenie Vincent
- A Waitress – Gladys Kurton
- Lady Muriel Chepstowe – Cynthia Murray
- Hon. Miss St. Aubyn – Valerie Richards
- Lady Mary Nowell – Helen Rae
- Mrs. Ponsonby – Beatrice Guiver
- Dora Manners (Leading lady at the Folly Theatre) – Phyllis Dare

== Musical numbers ==
Act I - Dumpelmeyers.

- No. 1 - Chorus - "Have you booked our table, Number Four?"
- No. 2 - Lord Amersham (to Lady Amersham) - "There's a little maid, and I dream about her everywhere I go"
- No. 3 - Chorus and Entrance of Actresses - "Oh, what a party is coming to tea now!"
- No. 4 - Dora & Chorus - "Truthful men, you are hard to find - lovers, husbands or brothers"
- No. 5 - Sandy - "I remember quite clearly the time I was born, it was one gloomy day in December"
- No. 6 - Clancy & Trimmit - "I've had enough of this very swagger place, I feel that I'm quite de trop"
- No. 7 - Una & Chorus - "Where do you think I've come from?..."
- No. 8 - Una, Dora, Clancy, & Sandy - "I know a Mormon who wants to marry me"
- No. 9 - Dora & Trimmit - "Heart of my heart, life would be blank were we to part"
- No. 10 - Una & Sandy - "If my cunning foes lay traps about, well, I may get caught some day"
- No. 11 - Finale Act I - "We really must go; we've taken, we know, a terrible time for tea"

Scene from Act II

Act II - Scene 1 - A Street in Brixton.

- No. 12 - Barcarolle - Dora, Clancy, Amersham, Trimmit & Sandy - "Where can Una, Una, poor little Una be?"

Act II - Scene 2 - A Mormon's House.

- No. 13 - Una & Girls - "In the street, down below, there's a voice that I seem to know"
- No. 14 - Una, Sandy & Trimmit - "Oh, the front door's bolted and the front door's barred, so we can't get along out"

Act II - Scene 3 - The Arts Ball.

- No. 15 - Chorus - "It's the Ball of the Arts, quite a feast of fancy dress"
- No. 16 - Dora & Chorus - "If you're a girl and on the stage you go, you'll think it lovely for a month or so"
- No. 17 - Clancy - "I belong to the Emerald Isle, and the Emerald Isle's all right"
- No. 18 - Tango
- No. 19 - Waltz - Una & Sandy - "It is hard just to say what's the right time of day"
- No. 20 - Trimmit & Chorus - "Oh, if you come to Brixton there are lots of sights to see"
- No. 21 - Dora & Amersham - "When two hearts in perfect harmony sing a song of love"
- No. 22 - Russian Dance
- No. 23 - Una, Dora, Clancy, & Men (whistling) - "Our Dear Little Friends, the Ladies"
- No. 24 - Finale Act II - "She's a girl from Utah, in the U.S.A., but on an early day she'll marry dandy Sandy!"
