= Carl Kiefert =

German-British conductor and composer

Carl Johann Kiefert (also Johann Carl; 1855 – 26 November 1937) was a German-British conductor and composer, who spent much of his career conducting at the Hippodrome and other London theatres. He was the musical director of the original London productions of such musical theatre pieces as His Excellency (1894), An Artist's Model (1895), Florodora (1899) and The Quaker Girl (1910).

== Biography ==
Kiefert was born in Germany to a German father and French-born mother. His father was a music master in the 19th Field Artillery Regiment of the German Army. He was educated at the Universities of Cologne and Göttingen. He first came to Britain at 22 years old as a cellist with the Meiningen Ensemble, performing at the Theatre Royal, Drury Lane.

Kiefert spent much of his career conducting at the London Hippodrome and other London theatres. He was the musical director of the original London productions of such musical theatre pieces as His Excellency (1894), An Artist's Model (1895), Florodora (1899) and The Quaker Girl (1910).

He also wrote songs, arranged dance music from shows and wrote or co-wrote the scores to several London musicals, including The Ballet Girl (1897) and The Gay Grisette (1898). He orchestrated several West End musicals early in the 20th century, especially those of Lionel Monckton, and later several Broadway musicals, including Honeydew (1920) and The Chiffon Girl (1924). "His acknowledged expertise and speed at instrumentation made Kiefert the most sought-after arranger of theatre scores and he regularly orchestrated for Lionel Monckton and Osmond Carr."

== Later life ==
In 1914, Kiefert moved to New York with his wife, Priscilla Leach, and daughter Emily, but returned to the UK in 1925. He suffered a stroke in 1928 and died nine years later in Barnham, Sussex, aged 82.
