= Laura Guerite =

Musical theatre and vaudeville performer

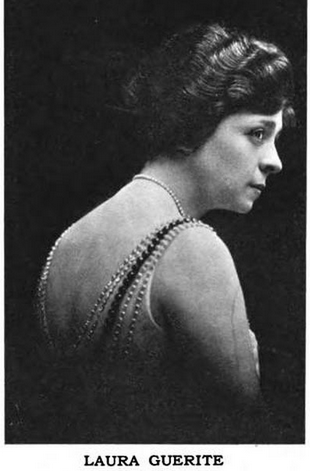
- Guerite, from a 1916 publication
- Born: Laura Leon Garrett; March 3, 1879; Chicago, Illinois, US
- Died: February 2, 1947 (aged 67); Los Angeles, California, US
- Other names: Laura Guérite, Laura Guerite Parker, Laura Garrett Craig
- Occupations: Musical theatre and vaudeville performer
- Years active: 1904–1930s

Laura Guerite (born Laura Leon Garrett; March 3, 1879 – February 2, 1947) was an American actress, dancer, singer, comedian, playwright, and vaudeville performer. She was also an enthusiastic boatwoman and a licensed pilot.

== Early life ==
Laura Leon Garrett was born in Chicago, Illinois, the daughter of Lawrence Garrett and Julia M. Jardee Garrett. Her father was a sailor on the Great Lakes. She was sometimes described as French by birth, an impression she may have encouraged with the respelling of her surname. Her maternal grandparents were from France and Switzerland; her paternal grandparents were Canadian.

Film actress Clara Kimball Young was Guerite's niece, the daughter of her sister Pauline Garrette Kimball.

== Career ==
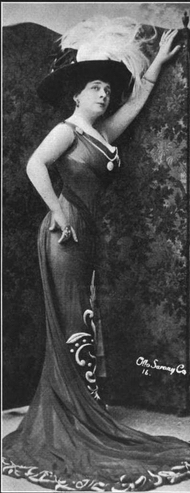
Laura Guerite, from a 1908 publication

Guerite's stage credits included roles in Mr. Wix of Wickham (1904), The Gay White Way (1907–1908), The Orchid (1907–1908), Mr. Hamlet of Broadway (1908–1909), A Broken Idol (1909), Dick Whittington (1910), Get Busy with Emily (1910), The Girl in the Taxi (1910), and Peg O' My Heart (1917).

She went on an extended world tour from 1914 to 1923. In London she appeared in the revue Oh! La! La! (1915–1916). In the 1930s, she was performing in vaudeville, variety and cabaret shows in Singapore and India.

She was known for her "Salome" dance in a minimal gauzy costume. She designed her own gowns and wore the "latest Parisian creations", as reported in the entertainment press: "Miss Guerite need never hesitate to don any costume that shows the grace of her lines, for she has undoubtedly one of the best figures on the American stage." She contributed a recipe for preparing Brussels sprouts and chestnuts to a 1918 actors' cookbook, to raise funds for war relief.

She wrote a one-act play, The Flivver (1916).

== Boats and planes ==
Guerite was known for her interest in automobiles, boats, and airplanes. In 1910, Guerite, her husband, actress Edna Wallace Hopper and two others ran their motor boat, named the Laura G., aground at Little Hell Gate and almost sank. Two years later, again in her namesake motor boat, she and another actress, Rose Parnett, interrupted their tennis game to rescue thirteen men from a foundering yacht, the Count, in Flushing Bay.

By 1917, Guerite had a pilot's license and was flying a stunt plane over a fundraising show at the Sheepshead Bay Speedway. In 1921 and 1922, she flew an airplane over Adelaide and Melbourne, while she was touring in Australia. She designed her own aviation costume too. "I wish I could wear trousers all the time," she explained of her practical aviator gear, "Women are adopting them all over England and France. It would be dangerous to wear skirts when flying."

== Personal life ==
Laura Guerite married businessman John J. Parker in 1904. She was married a second time by 1922, to H. M. Craig. Laura Garrett Craig died in 1947, aged 67, in Los Angeles, California. Her gravesite is in Glendale, California.
