= The Orchid (musical) =

Edwardian musical comedy

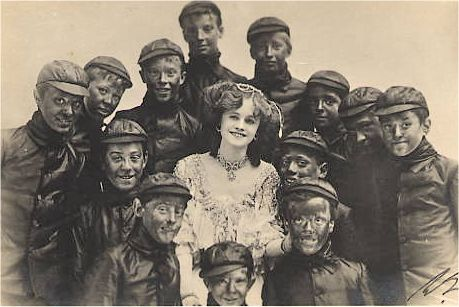
Millar, as Violet, and boys

The Orchid is an Edwardian musical comedy in two acts with music by Ivan Caryll and Lionel Monckton, a book by James T. Tanner, lyrics by Adrian Ross and Percy Greenbank, and additional numbers by Paul Rubens. The story concerns marital mix-ups and the quest of a wealthy man for a $2,000 Peruvian orchid to be sent to France. When foul play keeps the flower from reaching its destination, it is discovered that a nearly identical orchid is growing in the garden of the horticultural college.

The musical premiered in London in 1903. A Broadway production followed in 1907.

== Productions ==
The Orchid opened on 26 October 1903 at London's Gaiety Theatre and ran for 559 performances. It starred Gertie Millar, Gabrielle Ray, Harry Grattan, Edmund Payne and George Grossmith, Jr. It was the first show produced at the renovated Gaiety Theatre. King Edward VII and Queen Alexandra both attended the opening night. Some of the show's most successful songs were "Liza Ann", "Little Mary", "Pushful" and "Fancy Dress".

Frank Smithson directed the Broadway production, which opened at the Herald Square Theatre on 8 April 1907. It ran for 178 performances, during which time the production transferred to the Casino Theatre. It closed there on 14 September 1907. It then went on a lengthy and successful tour of the United States. It was produced by brothers Lee and Sam S. Shubert and choreographed by William Rock. The production used a revised book by Joseph W. Herbert; the character of Meakin in particular was highly altered for the actor Eddie Foy, including changing the name to "Artie Choke". Herbert also created a new part for himself, the boxer and wrestler Toby Blockett. Only 12 of the musical numbers created by Caryll and Mockton were used, and the production interpolated several songs by American songwriters, including Jerome Kern, Hugo Frey, Seymour Furth and E. Ray Goetz, among others. The cast also included Trixie Friganza as Caroline, Amelia Stone as Lady Violet, Laura Guerite as Zelie, George C. Boniface, Jr. as Aubrey, Melville Ellis as Ronald, and Alfred Hickman as Guy.

== Synopsis ==
- Setting: Countess of Barwick's Horticultural College and the Square and Opera House at Nice, France

Guy Scrymgeour is in love with Josephine Zaccary, but their union is opposed by his uncle, the rich and influential Mr. Chesterton, because she is the daughter of a mere orchid hunter. Meanwhile, a penniless young physician, Ronald Fausset, loves Lady Violet Anstruther. The two couples wed secretly, but the Registrar switches the names on the marriage certificates, so that Guy is joined to Lady Violet, and Ronald to Josephine.

Chesterton founds a horticultural college and sends Zaccary (Josephine's father) to Peru to seek a special $2,000 orchid, the orchid of his dreams. Zaccary is supposed to take the flower to Nice, France, for a competitive exhibition. However, Zaccary is unreliable and goes to Paris instead, in search of flowers of the human variety. Fortunately, it is discovered that Meakin, the gardener at the horticultural college, is growing a nearly identical orchid.

== Roles and original cast ==
Fausset, Violet, Meakin, Josephine and Guy in the Wedding Dance

- Lady Violet Anstruther (principal pupil at the horticultural college) – Gertie Millar
- Caroline Twining (of a matrimonial turn) – Connie Ediss
- Zelie Rumbert (an adventuress) – Hilda Jacobson
- Thisbe (private secretary to Mr. Chesterton) – Gabrielle Ray
- Countess Anstruther (Violet's mother) – Phyllis Blair
- Billy (Dr. Fausset's "Buttons") – Lydia West
- Lady Warden (of the horticultural college) – Gertrude Aylward
- Josephine Zaccary (pupil teacher at the horticultural college) – Ethel Sydney
- The Hon. Guy Scrymgeour (Mr. Chesterton's nephew) – George Grossmith, Jr.
- Dr. Ronald Fausset (a country practitioner) – Lionel Mackinder
- Mr. Aubrey Chesterton (Minister of Commerce, and Guy's uncle) – Harry Grattan
- Comte Raoul De Cassignat (of the Quai d'Orsay) – Robert Nainby
- Zaccary (a professional orchid hunter) – Fred Wright, junr.
- M. Frontenbras, M. Merignac (Comte Raoul's seconds) – George Gregory and Charles A. Brown
- Registrar – Arthur Hatherton
- Master Of Ceremonies – Will Bishop
- M. D'auville (French minister of state) – H. Lewis
- Meakin (gardener at the horticultural college) – Edmund Payne
- Debutantes

== Musical numbers ==
Thisbe and Chesterton

Act I – The Countess of Barwick's Horticultural College

- No. 1. Chorus – "This high horticultural college is formed with the excellent plan"
- No. 2. Thisbe & Chorus – "A statesman in the Cabinet wants plenty of assistance"
- No. 3. Jo & Chorus – "If I could be a girl in high society, whose pedigree included a peer or two"
- No. 4. Meakin & Chorus – "You amateurs who try to run a garden"
- No. 5. Jo, Lady Violet, Guy, Ronald & Meakin – "For a stylish and up-to-date wedding"
- No. 6. Débutantes – "Come! come! come! Come for confidential talks in the arbours and the walks"
- No. 7. Chesterton & Chorus – "From the start of my existence I was noted for persistence"
- No. 8. Lady Violet, Jo, Guy & Ronald – "Our marriage lines! our marriage lines! The magic in those simple signs"
- No. 9. Caroline & Meakin – "The cuckoo is calling aloud to his mate, the turtle dove coos in its nest"
- No. 10. Chorus – "Now the speechifying's done, and the prizes we have won have been given"
- No. 11. Zaccary & Chorus – "I've travelled far where panthers are that jump on you and catch you!"
- No. 12. Caroline & Chorus – "I was tired of living single, never putting up the banns"
- No. 13. Finale Act I – "What a most romantic history! Solving all the recent mystery! Violet has played the run-away"

Act II – Various locations in Nice: Black Massena, Promenade des Anglais, & Interior of the Opera House

Connie Ediss (left) with Edmund Payne, George Grossmith, Jr. and Gertie Millar

- No. 14. horus – "Up and down, over the town, motley and merriment speed along."
- No. 14a. Pas de Trois
- No. 15. Caroline & Chorus – "I've a passion for fancy dress, more or less!"
- No. 16. Lady Violet & Chorus – "There's a certain little lady who's already known to fame as Little Mary"
- No. 17. Guy & Meakin – "We're true British labourers honest and free, but, alas, we are both unemployed"
- No. 18. Zaccary & Chorus – "I'm monarch of many a million, especially put in francs"
- No. 19. Ronald & Jo – "I never was so thoroughly wretched and sad in all my life"
- No. 20. Lady Violet & Zaccary – "There's a Yorkshire town, very bleak and brown, where your life is not too gay"
- No. 21. Guy – "There's a charming little lady who's a patron of the play"
- No. 22. Jo – "I've been waiting for some sort of sign that you want this little heart of mine"
- No. 23. Chorus – "We are going to the Ball all in white"
- No. 24. Thisbe – "There's a girl I want you all to know, Rose-a-Rubie is her name"
- No. 25. Octet – "Oh dear! have you heard of it? There's a ball we ought to see"
- No. 26. Chorus – Bal Blanc – "Carnival is nearly ended, now we drop our colours splendid"
- No. 27. Jo & Guy, with Chorus – "When I go to a ball, although I'm the keenest of the dancers"
- No. 28. Lady Violet & Chorus – "When I was extremely small, only three or four"
- No. 29. Ronald – "There are lots of fellows in the world today, but ther're very few about like me"
- No. 30. Finale Act II – "At the fancy, fancy ball, happiness has come to all"
