= Our Miss Gibbs =

Musical

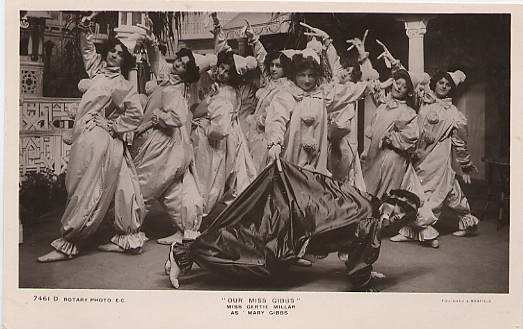
The cast of Our Miss Gibbs

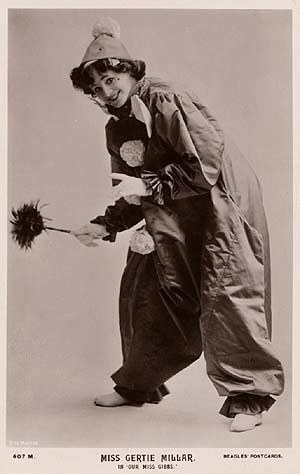
Gertie Millar as Mary Gibbs dressed as Pierrot

Our Miss Gibbs is an Edwardian musical comedy in two acts by 'Cryptos' and James T. Tanner, with lyrics by Adrian Ross and Percy Greenbank, music by Ivan Caryll and Lionel Monckton. Produced by George Edwardes, it opened at the Gaiety Theatre in London on 23 January 1909 and ran for an extremely successful 636 performances. It starred Gertie Millar, Edmund Payne and George Grossmith, Jr. The young Gladys Cooper played the small role of Lady Connie, with Jean Rhys in the chorus.

The show also had a short Broadway run in 1910. It was revived at the Finborough Theatre, London, in May 2006. This was the first professional London production since 1910. The piece was regularly revived by amateur theatre groups, particularly in Britain, from the 1920s into the 1950s but it has been produced only rarely since then. Our Miss Gibbs was revived by the Lyric Theatre in July and August 2011 at the Mountain View Center for the Performing Arts and the Lesher Center for the Arts in Walnut Creek, California. The revival featured a cast of 22 and a 9-piece orchestra.

== Roles and original cast ==
- The Hon. Hughie Pierrepoint (An Amateur Criminal) – George Grossmith, Jr.
- Slithers (A Professional Crook) – Robert Hale
- Mr. Toplady (Manager at Garrod's) – Arthur Hatherton
- Lord Eynsford (In Love with Mary) – J. Edward Fraser
- Mr. Amalfy (The Director-General of the White City) – H. B. Burcher
- Timothy Gibbs (Mary's Yorkshire Cousin) – Edmund Payne
- Lady Elizabeth Thanet (Engaged to Lord Eynsford) – Denise Orme
- Madame Jeanne (Modiste at Garrod's) – Jean Aylwin
- Mrs. Farquhar (An Impecunious Woman of Fashion) – Maisie Gay
- Lady Connie – Gladys Cooper
- Miss Gibbs (Mary) – Gertie Millar
- Lady Sybil Julia James - Blanche Stocker

== Synopsis ==
George Grossmith, Jr. as Hughie

Act I

Mary Gibbs is a Yorkshire lass who, in 1908, has found work at Garrods in London as a shop girl, selling candy. The young men are making themselves ill eating the sweets they buy to gain the attention of the beautiful, but no-nonsense Mary, who disapproves of their attempts at familiarity. Miss Gibbs has fallen in love with a young bank clerk who is actually the son of an Earl, Lord Eynsford, in disguise. His father would not consent to his marrying a shop girl. When she discovers that young Eynsford has lied to her, she breaks up with him.

Mary's cousin Timothy travels from Yorkshire to play in the town band for a contest at the Crystal Palace. He is a very unsophisticated country boy, and he has a variety of humorous big city adventures. Timothy gets entangled in a crime by mistakenly picking up a bag. Inside the bag is the Ascot Gold Cup (the trophy for Britain's most prestigious long-distance horse race). The cup has just been stolen by the Hon. Hughie Pierrepoint.

Act II

At the Franco-British Exhibition in White City, Timothy worries that the police will find him and accuse him of the crime. He disguises himself as a contestant in the Olympic marathon race. When he staggers into the stadium, he is mistakenly declared to be the winner. The Gold Cup is eventually recovered and returned to its owner, who is coincidentally Lord Eynsford. He is now so enchanted with Mary that he is eager for her to become his daughter-in-law, and all ends happily.

== Musical numbers ==
Act I - Garrod's Stores

- No. 1 - Chorus - "We'll be quick and do our shopping..."
- No. 2 - Eynsford - "There's a girl at the stores called Mary..."
- No. 3 - Bridesmaids - "We're the dear little ladies, selected..."
- No. 4 - Jeanne and Chorus of Girls - "Some people say success is won..."
- No. 5 - Betty - "Though I am not so unwilling..."
- No. 6 - Dudes - "A fashionable band of brothers are we..."
- No. 7 - Mary and Chorus of Dudes - "I'm a little Yorkshire lass..."
- No. 8 - Hughie and Chorus - "Though I'm a man of noble birth..."
- No. 9 - Mary and Timothy - "When the season's on the wane..."
- No. 10 - Mary and Hughie - "I will confess that as a man..."
- No. 11 - Concerted Number - "There's a City of palaces white..."
- No. 12 - Finale - Act I - "Saturday afternoon..."

Act II - Court of Honour at the Franco-British Exhibition

- No. 13 - Chorus and Entrance of Irish Girls - "Palaces oriental..."
- No. 14 - Mary - "Oh, London is really a wonderful town..."
- No. 15 - Hughie, Toplady, Slithers, Amalfy, Eynsford and Timothy - "Though something has upset me..."
- No. 16 - Betty and Chorus - "I am sure your education is not complete..."
- No. 17 - Concerted Number - "Push the pram for baby..."
- No. 18 - Mary and Timothy - "I'd like to tell you all about the farm..."
- No. 19 - Chorus and Solo Dance - "Over the dome and steeple..."
- No. 20 - Mary (dressed as Pierrot) and Chorus of Girls - "Moon, moon, mischief making moon..."
- No. 21 - Hughie and Timothy - "If you'll come down to my place..."
- No. 22 - Finale - Act II - "When country cousins come up to town..."

== Australian production ==
J.C. Williamson Ltd. presented the first Australian production of Our Miss Gibbs, which opened at Her Majesty's Theatre, Sydney on 24 September 1910 and was directed by Gerard Coventry. The English actress Blanche Browne played Miss Gibbs, with Langford Kirby as the Hon. Hughie Pierrepoint, Fred Leslie as Slithers and Bertie Wright as Timothy Gibbs. The young actress, Vera Pearce, then aged fifteen, also appeared and won early acclaim in what was a formative role in her career. In April 1911 the production reached its 200th performance, marked by the issue of a souvenir programme, which the Sunday Times reported as "a new Australian long-run record". The production became a staple of the J.C. Williamson repertoire and was revived by the firm in 1915, 1916 and 1917. It was again revived in 1933 starring Madge Elliott and Cyril Ritchard.

Reviewing the opening The Sydney Morning Herald called it "a typical Gaiety piece" and described the staging as "magnificently put on", with scenery by the J.C. Williamson firm's artists Little, Board and John "Jack" Gordon (son of scenic artist, George Gordon), who was responsible for a second-act table reproducing the Court of Honour at the Franco-British Exhibition (1908).
