= The Dancing Mistress =

Joseph Coyne and Gertie Millar with the Indian jewel

The Dancing Mistress is a musical comedy with music by Lionel Monckton, book by James T. Tanner and lyrics by Adrian Ross and Percy Greenbank. It depicts the fortunes of a school dancing mistress who is dismissed and finds fortune and happiness in Switzerland. The piece ran in the West End of London in 1912 and 1913, and toured the British provinces in 1914.

== History ==
The Dancing Mistress was presented by the impresario George Edwardes at the Royal Adelphi Theatre, opening on 19 October 1912. The piece, which followed the same composer's and authors' immensely successful The Quaker Girl, featured many of the performers from the earlier show, including the romantic leads, Gertie Millar and Joseph Coyne. It ran at the Adelphi until 21 June 1913.

A touring company presented the piece in the British provinces, with Adele Crispin, John T. MacCallum and Laura Wright in the leading roles of Nancy, Teddy and Virginie.

== Cast ==
Millar in Act II

- Widdicombe (butler at "Down House") – James Blakeley
- Lord Lyndale (otherwise Mr. Viner) – F. Pope Stamper
- Dubois (an adventurer financing the Baron) – D. J. Williams
- Baron Montalba – G. Carvey
- Berchili (manager of Grand Hôtel des Alpes) – Ivan Berlyn
- M. Rosemblum (a Banker) – Ernest A. Douglas
- Teddy Cavanagh (an aeroplanist) – Joseph Coyne
- Jeanie McTavish ("tuckwoman" at "Down House") – Gracie Leigh
- Mlle. Virginie Touchet (French mistress at "Down House") – Mlle. M. Caumont
- Bella Peach (daughter of an Argentine millionaire) – Elsie Spain
- Miss Pindrop (Principal of "Down House") – Agnes Thomas
- Lady Margrave – Maud Cressall
- Lili (a Parisienne) – Gina Palerme
- Nancy Joyce (dancing mistress of "Down House") – Gertie Millar

== Synopsis ==
Mlle. Caumont as Virginie

Act I

At a girls' school in Brighton on the south coast of England, the French mistress, Virginie Touchet, when not teaching French, surreptitiously indulges in an irresistible and ruinous addiction to gambling. She has befriended the young dancing teacher, Nancy Joye, under her wing. When Nancy uses her modest savings to help Virginie out, the latter promises her a huge reward if she wins the enormous cash prize with her latest "investment", a ticket for the Panama Lottery. The ticket wins, but nobody discovers the fact except for Widdicombe, the school butler, who throws over his previous lady-friend, Jeanie, the school's tuckwoman, and pursues Virginie.

Teddy Cavanagh is an aviator. In the course of his travels an Indian woman has given him a strange stone. In its normal state it is green, but when it is brought into contact with anyone who is passionately in love, it changes to red. When Teddy meets Nancy the stone rapidly goes from green to red. The austere headmistress, Miss Pindrop, does not like Nancy, and, finding her teaching her pupils a ragtime dance, she uses that as a pretext for dismissing her. Nancy is offered a post as teacher of dancing at a winter sports hotel in the Swiss mountains.

Act II

Teddy follows Nancy to Switzerland. His friend, Lord Lyndale travels out to join him. Virginie has also travelled out, pursued by Widdicombe, who is pursued by Jeanie. Also at the hotel is the villain of the piece, Baron Montalba, an old enemy of Teddy, and much enamoured of Nancy. To get Teddy out of the way, the Baron bets him that he cannot fly his aeroplane to London in two days, starting immediately. Teddy, taking Widdicombe as a witness, sets out, having sent the Indian jewel to Nancy, with a message asking her to wear it before he takes off, to show that his love for her is reciprocated. The Baron intercepts the jewel and substitutes for it a gorgeous necklace of diamonds.

Act III

At the Hotel Bristol in London, celebrations are in full swing for Virginie's (and Nancy's) windfall from the Panama Lottery. All misunderstandings are cleared up, the wicked Baron is foiled, and the lovers are united. The stone glows red for both of them.

== Musical numbers ==
Coyne and chorus in Act III

Act I

- No. 1. Chorus of Girls – "When Spring comes dancing over the hills..."
- No. 2. Bella and Chorus – "In girlhood's happy hours your fancy wanders gaily..."
- No. 3. Widdicombe and Chorus of Girls – "There's a wonderful fascination in the game of speculation..."
- No. 4. Bella, Jeanie, Lyndale and Widdicombe – "Oh, who will over the downs..."
- No. 5. Nancy – "When I was a little lass, being educated..."
- No. 6. The Dancing Lesson
- No. 7. Chorus – "Oh, it's so pleasant that you and we can meet at present for talk and tea..."
- No. 8. Nancy and Teddy – "As Fly-Away Jack soars up aloft upon his airy flight..."
- No. 9. Finale Act I – "Bella, you be bold now, have your fortune told now..."

Act II

- No. 10. Chorus of Skaters and Skiers – "Oh, it's ripping in Switzerland now..."
- No. 11. Jeanie – "I packed my wee bit bag and started awa' from Dover..."
- No. 12. Nancy and Teddy – "I'm busy here, and so I fear I can't spare you a minute..."
- No. 13. Lili and Chorus – "We've come to this country unknown..."
- No. 14. Baron and Chorus – "When you are in love, all the world is fair..."
- No. 15. Lynale, Teddy, Widdicombe, Baron and Dubois – "Though with rage and indignation you're aglow..."
- No. 16. Nancy – "Dear little snowflake, soft and white..."
- No. 17. Bella, Jeanie, Virginie, Lyndale, Widdicombe and Dubois – "I must go and pack now..."
- No. 18. Finale Act II – "We're coming tonight to look at the flight..."

Act III

- No. 19. Bella and Lyndale, with Chorus – "While we're dancing together..."
- No. 20. Teddy and Chorus – "Supposing a girl should drop me, and fancy another man..."
- No. 21. Jeanie and Widdicombe – "When I have married you, my dear, and you have married me..."
- No. 22. Cotillon – Polka and Two-Step
- No. 23. Finale Act III

== Critical reception ==
The Times thought the piece too long, and commented, "Mr. Lionel Monckton's songs call for no special comment, but they fulfil their purpose; and The Dancing Mistress, when trimmed and shaped, will make a very pleasant entertainment." The Illustrated London News thought more highly of Monckton's score, rating "that master of light melody … at his very best." The reviewer thought the show "full of gaiety and fun and colour." The Observer, like other papers, praised the performers ("so strong a combination as that is quite sure to fill the Adelphi for many months") and, like The Times, called for cuts.

Reviewing the touring production, The Manchester Guardian wrote, "There is no affectation about The Dancing Mistress … A waltz refrain, some dallying with rag-time, and a joke or two about Mr. Lloyd George help to assure the audience that they are not being trifled with and that nothing serious is intended."
