= The Girl in the Taxi (play) =

1910 musical comedy by Stanislaus Stange

- Music: Benjamin Hapgood Burt
- Lyrics: Benjamin Hapgood Burt
- Book: Stanislaus Stange
- Basis: Le Fils à papa
- Premiere: January 16, 1910: Cort Theatre, Chicago

The Girl in the Taxi is a three-act musical comedy written by Stanislaus Stange, with music by Benjamin Hapgood Burt. Set in New York City, it is one of several adaptations of Le Fils à papa, a French comedy by Antony Mars and Maurice Desvallières. The 1910 Broadway production was produced by Albert H. Woods and directed by Carter DeHaven; the latter of whom also performed the role of Bertie Stewart.

== Cast and characters ==
The characters and cast from the Broadway production are given below:

Broadway opening night cast
Character	Cast
Mariette	Jeannette Bageard
Mary Peters	Fremont Benton
John Stewart	Frederick Bond
Policeman	Joseph Clark
Percy Peters	Morgan Coman
Bertie Stewart	Carter De Haven
Walter Watson	Frank Farrington
Alexis	Max Freeman
Frederick Smith	John Glendinning
Mignon	Laura Guerite
Dr. Paul	Clifford Heckinger
Clara Stewart	Jessie Millward
Emile	Jerome Nelson
Rosie	Katherine Smythe
Mademoiselle Irma	Grace Walton

== History ==
Antony Mars and Maurice Desvallières wrote Le Fils à papa, a three-act French comedy, in 1906. In early 1910, English-American author Stanislaus Stange adapted the play into an English-language musical comedy with songs by composer Benjamin Hapgood Burt. (Note: Also in 1910, Le Fils à papa was separately adapted by Jean Gilbert into a German operetta called Die keusche Susanne (Chaste Susanne). In 1912, Frederick Fenn and Arthur Wimperis adapted the operetta to English as a musical, which was also called The Girl in the Taxi. In 1913, Mars and Desvallières adapted the operetta back into French as La chaste Suzanne.) Stange's adaptation premiered at the Cort Theatre in Chicago on January 16, 1910. After running in Chicago and Boston, The Girl in the Taxi appeared on Broadway at the Astor Theatre on October 24, 1910. It played there for six weeks with 48 performances.
