= Samuel Brandram =

English barrister (1824–1892)

Samuel Brandram (1824–1892) was an English barrister, known for his later career as a professional reciter of drama.

== Life ==
Born in London on 8 October 1824, he was the only son of William Caldwell Brandram. He was educated at Merchant Taylors' School, King's College School, and Trinity College, Oxford, where he graduated B.A. in 1846, and M.A. three years later. At university he was best known as an athlete, and also founded the initial Oxford Dramatic Society with Frank Talfourd. They performed typically at the Henley Regatta; Brandram danced in Talfourd's Macbeth Travestie in 1847.

After leaving Oxford Brandram became a student at Lincoln's Inn, and was called to the bar on 22 November 1850. He practised as a barrister till 1876, when for financial reasons he took work as a professional reciter, and became a popular performer. He had amateur experience to build on with the Canterbury Old Stagers and the Windsor Strollers, and had played with Albert Richard Smith and Edmund Yates among others. He gave whole or almost complete plays of Shakespeare, or Sheridan.

Brandram's theories on the brisk speaking of Shakespearian dramatic verse were influential on William Poel. While Brandram himself may be called a "forgotten eccentric", Poel was grateful enough to have raised funds for him, and his style of elocution formed part of Poel's drive to Shakespeare productions that were plainer and less self-consciously "poetic".

Brandram died at 6 Bentinck Street, Cavendish Square, Westminster, on 7 November 1892. He was buried three days later in the Richmond Old Burial Ground.

== Works ==
In 1881 Brandram published Selected Plays of Shakspeare, abridged for the use of the Young; it reached a fourth edition in 1892. Some passages were printed in full, joined by short narratives. In 1885 appeared Brandram's Speaker: a Set of Pieces in Prose and Verse suitable for Recitation, with an Introductory Essay on Elocution. It was reprinted (without the essay) in 1893, and in the same year he issued a further volume of Selections from Shakespeare.

== Family ==
Brandram married Julia Murray, an actress in Charles Kean's company, and had three sons and three daughters.

== Notes ==
Attribution

This article incorporates text from a publication now in the public domain: Lee, Sidney, ed. (1901). "Brandram, Samuel". Dictionary of National Biography (1st supplement). Vol. 1. London: Smith, Elder & Co.
