= Lionel Monckton =

British composer (1861–1924)

Lionel J. A. Monckton
- Born: 18 December 1861; London, England
- Died: 15 February 1924 (aged 62); London, England
- Resting place: Brompton Cemetery
- Occupations: Composer, songwriter, critic
- Spouse: Gertie Millar (m. 1902)

Lionel John Alexander Monckton (18 December 1861 – 15 February 1924) was an English composer of musical theatre. He became Britain's most popular composer of Edwardian musical comedy in the early years of the 20th century.

== Life and career ==
=== Early life ===
Monckton was born in London, the eldest son of the Town Clerk of London, Sir John Braddick Monckton, and Lady Monckton, the former Maria Louisa Long (1837–1920), an "enthusiastic amateur actress". His sister was Mrs Augusta Moore, who wrote popular novels as Martin J. Pritchard.

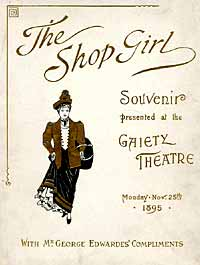
1st anniversary souvenir

He was educated at Charterhouse School and Oriel College at Oxford University, graduating in 1885. There he acted in college theatrical productions and composed music for productions of the Oxford University Dramatic Society, of which he was a founder, and the Phil-Thespian Club. He initially joined the legal profession at Lincoln's Inn and began to practise law, but gained part-time work as a songwriter and a theatre and music critic, first for the Pall Mall Gazette and later for the Daily Telegraph. His first theatre work was Mummies and Marriage, an operetta produced by amateurs in 1888. At the age of 29, in 1891, he finally managed to place the song "What will you have to Drink?", with lyrics by Basil Hood, in a professional musical burlesque called Cinder Ellen up too Late. After this, his songs were included in several other London shows.

=== Contributor to musicals ===
Monckton soon became a regular composer (and sometimes lyricist) of songs for the very successful series of frothy musical comedies performed at London's Gaiety Theatre, under the management of George Edwardes, which premiered throughout the 1890s and into the first decade of the 20th century. Among others, he wrote half of the music for Arthur Roberts's burlesque Claude Du-Val (1894) and supplemented Ivan Caryll's score for the hit musical The Shop Girl in the same year, with such successful pieces as George Grossmith, Jr.'s "Beautiful Bountiful Bertie" and "Brown of Colorado" (with Adrian Ross). He then added popular tunes to Caryll's scores for The Circus Girl in 1896 ("A Simple Little String" and "The Way to Treat a Lady") and A Runaway Girl in 1898 ("Soldiers in the Park", "Society", "The Sly Cigarette", "The Boy Guessed Right" and "Not the Sort of Girl I Care About").

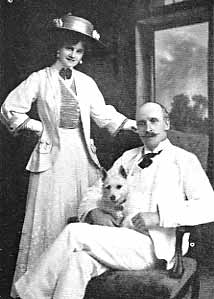
Monckton and wife Millar

The "Girl" musicals were followed by a number of "Boy" musicals, again with hit songs by Monckton, including The Messenger Boy in 1900 ("Maisie", "In the Wash", and "When the Boys Come Home Once More") and The Toreador in 1901 ("Captivating Cora", "I'm Romantic", "When I Marry Amelia", "Keep Off the Grass", and "Archie"). Monckton's songs continued to be performed long after the shows closed – some of them remaining popular into the 1960s. In 1902, he married Gertie Millar, one of the most successful actresses of the period, whom he had discovered and brought to Edwardes. She starred in many of Monckton's shows, and he wrote some of his most popular songs for her, although their marriage was not a happy one for many years. She later sought a divorce from Monckton, which he refused.

At the same time, Monckton also contributed songs for the musicals playing at Edwardes's Daly's Theatre, which tended more towards romantic comedies, than the light musicals presented at the Gaiety. For Daly's Theatre, he usually collaborated with Sidney Jones, supplying numbers for hits such as The Geisha in 1896 ("Jack's the Boy" and "The Toy Monkey"); A Greek Slave in 1898 ("I Want to Be Popular", "I Should Rather Like to Try", and "What Will Be the End of It?"); and San Toy in 1899 ("Rhoda and Her Pagoda", and "Sons of the Motherland"). Monckton's music was generally arranged and orchestrated by theatre conductor Carl Kiefert.

=== Peak years ===
Dare in The Arcadians

Finally, in 1902, when Jones left Daly's, Edwardes gave Monckton the opportunity to compose his first complete score, A Country Girl, with a few numbers by Paul Rubens (Monckton's key songs were "Molly the Marchioness", "Try Again, Johnny", and "Under the Deodar"). He also continued to contribute successful songs to other musicals, including The Orchid in 1903 at the Gaiety ("Liza Ann", "Little Mary", "Pushful", and "Fancy Dress"). The success of A Country Girl led to another musical with Monckton as principal composer and Rubens as contributor, The Cingalee in 1904. Monckton's most successful songs in this score included "The Island of Gay Ceylon" and "Pearl of Sweet Ceylon". Although the piece was successful, French operettas then became the fashion at Daly's Theatre, and Monckton went back to composing music for others' shows.

Further collaborations with Caryll at the Gaiety included The Spring Chicken in 1905 ("I Don't Know, But I Guess", "Alice Sat By the Fire", and "Under and Over Forty"), The New Aladdin, in 1906 and The Girls of Gottenberg in 1907 ("Two Little Sausages", "Rheingold", and "Berlin on the Spree"). These songs were among the most widely played and sung numbers of the contemporary light musical theatre. A last success at the Gaiety was Monckton and Caryll's Our Miss Gibbs in 1909 ("Moonstruck", "Mary", "In Yorkshire", "Soldiers in the Park", "Maisie", "Keep off the Grass" and "Our Farm"), which became an international hit.

After that, Monckton had his greatest success, in collaboration with Howard Talbot and the lyricist Arthur Wimperis, with The Arcadians, in 1909. The Arcadians, produced by Robert Courtneidge, was possibly Monckton's best score and is considered the classic musical of the Edwardian period. Like The Geisha, A Country Girl and Our Miss Gibbs, it became popular in America and elsewhere and included songs such as "The Pipes of Pan", "The Girl with the Brogue", and "All Down Piccadilly", which "held their own with the melodies of the now fashionable Viennese operetta as the song hits of the period."

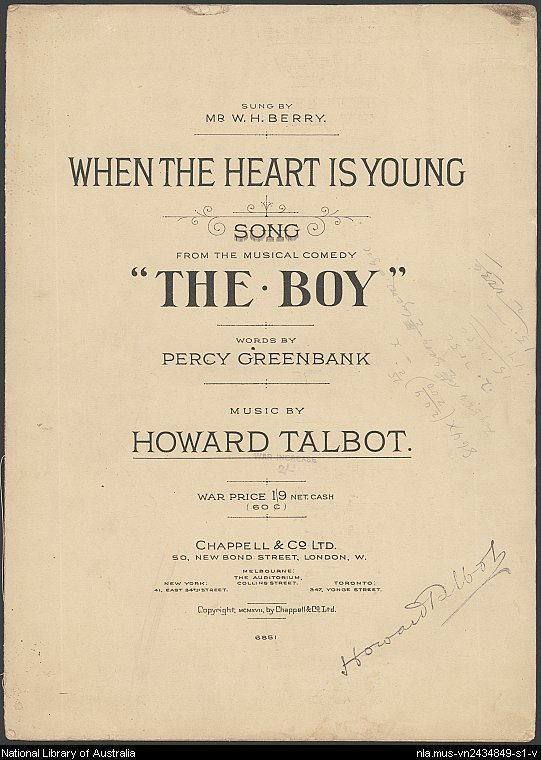
Music from The Boy

Edwardes purchased the lease of the Adelphi Theatre and began his productions there with another Monckton and Millar hit, The Quaker Girl, in 1910 ("The Quaker Girl", "Come to the Ball", and "Tony from America"). For Courtneidge, he wrote The Mousmé in 1911 ("I Know Nothing of Life", "The Little Japanese Mamma", "The Temple Bell", and "The Corner of My Eye") and for Edwardes and the Adelphi, he wrote The Dancing Mistress in 1912. The latter two pieces had merely respectable runs. Monckton's last big hit was The Boy in 1917 (produced after Edwardes's death), in collaboration with Howard Talbot. This was a musical comedy version of Arthur Wing Pinero's 1885 play, The Magistrate, and served as a vehicle for the comedian W. H. Berry, who had been the star of High Jinks. Monckton's successful songs included "I Want to Go to Bye-Bye", "The Game That Ends with a Kiss", and "Powder on Your Nose".

=== After World War I ===
Monckton was discouraged by Edwardes's death and unwilling to adapt his style of writing to the newly popular syncopated American dance rhythms, ragtime, and other "noisy numbers" that were heard in theatres. Although he contributed to some revues, including Bric à Brac (1915, including another song for Millar: "Chalk Farm to Camberwell Green"), We're All in it, and Airs and Graces, he had little enthusiasm for this, or for other new forms of musical entertainment, and he soon retired from composing. Monckton's music remained popular in Britain until after World War II, when American musicals took over the stage and even into the later half of the 20th century, in the case of his most popular shows.

Monckton died in his London home at the age of 62; he is buried in Brompton Cemetery. His estate was valued at £79,518. Later the same year his widow married William Humble Ward, 2nd Earl of Dudley.

== Principal shows and original runs ==
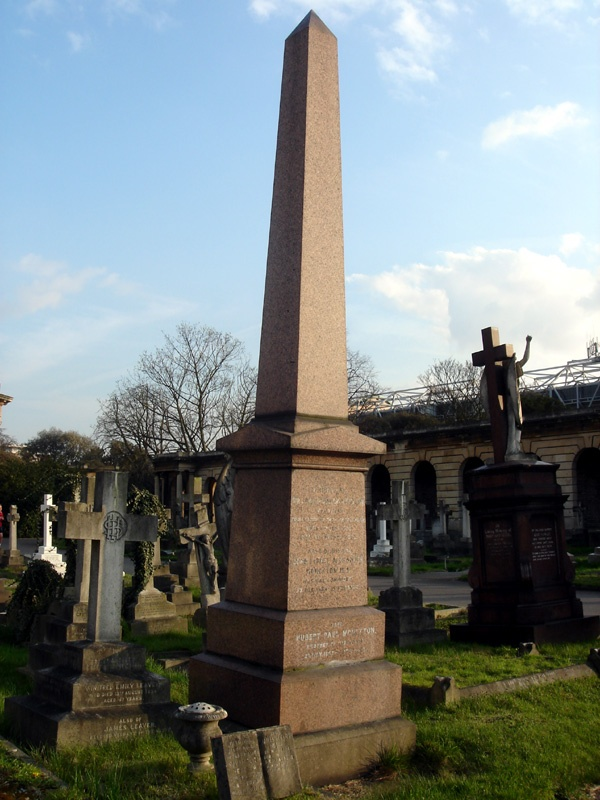
Funerary monument at Brompton Cemetery, London

- A Country Girl (1902) – 729 performances
- The Cingalee (1904) – 391 performances
- The Spring Chicken (1905) – 401 performances
- The Girls of Gottenberg (1907) – 303 performances
- Our Miss Gibbs (1909) – 636 performances
- The Arcadians (1909) – 809 performances.
- The Quaker Girl (1910) – 536 performances
- The Boy (1917) – 801 performances

This list includes only the shows where Monckton was the principal composer. Many of the shows to which he contributed songs also had very long runs.

== Recordings ==
The Arcadians has been recorded in excerpt form on LP and complete on CD by Ohio Light Opera. Recordings by Gwen Catley and Marilyn Hill Smith of numbers from Our Miss Gibbs and The Quaker Girl have been issued on CD. The first CD recording dedicated to selections of Monckton's works (also including music by Howard Talbot and Paul Rubens) was released by Divine Art in 2003: The Monckton Album by Theatre Bel-Etage, conductor Mart Sander. Selections from The Arcadians, The Quaker Girl and The Cingalee are featured on this album.

In 2008, Hyperion released an audio CD recording of songs from many of Monckton's shows entitled Lionel Monckton (1861–1924): Songs from the Shows. It features performers Richard Suart and Catherine Bott accompanied by the New London Orchestra and the New London Light Opera Chorus, conducted by Ronald Corp. The CD includes numbers from The Arcadians, A Country Girl, A Runaway Girl, The Toreador, The Messenger Boy, The Orchid, The Circus Girl, The Shop Girl, The Mousmé, The Quaker Girl, The Girls of Gottenberg, and Our Miss Gibbs. Many of the selections feature lyrics penned by Monckton himself under the pseudonym Leslie Mayne.

== Notes ==
Caricature of Monckton
