= The Quaker Girl =

Musical by James T. Tanner, Adrian Ross and Percy Greenbank

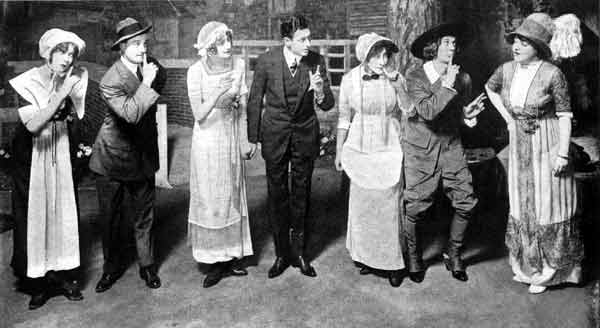
Scene from The Quaker Girl

The Quaker Girl is an Edwardian musical comedy in three acts with a book by James T. Tanner, lyrics by Adrian Ross and Percy Greenbank, and music by Lionel Monckton. In its story, The Quaker Girl contrasts dour Quaker morality with Parisienne high fashion. The protagonist, Prudence, is thrown out of her house by her Quaker parents for drinking a glass of champagne. Later, in Paris, her simple grey dress and bonnet become the height of fashion.

The musical opened at the Adelphi Theatre in London on 5 November 1910 and ran for an extremely successful 536 performances. It starred Gertie Millar and C. Hayden Coffin. Phyllis Dare starred in the Paris production in 1911. It then opened at the Park Theatre on Broadway on 23 October 1911, running for a successful 240 performances. A revised version was produced at the London Coliseum on 25 May 1944, but the run was interrupted by bombing. The piece then toured the British provinces and soon re-opened in London at the Stoll Theatre in February 1945, followed by extensive touring until December 1948. The piece was popular with amateur theatre groups, particularly in Britain, from the 1920s until 1990, receiving over 250 UK productions during that period, but it has been produced only sporadically since then.

Of the musical numbers in the score, only "Come to the Ball" continues to be well known, but "Tony from America" and "When a Bad Bad Boy" are also key numbers. Selections from the score were recorded in 2004 by Theatre Bel-Etage chorus and orchestra, with conductor Mart Sander. The complete show, including dialog, was revived in a staged concert with piano in July 2007 by the Lyric Theatre of San Jose, California.

== Roles ==
Millar (Prudence) and Coyne (Tony)

- Prudence Pym, A Quaker Girl – Gertie Millar
- Tony Chute, Naval Attache to U.S. Embassy, Paris – Joseph Coyne
- Princess Mathilde, An exiled Bonapartist Princess – Elsie Spain
- Captain Charteris, Kings Messenger, Princess Mathilde's Fiancé – Hayden Coffin
- Phoebe, Maid to Princess Mathilde – Gracie Leigh
- Madame Blum, of Maison Blum, Paris – Mlle. Caumont
- Prince Carlo, Once engaged to Princess Mathilde – G. Carvey
- Monsieur Duhamel, Minister of State – Herbert Ross
- Monsieur Larose, Chief of Police, Paris – D. J. Williams
- Mrs. Lukyn, Proprietress of "The Chequers" – Luna Love
- Toinette, Shop Girl at Maison Blum, Paris – Gina Palerme
- Diane, A Parisian Actress – Phyllis Le Grand
- Nathaniel Pym, A Quaker – Henry Kills
- Rachel Pym, A Quaker – Jennie Richards
- Jeremiah, The Quaker's Manservant – James Blakely
- Jarge, Town Crier – George Bellamy

== Synopsis ==
Act I

Nathaniel and Rachel Pym are the grim and proper rulers of an early 19th-century Quaker community in an English village. A mysterious young French lady and her not-too-bright maid Phoebe arrive to stay at Mrs. Lukyn's hotel. The lady turns out to be the exiled Princess Mathilde of France ("O, Time, Time"). She is followed by Captain Charteris, whom she intends to marry in the village church despite her previous engagement to Prince Carlo. Charteris has his best man with him, Tony Chute, of the American Embassy in Paris, as well as Madame Blum, a famous Parisian dressmaker.

Prudence Pym, the niece of Nathaniel and Rachel, longs for a more exciting life and someone to love ("A Quaker Girl"). She meets Tony, and they are attracted to one another. Madame Blum, struck by Prudence's charmingly simple grey Quaker dress, tries to persuade her to accompany her back to Paris ("Tip Toe"). The marriage ceremony between the princess and Charteris takes place, and Prudence, carried away by the gaiety of the scene, is induced to take a sip of champagne. At this moment, with the wine to her lips, her aunt and uncle and the other Quakers appear on the scene. They sternly command her to leave these sinful people. Prudence decides to leave the dull life behind and to follow Madame Blum and the princess to Paris. She is disowned by her family.

Act II

Employed as a mannequin in Madame Blum's establishment in Paris, Prudence's simple costume becomes all the rage among the women, and she herself becomes extremely popular with the young men, including Prince Carlo (who had been engaged to Princess Mathilde) and Monsieur Duhamel, a distinguished government minister. This attention is most unwelcome to Tony Chute, who still has feelings for Prudence. The princess is disguised as one of Madame Blum's work girls, since she has been exiled for being a Bonapartiste. Tony's ex-girlfriend, Diane, a mercurial French actress, conspires to interfere with Tony and Prudence's budding romance. She has love letters from Duhamel, Carlo and Tony and intends to give Prudence the letters from Tony. At a costume fitting where Prudence is modeling a dress, Diane slips the letters into Prudence's pocket. But she inadvertently passes along Duhamel's letters, instead of Tony's.

Prince Carlo invites Prudence and all of Blum's employees to a Ball ("Come to the Ball"), but Tony, knowing the Prince's reputation as a seducer, begs Prudence not to go. Prudence promises, and she receives her first kiss. Princess Mathilde is being pursued by the Monsieur Larose, the dogged Chief of Police, and the Prince has recognized Princess Mathilde. He threatens to reveal her identity to Larose unless Prudence accompanies him to the ball. For the sake of Mathilde, Prudence reluctantly agrees, breaking her promise to Tony. Tony is furious, believing her to be unfaithful.

Act III

At the lavish ball, Prudence, evading the prince, finds herself alone with her other suitor, Duhamel. She confronts him with his love letters showing that he has not been faithful to her. Duhamel assumes she is trying to blackmail him into letting Mathide stay in France, but Prudence tells him that she merely wants to return the letters to their rightful owner. Ashamed of his suspicion, and humbled by her simple honesty, Duhamel agrees to allow Mathilde to remain in Paris. Tony now learns the true story, and he begs forgiveness for having doubted her. All ends happily, with Prudence accompanying him back to the New World.

== Musical numbers ==
Music by Lionel Monckton and lyrics by Adrian Ross and Percy Greenbank, except as noted.

Act I

- "We've Such a Tale to Tell" – Chorus and Mrs. Lukyn
- "While Our Worthy Village Neighbours" – Chorus of Quakers
- "Wonderful (O, Time, Time)" – Princess Mathilde and Captain Charteris
- "A Runaway Match" – Princess Mathilde, Phoebe, Charteris and Tony Chute
- "A Quaker Girl" – Prudence
- "A Bad Boy and a Good Girl" – Prudence and Tony
- "Tip-Toe" – Princess Mathilde, Prudence, Madame Blum, Phoebe, Charteris, Tony and Chorus
- "Just As Father Used to Do" – Jeremiah and Chorus of Girls
- Finale Act I ("It's the Wedding Day") – Princess Mathilde, Prudence and company

Act II

- "In this Abode (Fashion So Soon Dethrones)" – Toinette and Chorus
- "Or Thereabouts!" – Phoebe (music by Hugo Felix)
- "On Revient de Chantilly" – Chorus and Quartet
- "Ah Oui" and "The Little Grey Bonnet" – Prudence
- "Come to the Ball" – Prince Carlo and Chorus
- "A Dancing Lesson" – Prudence and Tony
- "Barbizon" – Princess Mathilde, Phoebe, Blum, Charteris and Jeremiah
- Finale Act II – Tony and Company (some music and lyrics by Clifton Crawford)

Act III

- Introduction and Dance
- "When We Are Rich" – Phoebe and Jeremiah
- "A Wilderness and Thou" – Princess Mathilde and Charteris
- "Tony, From America" – Prudence
- "Something to Tell" – Tony (music and lyrics by Crawford)
- "The First Dance" – Prudence and Tony
- Finale Act III – Company

Monckton's "Petticoats For Women" was replaced by "Or Thereabouts!", which is a later interpolation, as was "Something to Tell".
