= Gertie Millar =

British actor and singer (1879–1952)

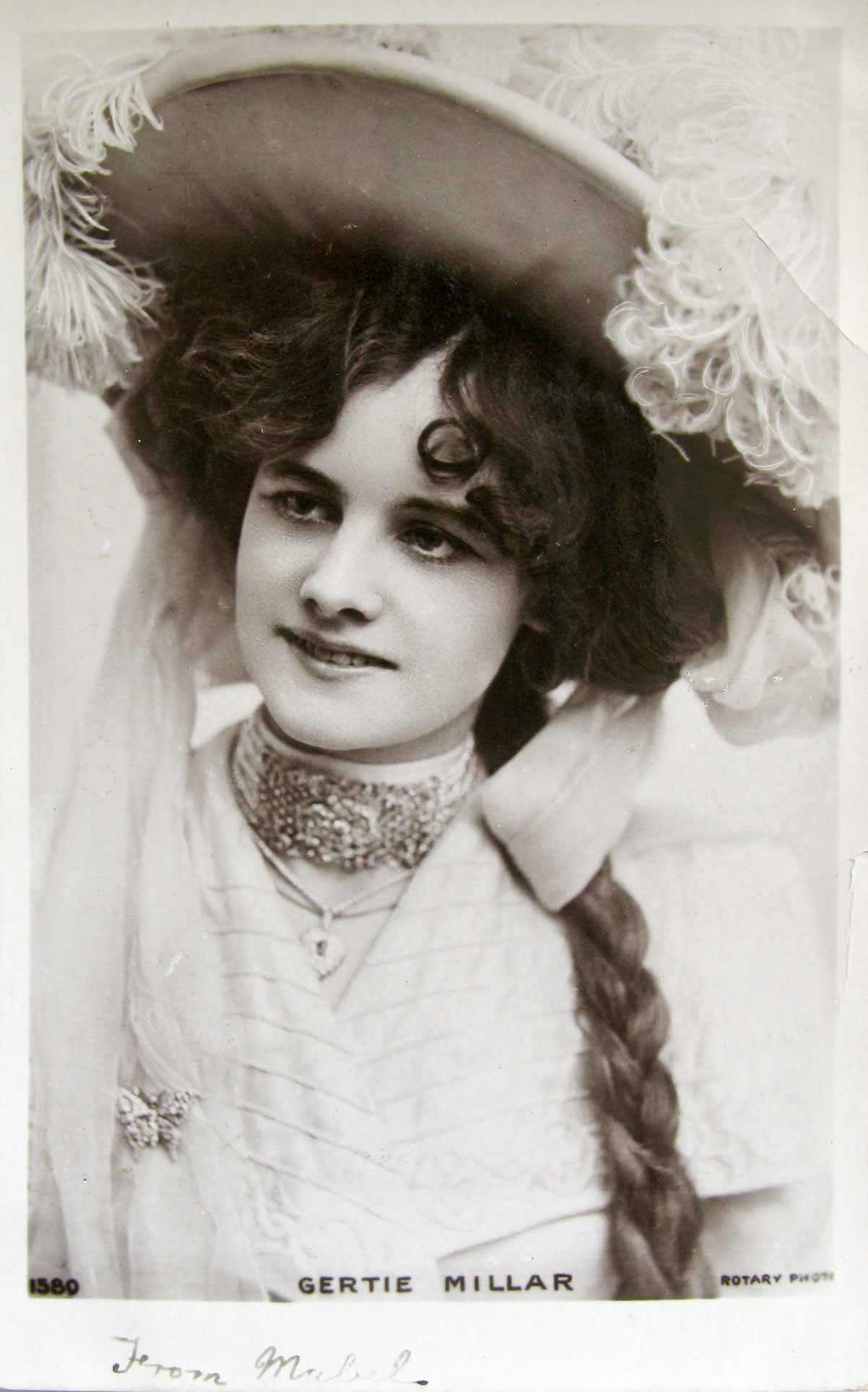
- Gertie Millar, c. 1906
- Born: Gertrude Millar; 21 February 1879; Manningham, Bradford, England
- Died: 25 April 1952 (aged 73); Chiddingfold, England
- Occupations: Actress, singer
- Spouses: Lionel Monckton (m. 1902; died 1924) William Ward, 2nd Earl of Dudley (m. 1924; died 1932)

Gertrude Ward, Countess of Dudley (née Millar; 21 February 1879 – 25 April 1952), known as Gertie Millar, was an English actress and singer of the early 20th century, known for her performances in Edwardian musical comedies.

Beginning her career at age 13, Millar was a prominent star of musical comedies for two decades. In 1902, she married the composer Lionel Monckton, who wrote the scores of many of her shows and songs that she made famous. She was one of the most prominent West End theatre performers of the early 20th century, starring in such long-running hits as The Toreador (1901), The Orchid (1903) The Spring Chicken (1905), The New Aladdin (1906) The Girls of Gottenberg (1907), Our Miss Gibbs (1909), The Quaker Girl (1910), Gipsy Love (1912), The Dancing Mistress (1912), The Marriage Market (1913), and A Country Girl (1914).

After Monckton died in 1924, Millar married the 2nd Earl of Dudley.

== Life and career ==
Millar was born in Manningham, Bradford, where her father, John Millar, was a mill worker, and her mother, Elizabeth (née Miller), was a worsted-stuff worker and dressmaker.

=== Early career ===
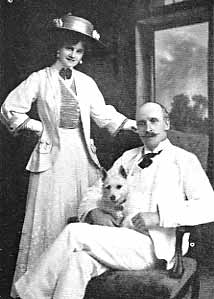
Millar and husband Lionel Monckton

As a child, Millar performed in London pantomimes, beginning with Babes in the Wood at the St. James Theatre in Manchester, at the age of 13. She started out as a singer and dancer in the music halls of Yorkshire. Later, she moved to London where she was soon earning good notices and better pay appearing in variety show bills. By 1897, she was playing the role of Phyllis Crosby in A Game of Cards at Shodfriars Hall, Boston, Lincolnshire. Next she toured in The New Barmaid in the role of Dora; in The Silver Lining; and as Sadie Pinkhose, the "other woman", in The Lady Detective. In 1899, she played Dandini in a version of Cinderella at the Grand Theatre, Fulham.

In the new century, she starred in a series of hit musical comedies produced by George Edwardes. In 1900, she played Isabel Blythe in the touring production of The Messenger Boy. Edwardes's next show was The Toreador in 1901 at the Gaiety Theatre in London. Lionel Monckton, one of the show's composers, had seen Millar in The Messenger Boy and requested that she be given the role of the bridesmaid Cora in the new musical, singing "Keep Off the Grass". She made the song popular and earned a second song, "Captivating Cora", and a third, "I'm not a simple little girl". These hits established Millar in London. The Gaiety Theatre closed for renovations in 1902, and the last show at the old theatre was The Linkman; or, Gaiety Memories, with Millar starring as Morgiana. She married Monckton on 25 December 1902 in St. Mark's Church, Surbiton, England. Monckton continued to write hit songs for her in subsequent shows.

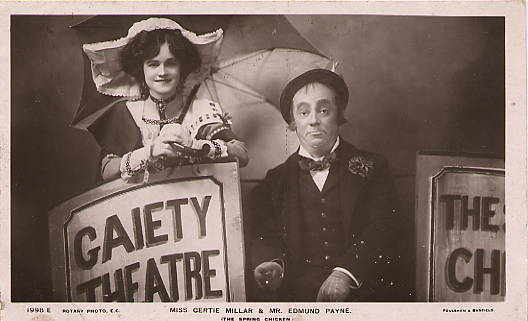
Millar and Edmund Payne in The Spring Chicken

Millar became one of the most photographed women of the Edwardian period. She had top billing as the Hon. Violet Anstruther in The Orchid, the show that opened the new Gaiety (1903; introducing the songs "Little Mary", "Liza Ann", and "Come with me to the zoo"). She starred as Rosalie in The Spring Chicken (1905; singing "Alice sit by the fire" and "The Delights of London") and as Lally in The New Aladdin (1906). She next starred as Mitzi in The Girls of Gottenberg (1907; singing the duet "Two Little Sausages", with Edmund Payne, and the Wagnerian parody "Rhinegold"). Soon afterwards, Edwardes cast her as Franzi at the Hicks Theatre in the English-language production of Ein Walzertraum (A Waltz Dream, 1908) by Oscar Straus. Although Millar was able to sell the light musical comedy songs composed for her at the Gaiety, Oscar Straus's music was too demanding for her small voice, and she was sent to New York to star in the Broadway production of The Girls of Gottenberg.

On the morning of 30 October 1905 at Millar's and Monckton's residence in Russell Square, London, Baron Gunther Rau von Holzhauzen, an infatuated young admirer of Millar's, shot himself with a revolver in Millar's boudoir. A maid discovered him hiding there, and she ran upstairs screaming to wake the Moncktons as the gun was fired. Von Holzhauzen died hours later at a nearby hospital. He visited and lunched with Millar occasionally over a period of many months and had written letters to her professing to love her and later expressing despondency over his finances.

=== Later years ===
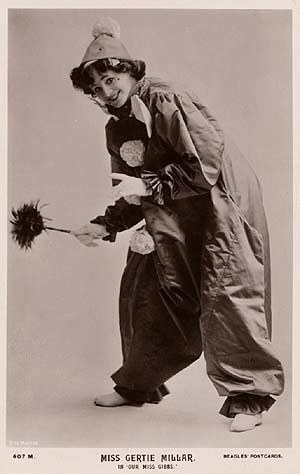
As Pierrot in Our Miss Gibbs

After she returned to London, from New York, some of Millar's biggest successes were still in front of her. They included the title role of the hit Gaiety musical, Our Miss Gibbs (1909), with Millar introducing the songs "Moonstruck", "Yorkshire", and "Our farm", all written for her by Monckton. Monckton and Millar then moved to Edwardes' newest theatre, the Adelphi, where she played the title role, Prudence Pym, in another international hit, The Quaker Girl (1910). In this, she popularised the songs "The Quaker Girl", "The Little Grey Bonnet", and "Tony from America". After this, she returned to continental operetta, playing Lady Babby in Edwardes's English language version of Franz Lehár's Gipsy Love (1912) at Daly's Theatre. In this role, the musical demands were light, and the show was a success. She returned to the Adelphi to play Nancy Joyce in The Dancing Mistress (1912), and back at Daly's she played Kitty Kent in The Marriage Market (1913). This was followed by the role of Nan in a major revival of A Country Girl (1914). She also played Sallie Denbigh in The House of Bondage, a 1914 film.

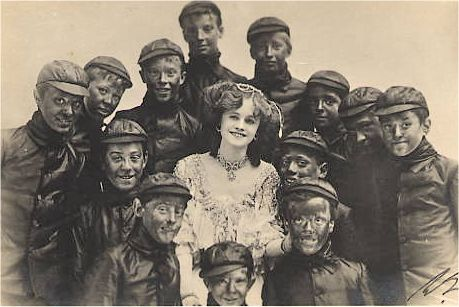
Millar and boys in The Orchid

World War I brought a change in the tastes of the theatregoing public. Edwardes died in 1915, and Millar's husband was in poor health. After appearing in two Monckton revues (Bric à Brac (1915; she sang "Neville was a Devil") and Airs and Graces (1917)), two unsuccessful musical comedies (Houp La! (1916) and Flora (1918)) and some productions in the provinces, Millar left the stage in 1918. Monckton died on 15 February 1924. Two months later, on 30 April 1924, Millar married the 2nd Earl of Dudley. Before the war, he had been the Governor-General of Australia. Lord Dudley died in 1932.

Millar (now Lady Dudley), survived her second husband by two decades and died at her home in Chiddingfold in 1952, aged 73. She left an estate valued at £52,354.

== Gallery ==
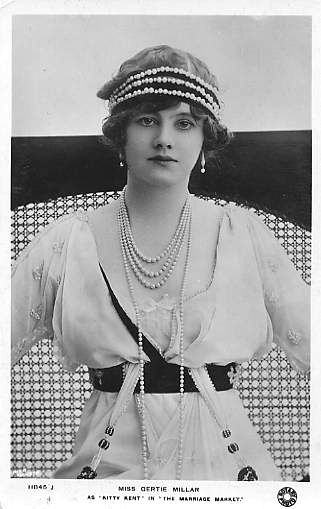
Millar in The Marriage Market

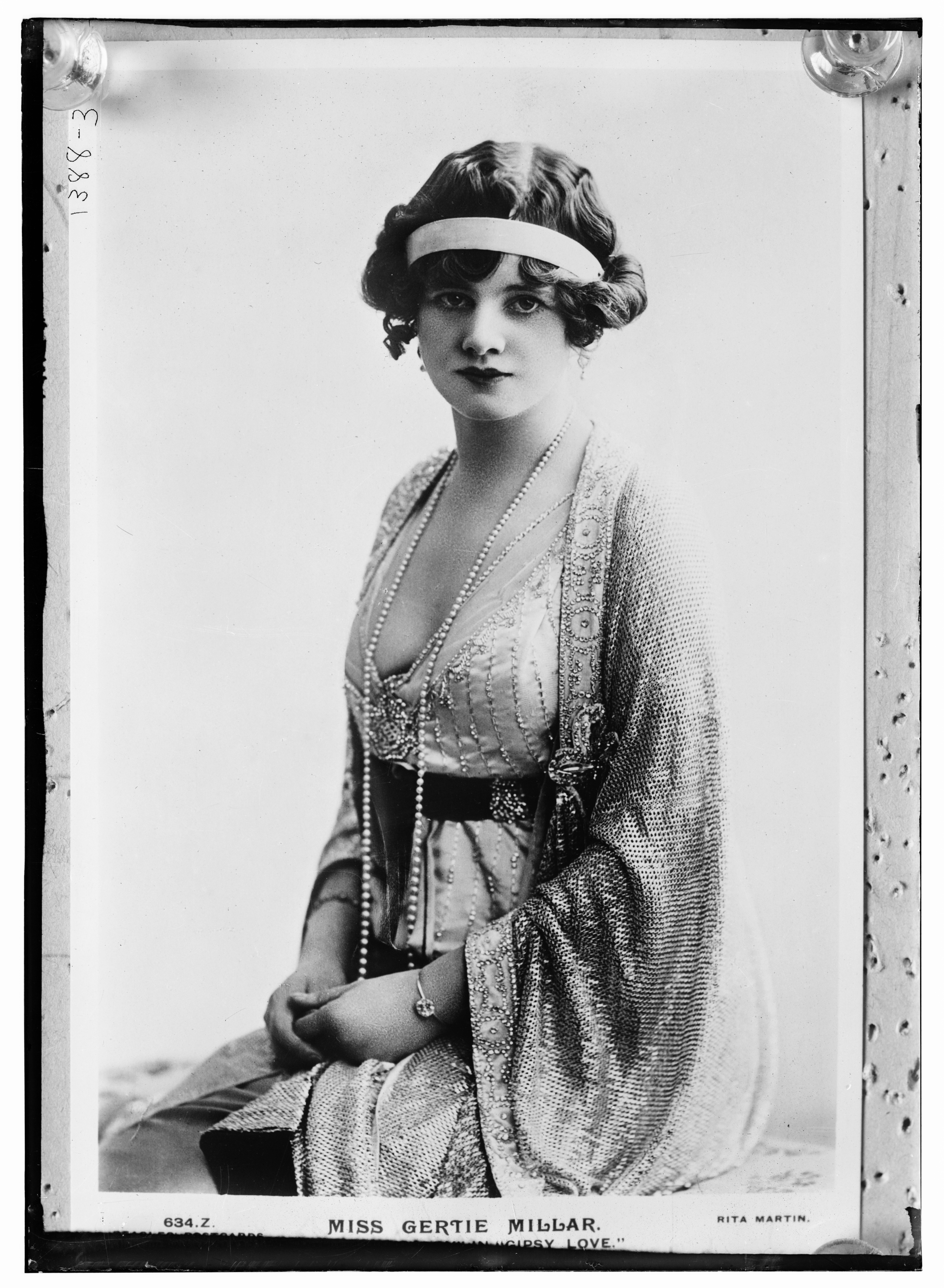
Millar in 1900

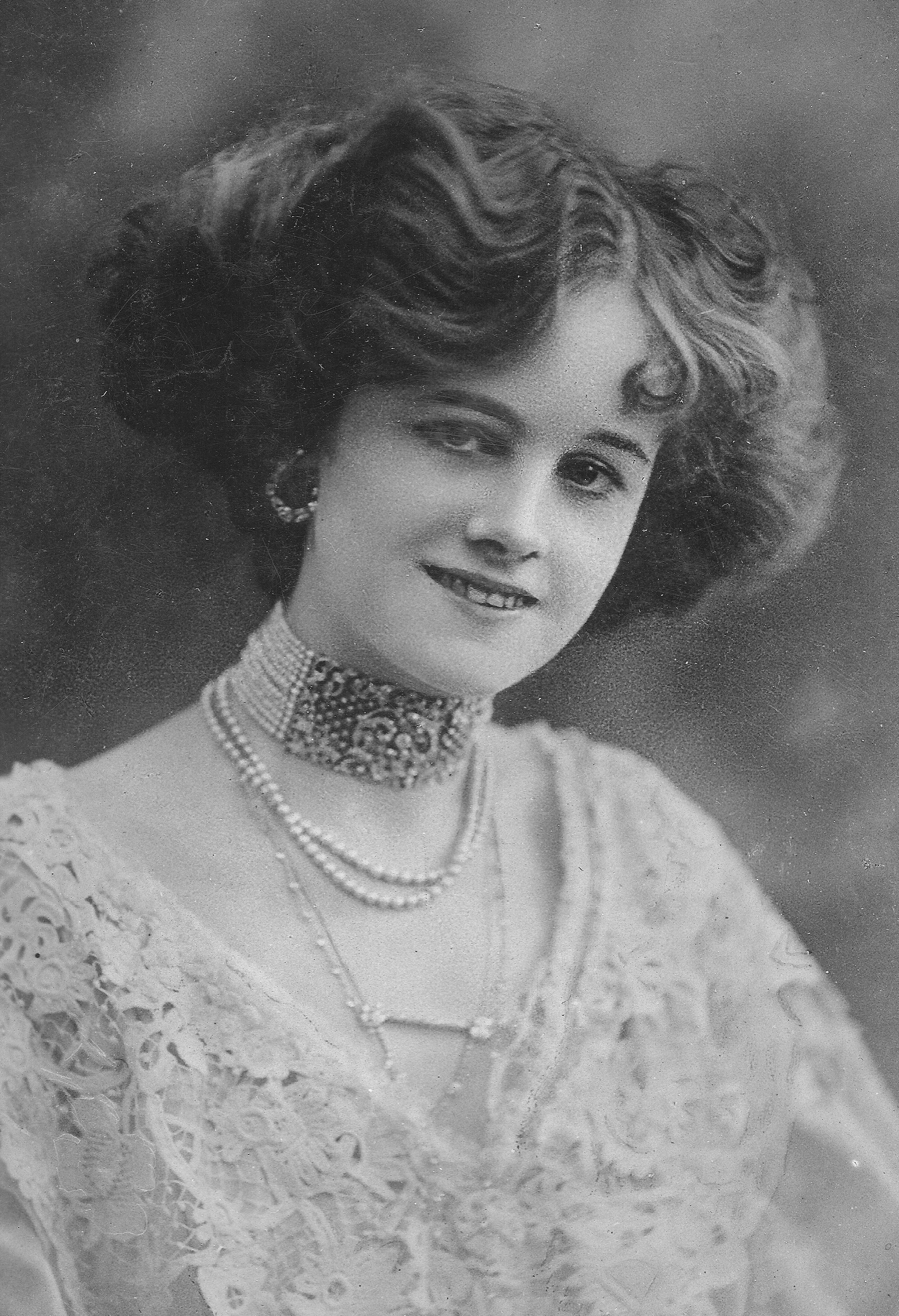
Gertie Millar

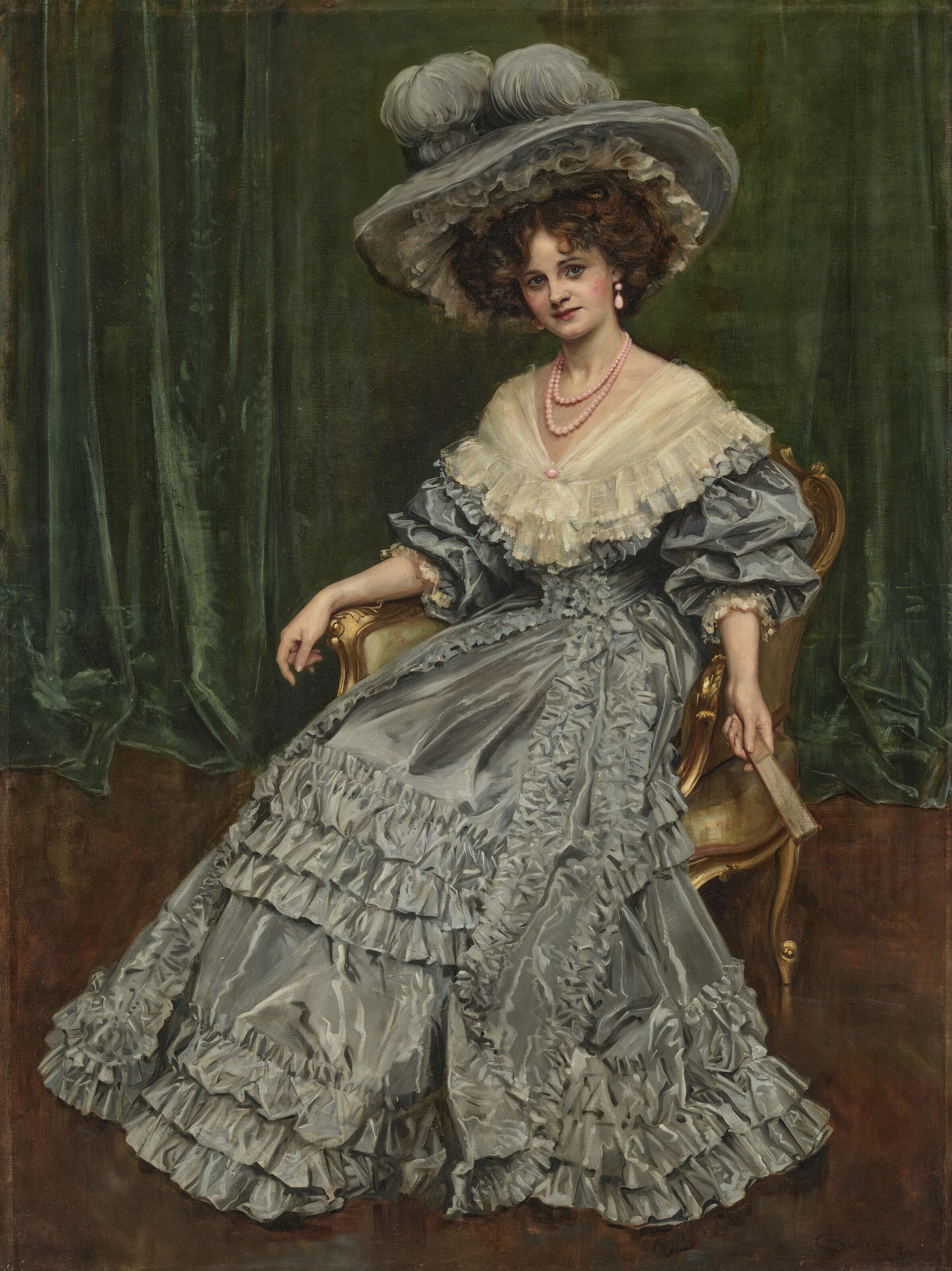
Portrait of Gertie Millar, 1905, by Albert Henry Collings
