= Willie Warde =

English actor-dancer

Warde in 1911

Willie Warde (1857 – 18 August 1943) was an English actor, dancer, singer and choreographer. The son of a dancer, his first theatre work was with a dance company. He was engaged to arrange dances for London productions and was later cast as a comic actor in musical theatre. He was associated for over two decades with the Gaiety and Daly's theatres under the management of George Edwardes, playing in and choreographing burlesques and, later, Edwardian musical comedies. In later years he played character roles in West End comic plays.

== Biography ==
=== Early years ===
Warde was born in Great Yarmouth, Norfolk, in the east of England, the second son and third child of William Warde (died 1859), a professional dancer, actor and author and director of the Winchester music hall in south London. Warde's older siblings were John and Emma, both of whom were also dancers. Warde followed his father's profession, and joined a dance troupe led by his brother-in-law John D'Auban (who choreographed many W. S. Gilbert works and had married Warde's sister Emma in 1871), with whom he appeared in 1878.

In 1886, Warde was choreographer for Ivan Caryll's The Lily of Leoville at the Comedy Theatre. By 1888, Warde was appearing as an actor. Charles Hawtrey cast him in a burlesque of Atalanta at the Strand Theatre with Frank Wyatt and Tom Squire. For the next twenty years, Warde maintained a dual career as choreographer and actor, as the Victorian musical theatre evolved from burlesque into Edwardian musical comedy. Away from the West End, he also occasionally undertook the stage direction of musical shows in the provinces.

=== Acting career ===
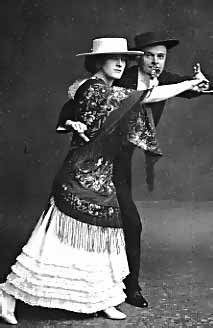
George Grossmith, Jr. and Phyllis Dare executing Warde's choreography in The Sunshine Girl

For the Christmas season of 1889, Warde appeared at the Avenue Theatre in The Field of the Cloth of Gold. In 1891, he played the Bishop of Bovril in a burlesque entitled Joan of Arc, or the Merry Maid of Orleans (by Adrian Ross and J. L. Shine), under the management of George Edwardes.

Warde participated in many of Edwardes's hit musical productions for more than twenty years thereafter, both as actor and choreographer. At the Gaiety Theatre, London, he appeared in Edwardes's productions of The Shop Girl (1894), A Runaway Girl (1898), The Messenger Boy (1900) and The Toreador (1901). When Edwardes moved to Daly's Theatre, Warde appeared in A Country Girl (1902), The Little Michus (1905), The Dollar Princess (1909), A Waltz Dream (1910), and The Count of Luxembourg (1911). Of Warde's performance in A Waltz Dream, The Times wrote, "Mr Willie Warde's few, almost surreptitious, steps made Tantalus of us all. Mr Willie Warde without a dance is like a hired Christmas cake that is to be looked at, not eaten", Among other shows in which Warde appeared for different managements were J. M. Barrie's Pantaloon (1905), in which he created the role of Harlequin, and The Three Kisses (1907).

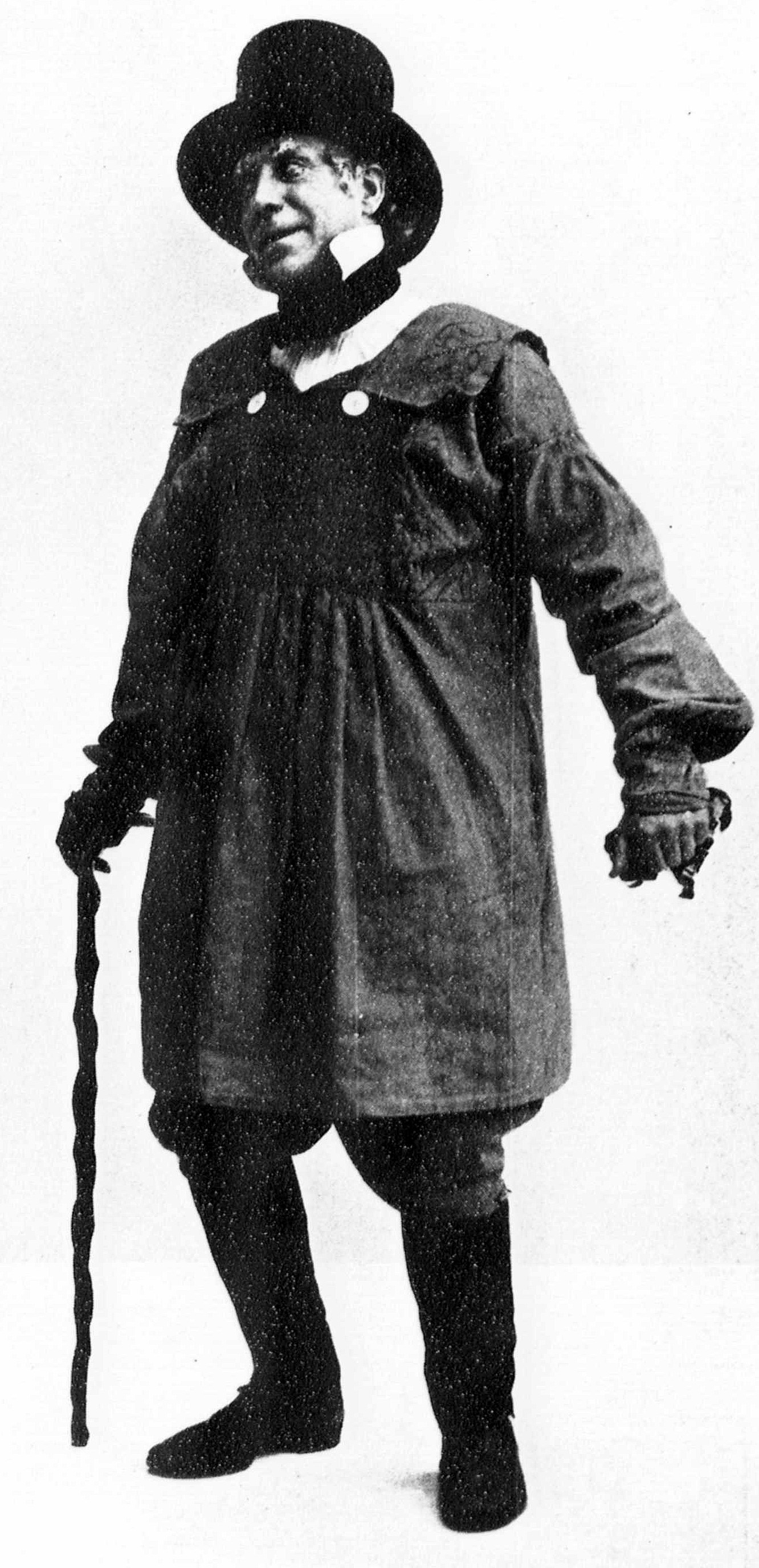
Warde as Mummery in A Country Girl, 1902

=== Choreography ===
The term "choreographer" was not generally used at the time of Warde's career. Theatre programmes usually read, "The dances arranged by ...". Shows for which Warde arranged the dances included the burlesques Little Jack Sheppard (1885), in which he also appeared, and Cinder Ellen up too Late (1891). In 1889, he arranged the dances for the D'Oyly Carte Opera Company for Gilbert and Sullivan's The Gondoliers. The musical comedies that he choreographed included A Gaiety Girl (1893); The Shop Girl (1894); The Geisha (1896); A Greek Slave (1898); A Gaiety Girl (revival, 1899); The Lucky Star at the Savoy Theatre (1899); San Toy (1900); Three Little Maids (1902); The Duchess of Dantzic (1903); and The Cingalee (1904), in which he also appeared. He also arranged the dances for the hit English première of The Merry Widow (1907) and the Gaiety musical The Sunshine Girl (1912).

=== Later years ===
After World War I, Warde played character roles in comedy, appearing in Tons of Money in 1922. This was filmed in 1930, with Warde reprising his stage role of Giles. He later appeared with Seymour Hicks in Ferenc Molnár's The Guardsman in 1925. Hicks called Warde "One of the greatest artists I have ever met in my life. ... His pantomime was of the simplest but perfection." In retirement, he took part in a BBC radio history of George Edwardes and the Gaiety in 1938, along with Hicks and Ellaline Terriss.

Warde died in London at the age of 86.
