= The Duchess of Dantzic =

1903 comic opera by Ivan Caryll

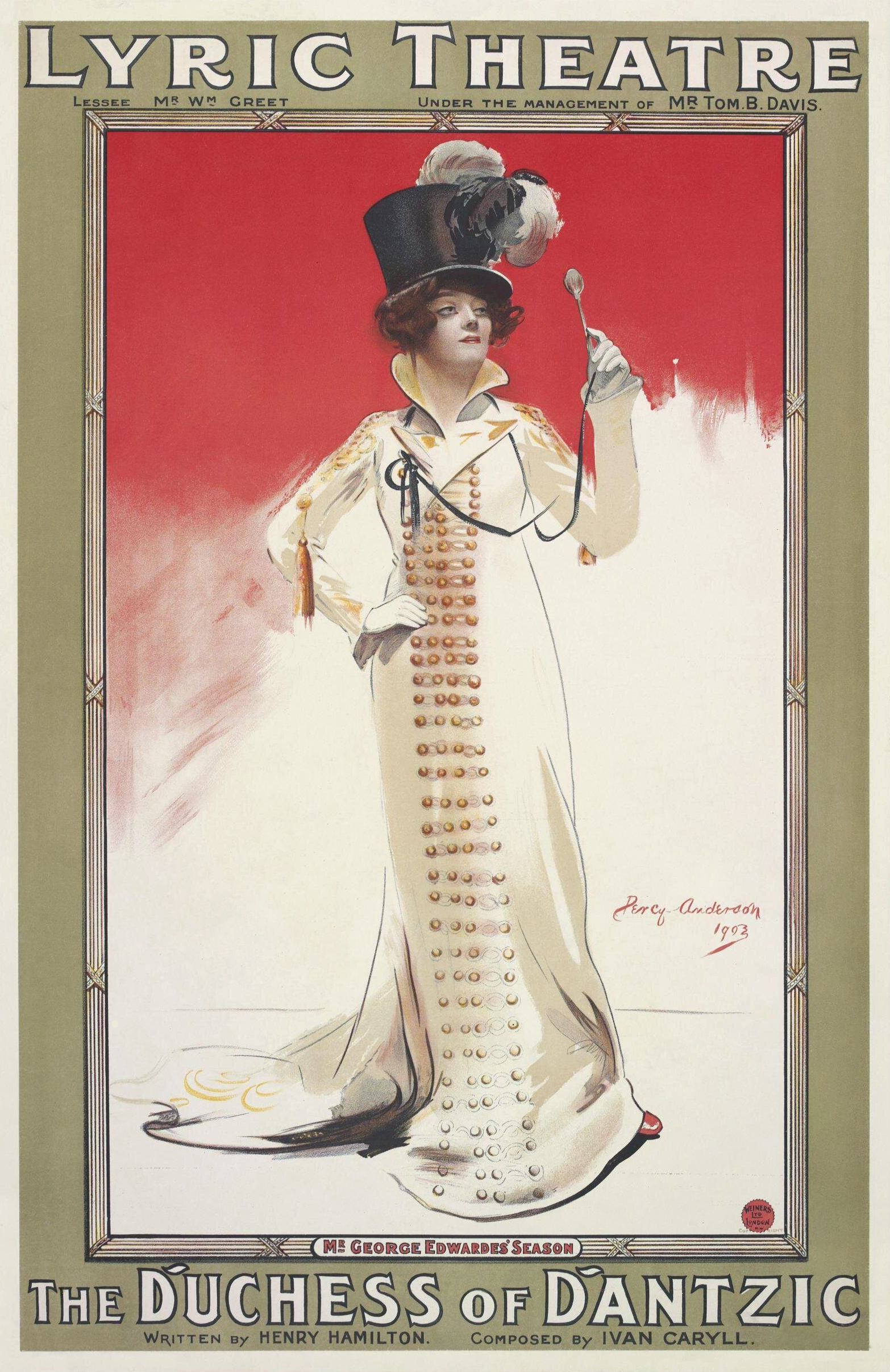
Poster for the original production by Percy Anderson.

The Duchess of Dаntzic is a comic opera in three acts, set in Paris, with music by Ivan Caryll and a book and lyrics by Henry Hamilton, based on the play Madame Sans-Gêne by Victorien Sardou and Émile Moreau. Additional lyrics are by Adrian Ross. The story concerns Napoleon I and a laundress, Catherine Üpscher, who marries Marshal Lefebvre and becomes a Duchess.

The opera was first produced in London at the Lyric Theatre in 1903 and ran for 236 performances. Subsequently, it enjoyed a successful New York production at Daly's Theatre and other productions around the world, and it was revived in London and performed regularly by amateur theatre groups, particularly in Britain, until the 1950s.

== Background ==
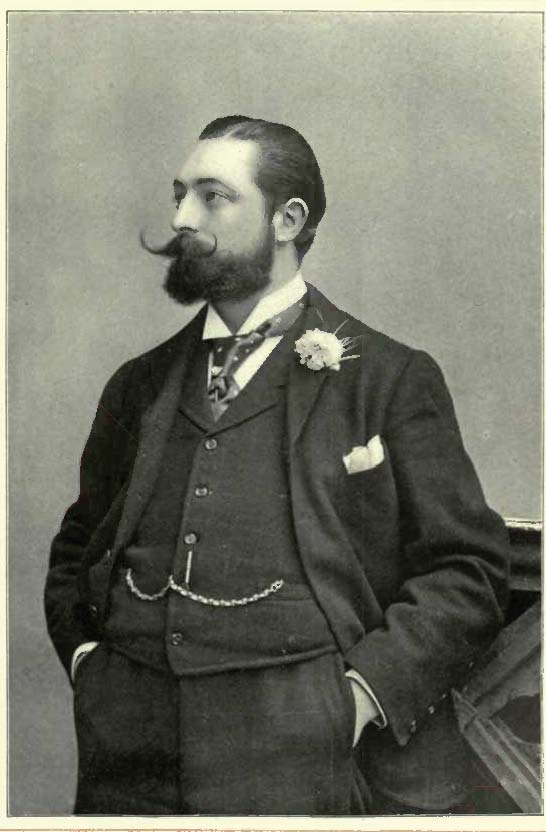
Ivan Caryll

After composing a few comic operas early in his career, Caryll became extraordinarily successful in the 1890s, writing the music to hit musical comedies produced by George Edwardes, including The Shop Girl (1894), The Gay Parisienne (1896), The Circus Girl (1896) and A Runaway Girl (1898). After the turn of the century, he continued to write some of the most successful musical comedy scores of the era, including The Messenger Boy (1900), The Toreador (1901), The Girl From Kays (1902), The Earl and the Girl (1903) and The Orchid (1903). With The Duchess of Dantzic, he turned back to comic opera. Although the piece met with success, it was not the kind of blockbuster hit that the above-mentioned musical comedies were.

The musical adaptation followed a celebrated production of an English version of the original French play, translated by J. Comyns Carr and starring Henry Irving and Ellen Terry. The original production of The Duchess of Dantzic, produced by Edwardes, opened at the Lyric Theatre in London on 17 October 1903 and ran for 236 performances. It was directed by Robert Courtneidge, choreographed by Willie Warde and had scenery by Joseph Harker and costumes by Percy Anderson. The score was generally admired, although called old-fashioned.

The original New York production at Daly's Theatre ran from 16 January 1905 to 15 April 1905 for a total of 93 performances. The production was directed by Holbrook Blinn and choreographed by Warde with the Anderson costumes. The cast consisted mostly of the London players, including Adrienne Augarde as Renée, Holbrook Blinn as Napoleon I, Evie Greene as Catherine, and Courtice Pounds as Papillon.

J.C. Williamson produced the piece in Australia in 1909. A 1932 London revival starring Frank Cellier ran from 26 April to 20 May.

== Roles and original cast ==
Courtice Pounds as Papillon

=== Act I (1792) ===
- Catherine Üpscher (Known as "La Sans-Gêne") – Evie Greene
- Lisette, Jeanne, Mathilde, Babette (Laundresses) – Claire Greet, Dorothy Tremblett, Mea Winfred and E. Labare
- Philippe, Vicomte de Bethune – Lawrence Rea
- Captain Regnier (National Guard) – Philip H. Bracy
- Napoleon Bonaparte (Lieutenant of Artillery) – Holbrook Blinn
- Sergeant François Lefebvre (of the National Guard) – Denis O'Sullivan
- Sergeant Flageot (of the National Guard) – A. J. Evelyn
- Papillon (A Pedlar) – Courtice Pounds

=== Acts II and III (1807) ===
- Caroline Murat (Grand Duchess of Berg and Cleves, Sister of Napoleon) – Kitty Gordon
- Pauline, Princess Borghese (Sister of Napoleon) – Violet Elliott
- Catherine Maréchale Lefebvre (Madame Sans-Gêne) – Evie Greene
- Renée de Saint Mézard (An Imperial Ward) – Adrienne Augarde
- Mme. De Beauffremont (of the Imperial Court) – Mabel Lorrell
- Mme. De Chatel (of the Imperial Court) – Mina Green
- Lisette (Maréchale Lefebvre's Maid) – Claire Greet
- Napoleon I (Emperor of the French) – Holbrook Blinn
- Comte de Narbonne (A Courtier) – Barry Neame
- M. D'alégre (Chamberlain to the Grand Duchess of Berg) – Philip H. Bracy
- Adhémar, Vicomte de Bethune – Lawrence Rea
- Papillon (Court Milliner) – Courtice Pounds

Billie Burke was a replacement player.

== Synopsis ==
=== Act I ===
At the height of the French revolution, Catherine, nicknamed Madame Sans-Gêne ("without embarrassment"), a laundress, pursues her job, unimpressed by the revolutionary comings and goings. Her fiancé, Lefebvre, is absent, taking part in the storming of the royal palace. She concentrates on her job, in the course of which she is visited by Lieutenant Napoleon Bonaparte. He is too short of money to pay his laundry bill, and touched by his description of the calls on his modest income in supporting his family she lets him off his debts and even offers him some money to help him. However, she holds on to his unpaid bill.

As soon as Bonaparte has left, a young aristocrat, Philippe de Béthune, dashes in, to seek sanctuary from a pursuing revolutionary mob. Catherine takes pity on him, and, aided by the sympathetic pedlar Papillon, she hides Béthune in her bedroom. Her fiancé, Lefebvre, searches the place on behalf of the mob and publicly declares that she is not concealing anyone. Left alone he accuses her of hiding a lover. Béthune emerges from hiding to defend Catherine's honour, and Lefebvre is won over. He and Catherine help Béthune make his escape, leaving his young son and heir under their protection. Lefebvre gains a commission in the army and is appointed a lieutenant. Catherine is appointed vivandière (supplier of goods and victuals) to the regiment.

=== Act II ===
Fifteen years elapse. Bonaparte is now Emperor of the French, and all his old colleagues have been rewarded with titles and places at court. Lefebvre is now a Marshal of France, but his free-minded wife, Catherine, despite her new title of Duchess of Dantzic, not to mention her adopted son Adhèmar (Béthune's son), does not fit in with court etiquette, and Napoleon indicates to Lefebvre that he should divorce her and marry Mademoiselle Renée, whom the emperor considers more suitable. As Adhèmar is in love with Renée, he rebels against the emperor's cruel command and is arrested.

=== Act III ===
Adhèmar is liable to execution for rebellion. His pardon is dependent on his adopted parents' obeying Napoleon's orders and divorcing. Catherine confronts the emperor with the unpaid laundry bill from the days of his youthful poverty, and, reminded of her unselfish kindness to him, he relents, allows Catherine and Lefebvre to stay together, and blesses the marriage of Adhèmar and Renée.

== Musical numbers ==
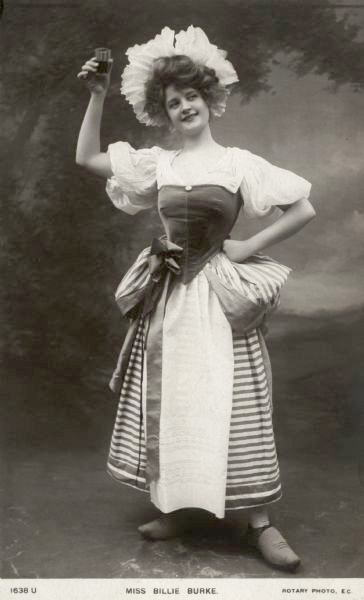
Billie Burke as a servant girl

=== Act I ===
- Here you may gaze upon a bevy of beauty – Lisette, Jacqueline, Mathilde and Laundresses
- When the trumpets sound "To arms" – Soldiers
- Wine of France! – Sergeant Francoise Lefebvre and All
- Catherine Upscher, licensed laundress – Catherine Üpscher
- Are you wanting silk or satin? – Papillon and Chorus
- Fricassée (dance)
- My Sabots – Catherine
- Do You Remember? – Francoise and Catherine
- Dear Francois – Catherine Upscher, Sergeant Francoise Lefebvre, Papillon and Phillipe
- Forgive me, pray – Phillipe (New York production only)
- Finale Act I
  - The tyrant is shaken – Soldiers, Mob, Laundresses and Chorus
  - Aha, my boy, I give you joy – Captain Reignier
  - Brothers in Arms – Catherine
  - Then haste to the wedding – All

=== Act II ===
- Old days have come again – Reignier, Pauline, Caroline Murat, Ladies and Courtiers
- When lurid terror ruled the land – Adhémar
- His Majesty orders that ladies at court – Ensemble
- You know the legend olden – Adhémar and Renée de Saint Mezard
- La Petit Caporal (Lyrics by Ross) – Renée and Chorus
- Here in big boxes we bear – Chorus
- I'm the Milliner Monarch of Paris – Papillon and Chorus
- First right, then left – Catherine and Papillon, with Chorus
- Vivat! Vivat! Imperator Salve – Entrance of Napoleon I
- La Midinette – Lisette and Chorus (New York production only)
- Finale Act II: Assent to no divorce I can – Catherine, Francois, Napoleon I, Adhemar and Courtiers

=== Act III ===
- Mirror, in thy glass we scan – Catherine
- A real good cry together – Catherine, Renée and Babette
- Though many a happy year hath flown – Catherine and Lefebvre
- Once the lips the Bourbon owned – Ladies and Courtiers
- Menuet
- The Legend Olden – Catherine and Napoleon I
- Finale Act III: Gavotte de Vestris – All

== Critical reception ==
Punch magazine found the musical "well-balanced", although the action was "somewhat hindered" by the interpolated numbers. Everybody's magazine declared that the music of Ivan Caryll has dignity and value and real melody with breadth and colour." The New York Times wrote that "From start to finish the whole piece went with a swing which delighted and held the audience."

== Gallery ==
Promotional photographs from The Play Pictorial, September 1903

Evie Greene, Lawrence Rea and Courtice Pounds, Act I

Evie Greene and Holbrook Blinn, Act I

Denis O'Sullivan as Lefebvre, Act II

Holbrook Blinn as Napoleon, Act II
