= Daly's Theatre (30th Street) =

Former theatre in Manhattan, New York

- Broadway Theatre
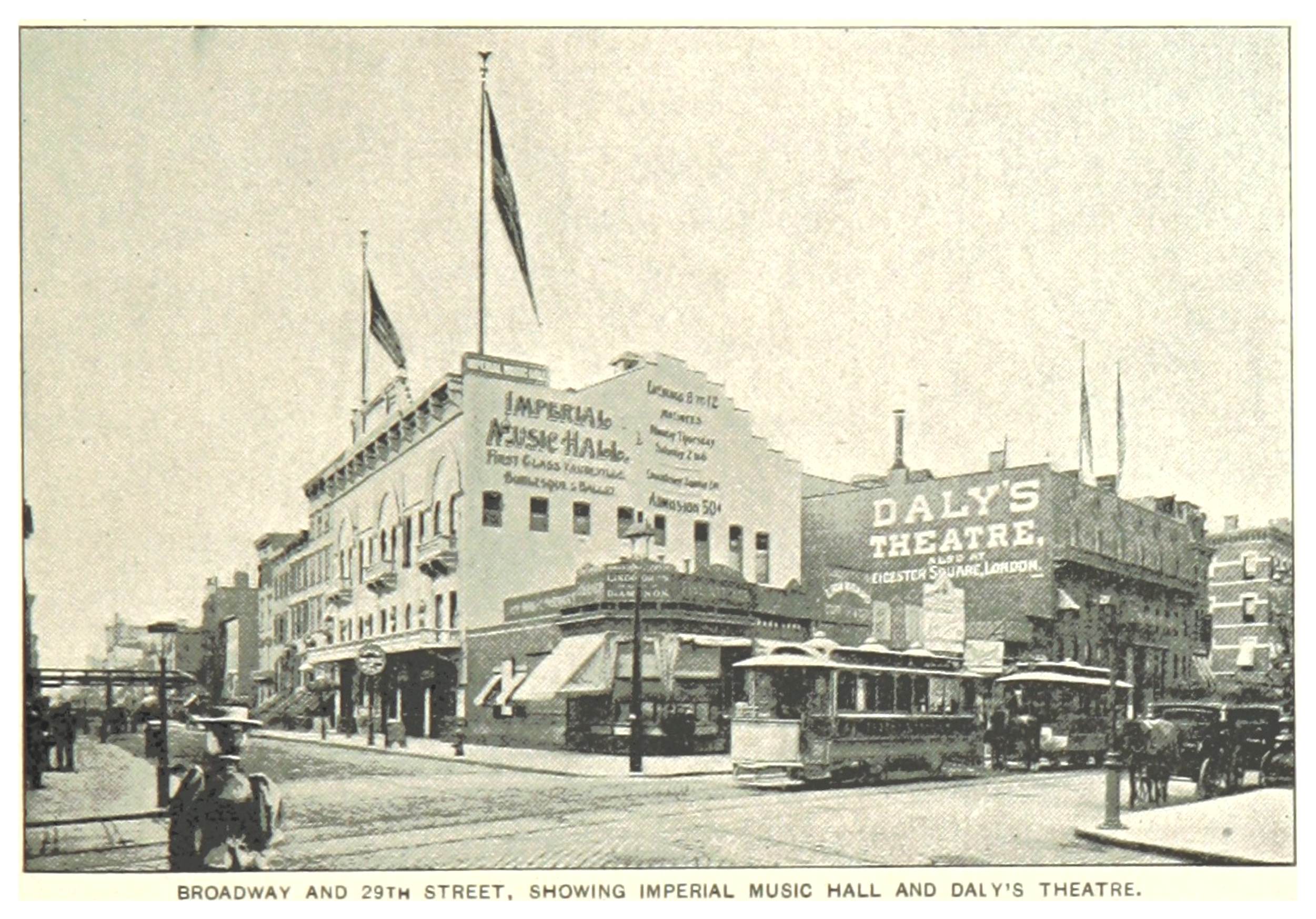
- Daly's Theatre, 1893 (right)
- Interactive map of Daly's Theatre
- Address: 1221 Broadway; New York City; United States of America
- Coordinates: 40.7465°N 73.9887°W
- Current use: none (demolished)

Construction
- Opened: 1867
- Closed: 1920

Daly's Theatre was a Broadway theatre at 1221 Broadway and 30th Street. It was built in 1867 and opened that year as Banvard's Museum but changed its name the following year to Wood's Museum and Metropolitan. In 1876 it became the Broadway Theatre, and finally was named Daly's Theatre in 1879 when it was acquired by Augustin Daly. After 1899, it was operated by the Shubert family. The building was demolished in 1920, after serving as a burlesque theatre and cinema.

== History ==
The theatre was built by John Banvard, who opened it in 1867 as a museum-theatre. Banvard sold the building the following year, and it was renamed for the new owner, Wood, who mounted musical Victorian burlesque and other productions of light musical comedy. Banvard regained control of the theatre in 1876 and renamed it the Broadway Theatre. Augustin Daly acquired the building in 1879 and renamed it for himself. There, he operated one of the last stock companies in New York City, presenting Edwardian musical comedy and other works. Daly died in 1899 and, for a time, the theatre was operated by the Shubert family. After 1912 it was operated as a burlesque house. For the last few years before it was demolished in 1920, it was used as a cinema.

The theatre's longest-running show was "'Twixt Axe and Crown", by Tom Taylor, which opened in 1870. Dion Boucicault's last play, A Tale of a Coat, opened at Daly's on August 14, 1890.

== Selected productions ==
- 1868–1869: Ixion; or, The Man at the Wheel, a Victorian burlesque by F. C. Burnand, with music by Michael Connolly, performed by Lydia Thompson's troupe
- 1870–188?: "'Twixt Axe and Crown", a play by Tom Taylor
- 1877: La Marjolaine, an opéra bouffe by Charles Lecocq
- 1879: H.M.S. Pinafore, a comic opera by Gilbert and Sullivan (unauthorized production with John Philip Sousa's orchestrations produced by Gorman's Philadelphia Church Choir Company)
- 1880: The Royal Middy, an English adaptation of Der Seekadet, a German comic opera by Richard Genée (music) and Friedrich Zell (text). Edward Mollenhauer adapted the music and Frederick James Williams (1829–1900) adapted the text.
- 1896–1897: The Geisha, an Edwardian Musical Comedy, with music by Sidney Jones, book by Owen Hall and lyrics by Harry Greenbank
- 1898 and 1900: A Runaway Girl, an Edwardian musical comedy, with music by Ivan Caryll and Lionel Monckton, book by Harry Nicholls and Seymour Hicks and lyrics by Aubrey Hopwood and Harry Greenbank
- 1899–1900: The Manoeuvres of Jane, a play by Henry Arthur Jones
- 1900: The Rose of Persia, a comic opera with music by Arthur Sullivan and a libretto by Basil Hood
- 1900, 1901 and 1902: San Toy, an Edwardian Musical Comedy, with music by Jones, book Edward Morton, lyrics by Adrian Ross and Harry Greenbank
- 1901–1902: The Messenger Boy, an Edwardian Musical Comedy, with music by Caryll and Monckton, book by Alfred Murray and James T. Tanner and lyrics by Ross and Percy Greenbank
- 1902: A Country Girl, an Edwardian Musical Comedy, with music by Monckton, book by Tanner and lyrics by Ross
- 1902–1903: The Billionaire, a musical comedy with music by Gustave Kerker and book and lyrics by Harry B. Smith
- 1903: Three Little Maids, and Edwardian musical comedy by Paul Rubens
- 1905: The Duchess of Dantzic, an Edwardian musical comedy with music by Caryll and book and lyrics by Henry Hamilton
- 1905: The Catch of the Season, an Edwardian musical comedy with music by Evelyn Baker and Herbert Haines, book by Cosmo Hamilton and Hicks and lyrics by Charles H. Taylor
- 1907: The Lancers, musical
- 1909: The Climax, a play by Edward Locke
- 1909–1910: The Belle of Brittany, an Edwardian musical comedy with music by Howard Talbot and Marie Horne, book by Leedham Bantock and P. J. Barrow and lyrics by Percy Greenbank
- 1912: Monsieur Beaucaire, a play by Booth Tarkington and Evelyn Greenleaf Sutherland
