= Maud Hobson =

Australian-born British actress (1860–1913)

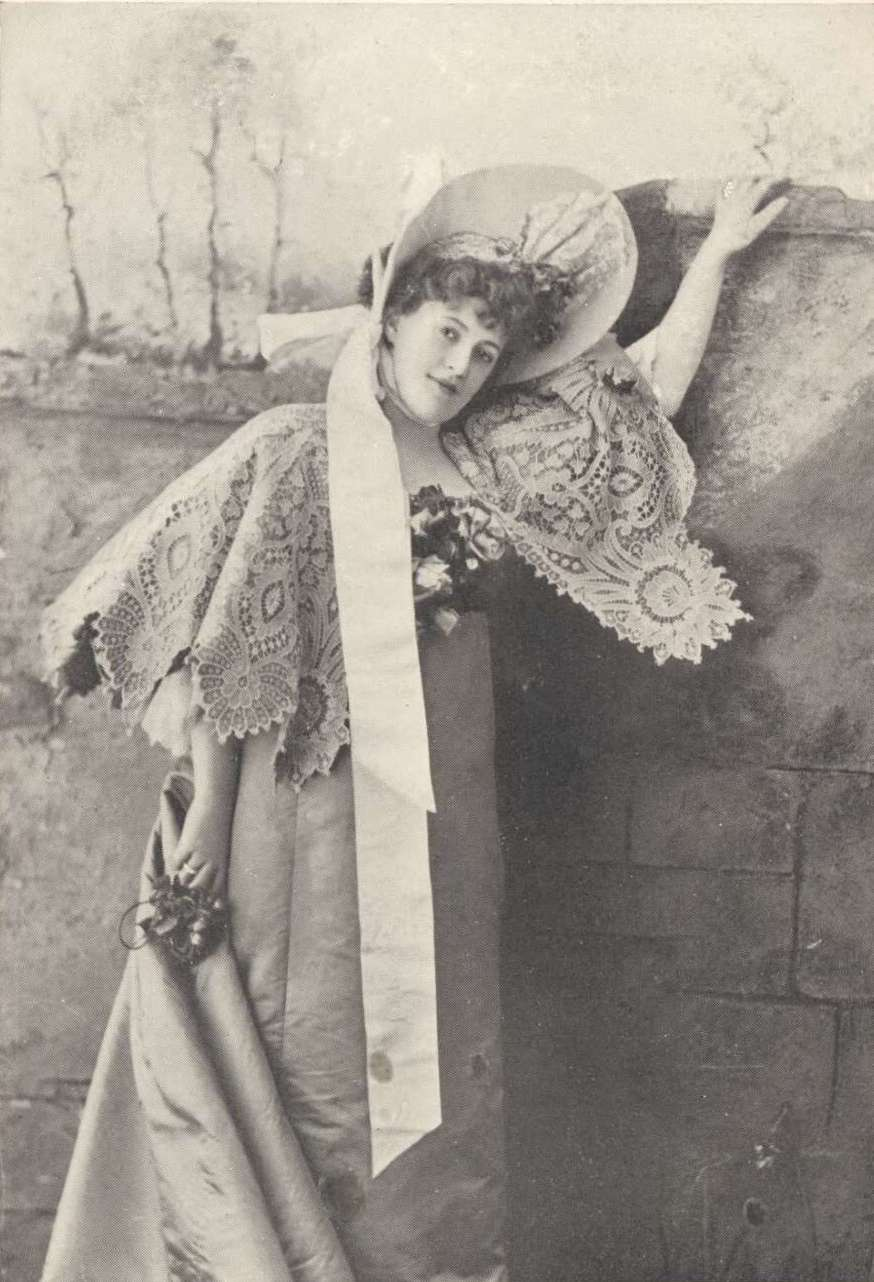
- Born: Jane Elizabeth Manson; 13 November 1860; Toorak, Australia
- Died: 7 January 1913 (aged 52); London, England
- Occupation: Actress
- Years active: 1889–1913

Maud Hobson (born Jane Elizabeth Manson; 13 November 1860 – 7 January 1913) was an Australian-born English actress. Beginning in Victorian burlesque in her uncle's Gaiety Theatre in London, she joined George Edwardes's company there after he took over as manager and became one of his Gaiety Girls. She also played principal roles in some of his Edwardian musical comedies.

== Early life ==
Hobson was born on 13 November 1860 in the suburb of Toorak, near Melbourne, Australia, to John Manson and Eliza née Hollingshead, who emigrated to Melbourne from England separately in 1853. When Hobson was 3 month old her family returned to England.

== Career ==
In 1880, Hobson started performing at the Gaiety Theatre where her uncle, John Hollingshead, was then the manager and suggested her stage name, Maud Hobson. The next year she got married and moved to Hawaii where she was occasionally performing. In 1886, Hobson returned to England and did not appear on the stage again until 1889. From mid-1889, Hobson reappeared on stage in London for George Edwardes, who had become manager at the Gaiety Theatre, playing parts there in the Victorian burlesques Faust up to Date and Carmen up to Data.

In 1893, Hobson played the part of Alma Somerset in the Edwardian musical comedy A Gaiety Girl produced at the Prince of Wales Theatre. In 1894 and 1896 she reappeared as a Gaiety Girl. Hobson has also done seasons in and out of parts at New York. She appeared in A Gaiety Girl at Daly's Theatre in New York, as well as in Boston, Philadelphia, Chicago, Milwaukee, and San Francisco.

By the time she was 30 Hobson had lived in Hawaii, Colorado, and London. She also visited Australia twice. Later Hobson moved to live with her uncle Hollingshead and his family in Kensington, London.

In 1900, Hobson appeared as Lady Punchestown in the musical The Messenger Boy at the Gaiety Theater.

== Personal life ==
In 1881 Hobson married Lieutenant Andrew Burrell Hayley, an officer of the 11th Hussars. The couple moved to Honolulu where Hayley acted as Chief Minister to King Kalakaua of Hawaii. Their son William Burrell Hayley was born in early 1882.

In 1887, Hayley petitioned for divorce from Hobson claiming that she repeatedly committed adultery with Captain Owen Richard Armstrong. Though Hobson and Armstrong denied the charges, a divorce was granted in 1888.

Maud Hobson died on 7 January 1913 in London. She is buried in the family grave at St.John the Evangelist, Sidcup.
