= Maie Saqui =

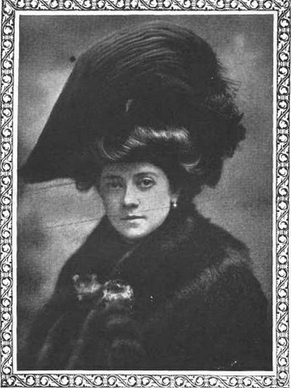
- Maie Saqui, from a 1907 publication.
- Born: May Vivian Saqui; 19 December 1879; Melbourne
- Died: March 27, 1907 (aged 27); London
- Occupation: Actress
- Known for: Gaiety Girl

Maie Saqui (19 December 1879 – 27 March 1907) was an Australian actress, dancer, and Gaiety Girl in London.

== Early life ==
May Vivian Saqui was born in the Fitzroy neighborhood of Melbourne, as the daughter of John Isaac "Jack" Saqui and Ester Barnett "Stella" Saqui. Both of her parents were born in London. Her younger sisters, Hazel and Gladys, were also actresses. They studied dance in Melbourne with their aunt, Julia Saqui Green.

"I started dancing when I was quite a child, and — well, I didn't stop, and I don't want to stop until I am old," Maie Saqui told a magazine in 1903.

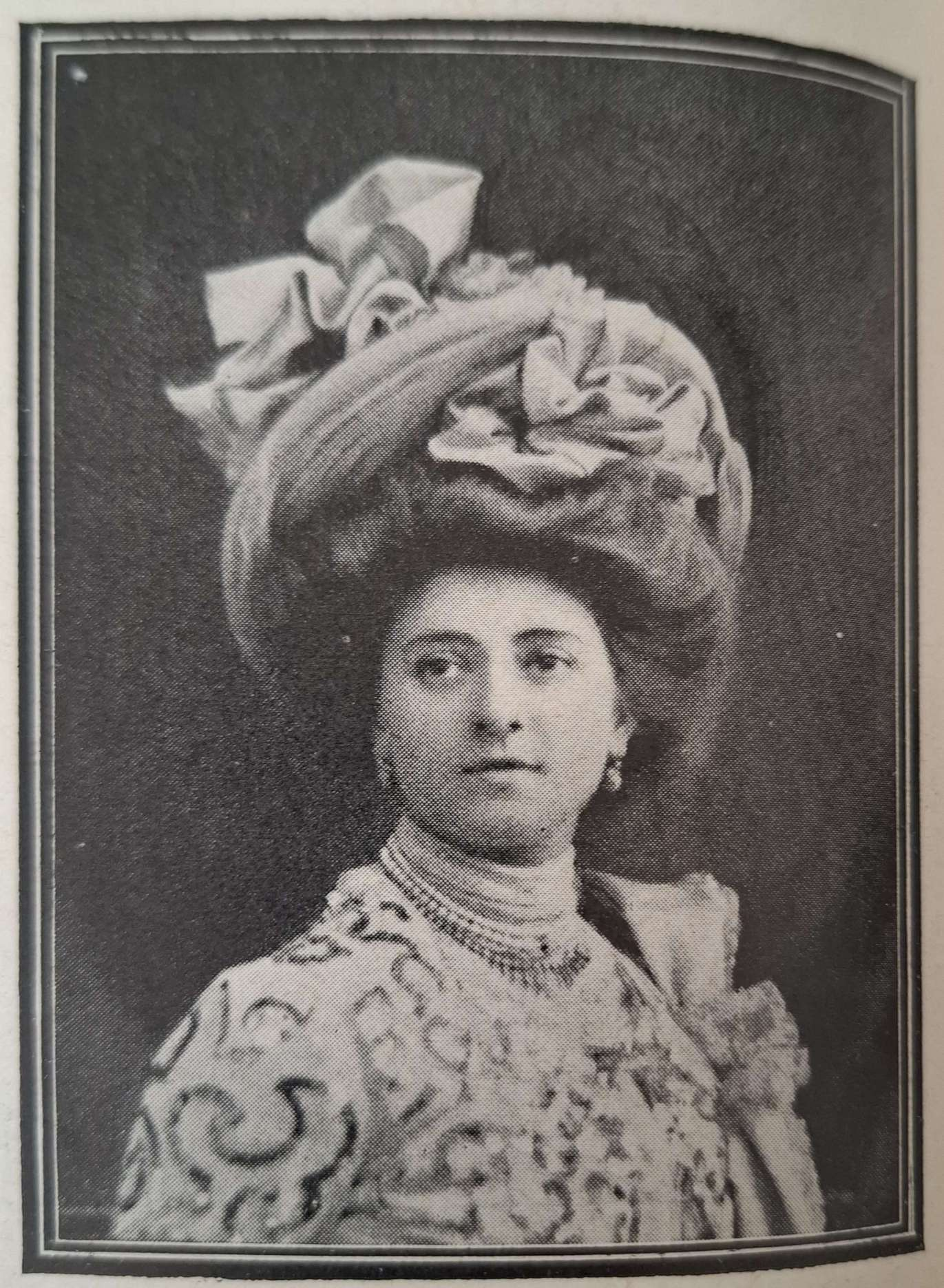
Photo of Maie Saqui as seen in the Black and White Budget, 10 November 1900.

Saqui's father was a gambler, who eventually lost the family's fortune and was institutionalised at Yarra Bend Asylum.

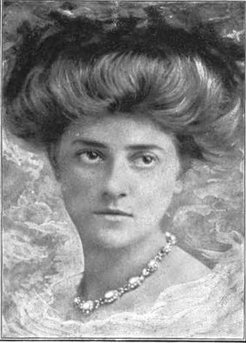
Maie Saqui, from a 1901 publication.

== Career ==
The Saqui sisters, Gladys, Maie, and Hazel, began their careers on the stage in Australia, then moved to England. Maie became a "Gaiety Girl", one of the musical performers connected to the Gaiety Theatre in London. She was in the original cast of The Toreador (1901). She also appeared on the London stage in The Circus Girl (1897), The Geisha (1897-1898), Harlequinade (1900), The Messenger Boy (1900-1901), Gilbert and Sullivan's Trial by Jury (1902) and The Linkman, or, Gaiety Memories (1903).

== Personal life ==
Maie Saqui married stockbroker Arthur Hope Travers in 1903, and retired from the stage. The couple had one child, Inez Hope.

She died in 1907, aged 27 years, in London.
