= Harry Grattan =

British actor, singer and dancer

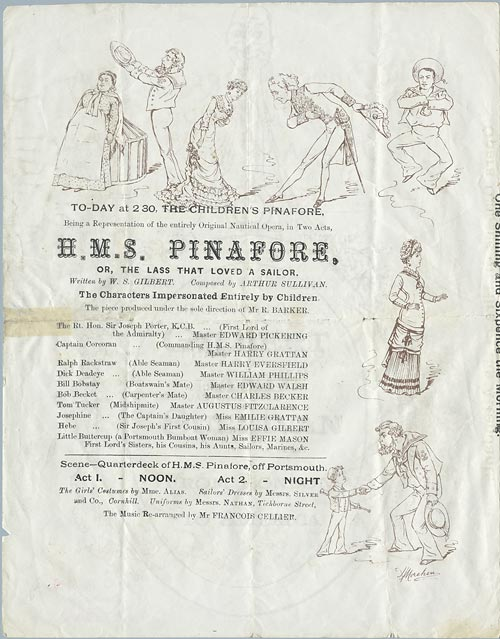
1880 programme for "Children's Pinafore"

Harry Grattan (c. 1867 – 25 September 1951) was a British stage actor, singer, dancer and writer best known for his performances in musical comedies in the decades around 1900.

== Life and career ==
Gratton started early as a child actor (along with his sister, Emilie), playing in Rip Van Winkle (1875), Slave Life (1875), Orson in 1876 (a show written for him and his sister by their father, H. P. Grattan), Little Goody Two-Shoes (1876) and Little Red Riding Hood; or, Harlequin Grandmama (1877). He played Captain Corcoran in the "Children's Pinafore" in 1879–80 at the Savoy Theatre (Emilie played Josephine). The Era wrote that, in the role, he was "very successful indeed, and looked the character completely."

As an adult, Grattan appeared at various West End theatres. For example, during the Christmas season of 1889, he appeared at the Avenue Theatre in The Field of the Cloth of Gold. With the advent of Edwardian musical comedy, Grattan became a star of such musicals as Morocco Bound (1894), Go-Bang (1894), As in a Looking Glass (1897) and Jim the Penman (1897). In the new century, he starred in a succession of hit musicals, including: The Messenger Boy (1900), The Toreador (1902), The Orchid (1904), The Spring Chicken (1905), The New Aladdin (1906, also choreographed by Grattan), Venus (1906), Miss Hook of Holland (1907), and More (1915; for which he was also the lyricist).

As a writer, he produced the book and lyrics for Hitchy-Koo (1917), which was a success on Broadway. and wrote the successful 1918 revue Tabs, with music by Ivor Novello and lyrics by Ronald Jeans. He wrote (and sometimes appeared in) a series of revues, including Odds and Ends, Erb and Emma, and Mind Your Backs during the World War I and into the 1920s, some of them produced by André Charlot and some with the child star Betty Bolton.
