= The Girls of Gottenberg =

Edwardian musical comedy

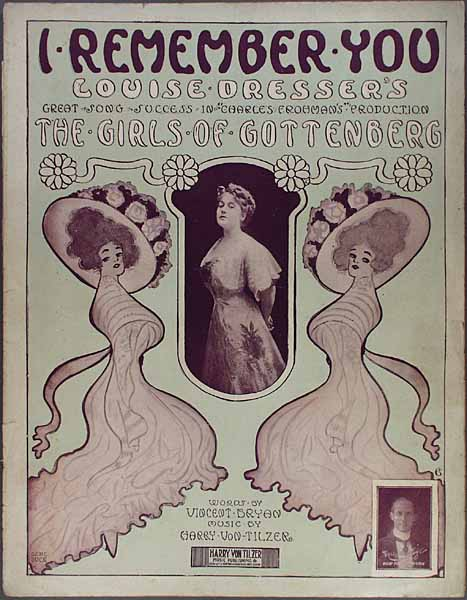
- Sheet music cover
- Music: Ivan Caryll and Lionel Monckton
- Lyrics: Adrian Ross and Basil Hood
- Book: George Grossmith, Jr. and L. E. Berman
- Productions: 1907 West End; 1908 Broadway

The Girls of Gottenberg is an Edwardian musical comedy in two acts by George Grossmith, Jr. and L. E. Berman, with lyrics by Adrian Ross and Basil Hood, and music by Ivan Caryll and Lionel Monckton. P. G. Wodehouse's personal papers indicate that he wrote the lyrics for one song, "Our Little Way", but this was not included in the libretto of show, and he was not credited as a lyricist. Set in Germany, the comedy of the show is largely based on stereotypes of the German people and their culture as seen through a British lens.

The musical opened at the Gaiety Theatre in London, managed by George Edwardes, on 15 May 1907, and ran for 303 performances. It starred George Grossmith, Jr., Edmund Payne and Gertie Millar. The young Gladys Cooper played the small role of Eva. The show also had a Broadway run at the Knickerbocker Theatre opening on 2 September 1908 and an Australian run. One of the best known songs from the show is "Berlin Is on the Spree".

Although this show was popular in London in 1907, it had competition from several very successful shows in that season, including the hit productions of The Merry Widow and Miss Hook of Holland.

== Musical numbers ==
Act I – Scene 1
The Barracks, Rottenberg

- No. 1. Chorus of Soldiers – "Ein! zwei! drei! Ein! zwei! drei!"
- No. 2. Fritz & Men's Chorus – "Of all the girls there is but one, no other can compare with her"
- No. 3. Trio & Dance - Otto, Hermann & Karl – "I hope your man is up to the plan, it needs a cheek infernal"

Act I – Scene 2
The Market Place, Gottenberg

- No. 4. Chorus of Town Girls & Students – "Oh, Market Day is merry, when lads a-courting go"
- No. 5. Minna & Chorus – "A lot of funny folks one sees at Ladies' Universities"
- No. 6. Chorus – "What is it, who is it coming so fast? Is it the Emperor's envoy at last?"
- No. 7. Max & Chorus – "I'm the Confidential Agent of the Kaiser"
- No. 8. Mitzi – "When I was ever so young, my father he said, 'Look here, you're a likely lass for serving a glass'"
- No. 9. Otto & Chorus – "My dear mother said to me at the early age of three"
- No. 10. Mitzi – "There's a little Hotel that I know very well on the banks of the beautiful Rhine"
- No. 11. Elsa – "When I was a Mädchen wee, gentlemen I oft would see turning round to look at me"
- No. 12. Finale Act I – "How splendid! We've ended our time of loneliness!"

Act II – The Gardens of "The Red Hen", across the River, near Gottenberg

- No. 13. Chorus and Kannenbier – "Jup, jup, jup, Tra la la la la"
- No. 14. Mitzi & Chorus – "I've heard in a wonderful legend of old that down in the Rhine is a treasure of gold"
- No. 15. Clementine & Max – "The birds in Spring-time are pairing; the dog-rose up on the bark"
- No. 16. Mitzi, Max & Otto – "When you go over to London, as lots of Germans do"
- No. 17. Dance – Albrecht & Kathie
- No. 18. Elsa – "On a night, a month since, at a dance I met with a man to woo me"
- No. 19. Elsa & Otto – "Won't you come and two-step, little girl, with me?"
- No. 20. Mitzi & Max – "Once in the window of a ham and beef shop two little sausages sat! "
- No. 21. Minna & Chorus – "Ach! vat a joysome day when soldiers come our way"
- No. 22. Minna, Freda, Katrina, Lucille & Brittlbottl – "Officers' girls have lots of fun"
- No. 23. Mitzi & Chorus – "There are places on the map that I never want to see, such as London (on the Thames)"
- No. 24. Finale Act II – "Berlin is on the Spree, and that's the place we want to see" (short reprise of No. 23)

Addenda

- No. 25. Extra song: Mitzi – "To hold my own with ladies high was always my ambition"
- No. 26. Extra song: Mitzi & Chorus – "In Frankfurt town there lives a charming German gentleman"
- No. 27. Extra duet: Elsa & Otto, with Chorus – "Maiden who brings the beer, won't you let me marry you, my dear?"

== Character list and original cast ==
Postcard advertising the musical

- Otto (Prince of Saxe-Hildesheim) - George Grossmith, Jr.
- Brittlbottl (Sergeant of Hussars) - Robert Nainby
- General the Margrave OF Saxe-Nierstein - Eustace Burnaby
- Officers of the Blue Hussars:
  - Colonel Finkhausen - A. J. Evelyn
  - Fritz - T. C. Maxwell
  - Hermann - Harold Thorley
  - Franz - Somers Bellamy
  - Karl - George Grundy
- Albrecht (Captain of Dragoons) - J. Robert Hale
- Burgomaster - George Miller
- Kannenbier (An Innkeeper) - Arthur Hatherton
- Adolf (Town Clerk) - Charles Brown
- Corporal Riethen - J. R. Sinclair
- Private Schmidt - S. Hansworth
- Private Max Moddelkopf -Edmund Payne
- Elsa (The General's Daughter) - May de Sousa
- Clementine (The Burgomaster's Daughter) - Violet Halls
- Lucille (Maid to Elsa) - Olive May
- Kathie - Kitty Mason
- Hana - Edith Lee
- Hilda - Kitty Lindley
- Minna (Captain of College) - Jean Aylwin
- Freda (Head of the Alemannia Corps) - Olive Wade
- Anna (Head of the Pomerania Corps) - Mary Hobson
- Eva (Head of the Saxonia Corps) - Gladys Cooper
- Lina (Head of the Borussia Corps) - Julia James
- Katrina (The only Girl in Rottenberg) - Kitty Hanson
- Barbara Briefmark (The Postmaster's Daughter) - Enid Leonhardt
- Betty Brencastler (The Doctor's Daughter) - Tessie Hackney
- Mitzi (The Innkeeper's Daughter) - Gertie Millar
