= Betty Bolton =

British actress (1906–2005)

Betty Bolton (7 January 1906 – 2 April 2005) was a British actress, beginning as a child star during World War I and continuing her career in the 1920s and 1930s. She was one of the first performers to appear on early British television.

== Early life and career ==
Bolton made her debut in 1916, at the age of 10, in a revue called Some, at the Vaudeville Theatre in London. Gertrude Lawrence was the principal dancer. Bolton's mother Maud was a West End stage manager. 'Betty', as she was originally billed (no surname), played in several revues by Harry Grattan, such as Odds and Ends and Mind Your Backs during World War I, some of them produced by Andr Charlot, playing precocious children. Photographs from two of these revues, including Cheep (1917) and Back Again (1919), show her remarkable powers of facial expression. The last show in which she performed as a child was the musical fantasy Fifinella, in late 1919.

== Adult career ==
Bolton was a versatile performer, appearing in almost every branch of entertainment available in the 1920s and early 1930s: revues, straight plays, films, and recordings.

== Television ==
Bolton was one of the first performers to appear on early British television, featuring thirty times on 30-line television between 1930 and 1935, 18 of which were on Baird Television from Long Acre in London.

== Marriage ==
Bolton married in 1936 and her career stopped afterwards. She had at least one daughter, Judyth Knight.
