= Queenie Leighton =

British music hall star of the Edwardian era

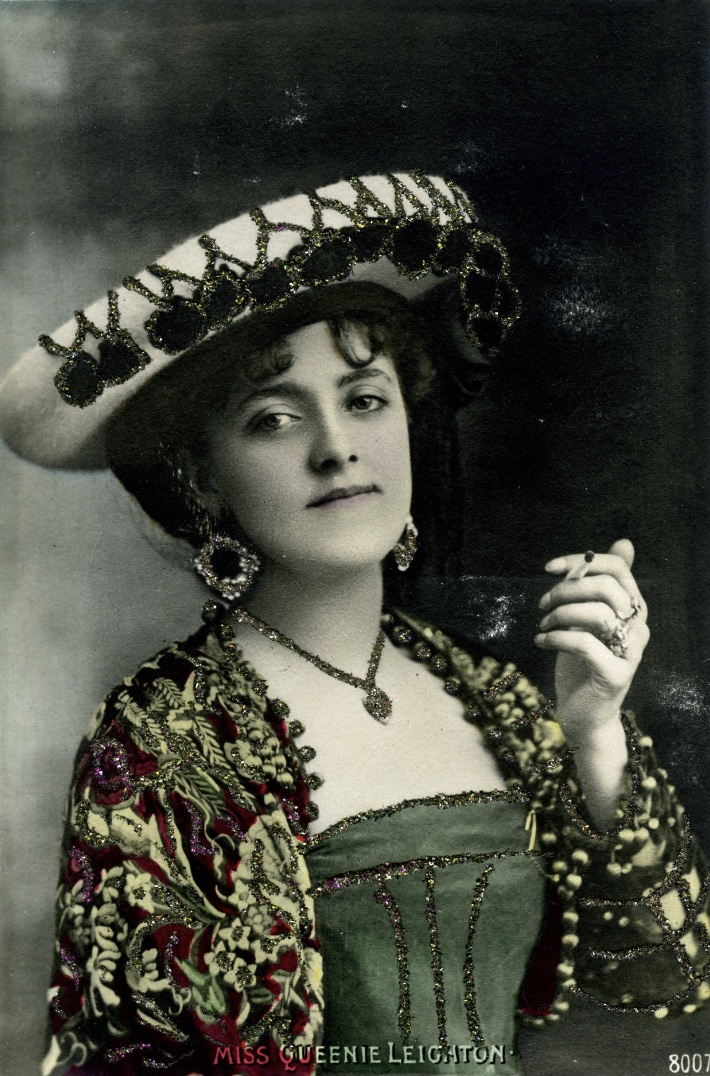
Queenie Leighton c.1906

Queenie Leighton (18 July 1874 – 19 November 1943) was a British music hall star of the Edwardian era.

Leighton was born in Islington in London as Lilian Caroline Augusta Rickard, the youngest of three children of William Henry Rickard, a parliamentary agent, and Fanny Harriett Rickard. In 1881 her mother and sister were recorded as actresses living in London's theatre district off The Strand, and Leighton started to become known as a child star. Her tall stately appearance, hourglass figure and auburn hair gained her starring roles. In 1898 Leighton married a surgeon, William Hotten George; he was ten years older than her and was dead by 1908. By this time Leighton had a successful stage career in London.

Queenie Leighton as Principal Boy (c.1906)

She was a much loved principal boy in a number of Drury Lane theatre pantomimes. Women dressed in drag were becoming fashionable in the Edwardian theatre and Leighton was a popular artist in this genre. She appeared as Prince Charming, Dick Whittington, Sinbad, Aladdin and in other musical plays. In 1901 she appeared as Doña Teresa in The Toreador.

Leighton went on tour but whilst appearing as Sinbad in Bradford she had an accident, falling off a stage whale during the performance. She recovered but did not continue to play the leads at Drury Lane afterwards.

In 1911 Leighton met young music hall manager Frederick Charles Cockerill (1882–1953); at the start of the 1914-18 War Cockerill received a commission in the Artists' Rifles and in 1915 he and Leighton married.

Leighton was one of the many stage artists who came under pressure to recruit soldiers through their performances with much emphasis on the patriotic aspect of their songs such as I'll Make a Man Out of You. Leighton was reported to have followed up her act at the Royal Hippodrome, Dover, with a tour of the town depositing 'half a dozen young recruits at Dover town hall'. Cockerill was injured and returned to his home town of Northampton where Leighton continued her recruiting work from The New Theatre, Northampton in 1918.

During World War I Leighton appeared in the silent film Screen Struck (1916), but she was not a success and her career began to fail from this time. Her second and final film was Under the Greenwood Tree (1929).

Leighton died in Farnworth in Lancashire in 1943. She did not have any children from either of her marriages.
