= The New Aladdin =

Payne (Tippin) and Grossmith (The Genie)

Lily Elsie as Lally

The New Aladdin is an Edwardian musical comedy in two acts by James T. Tanner and W. H. Risque, with music by Ivan Caryll, Lionel Monckton, and additional numbers by Frank E. Tours, and lyrics by Adrian Ross, Percy Greenbank, W. H. Risque, and George Grossmith, Jr. It was produced by George Edwardes at the Gaiety Theatre, opening on 29 September 1906 and running for 203 performances.

The London production starred Grossmith, Harry Grattan (who also choreographed), Lily Elsie, Edmund Payne and Gaby Deslys (making her London debut). Gertie Millar, the established star of the Gaiety soon became available and replaced Elsie in the leading role, but shortly thereafter The Merry Widow made Elsie a big star.

The Aladdin story had been dramatised extensively in England before and was very popular in pantomime versions, but this was the first book musical on the subject.

P. G. Wodehouse wrote a comic dramatisation of the creation of The New Aladdin called "The Cooks and the Gaiety Broth" as part of Plum Punch: The Life of Writers.

== Cast ==
- Genie of the Lamp – George Grossmith, Jr.
- Cadi (A disgraced ambassador) – Arthur Hatherton
- Ebenezer (Lally's uncle) – Harry Grattan
- General Ratz (Imperial aide-de-camp) – Robert Nainby
- The Lost Constable – Alfred Lester
- The Ideal Man – Charles Brown
- Billy Pauncefort, Reggie Tighe, Tony Cavendish (The Romano party) – Eustace Burnaby, J. R. Sinclair, S. Hansworth
- A tax collector – J. W. Birtley
- Tippin (Ebenezer's page) – Edmund Payne
- The Princess – Adrienne Augarde
- Laolah (Cadi's daughter) – Olive May
- Jennie (Maid to the Princess) – Jean Aylwin
- Mrs. Tippin – Winifred Dennis
- Winnie Fairfax – Kitty Mason
- Flo Cartaret – Doris Beresford
- Di Tollemache – Enid Leonhardt
- Kit Lomax – Tessie Hackney
- Vi Cortelyon – Gladys Desmond
- May Warrener – Florence Lindley
- Nan Jocelyn – Violet Walker
- Madge Oliphant – Edna Loftus
- Millie Farquhar – Minnie Baker
- The Charm of Paris – Gaby Deslys
- Spirit of the Ring – Connie Ediss
- Lally (Ebenezer's nephew) – Lily Elsie (replaced by Gertie Millar)

== Musical numbers ==
Act I - Scene 1 - The Interior of Ebenezer's Antique Shop in Bond Street

- No. 1 - Lally and Chorus of Girls - "Dear little lady whose portrait I see..."
- No. 2 - Tippin and Chorus - "Who would be a "Boy," nothing to enjoy..."
- No. 3 - Lally, Spirit, Tippin and Ebenezer - "Let us fly upon the wing of the Spirit of the Ring..."

Act I - Scene 2 - A Palace in Far Cathay

- No. 4 - Chorus - "Oriental belles languidly reposing..."
- No. 4a - Cadi and Chorus - "I am the Cadi, calm and cool and seldom in a fury O..."
- No. 5 - Lally and Princess - "When first I looked at your face, Princess, in a gold and miniature case..."
- No. 6 - Spirit and Tippin - "Out of the boundless blue..."
- No. 7 - Concerted Number - Princess, Ebenezer, Cadi, Tippin, Maid, Ratz, Spirit & Lally - "How rashly you behave..."
- No. 8 - Genie and Chorus - "Oh, the lamp which used to gladd'n once the heart of young Aladd'n..."
- No. 9 - Genie and others - "We're taking a trip in a hop or a skip..."
- No. 10 - Princess - "I'm a maiden who is rather modest..."
- No. 11 - Ebenezer, Cadi and Ratz - "Oh, I have a great big head..."
- No. 12 - Finale - Act I - "We have had a most exciting day..."

Act II - The Ideal London

- No. 13 - Chorus - "Rubbing our eyes in surprise..."
- No. 14 - Concerted Number - "I've brought you over and set you down in the last edition of London Town..."
- No. 15 - Concerted Number - "Je suis Le Charme de Paris! In English that will be personified Paree!"
- No. 16 - Chorus - "At the close of night when the sun shone bright, then we ceased to be hilarious..."
- No. 17 - Lally - "If you would like to lead the fashion of quite the swellest set..."
- No. 18 - Genie and Chorus - "If you ever go down to a popular town on the coast when the summer is hot..."
- No. 19 - Princess and Genie - "I want to tell something to someone, and there's no one about that I know..."
- No. 20 - Charm of Paris - "When in summertime I go to some place mondaine..."
- No. 21 - Tippin and Genie - "There's a set that you've lately been told to avoid..."
- No. 22 - Ebenezer, Cadi and Ratz - "An Englishman, a German!"
- No. 23 - Finale - Act II - "London, here in London the ideal will not all be undone..."

Addenda

- No. 24 - Lally and Chorus - "When Grandmamma was young, such modesty possessed her..."
- No. 25 - Lally - "When the shades of night are softly creepin' up across the gardens at the Zoo..."
- No. 26 - Lally - "There's a little question people ask you now and then..."
- No. 27 - Lally and Tippin - "We are only 'umble costers and uneducated chaps..."
- No. 28 - Dance
- No. 29 - Spirit and Chorus - "Some people may talk of taking a walk..."
