= The Geisha =

Edwardian musical comedy

- a story of a tea house
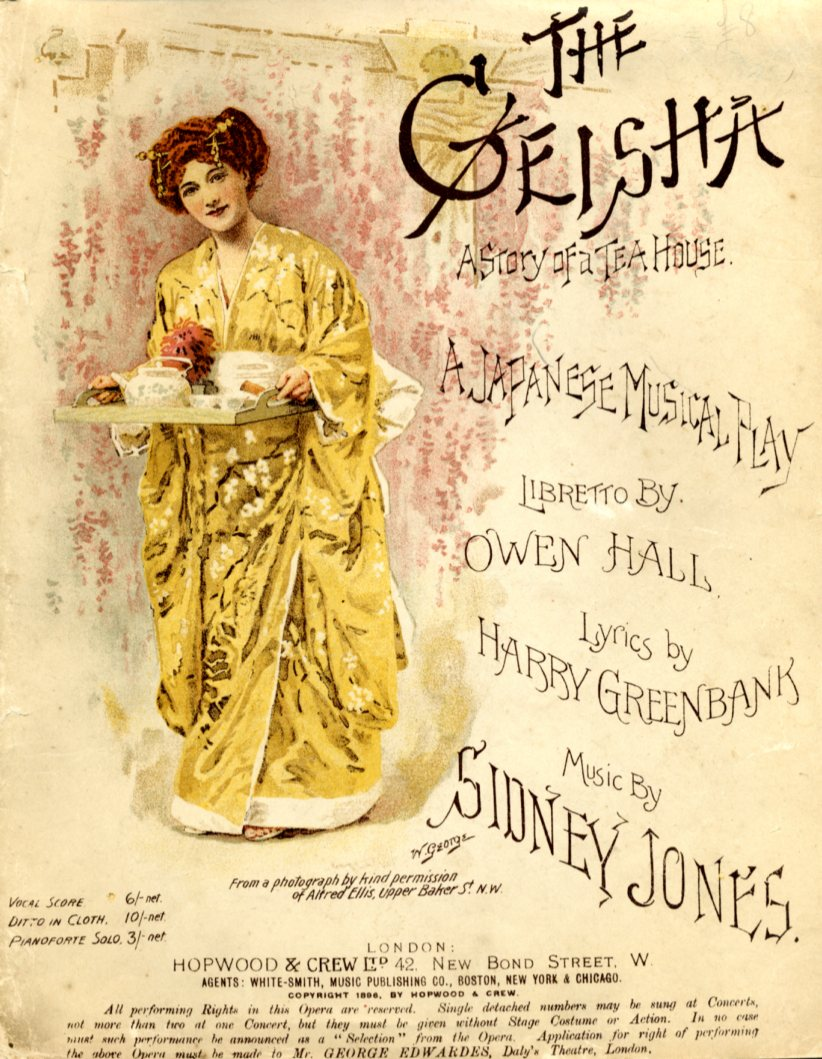
- Vocal Score
- Music: Sidney Jones; Lionel Monckton
- Lyrics: Harry Greenbank; James Philip
- Book: Owen Hall
- Productions: 1896 West End

The Geisha, a story of a tea house is an Edwardian musical comedy in two acts. The score was composed by Sidney Jones to a libretto by Owen Hall, with lyrics by Harry Greenbank. Additional songs were written by Lionel Monckton and James Philp.

The Geisha opened in 1896 at Daly's Theatre in London's West End, produced by George Edwardes. The original production had the second longest run of any musical up to that time. The cast starred Marie Tempest and C. Hayden Coffin, with dancer Letty Lind and comic Huntley Wright. The show was an immediate success abroad, with an 1896 production starring Dorothy Morton in New York and numerous tours and productions in Europe and beyond. It continued to be popular until World War II and even beyond to some degree. The most famous song from the show is "The Amorous Goldfish".

== Background and productions ==
The success of An Artist's Model in 1895 had set the pattern for the Hall, Greenbank and Jones Edwardian musical comedies. Edwardes immediately put his team to work on a new musical.

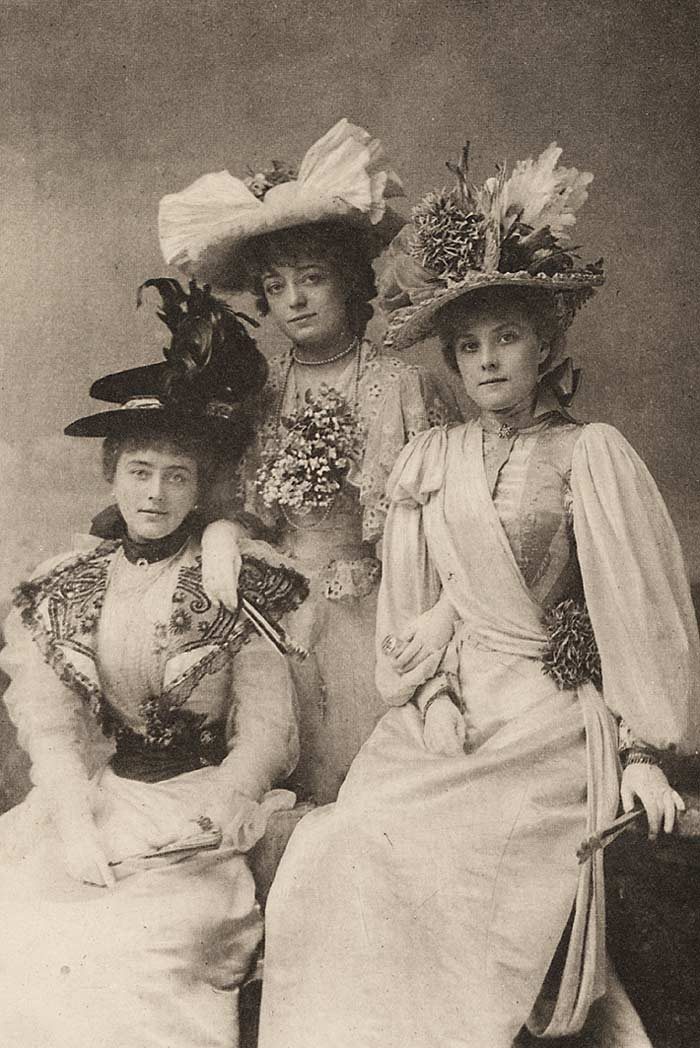
Gaiety Girls in The Geisha: Alice Davis (left), Blanche Massey (centre), Hetty Hamer (right)

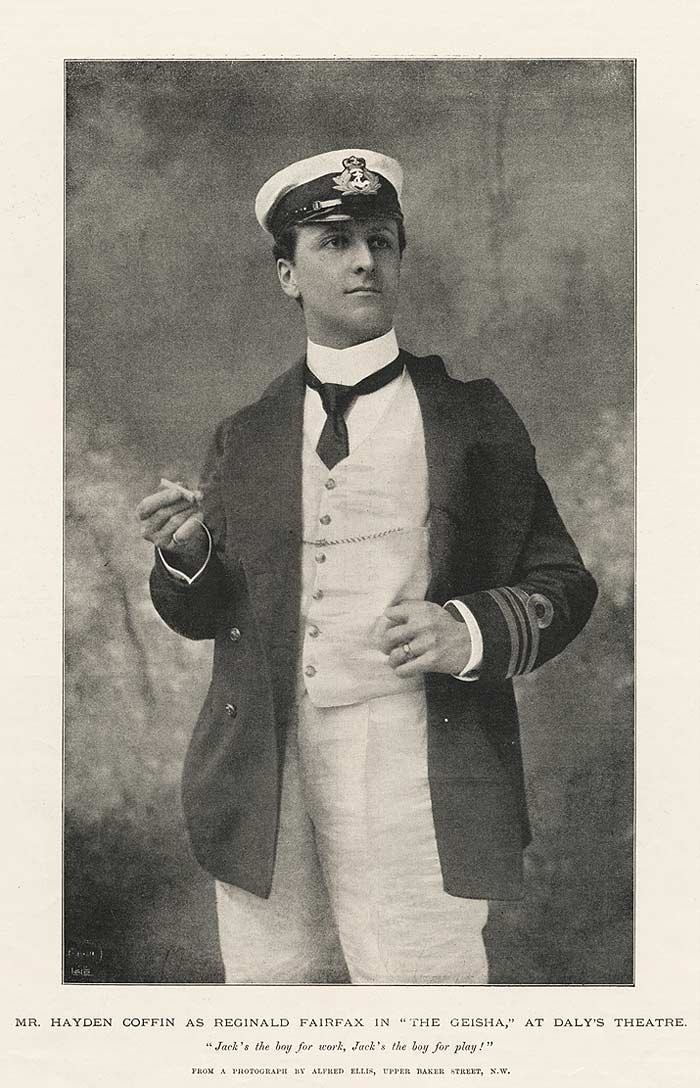
Hayden Coffin as Reginald Fairfax

The Geisha was first performed on 25 April 1896 at Daly's Theatre in London, produced by George Edwardes. The original production ran for 760 performances. This run, the second longest of any musical up to that time, would be beaten three years later by Edwardes' San Toy, which was written by Jones, Greenbank and Monckton. The cast included Marie Tempest in the role of O Mimosa San and Letty Lind as the dancing soubrette Molly Seamore. C. Hayden Coffin played Lieutenant Reginald Fairfax, Huntley Wright played Wun-Hi, and later Hilda Moody, Rutland Barrington and Scott Russell joined the cast. Direction was by J. A. E. Malone, choreography by Willie Warde and costumes by Percy Anderson. The music director was Ernest Ford. Edwardes took advantage of the continuing fascination of the public with the orient that had brought such success to Gilbert and Sullivan in The Mikado. However, The Geisha was a more topical entertainment than The Mikado, and despite its great initial popularity, The Geisha and the many other topical oriental Edwardian musicals, such as San Toy, A Chinese Honeymoon and even Chu Chin Chow did not endure through the decades as well as The Mikado.

Jones, aiming for a light, breezy score, kept each of his musical numbers under three minutes, except that the finales ran to about five. In addition to oriental shadings, Jones's music borrowed from continental European dance rhythms. Hall had taken some of the sauciness out of his style, since An Artist's Model, and evolved a combination of sprightly, up-to-date comedy and old-fashioned romance, into which he would insert parodies when the opportunity arose. Indeed, the Daly's Theatre shows were more romantic in character than the sillier Gaiety Theatre shows. Still, these musicals hewed to most of the features that made the Gaiety Theatre shows popular, especially Edwardes' pretty Gaiety Girls, dressed in the latest fashions. Many of the best-known London couturiers designed costumes for stage productions. The illustrated periodicals were eager to publish photographs of the actresses in the latest stage hits, and so the theatre became an excellent way for clothiers to publicise their latest fashions. The Gaiety Girls were, as The Sketch noted in its 1896 review of The Geisha, "clothed in accordance with the very latest and most extreme modes of the moment, and the result is a piquantly striking contrast, as you may imagine." The next musical for the Hall, Greenbank and Jones team moved from Japan to Ancient Rome, with A Greek Slave.

The Geisha was also an immediate success abroad, with an 1896–97 production in New York at Daly's Theatre (starring Dorothy Morton, replaced by Nancy McIntosh in November). It became the biggest international sensation that the British musical theatre had ever known. It enjoyed other productions in America and played for thousands of performances on the European continent (one source counts some 8,000 in Germany alone). It has been "ranked as the first internationally successful British musical," helping to introduce the previously obscure term "Geisha" into many languages as a symbol of Japanese culture. In 1897, Robert Baden-Powell appeared in the role of Wun-hi in Simla, India. Two years later, Anton Pavlovich Chekhov was present at its premiere in the Russian resort town of Yalta and mentions the show as a backdrop to the climactic scene in one of his best-known stories, "The Lady with the Dog" (1899).

The musical continued to tour for a few decades in Britain, receiving its last major revival in 1934, although lesser productions continued into the 1950s, and it was popular with amateur theatre groups, particularly in Britain, from World War I into the 1960s.

== Principal roles and original cast ==
The following were in the original cast:

- O Mimosa San, Chief geisha (soprano) – Marie Tempest (later replaced by Hilda Moody)
- Lady Constance Wynne, An English visitor (contralto) – Maud Hobson
- Molly Seamore, A guest of Lady Constance (mezzo-soprano) – Letty Lind
- Katana, Captain of the guard (tenor) – William Philp
- Reginald Fairfax, Of the Royal Navy (baritone) – Hayden Coffin
- Dick Cunningham (tenor) – W. Louis Bradfield (later replaced by Farren Soutar)
- Wun-Hi, A Chinaman, proprietor of the Tea House (baritone) – Huntley Wright
- Marquis Imari Chief of Police and Governor of the Province (baritone) – Harry Monkhouse (later replaced by Rutland Barrington)
- Lieutenant Arthur Cuddy (tenor) – Leedham Bantock
- Juliette Diamant, A French girl, interpreter at the Tea House (soprano) – Juliette Nesville
- English ladies, guests of Lady Constance: Misses Marie Worthington, Ethel Hurst, Mabel Grant and Louie Plumpton – Blanche Massey, Hetty Hamer, Alice Davis and Margaret Fraser

== Synopsis ==
=== Act I ===
Poster advertising a 1906 production in Scarborough

Stationed in Japan, far from his fiancée Molly, Lt. Reggie Fairfax of the Royal Navy is lonely. He begins to spend much of his free time at the Tea House of Ten Thousand Joys which is run by Chinaman Wun-Hi. There he meets the geisha O Mimosa San, with whom he builds a friendship, but she is in love with Katana, a soldier, so she discourages him with her tale of 'The Amorous Goldfish'. However, Reggie gives Mimosa a lesson in kissing.

The relationship does not go unnoticed by Lady Constance Wynne, a touring English aristocrat, who catches Reggie engaged in his tête-a-tête with Mimosa and reminds him that he is engaged to Molly. Lady Constance contacts Molly, telling her to travel to Japan as quickly as possible. The local overlord Marquis Imari, who also fancies Mimosa, is annoyed that his intended bride is consorting with the newly-arrived British sailors, and he orders that the teahouse be closed and the girls be sold off. The Marquis himself is pursued by the French interpreter Juliette.

Molly arrives unexpectedly. Left alone, Molly is joined by Mimosa and Lady Constance, who tell her how fond Reggie has become of one geisha in particular. Mimosa then suggests that Molly should dress up as a geisha herself to try and win him back. It is now time for the sale of the geishas' indentures. The Marquis tries to buy Mimosa for himself, but Lady Constance manages to outbid him to keep her out of his clutches. Unfortunately, she cannot stop him from purchasing lot number 2, a new geisha called Roli Poli whom nobody has seen before. Only after the Marquis has made his purchase is it revealed that this geisha is actually Molly in disguise.

=== Act II ===
In the chrysanthemum gardens of the Imari palace, Molly, still disguised as Roli Poli, awaits her impending marriage to the Marquis, who has become much attracted to her. Mimosa proposes a plan to save Molly from her fate: Mimosa will sneak into the bridal suite and exchange the veiled Molly for another veiled bride - Juliette, the French interpreter.

The wedding ceremony starts, and the plan is put into effect: Juliette is exchanged with Molly, and the Marquis unwittingly marries the wrong bride. On discovering the ruse, he accepts his fate philosophically, concluding that "every man is disappointed in his wife at some time or other". Mimosa is now free to marry her lover Katana, and Molly is re-united with Reggie, declaring that she would never marry a foreign nobleman when she could have a British sailor.

== Musical numbers ==
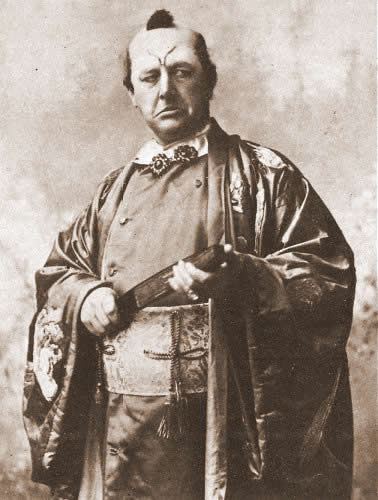
Rutland Barrington as Imari in The Geisha

=== Act I ===
- Chorus - Happy Japan – "Dawns the day in Eastern sky"
- Entrance of Officers – Here They Come
- Cunningham – The Dear Little Jappy-Jap-Jappy - "There came to the land of Japan"
- Mimosa – The Amorous Goldfish - "A goldfish swam in a big glass bowl"
- Mimosa and Fairfax – The Kissing Duet - "You're a charming little geisha"
- Geishas and Officers – "If you will come to tea"
- Chorus of Lamentation – "Oh, will they sell our master up"
- Fairfax and Officers – We're Going to Call on the Marquis - "This infamous lord shall have his reward"
- Molly and Fairfax – The Toy Duet - "When I was but a tiny tot"
- Mimosa – "A geisha's life imagination tints"
- Fairfax and Officers – Jack's the Boy: "Of all the lads that be" (sometimes placed third; composed by Lionel Monckton)
- Recitative (Takamini, Imari & Chorus) – "Attention, pray! and silence if you please"
- Molly and Chorus – Chon Kina - "I'm the smartest little geisha in Japan"
- Finale: "Though of staying too long you're accusing us"

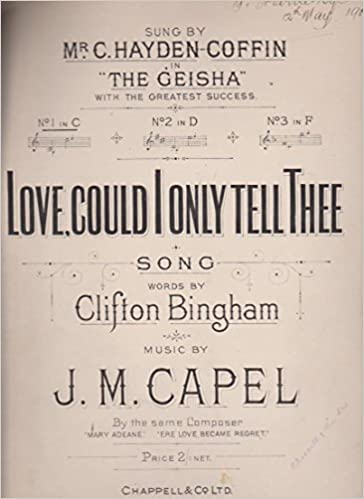
Sheet music cover of "Love, Could I Only Tell Thee"

=== Act II ===
- Entr'Acte
- Chorus – "Day born of love, of gladness and delight"
- Molly – The Toy Monkey (composed by Lionel Monckton) - "Poor little maiden who loves a bit of fun"
- Juliette and Wun-Hi – Ching-a-Ring-a-Ree! - "When I want anything done"
- Fairfax, Cunningham and Cuddy – Jolly Young Jacks Are We - "Half round the world we've been my boys" (supplementary number)
- Geisha, Officers and Cunninghame – "Geisha are we"
- Mimosa – The Jewel of Asia - "A small Japanese once sat at her ease" (supplementary number; music by James Philp)
- Fairfax – Star of my Soul - "How can I wait when she I worship only"
- Mimosa, Fairfax, Cunningham and Wun Hi – What Will the Marquis do? - "When he finds that his dear little lovebird's gone" (supplementary number)
- Juliette – "If That's Not Love, What Is? - "To win the man"
- Entrance of Chorus – Japanese March
- Entrance of Geisha – "With splendour auspicious"
- Wun Hi and Chorus – Chin Chin Chinaman - "Chinaman no money makee"
- Mimosa and Chorus – Love! Love! "Upon your bride so coy and cold"
- Cunningham – "Hey diddle diddle, when man is in love" - "He's longing to marry a dear little bride"
- Molly and Chorus – The Interfering Parrot - "A parrot once resided in a pretty gilded cage"
- Finale – Before Our Eyes - "Before our eyes the prospect lies"

=== Supplementary songs ===
During the long original run of the show, songs were added to and deleted from the performances. Some of these are listed in contemporary vocal scores as "Supplementary songs":

- Mimosa – "I can't refrain from laughing" (Music by Napoleon Lambelet)
- Imari and Chorus – The Wedding: "Then come and join the beautiful feast" (Words by Adrian Ross)
- Fairfax – Molly Mine: "Here among the flowers, Molly mine" (Words by Ross)
- Imari – "It's Coming Off Today": "Oh, I'm longing to be married"
- Juliette – "C'est Moi!": "Under your window, mon cher Marquis, one little heart is beating" (Music by Frank E. Tours)

=== Published only as a separate song ===
- Fairfax – "Love Could I Only Tell Thee" (Words by Graham Clifton Bingham, Music by John Mais Capel)

== Recordings ==
The first complete recording of the musical was made in London in 1998 by Hyperion, with the New London Light Opera and Orchestra, conducted by Ronald Corp, with Lillian Watson as O Mimosa San, Sarah Walker as Molly, Richard Suart as Wun-Hi and Christopher Maltman as Fairfax.
