= The Toreador =

Edwardian musical comedy

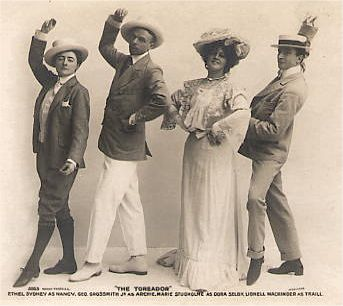
Scene from The Toreador

The Toreador is an Edwardian musical comedy in two acts by James T. Tanner and Harry Nicholls, with lyrics by Adrian Ross and Percy Greenbank and music by Ivan Caryll and Lionel Monckton. It opened at the Gaiety Theatre in London, managed by George Edwardes, on 17 June 1901 and ran for an extremely successful 675 performances. It starred Marie Studholme, Gertie Millar, Harry Grattan, Edmund Payne, George Grossmith, Jr. and the young Sidney Bracy. Gabrielle Ray later joined the cast. The show also enjoyed Broadway runs in 1902 and 1904 and toured internationally.

Key songs include "Captivating Cora", "I'm Romantic", "When I Marry Amelia", "Keep Off the Grass", and "Archie".

As was customary for musicals at the time, other songs were interpolated into the show. For example Christie MacDonald performed "Moon, Moon" in the show, which was written by Nathaniel D. Mann.

== Roles and original cast ==
Drawing of Edmund Payne as Sammy Gigg

- Augustus Traill (of the British Consulate at Villaya) – Lionel Mackinder
- Pettifer (a dealer in wild animals) – Fred. Wright, Junr.
- Sir Archibald Slackitt, Bart. (Lieut. Welsh Guards) – George Grossmith, Jr.
- Rinaldo (Carlist) – Robert Nainby
- Governor of Villaya – Harry Grattan
- Bandmaster – Willie Warde
- Carajola (a toreador) – Herbert Clayton
- Mr. Probitt (a solicitor) – A. Hatherton
- Moreno (Carajola's friend) – Sidney Bracy
- Waiter – Frank Greene
- Sammy Gigg (a tiger) – Edmund Payne
- Dora Selby (a Ward in Chancery) – Marie Studholme (later replaced by Adrienne Augarde)
- Susan (proprietress of the Magazin des Fleurs, Grand Hotel, Biarritz) – Violet Lloyd
- Mrs. Malton Hoppings (a widow) (a.k.a. Amelia) – Connie Ediss
- Doña Teresa – Queenie Leighton
- La Belle Bolero – Maidie Hope
- Cora Bellamy (a bridesmaid) – Gertie Millar
- Ethel Marshall – Maie Saqui
- Isabella – Sybil Arundale
- Inez – Kitty Mason
- Nancy Staunton (friend of Dora) – Florence Collingbourne

== Musical numbers ==
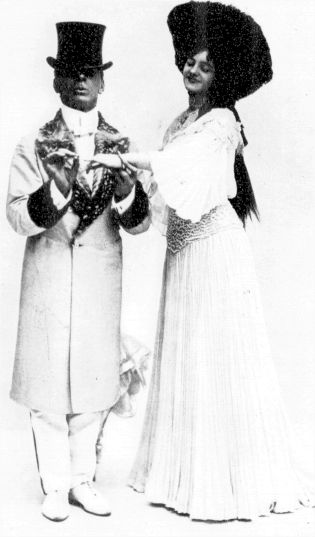
Fred. Wright, Jr. and Gertie Millar

ACT I – Interior of Susan's Flower Shop, Biarritz, France

- No. 1 – Opening Chorus – "Where the gigantic ocean Atlantic breaks in a beautiful bay..."
- No. 2 – Chorus of Bridesmaids – "We're all of us lovely and young, so draw no distinction between us..."
- No. 3 – Song – Mrs. Hoppings & Chorus – "I have always had a passion for a man of rank and fashion..."
- No. 4 – Song – Carajolo & Chorus – "I'm the glory and pride of the land of Spain..."
- No. 5 – Quartet – Dora, Nancy, Mr. Probitt, & Porter – "Oh, a journey by train is a terrible strain..."
- No. 6 – Trio – Dora, Nancy, & Susan – "We're dear little girls, you know, and dear little lives we've led..."
- No. 7 – Song – Archie – "I'm an awf'lly simple fellow as I'm sure you'll all agree..."
- No. 8 – Duet – Susan & Gigg – "If ever I marry, my husband must be in some occupation attractive to me..."
- No. 9 – Song – Pettifer & Chorus – "Whenever you're my way, quite close to Ratcliffe Highway..."
- No. 10 – Duet – Dora & Nancy (with Kate) – "Now I have married you, Sir! – Now I have married you, Madam! ..."
- No. 11 – Quartet – Dora, Nancy, Gus, & Archie – "Away to España, today or manaña..."
- No. 12 – Song – Nancy & Chorus – "If you want to know your passion in a floral kind of fashion..."
- No. 13 – Scena – Teresa & Gigg – "Oh, Señor, pray be bold of heart, do not delay, but make a start..."
- No. 14 – Finale Act I – "Hear me, Amelia! When you saw me lately, appearances might seem against me greatly..."

ACT II – Market Square, Villaya

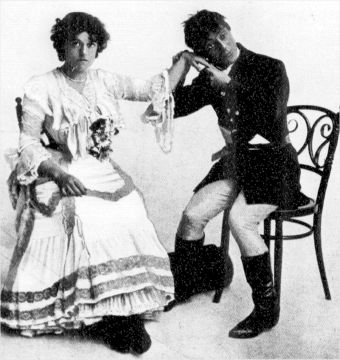
Violet Lloyd and Edmund Payne

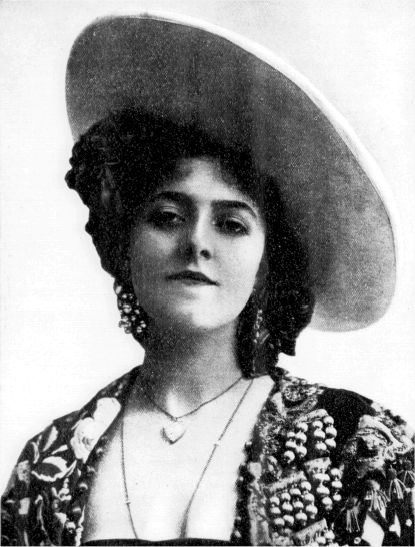
Queenie Leighton as Teresa

- No. 15 – Opening Chorus – "With all the town in bright array upon this most auspicious day..."
- No. 16 – Song – Governor & Chorus – "We are that person glorious – the Governor, the Governor..."
- No. 17 – Trio – Gus, Archie, & Gigg – "Oh, memory's a funny thing indeed, it's often very feeble and uncertain..."
- No. 18 – Song – Pettifer & Chorus – "Oh, when I marry my blushing bride, it will cost a monarch's ransom..."
- No. 19 – Song – Nancy & Chorus – "Oh, I'm a little maid who's not at all afraid of what my friends may think or say..."
- No. 20 – Song – La Belle Bolero & Chorus – "Hark to the sound of multitudes assembling, keen with excitement..."
- No. 21 – Duet – Susan & Gigg – "You all know me, I'm Mr. Punch, you see; observe the funny hump upon my back..."
- No. 22 – Song – Cora & Bridesmaids – "When the children go to play in summer time, they will frolic all the day..."
- No. 23 – Grand Chorus and March – "Here they come in glittering glory, bound to battle grim and gory..."
- No. 24 – Song – Sir Archie & Chorus – "Sir Archie was a subaltern who sallied to the south..."
- No. 25 – Finale Act II – "When I'm a little wife, I'll have some fun in life..."

Addenda

- No. 26 – Song – Mrs. Hoppings & Chorus – "Maidie's just the 'cutest thing that I have ever met..."
- No. 27 – Song – Cora – "I love to see young people good, it's really so amusing..."
- No. 28 – Duet – Cora & Dora – "At a wedding that is smart, if you want to lose your heart keep an eye on Cora..."
- No. 29 – Song – Mrs. Hopping – "Never thought I'd live to see such a time as this is..."
- No. 30 – Duet – Archie & Gigg – "When extremities encounter there is sure to be some fun..."
