= Alfred Murray =

Australian cricketer (1868 – 1936)

Personal information
- Full name: Alfred Wynyatt Murray
- Born: 4 February 1868; Long Gully, Victoria, Australia
- Died: 27 July 1936 (aged 68); Preston, Victoria, Australia

Domestic team information
- Years: Team
- 1897–1901: Victoria
- Source: Cricinfo, 27 July 2015

Alfred Murray (4 February 1868 – 27 July 1936) was an Australian cricketer. He played five first-class cricket matches for Victoria between 1897 and 1901.

Murray began his cricket career in Bendigo playing for the Bendigo United Cricket Club but later moved to Melbourne where he played for East Melbourne in district cricket. He was primarily a batsman but also bowled "googly" spin. He was selected to represent Victoria and highlights of his state career included a 187 run partnership with Peter McAlister against New Zealand in 1899 and scoring a century against Tasmania in 1900.

In his professional career, Murray worked for the Victorian Railways Department. He became chief clerk of the Railways Workshops in Bendigo before retiring in 1928.

In his personal life he had a daughter and three sons.

== See also ==
- List of Victoria first-class cricketers
