= The Messenger Boy =

Musical comedy by James T. Tanner and Alfred Murray

- Programme from Plymouth tryout
- Music: Ivan Caryll and Lionel Monckton
- Lyrics: Adrian Ross and Percy Greenbank
- Book: James T. Tanner and Alfred Murray
- Productions: 1900 West End; 1901 Broadway

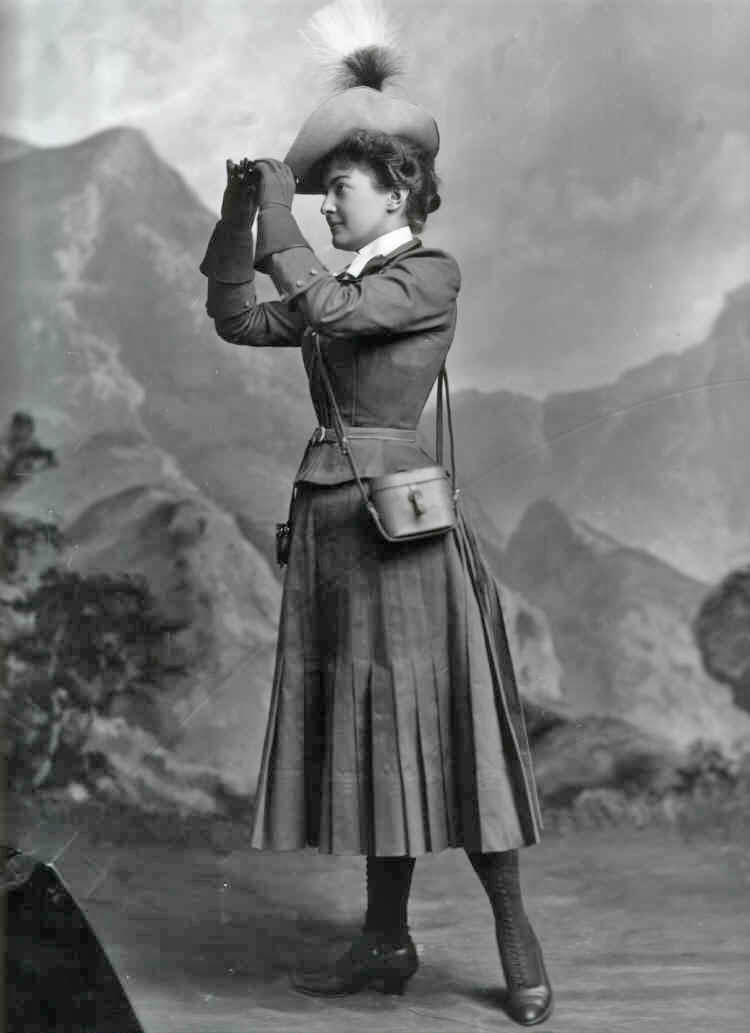
Grace Palotta as Daisy

The Messenger Boy is a musical comedy in two acts by James T. Tanner and Alfred Murray, lyrics by Adrian Ross and Percy Greenbank, with music by Ivan Caryll and Lionel Monckton, with additional numbers by Paul Rubens. The story concerns a rascally financier who tries to discredit a rival in love; it takes place in London, Cairo and Paris.

After a tryout in Plymouth, the musical opened at the Gaiety Theatre in London, managed by George Edwardes, on 3 February 1900 and ran for a very successful 429 performances. Harry Grattan and Edmund Payne starred, and Marie Studholme later joined the cast. It had a Broadway run of 128 performances, at Daly's Theatre, from 16 September 1901 to 4 January 1902. The director there was Herbert Gresham, and the musical director was Louis F. Gottschalk. The cast included Georgia Caine as Nora, Jobyna Howland as Lord Punchestown, May Robson as Mrs. Bang and Flora Zabelle as Isabel Blyth.

Rosie Boote, who played Isabel in the London cast, so charmed Geoffrey Taylour, 4th Marquess of Headfort, that he married her in 1901. She outlived her husband, dying in 1958. The young ladies appearing in George Edwardes's shows became so popular that wealthy gentlemen, termed "Stage Door Johnnies", would wait outside the stage door hoping to escort them to dinner. In some cases, as here, a marriage resulted.

== Roles and original cast ==
- Hooker Pasha (Commissioner of the Nile) – Harry Nicholls
- Cosmos Bey (Agent to Hooker Pasha) – E. J. Lonnen
- Clive Radnor (a Queen's Messenger) – L. Mackinder
- Captain Pott (of the "S.S. Shark") – Fred. Wright, Jun.
- Professor Phunckwitz (a German Egyptologist) – Willie Warde
- Comte Le Fleury – Robert Nainby
- Mr. Tudor Pyke (a Financier) – John Tresahar
- Lord Punchestown (Governor of El Barra) – William Wyes
- Captain Naylor (of the P. and O. "S.S. Sirdar") – Harry Grattan
- Mr. Gascoigne (an Amateur Journalist) – A. Hatherton
- Purser – J. Thompson
- Mr. Trotter – F. Standen
- Tommy Bang (a District Messenger) – Edmund Payne
- Nora (Lady Punchestown's Step-Daughter) – Violet Lloyd (later replaced by Marie Studholme)
- Daisy Dapple (a Lady Journalist) – Grace Palotta
- Mrs. Bang (Tommy's Mother) – Connie Ediss
- Lady Punchestown (a Leader of London Society) – Maud Hobson
- Isabel Blyth – Rosie Boote
- Lady Winifred – Margaret Fraser
- Cecilia Gower – Maie Saqui
- Rosa (Lady Punchestown's Maid) – Katie Seymour

Source: Gilbert and Sullivan Archive

== Musical numbers ==
Postcard advertising the show

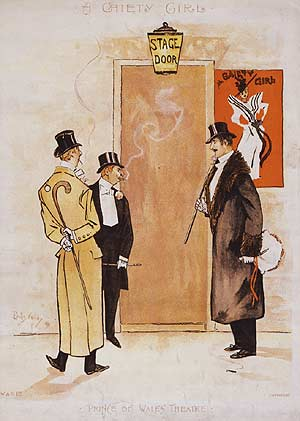
Stage Door Johnnies wait outside a musical comedy for their favourite Gaiety Girl.

Act I - Scene 1 - Hôtel de Luxe, Thames Embankment

- No. 1 - Chorus - "To our Charity Bazaar, Come buy! buy! buy!"
- No. 2 - Cosmos & Chorus - "If there's anybody pining for a reputation shining"
- No. 3 - Lady Punchestown & Pyke - "Supposing a sweet little maid, well-bred, rather clever and fair"
- No. 4 - Nora & Chorus - "Oh, I'm very much afraid there's a lot of scandal made"
- No. 5 - Nora & Clive - "Oh, my dearest, ere I go, there's one thing I want to know"
- No. 6 - Cosmos, Daisy, Gascoigne, Le Fleury, & Phunckwitz - "If you want to go by a proper P. & O."
- No. 7 - Tommy & Chorus - "I am a smart little sort of a chap, very obliging and active"
- No. 8 - Rosa & Tommy - "I'm a little messenger, summon'd by a call"

Act I - Scene 2 - Brindisi

- No. 9 - Chorus - "Tarentella" - "Tra la la la la la la la"
- No. 10 - Clive & Chorus - "I met a Miss Mary Maclean on the boat, alone and in charge of the skipper"
- No. 11 - Captain Naylor, Captain Pott, & Cosmos - "I will bet the crowd a dinner that I get to Egypt first!"
- No. 12 - Mrs. Bang & Chorus - "You talk about detectives in a story, that guess whatever people say or do"
- No. 13 - Concerted Piece - "Oh, Captain, we're sure you can tell us a lot, we want your advice if you please"
- No. 14 - Finale Act I - "Cast the moorings free, warp the vessels round"

Act II - Scene 1 - Cairo; Scene 2 - Up the Nile; Scene 3 - El Barra

- No. 15 - Chorus - "Sheltered from the noon-day glare, civilized society gazes on the passers by"
- No. 16 - Hooker Pasha & Chorus - "My name it is Hooker Pasha, no family tree can I muster"
- No. 17 - Clive, Daisy, Gascoigne, Phunckwitz & Le Fleury - "Now this trip you should take"
- No. 18 - Isabel & Chorus - "There's a girl you may have met, if you have you won't forget; she is Maisie"
- No. 19 - Dervish Dance
- No. 20 - Song and Dance - Rosa - "Oh, when de moon am rising"
- No. 21 - Lady Punchestown, Pyke, Mrs. Bang, & Hooker - "Now how shall we try to stop this lad?"
- No. 22 - Captain Pott & Chorus - "I'm famous Captain Pott"
- No. 23 - Chorus - "Let the trumpets and the drums, as they blare and roll and rattle, greet the Governor that comes"
- No. 24 - Rosa & Tommy - "Oh, if you please, I'm Rameses"
- No. 25 - Nora & Chorus - "The boys go marching down the street, with a tramp, tramp, tramp"
- No. 26 - Mrs. Bang & Chorus - "Although I'm British born, I do not look with scorn on foreigners as such"
- No. 27 - Finale Act II, with Nora & Clive - "We will take our wedding trip upon the Nile"
