= George Edwardes =

English theatre manager and producer (1855–1915)

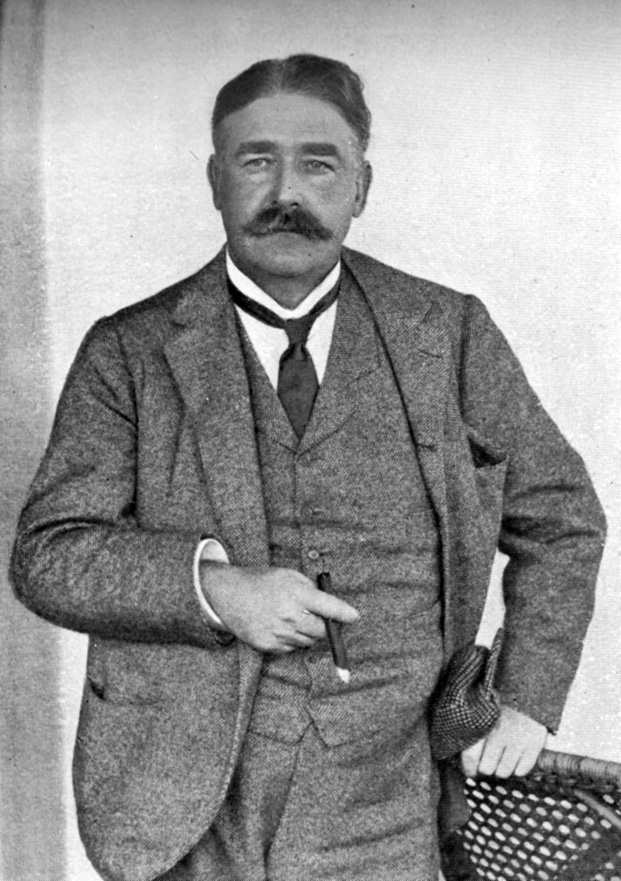
George Edwardes

George Joseph Edwardes (né Edwards; 8 October 1855 – 4 October 1915) was an English theatre manager and producer of Irish ancestry who brought a new era in musical theatre to the British stage and beyond.

Edwardes started out in theatre management, soon working at a number of West End theatres. By the age of 20, he was managing theatres for Richard D'Oyly Carte. In 1885, Edwardes became a manager at the Gaiety Theatre with John Hollingshead, who soon retired.

For the next three decades, Edwardes ruled a theatrical empire including the Gaiety, Daly's Theatre, the Adelphi Theatre and others, and sent touring companies around Britain and abroad. In the early 1890s, Edwardes recognised the changing tastes of musical theatre audiences and led the movement away from burlesque and comic opera to Edwardian musical comedy.

== Life and career ==
Edwardes was born at Great Grimsby, Lincolnshire, England. He was the eldest of four sons and three daughters of James Edwards, comptroller of customs, and his wife, Eleanor Widdup. Edwardes's parents were Roman Catholics from Wexford, Ireland. He attended St James's College, in Clee, after which he was sent to London to take the examination for the Royal Military Academy. He did not enter the Academy, however, because his cousins, Irish theatre managers John and Michael Gunn, obtained a job for him at Leicester's Royal Opera House.

=== Early career ===
Michael Gunn met Richard D'Oyly Carte in 1875 and later became a partner in his production company. He and young Edwardes moved to London to work for Carte at the Opera Comique in the mid-1870s, with Edwardes being given the trusted position of treasurer. He eventually became Carte's manager at the Opera Comique and then was Carte's first managing director of the Savoy Theatre in 1881, helping to produce several of the famous Gilbert and Sullivan comic operas until 1885. During this time, he added the "e" to his surname. While working at the Opera Comique, Edwardes met his future wife, the singer Julia Gwynne, who was appearing with the D'Oyly Carte Opera Company, where she was playing small principal roles. The couple married in 1885 and produced three daughters, including one named Dorothy, and a son, D'Arcy.

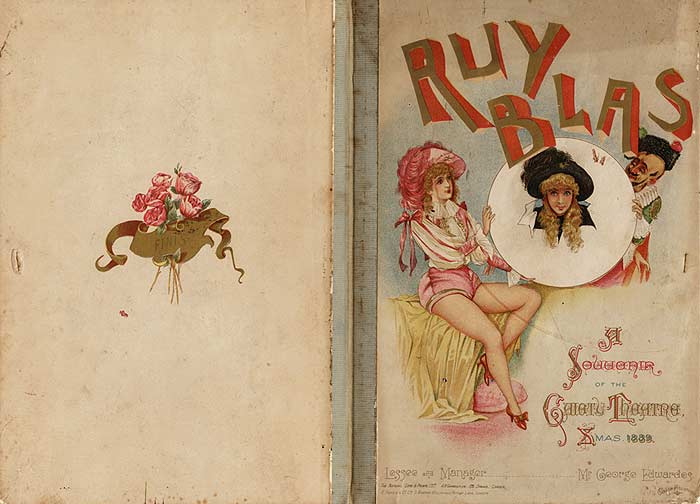
Souvenir programme from Ruy Blas and the Blasé Roué

In 1885, Edwardes was hired to succeed John Hollingshead as manager at the Gaiety Theatre, producing the burlesques in which the Gaiety specialised. Together, they produced Little Jack Sheppard a burlesque in a full-length format with an original score by Meyer Lutz, which opened at Christmas 1885. After this, in 1886, Hollingshead retired, and from then on the Guv'nor (as Edwardes came to be known) was in charge, with the assistance of the theatre's star player, Nellie Farren.

The next show that Edwardes produced at the Gaiety was Dorothy (1886), a comic opera similar to the Gilbert and Sullivan operas that he had produced for Carte, but the Gaiety's audiences were used to burlesques, and so Edwardes sold the rights to Dorothy, which became a hit at another theatre. Following on the success of Little Jack Sheppard, Edwardes turned the Gaiety back to producing burlesques, but these were "new burlesques": full-length pieces with original music by Meyer Lutz, instead of scores compiled from popular tunes. These included Monte Cristo, Junior (1887), Miss Esmeralda (1887), Frankenstein, or The Vampire's Victim (1887), Faust up to Date (1888), Ruy Blas and the Blasé Roué (1889), Carmen up to Data (1890), Cinder Ellen up too Late (1891), and Don Juan (1892, with music by Meyer Lutz, book by Fred Leslie and lyrics by Adrian Ross). John D'Auban choreographed the Gaiety burlesques until 1891. These new burlesques were very successful and toured widely in Britain and abroad. However, Dorothy's runaway success (it became the longest-running piece in musical theatre history up to that time) showed Edwardes and other producers that topical, light comedies could be enormously successful. At the same time, the death of Fred Leslie and retirement of Nellie Farren by 1892 helped bring to an end the era of Gaiety burlesque.

Edwardes produced shows at other theatres as well. For instance, in 1892, he took over the Prince of Wales Theatre. In addition, after Gilbert and Sullivan stopped working together exclusively in the 1890s, Edwardes produced Gilbert's His Excellency at the Lyric Theatre in 1894. He also became manager of the struggling Empire Theatre, London, and transformed it into a music hall before it became associated with several successful ballets under the composer-director Leopold Wenzel.

=== Popularising musical comedy ===
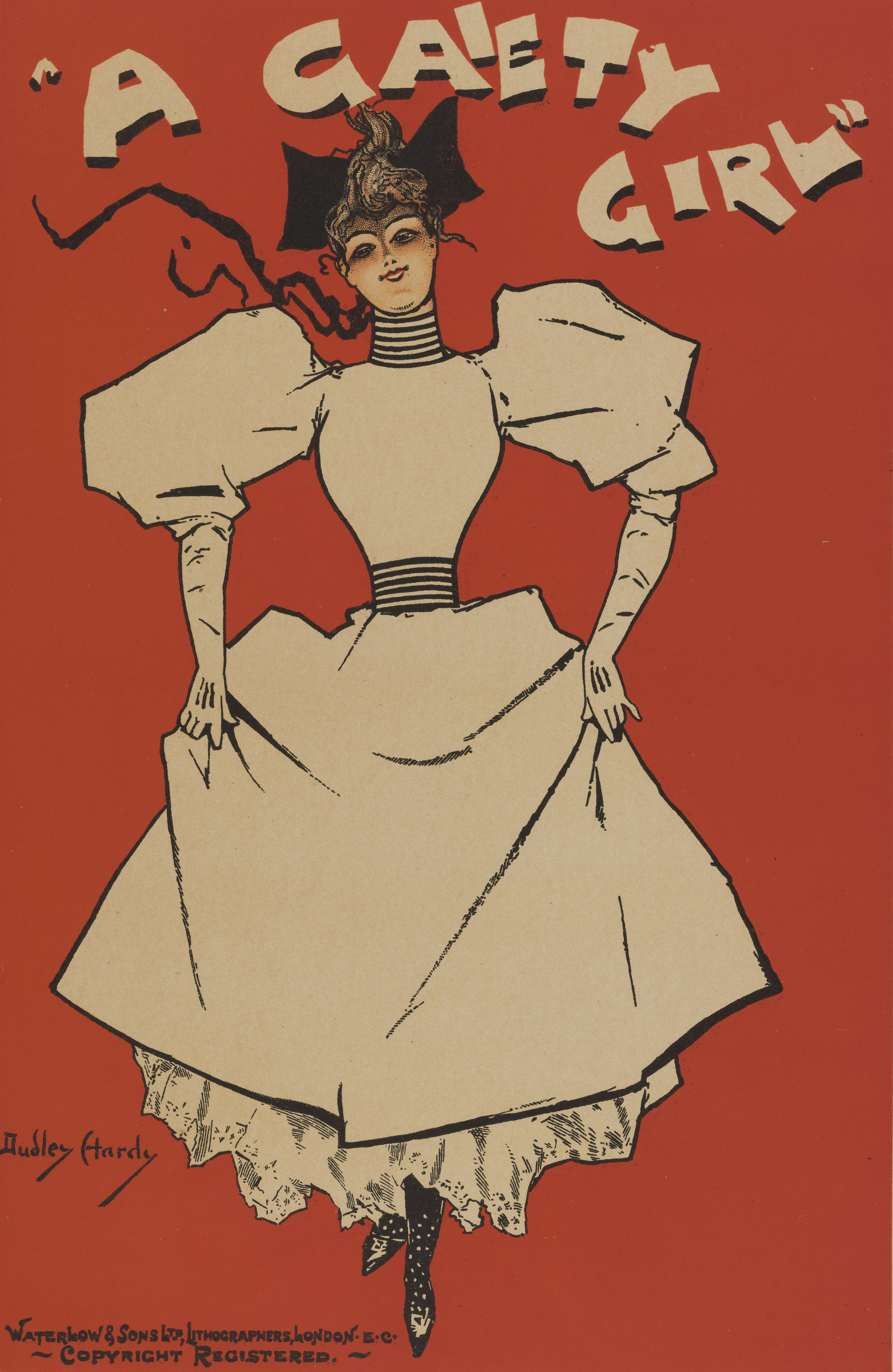
Poster for A Gaiety Girl

In the 1890s, Edwardes hit upon a new strategy for the Gaiety, which was a variation from the kinds of shows that he and Carte had produced and also had elements of the Gaiety burlesques and of music hall entertainments. The earliest of these shows, taking a cue from Dorothy, had a musical style similar to the Gilbert and Sullivan comic operas. Into this mix, he incorporated some of the elements of the form that Harrigan & Hart had established on Broadway a decade earlier. Like Thomas German Reed and W. S. Gilbert before him, Edwardes wanted to produce musical plays that were more respectable (and would attract a more affluent, polite crowd) than risqué burlesque. But Edwardes sought pieces that integrated spoken dialogue and music in a lighter, less satiric way than Gilbert and Sullivan had, using topical songs, fashionable costumes and sassy byplay between the characters.

The first of these, In Town in 1892 and A Gaiety Girl in 1893 (both of which were produced by Edwardes at the Prince of Wales Theatre), met with strong success and confirmed Edwardes on the path he was taking. Edwardes dubbed his new musical plays "musical comedies". If Edwardes didn't invent the genre, he popularised it in Britain and was the first producer to elevate them to international popularity. He used the best writers and composers to create entertainments appealing to his Victorian and Edwardian audiences. Although he never acted in his productions, Edwardes controlled every other aspect of them.

==== The Gaiety Theatre ====
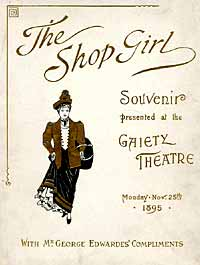
Souvenir – 1st anniversary performance of The Shop Girl

At the Gaiety Theatre, Edwardes hired Ivan Caryll as the resident composer and music director and created a series of shows featuring fashionable characters and costumes, tuneful music, romantic and topical lyrics and pretty dancing. He embedded these elements in an often tenuous but nonetheless continuous original narrative. Like burlesque, Edwardes's "girl" musicals featured chorus lines and other devices for the display of women's bodies, but within the context of the simple narrative, elaborate displays of contemporary fashion and scenery, and light parody of social convention and topical issues.

For the next two decades, the "girl" musicals, with popular songs by Lionel Monckton and lively, wise-crack filled books by Owen Hall, filled the Gaiety Theatre, including The Shop Girl (1894), The Circus Girl (1896), A Runaway Girl (1898), The Orchid (1903), The Spring Chicken (1905), The Girls of Gottenberg (1907), Our Miss Gibbs (1909), The Sunshine Girl (1912), and After the Girl (1914). The heroines were independent young women who often earned their own livings. The stories followed a familiar plot line – a chorus girl breaks into high society, a shop girl makes a good marriage. There was always a misunderstanding during act one and an engagement at the end. In the words of a contemporary review, Edwardes’s musicals were "Light, Bright and enjoyable." These musicals were widely imitated by other British producers, and, within a decade, in America.

Perhaps to balance the "girl" musicals, the Gaiety also presented a series of what could be described as "boy" musicals, such as The Messenger Boy (1900), The Toreador (1901), The New Aladdin (1906), and Theodore and Co. (1916)

==== The Gaiety Girls and high fashion ====
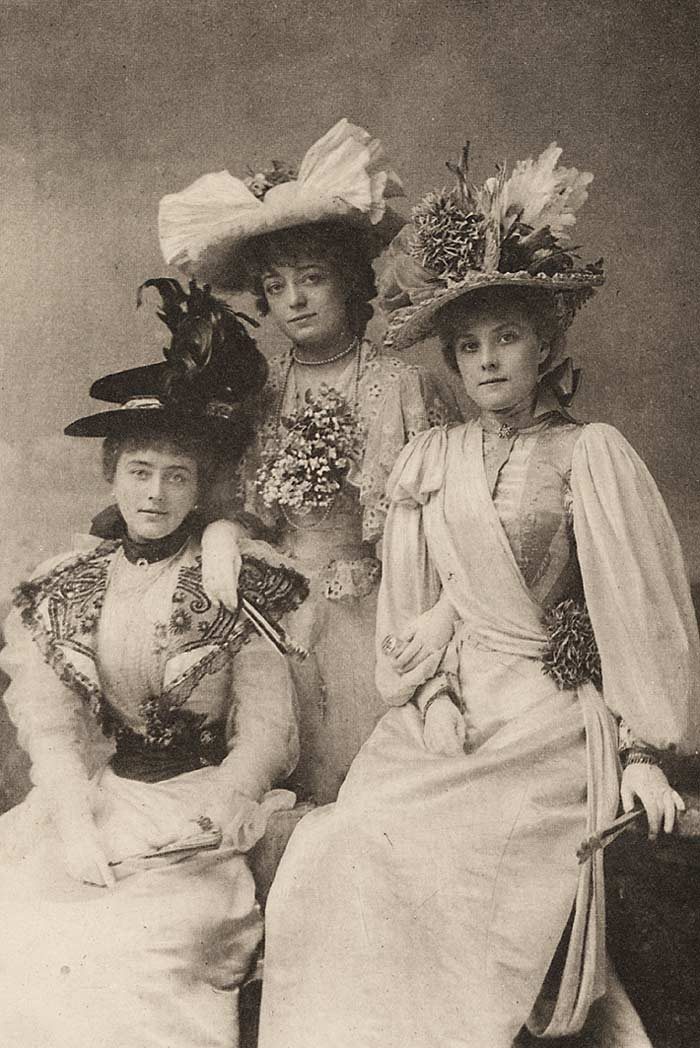
Gaiety Girls, c. 1890

A major attraction of Edwardes's shows was his glamorous, dancing corps of "Gaiety Girls". These were fashionable, elegant young ladies, unlike the corseted actresses from the earlier burlesques. In Edwardes's shows, these ladies were, as The Sketch noted in its review of The Geisha in 1896, "clothed in accordance with the very latest and most extreme modes of the moment." Many of the best-known London couturiers designed costumes for Edwardes's productions. The illustrated periodicals were eager to publish photographs of actresses in the latest stage hits, and so the theatre became an excellent way for clothiers to publicise their latest fashions.

Gaiety girls were polite, well-behaved young women and became a popular attraction and a symbol of ideal womanhood. They were much sought after by the "stage door johnnies" of the 1890s—some of them becoming popular actresses or marrying into society and even the nobility. For example, in 1907, Denise Orme married Lord Churston and she later married the Duke of Leinster. Alan Hyman wrote in The Gaiety Years,

At the old Gaiety in the Strand the chorus was becoming a matrimonial agency for girls with ambitions to marry into the peerage and began in the nineties when Connie Gilchrist, a star of the Old Gaiety, married the Earl of Orkney and then in 1901, the Marquess of Headfort married Rosie Boote, who had charmed London the previous year when she sang Maisie in The Messenger Boy. After Connie Gilchrist and Rosie Boote had started the fashion a score of the Guv'nor's budding stars left him to marry peers or men of title while other Gaiety Girls settled for a banker or a stockbroker. The Guv'nor finding this was playing ducks and drakes with his theatrical plans had a 'nuptial clause' inserted in every contract... Debutantes were competing with the other girls to get into the Gaiety chorus while upper-class youths were joining the ranks of the chorus boys.

==== Other theatres and later years ====
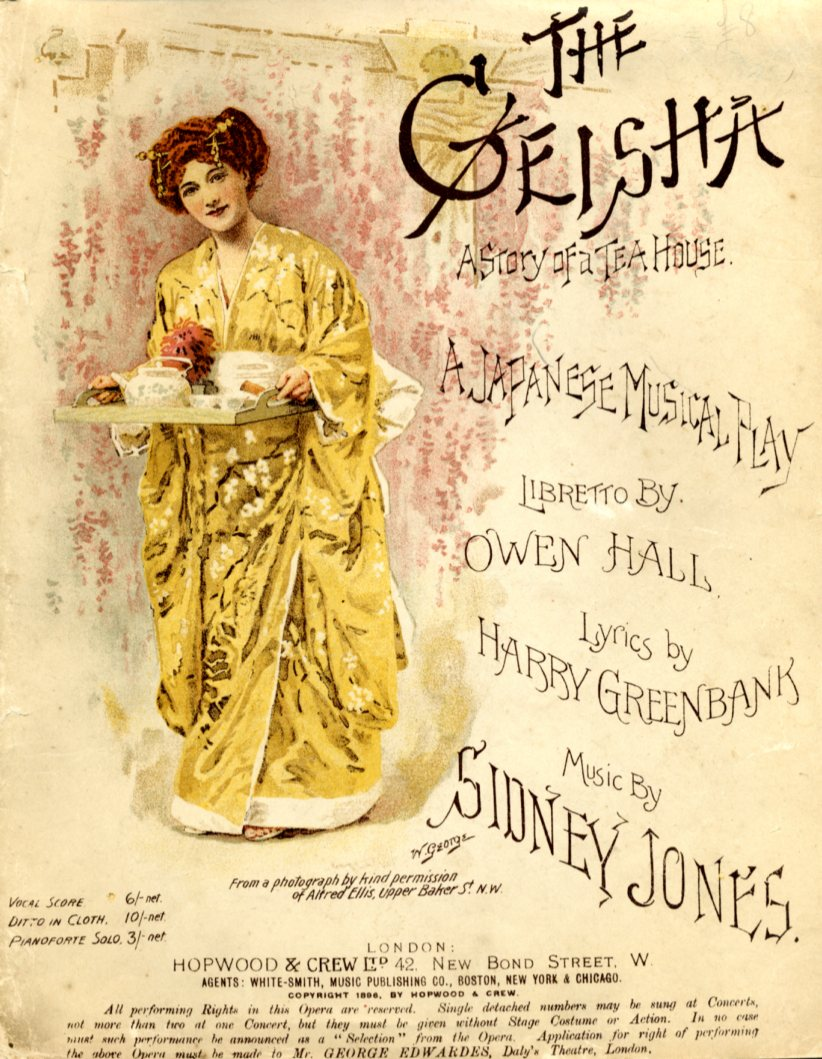
Cover of the Vocal Score

Edwardes joined with American producer Augustin Daly to build a new London theatre that they would share. Daly's Theatre opened in 1893, but Daly did not produce many works. In 1895, Edwardes took over the management of the theatre, where Sidney Jones was hired as the resident composer and music director. Edwardes's shows at Daly's had more coherent plots and more romantic music specifically composed for the plot of the piece, rather than a collection of topical popular songs. They were more like what musical comedy was to become at maturity than their Gaiety Theatre siblings, the more review-like "Girl" musicals. These shows included hits like An Artist's Model (1895), The Geisha (1896), A Greek Slave (1898), and San Toy (1899). The stars at Daly's included strong, romantic singers: baritone Hayden Coffin and soprano Marie Tempest. They were joined by soubrette dancer Letty Lind and comic Huntley Wright. After a falling out with Coffin, Edwardes found success at Daly's with a series of English-language adaptations of European operettas, including Les p'tites Michu (1905), The Merry Widow (1907), The Dollar Princess (1910), The Count of Luxemburg (1911) and The Marriage Market (1913). He produced The Girl in the Train at the Vaudeville Theatre in 1909.

Edwardes in 1903

Edwardes also used the Apollo Theatre for several musicals, including Three Little Maids (1902) and The Girl from Kays (1902). As Edwardes's success grew, he needed another theatre and added the Adelphi Theatre to his chain of musical houses. There he produced a series of musicals by Lionel Monckton, Percy Greenbank and Adrian Ross, including The Earl and the Girl (1903), The Quaker Girl (1910), The Dancing Mistress (1912), and The Girl from Utah (1913). At the Lyric Theatre, in 1903, he produced Caryll's comic opera The Duchess of Dantzic. He also managed the Empire Theatre of Varieties, among other theatres. Edwardes was a founder member of the Society of West End Theatre Managers, along with Frank Curzon, Helen Carte, Arthur Bourchier and sixteen others.

Edwardes raced horses, and one of this thoroughbreds, Santoi, won many prizes including the Ascot Gold Cup in 1901. He also bred horses in County Tipperary. When World War I broke out, Edwardes was making his annual visit to a German spa. He was imprisoned in Germany for several months, which exacerbated his health problems.

== Death ==
Edwardes died at his home in Regent's Park, London, just before his 60th birthday. He was buried at St Mary's Cemetery, Kensal Green, and was survived by his wife, Julia Gwynne. Although Edwardes left valuable properties, he also left considerable debts. His theatrical enterprises continued to operate under the guidance of Robert Evett, who managed to produce a number of hits over the next few years, notably The Maid of the Mountains and The Boy, both beginning in 1917, that paid the debts of the estate.

== Sources ==
- Ainger, Michael (2002). Gilbert and Sullivan – A Dual Biography. Oxford: Oxford University Press. ISBN 0-19-514769-3.
- Barrington, Rutland (1908). Rutland Barrington: A Record of 35 Years' Experience on the English Stage, By Himself. London. discussing Edwardes's racehorses
