= Edwardian musical comedy =

Form of British musical theatre

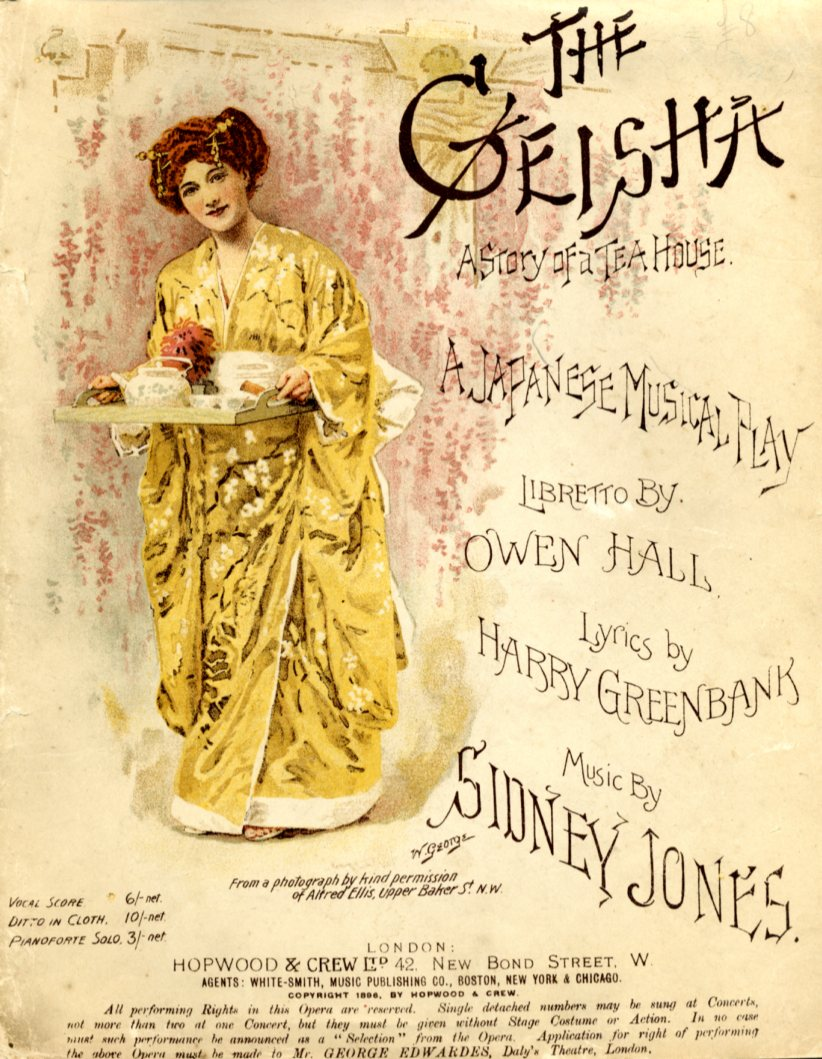
The Geisha was a popular Edwardian musical comedy

Edwardian musical comedy is a genre of British musical theatre that thrived from 1892 into the 1920s, extending beyond the reign of King Edward VII in both directions. It began to dominate the English musical stage, and even the American musical theatre, when the Gilbert and Sullivan operas' dominance had ended, until the rise of American musicals by Jerome Kern, Rodgers and Hart, George Gershwin and Cole Porter following the First World War.

Between In Town in 1892 and The Maid of the Mountains, premiering in 1917, this new style of musical theatre proliferated across the musical stages of Britain and the rest of the English-speaking world. The popularity of In Town and A Gaiety Girl (1893), led to an astonishing number of hits over the next three decades, into the 1920s, the most successful of which included The Shop Girl (1894), The Geisha (1896), Florodora (1899), A Chinese Honeymoon (1901), The Earl and the Girl (1903), The Arcadians (1909), Our Miss Gibbs (1909), The Quaker Girl (1910), Betty (1914), Chu Chin Chow (1916) and The Maid of the Mountains (1917).

== History ==
Edwardian musical comedy began in the last decade of the Victorian era and captured the optimism, energy and good humour of the new century and the Edwardian era, as well as providing comfort to audiences seeking light entertainment during the First World War. The Gaiety Theatre's well-loved but racy burlesques were coming to the end of their popularity, and so was the phenomenally successful series of family-friendly Gilbert and Sullivan operas. These two genres had dominated the musical stage in English-speaking countries since the 1870s. A few lighter, more romantic comic operas, beginning with Dorothy (1886) found success and showed that audiences wanted something lighter than operetta, but more coherent in construction than burlesque, that featured humour, romance and modern fashions and culture of the day that would attract both a male and female audience.

=== George Edwardes ===
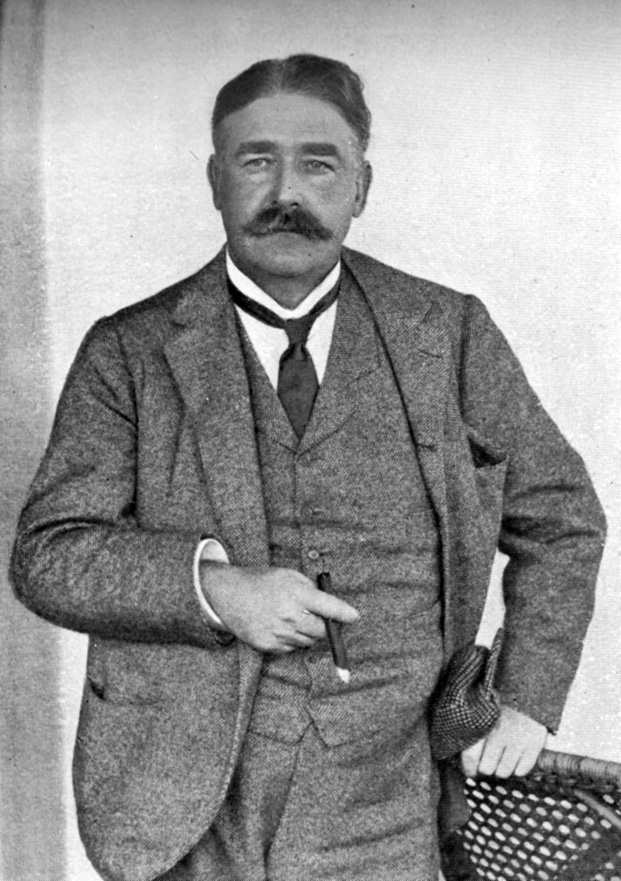
George Edwardes

The father of the Edwardian musical was George "The Guv'nor" Edwardes. He took over London's Gaiety Theatre in the 1880s and, at first, improved the quality of the Gaiety Theatre's earlier burlesques. Perceiving that their time had passed, he experimented with a modern-dress, family-friendly musical theatre style, with breezy, popular songs, snappy, romantic banter, and stylish spectacle. These drew on the traditions of Savoy opera and also used elements of burlesque and of Americans Harrigan and Hart. Their plots were simple, and they included elaborate displays of contemporary fashion and settings, and lighthearted parody of modern social convention and topical issues. He replaced the bawdy women of burlesque with his "respectable" corps of dancing, singing Gaiety Girls who wore the latest fashions, and also showed off their bodies in chorus lines and bathing attire, as well as singing, to complete the musical and visual fun. These shows were immediately widely copied at other London theatres and then in America.

The first Edwardian musical comedy was In Town in 1892. Its success, together with the even greater sensation of A Gaiety Girl in 1893, confirmed Edwardes on the path he was taking. These "musical comedies", as he called them, revolutionized the London stage and set the tone for the next three decades. According to musical theatre writer Andrew Lamb, "The British Empire and America began to fall for the appeal of the [Edwardian] musical comedy from the time when A Gaiety Girl was taken on a world tour in 1894."

Edwardes' early Gaiety hits included a series of light, romantic "poor maiden loves aristocrat and wins him against all odds" shows, usually with the word "Girl" in the title. After A Gaiety Girl came The Shop Girl (1894), The Circus Girl (1896) and A Runaway Girl (1898) and eleven other "girl" musicals followed. The heroines were independent young women who often earned their own livings. The stories followed a familiar plot line – a chorus girl breaks into high society or a shop girl makes a good marriage to a wealthy aristocrat (who is often in disguise). There was always a misunderstanding during act one and an engagement at the end. In the words of a contemporary review, Edwardes' musicals were "Light, bright and enjoyable." Later Gaiety Theatre "girl" musicals included The Orchid (1903), The Spring Chicken (1905), The Girls of Gottenberg (1907), Our Miss Gibbs (1909), The Sunshine Girl (1912) and The Girl on the Film (1913). Perhaps to balance the "girl" musicals, the Gaiety also presented a series of what could be described as "boy" musicals, such as The Messenger Boy (1900), The Toreador (1901), The New Aladdin (1906) and Theodore and Co. (1916). Edwardes expanded his empire to other theatres and presented slightly more complex comedy hits beginning with An Artist's Model (1895). The Geisha (1896) and San Toy (1899) each ran for more than two years and found great international success, capitalizing on the British craze for all things oriental. Other Edwardes hits included The Girl from Kays (1902), The Earl and the Girl (1903) and The Quaker Girl (1910).

=== Composers, writers, producers and stars ===
Phyllis Dare in The Arcadians

The chief glories of Edwardian musical comedies lie in their musical scores. At their best, these combined the delicacy and sophistication of operetta with the robust tunefulness of the music hall. The major composers of the genre were Sidney Jones (The Geisha), Ivan Caryll (Our Miss Gibbs), Lionel Monckton (The Quaker Girl), Howard Talbot (A Chinese Honeymoon), Leslie Stuart (Florodora) and Paul Rubens (Miss Hook of Holland). Scores were constantly refreshed with "additional" or "specialty" numbers and re-arranged, often by several different composers and lyricists, to keep audiences coming back. Important writers included Adrian Ross, Harry Greenbank, Percy Greenbank, Owen Hall, Charles H. Taylor and Oscar Asche. Generally, the book, lyrics and music were each written by different people, which was a first for the musical stage, although now this is the usual way of doing things. Adrian Ross wrote the lyrics for well over 50 Edwardian musicals.

Besides Edwardes, American producer Charles Frohman and actor-managers like Seymour Hicks, Robert Evett and George Grossmith, Jr. were responsible for many of these shows. The musicals were frequently built around a resident company of artists, and the greatest stars of the era included actresses Marie Tempest, Gertie Millar, Lily Elsie, Ellaline Terriss and Phyllis Dare, leading men such as Hayden Coffin and Harry Grattan, and comics such as Rutland Barrington, George Grossmith, Jr., Huntley Wright and Edmund Payne. One critic wrote of Joseph Coyne that, like other stars of musical comedy, "It is no good their pretending to be any one else. We go to see themselves, and all we ask is that the authors and others shall give them every chance of being themselves in the most pronounced and personal fashion".

=== Examples ===
The Arcadians is generally regarded as the masterpiece of the genre. The composers were Monckton and Talbot, both at the height of their powers. The story, about the havoc wreaked when truth-telling Arcadians arrive in corrupt London, neatly parallels the position of Edwardian musical comedies in theatrical history, with operetta-singing Arcadians, representing the past, meeting with music hall-singing Londoners, representing the future. This is an example of a common feature of shows of this period: sophistication with a common touch.

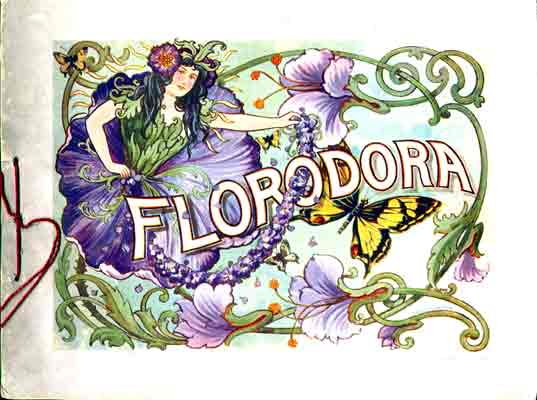
Souvenir program cover, 1900

Florodora (1899) by Leslie Stuart and Paul Rubens made a splash on both sides of the Atlantic, as did A Chinese Honeymoon (1901), by British lyricist George Dance and American-born composer Howard Talbot, which ran for a record setting 1,074 performances in London and 376 in New York. The story concerns couples who honeymoon in China and inadvertently break the kissing laws (shades of The Mikado). Later enormously popular hits included Chu Chin Chow (1916), which ran for 2,238 performances (more than twice as many as any previous musical), Theodore & Co (1916), The Boy (1917), Yes, Uncle! (1917) and The Maid of the Mountains (1917, the second longest-running Edwardian musical, with 1,352 performances). Audiences wanted light and uplifting entertainment during the war, and these shows delivered it.

George M. Cohan's sentimental Little Nellie Kelly (1922) was considered a late example of Edwardian musical comedy.

== Media ==
Music from Leslie Stuart and Owen Hall's Florodora (1899)
In the shade of the palm
Circa 1902 Edison Records recording by Frank C. Stanley

Tell me pretty maiden
Circa 1908 Edison Records recording by the "Edison Sextette" (Ada Jones, George S. Lenox, Corinne Morgan, Grace Nelson, Bob Roberts and Frank C. Stanley)
