= Cairns James =

British actor, dancer and educator (1865–1946)

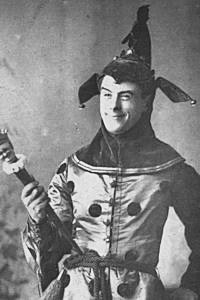
James as Jack Point in The Yeomen of the Guard (1890)

Lewis Cairns James (23 September 1865 – 7 October 1946) was a Scottish-born baritone, actor, educator and opera producer most prominent during the Victorian and Edwardian eras. From 1887 to 1891 he performed with a D'Oyly Carte Opera Company touring company performing the comic operas of Gilbert and Sullivan before embarking on a successful career on the West End stage and as a teacher of elocution.

== Early life ==
James was born in Edinburgh, Scotland, in 1865, the youngest of seven children of Mary Mattison née Smith (1827–1866) and the Reverend Alexander Thomas James (1826–1868), a Wesleyan minister. On the death of their father the younger children came under the guardianship of their uncle, the Reverend John Hutchison James, D.D. In June 1882 James matriculated at the University of London. While he was working as a young assistant master at Merthyr College in South Wales, the Principal recognised his theatrical talent and advised him to consider a career on the stage. He was given an introduction to W. S. Gilbert by 1887 and subsequently toured with the D'Oyly Carte Opera Company, beginning as the understudy to George Thorne in the starring patter baritone roles in the Gilbert and Sullivan comic operas.

== Early career ==
James may have been the "Louis James" who played Robin Oakapple in a D'Oyly Carte American Ruddigore company when it played in Toronto, Ontario, in May 1887. In a D'Oyly Carte touring company that played across the provinces in Britain between July 1887 and September 1891, he played Robin in Ruddigore (July 1887) and Ko-Ko in The Mikado (December 1887). He continued in those roles until June 1888. In January 1889 James first played Jack Point in The Yeomen of the Guard.

On 10 July 1889 at Hove, Sussex, he married the actress Jessie Moore, who was playing Elsie Maynard on the same tour and who was a sister of the performers Eva Moore and Decima Moore. James played Ko-Ko opposite his new wife as Yum-Yum in The Mikado from December 1889. During this run he got into trouble with the company’s management for adding "inappropriate, exaggerated and unauthorized 'business'" to the role and for refusing to follow the direction of the stage manager. James received a letter of admonishment from W. S. Gilbert, who wrote, "no actor will ever find his way into our London Company who defies any authority in this respect. I am the more sorry as Mr. Carte speaks in high terms of your and your wife's ability."

James never joined D'Oyly Carte's main company at the Savoy Theatre in London. When Gilbert and Richard D'Oyly Carte were discussing casting for the new opera The Gondoliers in 1889 Gilbert had suggested engaging Frank Thornton or James, who had been successful playing the principal comedy roles on tour. However, by 8 August 1889 Gilbert wrote that "If C. James is decided upon, I should need a special clause about gagging &c. – The first offence to be followed by instant dismissal." He continued to act with the touring company, playing Ko-Ko until March 1890, Point until April 1890 and from December 1890, and added the role of the Duke of Plaza-Toro in The Gondoliers from March 1890. James left the D’Oyly Carte organisation in September 1891.

== West End theatre ==
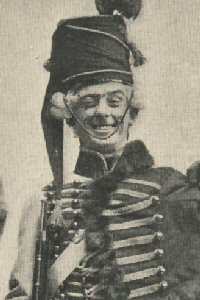
James in an unknown role

Between 1891 and 1902 he appeared in various roles in West End theatre, including at the Opera Comique, the Lyric Theatre, where he took over the role of Pietro from Lionel Brough in Gilbert and Cellier's comic opera The Mountebanks (1892), the Royalty Theatre, as Moustajon in Ma mie Rosette at the Globe Theatre (1892), the Prince of Wales Theatre, the Theatre Royal, Drury Lane, the Royal Strand Theatre, the Trafalgar Square Theatre (1893), where he also served as the assistant stage manager, Sir George Appleby in The Shop Girl (1893) and Adolphus Courtley in Leave It to Me (1895) at the Gaiety Theatre (1893), the Vaudeville Theatre, the Comedy Theatre, the Garrick Theatre, as Ascanio in L'Amour Mouillé at the Lyric Theatre (1899) and the Savoy Theatre, where he appeared as the Earl of Aycon in Naughty Nancy (1902). The critic of The Tatler wrote:

Although Naughty Nancy represents most things that Gilbert and Sullivanism abhorred it has brought back Mr. Cairns James to familiar ground, for he is an old Savoyard, and as such he has learnt the art of acting. Mr. James is not often seen in town in a musical piece, but he sings as well as he dances. He is married to Miss Jessie Moore, who will appear with her sister, Miss Eva Moore, in Mr. Edmond’s new play when it is put on at the Garrick.

James toured South Africa in 1894 under the management of the Wheeler Theatre Company, playing the lead roles for a theatrical company known as the Cairns James Company. D. C. Boonzaier claimed that this company was the first Gaiety Company to tour South Africa, opening a season of plays in the Good Hope Theatre on 9 June, 1894. James played Captain Arthur Coddington in In Town and went on to appear in Mam'zelle Nitouche, Miss Decima, and A Gaiety Girl.

James then toured of the United States, playing Governor Griffenfeld on Broadway in Gilbert and Carr's comic opera His Excellency (1895).

== Professor of elocution ==
From 1902 to 1916 James was Professor of Elocution at the Royal College of Music where his students included Martyn Green and Robertson Hare, at the Guildhall School of Music, and he was the Principal and co-founder of the School of Musical and Dramatic Art in London. In that capacity, in 1906 he wrote the introduction for The Golden Reciter: Prose and Verse for Reading and Recitation. James attributed his success as a teacher of elocution to the training he had received early in his career from Gilbert and Carte. Interviewed in Brisbane, Australia, in 1908 he said:

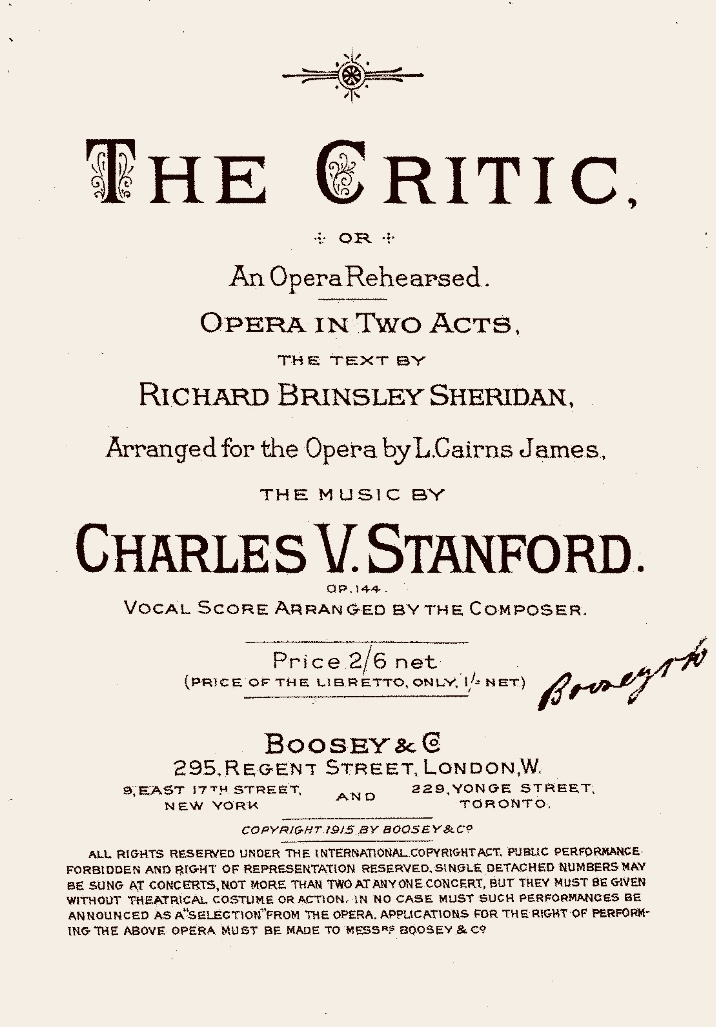
Score for The Critic, or An Opera Rehearsed (1916)

I owe every bit of success I have ever had to Sir William Gilbert and Mr. D'Oyly Carte. ... I could not possibly have had the benefit of better training for my present work than what I received in the old Savoy opera companies. There the first requisite demanded of every member of the company was clearness of enunciation. At the trials it was always understood that D'Oyly Carte was somewhere in the theatre. It was generally believed that he was hid away at the back row of the upper circle. He was extremely particular that every syllable of every word should be audible in the remotest corner of the house.

== Later years ==
James was initiated into No 2201 The Earl of Sussex Lodge in 1908. His wife Jessie died in 1910, and in 1911, aged 45, James married 22-year-old Catherine Mary Marshall. In 1913 as an "Elocution Teacher" he was admitted as a Freeman of the City of London. In January 1916 James returned to the London stage as a producer at the Shaftesbury Theatre. There he "arranged" the libretto for the opera The Critic, or An Opera Rehearsed (1916), an adaptation of Sheridan‘s comedy of the same name, set to a score by Charles Villiers Stanford. In May 1916 at the Aldwych Theatre he played Mr. Puff in Sheridan’s The Critic. From 1916 to 1919 James occasionally appeared at the Strand Theatre and the Criterion, and produced operatic works at the Aldwych Theatre, the Theatre Royal, Drury Lane, and the Royal Opera House in Covent Garden. His final known appearance in London was in Humperdinck's Hansel and Gretel at the Theatre Royal, Drury Lane from December 1922 to January 1923.

On retiring from the professional theatre James directed amateur operatic societies performing the Gilbert and Sullivan operas in Croydon during the 1920s and at Woolwich from 1938 to 1942.

Latterly he lived at the Byfield Guest House at Painswick in the Stroud District. He died aged 81 at the Gloucestershire Royal Infirmary in Gloucester on 7 October 1946. In his will he left an estate valued at £1,103 4s 2d. On 30 October 1946 his widow Catherine married his nephew, Edward Stewart James.
