= Huntley Wright =

English actor (1868–1941)

Huntley Wright circa 1908

Huntley Wright (7 August 1868 – 10 July 1941) was an English stage and film actor, comedian, dancer and singer, best known for creating roles in many important Edwardian musical comedies.

His career spanned more than half a century, beginning with performances in his family's touring theatre company. He then toured extensively in burlesque and other comedies and also appeared in London. In 1895, he toured in South Africa in a musical comedy, The Shop Girl. Beginning in 1896, he spent ten years creating roles in some of the era's most popular musical comedies for George Edwardes at Daly's Theatre. He continued playing in musicals in the West End and on Broadway until World War I, when he served in the British Army. After this, he continued to play in comedies, musical theatre and drama, also broadcasting frequently on the radio and appearing in several films later in his career.

Wright's daughter, Betty Huntley-Wright, had a successful television and film career.

== Early years ==
Born Walter Thomas Curtis Wright in London, he was one of five children of Frederick Wright, Sr. (1828–1911) and his wife Jessie, née Francis (born 1841), both actors and comedians. His brother, Fred Wright Jr. (1865–1928), was also a successful actor in musical comedy, and his sisters, Maria "Marie" Wright (born 1864) and Ada "Haidee" Wright (1867–1943), and brother, Albert "Bertie" Wright (born 1871), were all actors.

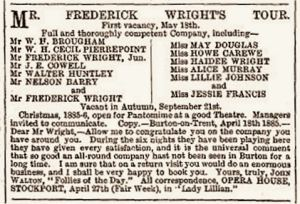
1885 advertisement for the Wright family company, listing Wright under his early stage name Walter Huntley

Wright was educated at George Watson's College, Edinburgh, where he became a fine footballer at both forms of the game. He continued to play until his sporting injuries put his stage career at risk. He wished for a naval career, but his eyesight precluded it, and, despite his parents' disapproval, he pursued a career in the theatre.

Apart from an appearance as a baby in his mother's arms in a melodrama, his stage début was as a teenager in the role of Dr Winsley Andrewes in False Lights at the Royal Edinburgh Theatre with his family's touring theatre company, the Frederick Wright Dramatic Company. Ada Reeve performed as a child with this company and also performed with Wright in 1896 in Dick Whittington and His Cat in Leeds. He performed under the name Walter Huntley before taking on his better-known stage name of Huntley Wright in 1889.

After several more years playing a variety of roles on tour, including Danny Man in Dion Boucicault's The Colleen Bawn, he again performed in London's West End in 1891 as Springe the birdcatcher in Fate and Fortune. He toured for three years in his own burlesque, Dashing Prince Hal. In 1894, he had a short engagement at Terry's Theatre, where he played in King Kodak, a topical burlesque, and The Foundling, a farce. He played Dr. Montague Brierly during part of the run of A Gaiety Girl at Daly's Theatre. He then went to South Africa with one of George Edwardes's companies, playing Miggles in The Shop Girl. On his return to London, he joined Edwardes' production of An Artist's Model at the Lyric Theatre.

== Musical comedy comedian ==
as Heliodorus in A Greek Slave

In 1896, Edwardes engaged Wright for regular work in his musical comedies at Daly's Theatre in London. According to The Times, "it is on that 10 years' engagement at Daly's, from 1896 to 1905, that the memories of his many devoted admirers most fondly dwell." Wright performed and created characters in many of Edwardes's most famous musical comedies, including: The Geisha (1896, as Wun-Hi), A Greek Slave (1898, as Heliodorus), San Toy (1899, as Li), A Country Girl (1902, as Barry), The Cingalee (1904, as Chambhuddy Ram), The Little Michus (1905, as Bagnolet) and See-See (1906, as Hang-Kee). The Times also said of this period of his career, "those who remember the neat, perky, birdlike little man in these musical comedies, with his precise diction and his finished movements, will quote to each other his drolleries, and hug his memory in unashamed, selfish, and inexhaustible enjoyment."

In 1898, Wright married the actress Christine Monica Margaret Taylor in London. They separated in 1907 and were divorced in 1911. They had no children. In the same year, Wright married Mary Smith, known by her stage name of Mary Fraser, the sister of actress Agnes Fraser, wife of the Savoyard Walter Passmore. They had three children, one of whom, Betty Huntley-Wright, went on to a successful television and film career.

as Li in San Toy

In 1905, Wright was also engaged by Charles Frohman for productions at the Comedy Theatre. His roles included Montague Sibsey in The Mountain Climber. In 1907 he performed in the Broadway productions of Les p'tites Michu and The Dairy Maids. Back in England, his appearances included King of Cadonia (1908, as the Duke of Alasia), Dear Little Denmark (1909, as Hansen), The Girl in the Train (1910, as President Van Eyck),The Count of Luxembourg (1911, as Grand Duke Rutzinov), and Autumn Manoeuvres (1912, as Captain Withers). In 1913 he appeared with the Follies at the Coliseum in a successful "tabloid musical comedy", Simple 'Earted Bill.

== Later years ==
During World War I Wright enlisted as a Trooper in the British Army's Middlesex Yeomanry. He subsequently received a commission as a Second Lieutenant into the Middlesex Yeomanry and ended the war as a Lieutenant in the Army Service Corps. He was demobilised in 1919. He was back on stage in Three Pips and a Petticoat at the Coliseum in 1919, and appeared in A Breath of Fresh Air in 1920 and as Poire in Sybil at Daly's in 1921.

as Barry, disguised as Edna, in A Country Girl, 1902

Wright's later stage appearances included The Lady of the Rose (as Suitangi, 1922 and also a 1929 revival), and Madame Pompadour (1923, as Joseph Calicot). In May 1929 he made his 5,000th appearance at Daly's, in a revival of The Lady of the Rose. In 1931 he played Gaspard in Les cloches de Corneville and was praised by The Manchester Guardian: "quite remarkable old-school acting ... a true stylist." In 1935 Wright appeared in The Unknown Warrior, at the Arts Theatre Club, playing a serious role, for which he was respectfully reviewed. He also received praise for his appearance as Dunce the puritan in The Soldier's Fortune (1935), a revival of a restoration comedy by Thomas Otway.

Wright was an early and prolific exponent of broadcasting, making frequent radio appearances in operetta, plays and musical comedies on the BBC. In October and November 1927, for example, he starred in complete transmissions of Miss Hook of Holland, The Cousin from Nowhere, and The Rose of Persia and he sustained a similar pattern of frequent broadcasting for the rest of his career. He also appeared in several films, including the film version of San Toy (1902), Going Straight (1933), The Empress and I (1933), Ich und Die Kaiserin (1933), Heart Song (1933), The Only Girl (1934), and Look up and Laugh (1935), as well as an early television production of The Little Father of the Wilderness (1939).

In late August 1939, with war looming, journalist Roy Peskett met Wright at Lord's Cricket Ground, and the two watched an innings by Bill Edrich. Peskett recalled, "the dapper, immaculately dressed Wright turned to me and, with his face expressing tragedy that gained nothing from his seventy years of service on the stage, said, 'When, oh when shall we see the like again?'"

Wright died of a heart attack at the age of 72 in Bangor, Wales.
