= Leedham Bantock =

British screenwriter and actor (1870–1928)

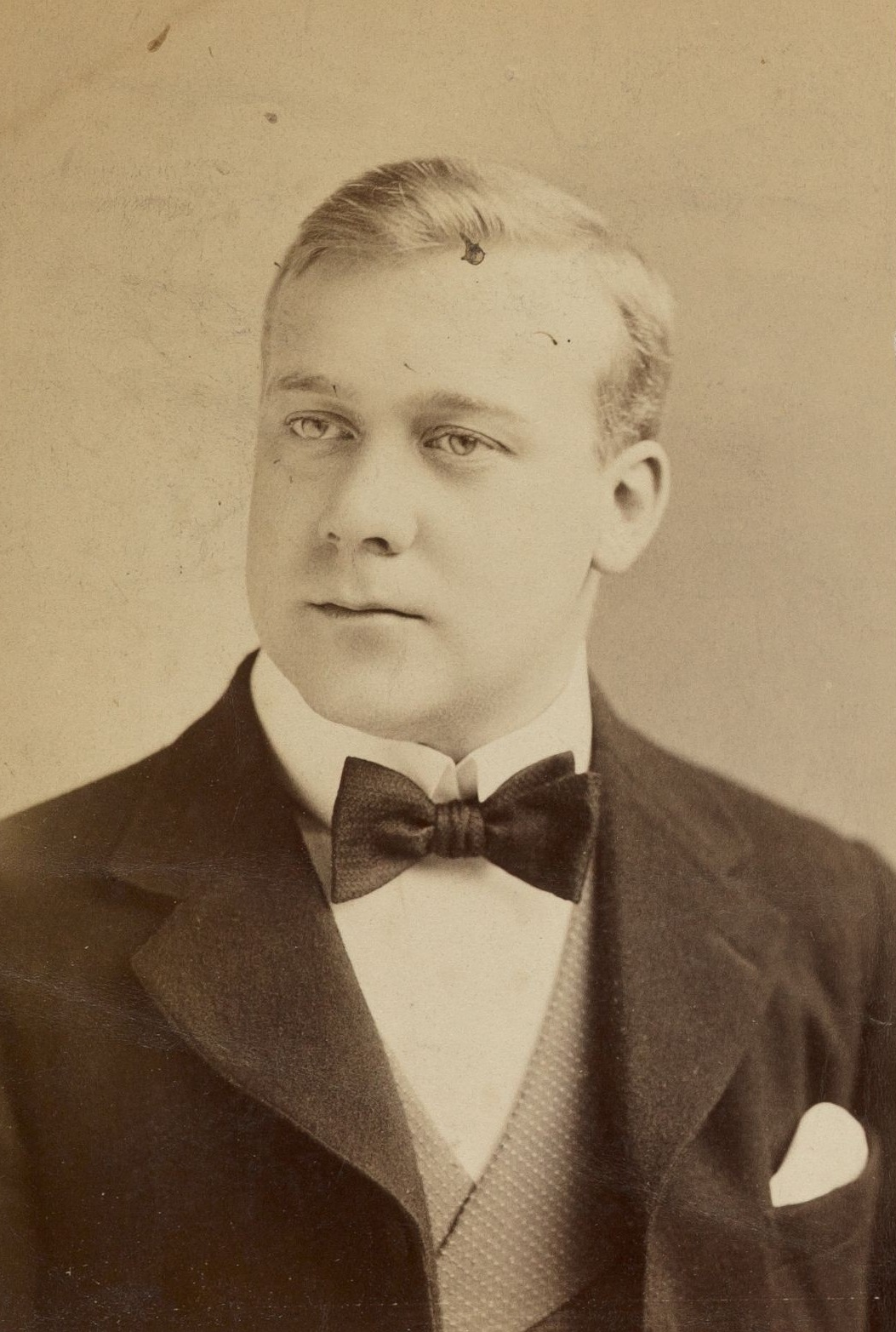
- Bantock c.1918
- Born: Ernest Leedham Sutherland Bantock; 18 May 1870; Marylebone, London, U.K.
- Died: 16 October 1928 (aged 58); Richmond, Surrey, U.K.
- Occupations: Actor; Screenwriter; Dramatist; Director
- Years active: 1890–1927
- Spouse: Laura May Peacock (m. 1917)
- Children: 2
- Relatives: Sir Granville Bantock (brother)

Leedham Bantock (born Ernest Leedham Sutherland Bantock; 18 May 1870 – 16 October 1928) was a British singer, Edwardian musical comedy actor, early film director, dramatist and screenwriter. In 1912 he became the first actor to portray Father Christmas in film.

== Early life ==
Bantock was born at 12 Granville Place in Marylebone in London. He was one of eight children of Sophia Elizabeth née Ransome (1843–1909) and George Granville Bantock (1836–1913), a Scottish surgeon and gynaecologist who was at one time President of the Royal Gynaecological Society. His brothers included the composer Sir Granville Bantock (1868–1946) and Claude Ronald Bantock (1875–1921), who had a successful career in musical theatre in Australia.

Bantock's father was a remote and stern figure in his childhood and a man of strict principle in his work who challenged Joseph Lister in a famous scientific debate over surgical disinfectant and eventually proved his case at some cost to his reputation. However, Bantock's mother, "Bessie", created an affectionate atmosphere in their home, allowing her children to play cricket in the corridors and keeping a menagerie of animals in the house including snakes and a monkey. Her three sons inherited their artistic temperament from her. With his brother Granville, Bantock wrote a couple of music hall songs that met with some success.

== Theatre career ==
Lawrence Rea (left), Walter Passmore, Ruth Vincent and Maud Boyd (right) in Bantock's The Belle of Brittany (1908)

A bass-baritone, Bantock played Sharp in The Married Bachelor (1890) at the Adelphi Theatre and Peter Poddleson in The Refugees (1891) at the Opera Comique before appearing in the London companies of George Edwardes for 20 years in secondary roles in a string of musicals including Marius/Fill-up the Good in Joan of Arc (1891) at the Gaiety Theatre, Harry Fitzwarren in A Gaiety Girl (1893), James Cripps in An Artist's Model (1895), Arthur Cuddy in The Geisha (1896), The Emperor in San Toy (1894), Tubby Bedford in The School Girl (1903), Douglas Verity in A Country Girl (1902), Boobhamba in The Cingalee (1904) and Colonel Leyton in Lady Madcap (1906), as well as in America and Australia where he played Hopkins in In Town, Bertie Boyd in The Shop Girl, Dawson in Gentleman Joe and Sir Lewis in A Gaiety Girl.

Bantock also worked as both a director (including for Marie Lloyd's only appearance in musical theatre The ABC (1898)) and as an author and dramatist, collaborating with Howard Talbot on the books for such musical comedies as The Girl Behind the Counter (1906). He wrote the book to Talbot's music for The White Chrysanthemum (1905) and The Belle of Brittany (1908) which, like The Girl Behind the Counter, proved to be successful in Britain and abroad. Other works on which Bantock worked as a librettist include The Three Kisses (1907) with Talbot and Percy Greenbank; A Persian Princess (1909) with Sidney Jones and Percy Greenbank, and Physical Culture (1917) with Harold Simpson. On 1 December 1899 Bantock was initiated as a Freemason.

== Film career ==
Bantock in 1912

In 1912 Bantock became the first actor to be identified to have played Santa Claus, in a film titled Santa Claus, which he also wrote and co-directed. From 1913 to 1915 Bantock was the Managing Director of Zenith Films, for whom he worked in silent films as an actor, director and writer, writing and directing Ivanhoe (1913); directing and acting in Scrooge (1913) and directing David Garrick (1913), The Shopsoiled Girl (1915), The Beggar Girl's Wedding (1915) and The Veiled Woman (1917).

== Marriage ==
In 1917 in Barnet in Middlesex he married Gaiety Theatre chorus girl Laura May Peacock and with her had two sons.

== Later years ==
In his later years Bantock was the General Manager of the Lyceum Theatre in London and for which he wrote the annual pantomime, including that for The Sleeping Beauty (1920), Robinson Crusoe (1922), Jack and the Beanstalk (1923), The Forty Thieves (1924), Dick Whittington (1925) and Queen of Hearts (1927).

He lived in a modest terraced house at 19 Beaumont Avenue in Richmond in Surrey, where he died in 1928, aged 58, leaving just £140 10s 4d to his wife in his will. By 1930 this sum was gone, causing financial hardship for his widow and sons and, on the advice of her late husband's brother Granville, after whom her youngest son was named, she put her two sons into the Actors' Orphanage at Langley Hall in order to take in lodgers. Her sons remained there for at least eight years.

== Filmography ==
=== Film director ===
Bantock as Santa Claus and Margaret Favronova as Ting-a-ling in the 1912 film Santa Claus

- Seymour Hicks and Ellaline Terriss (1913)
- Ivanhoe (1913) starring Lauderdale Maitland as Ivanhoe
- Scrooge (1913) starring Seymour Hicks and Ellaline Terriss
- David Garrick (1913) starring Seymour Hicks and Ellaline Terriss
- A Motorcycle Elopement (1914)
- Always Tell Your Wife (1914)
- A Patriotic English Girl (1914)
- Kismet (1914) – film of the 1911 play starring Oscar Asche and Lily Brayton
- From Flower Girl to Red Cross Nurse (1915)
- A Prehistoric Love Story (1915) starring Hicks and Terriss
- A Daughter of England (1915)
- The Beggar Girl's Wedding (1915)
- The Girl of My Heart (1915)
- The Girl Who Took the Wrong Turning (1915)
- The Shopsoiled Girl (1915)
- The Veiled Woman (1917)

=== Screenwriter ===
- Mephisto (1912), directed by Alfred de Manby and F. Martin Thornton
- Santa Claus (1912), directed by Walter R. Booth, R. H. Callum and Thornton
- Ivanhoe (1913), also directed by Bantock
- The Tempter (1913), directed by Callum and Thornton

=== Film actor ===
- Santa Claus (1912), directed by Walter R. Booth, Callum and Thornton
- Scrooge (1913), also directed by Bantock
- The Tempter (1913), directed by Callum and Thornton
