= The Critic (play) =

1779 play by Richard Brinsley Sheridan

- Written by: Richard Brinsley Sheridan
- Based on: The Rehearsal by George Villiers
- Genre: Satire

Premiere
- Date: 30 October 1779
- Place: Theatre Royal, Drury Lane

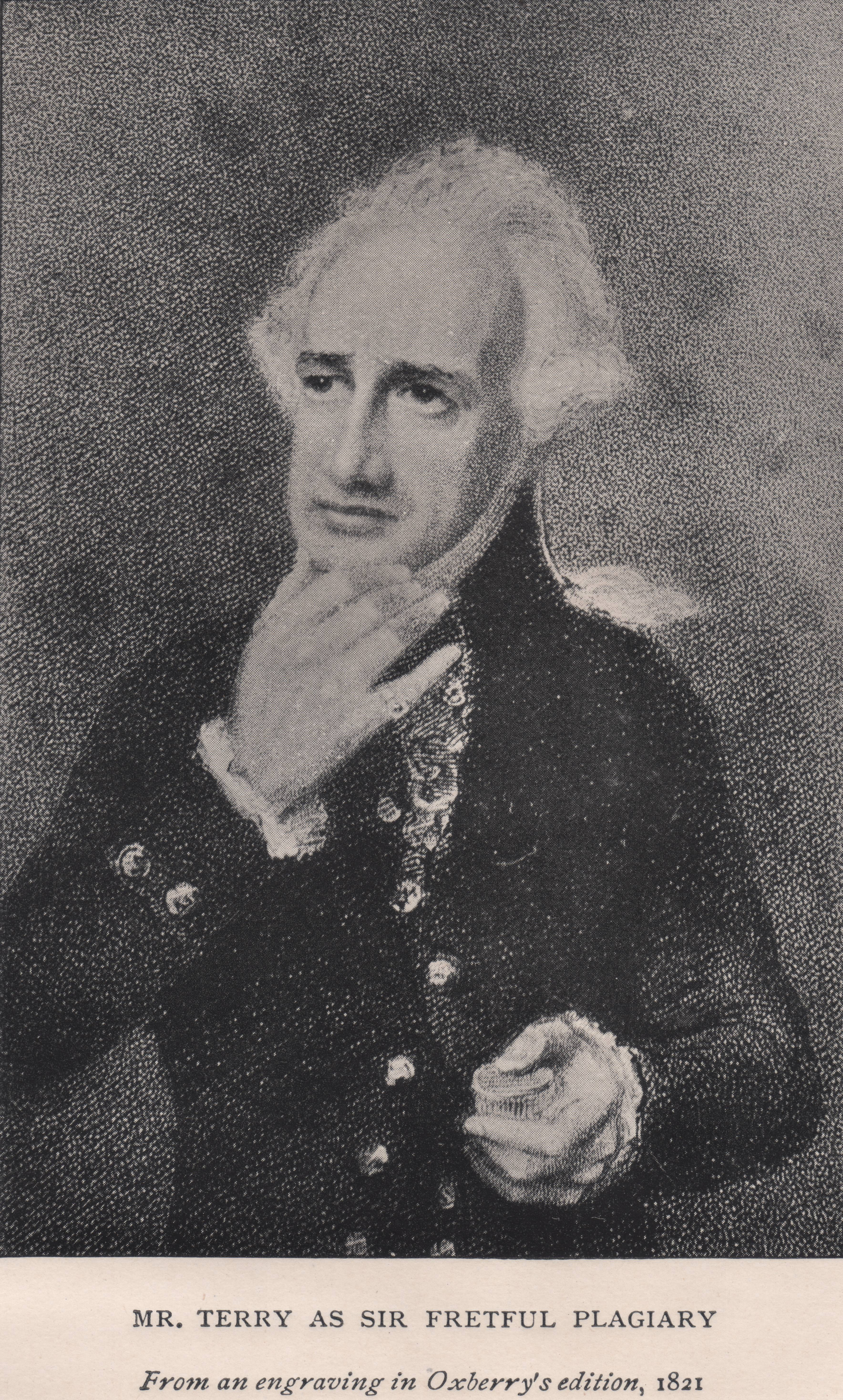
Daniel Terry as Sir Fretful Plagiary

The Critic: or, a Tragedy Rehearsed is a satire by Richard Brinsley Sheridan. It was first staged at Drury Lane Theatre in 1779. It is a burlesque on stage acting and play production conventions, and Sheridan considered the first act to be his finest piece of writing. One of its major roles, Sir Fretful Plagiary, is a comment on the vanity of authors, and in particular a caricature of the dramatist Richard Cumberland who was a contemporary of Sheridan.

Based on George Villiers' The Rehearsal, it concerns misadventures that arise when an author, Mr Puff, invites Sir Fretful Plagiary and the theatre critics Dangle and Sneer to a rehearsal of his play The Spanish Armada, Sheridan's parody of the then-fashionable tragic drama.

In 1824, English schoolmaster Richard Valpy adapted the play, abridging it and placing the action in the present day. Performed by male school children, it functioned as an afterpiece to Euripides's Alcestis.

In 1911, Herbert Beerbohm Tree mounted a star-studded production of The Critic at Her Majesty's Theatre starring George Alexander, Cecil Armstrong, Beatrice Ferrar, Arthur Bourchier, C. Hayden Coffin, Kenneth Douglas, Lily Elsie, Winifred Emery, George Graves, George Grossmith Jr., Edmund Gurney, John Harwood, Charles Hawtrey, Helen Haye, Laurence Irving, Cyril Maude, Gerald du Maurier, Gertie Millar, Edmund Payne, Courtice Pounds, Marie Tempest, Violet Vanbrugh and Arthur Williams. In 1946, Laurence Olivier played the role of Mr. Puff in a famous production of the play at The Old Vic, alternating with Sophocles's Oedipus Rex. In 1982, Hywel Bennett starred in a BBC television production which was also broadcast in the U.S. on the A&E channel.

The play was adapted as an opera in two acts by Sir Charles Villiers Stanford; it received its premiere in London in 1916.

The Shakespeare Theatre Company, Washington, DC, premiered the play in an updated version by Jeffrey Hatcher on 5 January 2016. The production paired the play with The Real Inspector Hound by Tom Stoppard in the same performance, performing The Critic in the first half, and the Stoppard play after intermission. The same double bill was produced at the Guthrie Theater, Minneapolis, Minnesota, opening on 23 February 2016.

Charles Spencer of The Telegraph billed The Critic as "a gem", writing that it "offers a vivid impression of the dramatists, theatre buffs and critics". Metro Weekly's Kate Wingfield said that the play is "very fun to be with", but also that "despite the luxuriously clever wit (and the cheeky bounce delivered by Jeffrey Hatcher’s adaptation), [it] is the decidedly sillier of the two ... once it settles into the call-and-answer routine of the play rehearsal, the farce largely overtakes the wit." Dominic P. Papatola of St. Paul Pioneer Press described The Critic as a "piffle" that now feels dated. Conversely, The Guardian's Michael Billington said that "when Mr Sneer talks of a moralising writer whose idea is 'to dramatise the penal laws', he seems to be anticipating our own move towards edifying verbatim theatre."
