= Katie Seymour =

English dancer and entertainer (1870–1903)

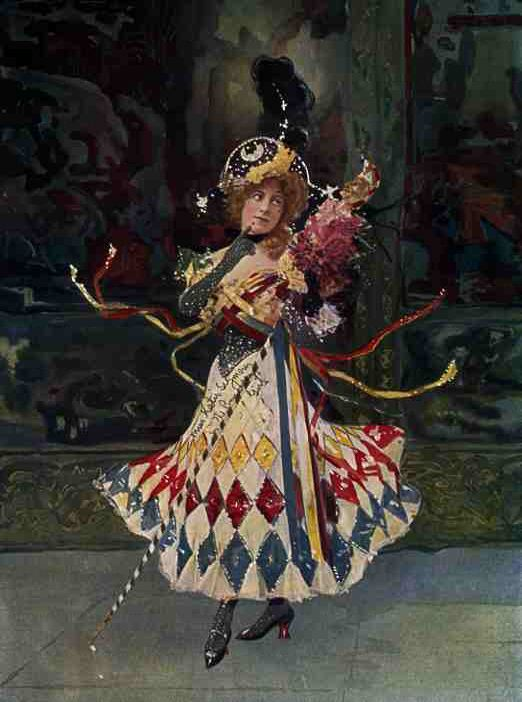
- Katie Seymour as Alice in A Runaway Girl
- Born: 9 January 1870; Nottingham, England
- Died: 7 September 1903 (aged 33); London, England
- Other names: Kate Seymour Athol
- Occupation: British dancer

Katie Seymour (9 January 1870 – 7 September 1903) was a British Victorian burlesque and Edwardian musical comedy entertainer who was remembered primarily for her dancing. She was considered, if not the first, one of the first to perform a style of dance called the skirt dance. Seymour began in song and dance routines at a very young age and would go on to appear in a string of highly successful long-running musicals staged at London's Gaiety Theatre during the 1890s. She fell ill in 1903 while on a theatrical tour of British South Africa and died not long after her return voyage home.

== Early life ==
Catherine Phoebe Seymour was born in Nottingham to showfolk, William John Seymour and Phoebe Towers. Her father was a music hall comedian and singer, while her mother came from a noted family of actors. Seymour never attended dance classes, but instead received her early instructions from her mother who had been trained in an Italian style of classical dance.

== Career 1875–1890 ==
She first appeared on stage in 1875 as a member of Mr. Chatterton's Children's Pantomime Company, and the following year, billed as, "the Little Wonder", six-year-old Seymour sang and danced a version of the hornpipe on 13 March at The Town Hall, London. That Christmas at London's Adelphi Theatre she was one of eighteen children to perform in a pantomime E. L. Blanchard based on the fairy tale, Little Goody Two-Shoes and Her Sweetheart Little Boy-Blue. In the play, which also included eleven-year-old Connie Gilchrist as Harlequin, Seymour played Colin, a peasant boy, Puck, and a tricksy dancing spirit. A few years later, in fall 1879, she was Tim, a tiger, in a burlesque piece at London's Philharmonic Theatre entitled, Drury-lane and Park-lane.

By 3 April 1881, Seymour was listed as one of the variety performers with the Middlesex Music Hall, Drury Lane and by 14 September 1884, she was a performing at the Sun Palace of Varieties, Knightsbridge. The following month she was appearing at both the Middlesex Music Hall and the Royal Foresters Music Hall, Graydon's Palace of Varieties, Cambridge Road. By February 1885 at Deacon's Music Hall, Clerkenwell, Seymour was appearing in a comedy sketch with the Three Brothers Horn entitled Juggins Junior. From February 1886 through July 1889 Seymour appeared as a variety entertainer at the Royal Holborn Theatre, London Pavilion and the Empire Theatre of Varieties (now the Empire, Leicester Square).

Over the 1889–90 season Seymour toured America as a dancer with Professor Hermann's Transatlantiques Vaudevilles company. During the tour one American press release described Seymour as having hair that "streamed down her shoulders like rivers of gold". and another declared "Dainty Katie Seymour dances like a fairy or butterfly". By August 1890 she was a member of the Bank Holiday Company at London's Oxford Music Hall.

== Career 1891–1902 ==
Seymour made her debut at the Gaiety Theatre on 31 September 1891 as a dancer in Joan of Arc an opéra bouffe by John L. Shine, Adrian Ross and composer Frank Osmond Carr. In mid-December Joan of Arc transferred to the Shaftesbury Theatre where it remained through January 1892. A critic with the St James's Gazette wrote of Seymour's first night's performance in Joan of Arc:

Miss Katie Seymour, who used to dance so prettily at music-halls, now dances more prettily in a pas seul, pas de deux (her cleverest performance) and a pas de trois. Miss Lethbridge is really the more graceful of the two, but Miss Seymour is the more piquant.

On 6 February 1892 at the Prince of Wales's Theatre, Seymour danced in the debut of Blue-Eyed Susan, a comic opera by George R. Sims, Henry Pettitt and Frank Osmond Carr based on Douglas Jerrold's Black Eyed Susan. Seymour stayed with Black Eyed Susan through June, after which she assumed the role of Fettalana to Letty Lind's Cinder-Ellen and Sylvia Grey's Linconsina for the last few performances at the Grand Theatre of the popular burlesque comedy, Cinder Ellen up too Late.

Over the summer and early fall of 1892 Seymour toured with Cinder-Ellen up too Late and remained with the show when it reappeared at the Gaiety Theatre at the beginning of October for a run that would continue until mid-December. A few days after Christmas she was engaged at the Empire Theatre to dance in, Round the Town, described as a characteristic ballet in five tableaux by Katti Lanner and George Edwardes.

After an eight-month run in Round the Town, Seymour returned to the Gaiety Theatre on 9 September 1893, where she would remain until 1901, to appear in Edwardes' revival of Audran's comic opera La Mascotte, and on 21 October, Don Juan, a burlesque by James T. Tanner, with lyrics and music by Adrian Ross and Meyer Lutz, respectively. During the eight-month run of Don Juan, Seymour teamed up with Edmund Payne in a separate piece entitle, The Candle and the Moth, in which the two performed the "Bon-Bon Dance".

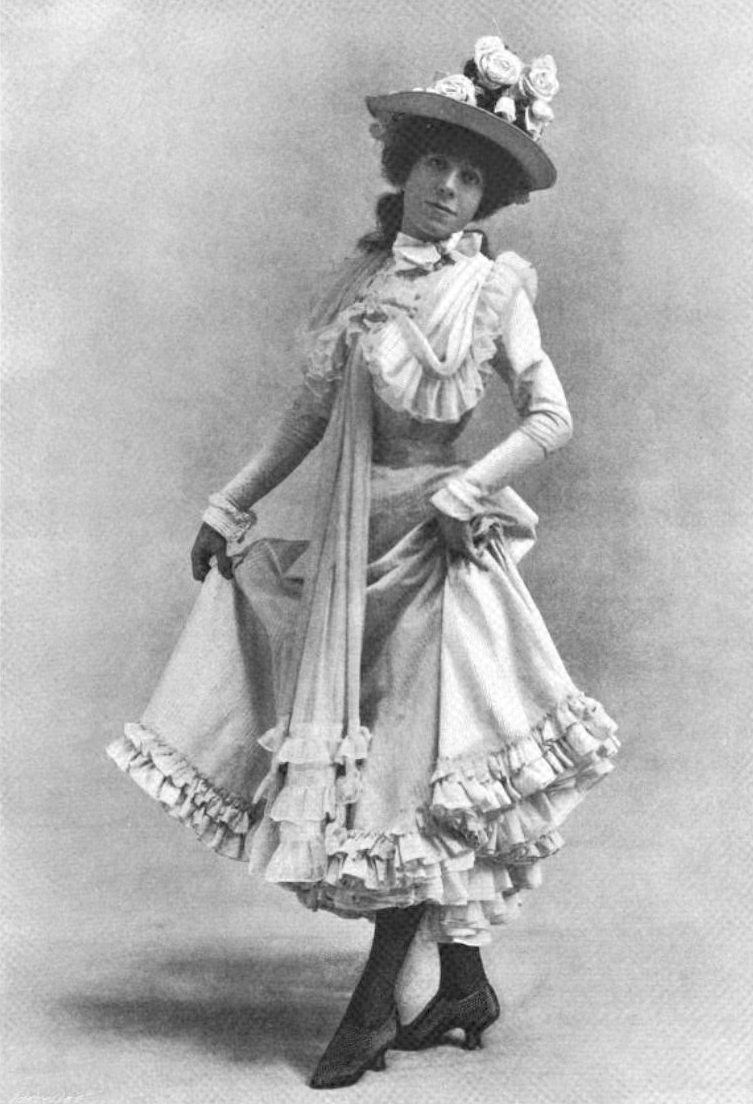
As Rosa in The Messenger Boy

Don Juan closed at the end of June 1894 and was followed that November with Seymour in the role of Miss Robinson, a fitter with the Royal Store, in The Shop Girl, a musical comedy H. J. W. Dam and Adrian Ross. The Shop Girl proved to be a huge success with a phenomenal two-year run. From July through November 1896 she was Phoebe Toodge, May's (Ellaline Terriss) maid, in My Girl, another musical comedy from Tanner and Ross. On 5 December Seymour opened as Lucille, a slack wire walker, in The Circus Girl, a musical comedy in two acts by James Tanner and Walter Apllant (aka W. Palings), with lyrics by Harry Greenbank and Adrian Ross, music by Ivan Caryll, with further music from Lionel Monckton. Another hit, The Circus Girl remained at the Gaiety until mid-April 1898 and was followed a month later by A Runaway Girl, a musical comedy by Seymour Hicks and Harry Nichols with music by Ivan Caryll and Lionel Moncton. A Runaway Girl, in which Katie Seymour played Alice, Lady Coodle's maid, closed on 13 July 1900 after run of nearly twenty months. She next played Rosa, another maid (Lady Punchestown's) in The Messenger Boy, a musical comedy in two acts by James T. Tanner and Alfred Murray, lyrics by Adrian Ross and Percy Greenbank, with music by Ivan Caryll and Lionel Monckton, with additional numbers by Paul Rubens. Seymour remained with A Messenger Boy through February 1901.

Counter to George Edwardes' advice, Seymour chose to leave the Gaiety to share top billing with James E. Sullivan in a revival of The Casino Girl that was produced at the Knickerbocker Theatre, Broadway on 8 April 1901. The Casino Girl ran until 11 May after which, toward the end of June, she was engaged at the Knickerbocker as a feature dancer in The Strollers, a musical comedy by Harry B. Smith and Ludwig Englander that starred Francis Wilson.

In May 1901 it was reported in the press that Seymour had become the first woman in New York City to be arrested for speeding. She was stopped on Fifth Avenue, not far from Central Park, for driving at an excessive speed and escorted to a nearby police station where she was assigned a court date and required to pay a modest deposit to encourage her attendance.

By October 1901 Seymour had returned to London where gave her opinion of the state of American dancers to the press:

There are no American dancers except perhaps toe dancers and the cake-walk style. Dancing is not cultivated there as it is here. I am very glad to be at home again.

Later that month Seymour began an engagement at the Alhambra Theatre as variety entertainer that would extend into December and the next year, on 3 February, she opened at the Holloway Empire Theatre billed as Katie Seymour and Chorus of Lady Singers and Dancers.

== Death ==
Seymour died of a renal affliction at a nursing home in the Maida Vale district of London on 7 September 1903. She had become ill while on a tour of South Africa with one of George Edwardes' theatrical companies. Seymour was survived by her husband, Harry Athol, a music hall comedian who had been a member of Professor Hermann's Transatlantiques Vaudevilles during her first American trip. Seymour's well attended funeral services were held at her residence on Burton Road, Brixton and were concluded at Lambeth Cemetery, Tooting.
