= A Gaiety Girl =

1893 English musical comedy

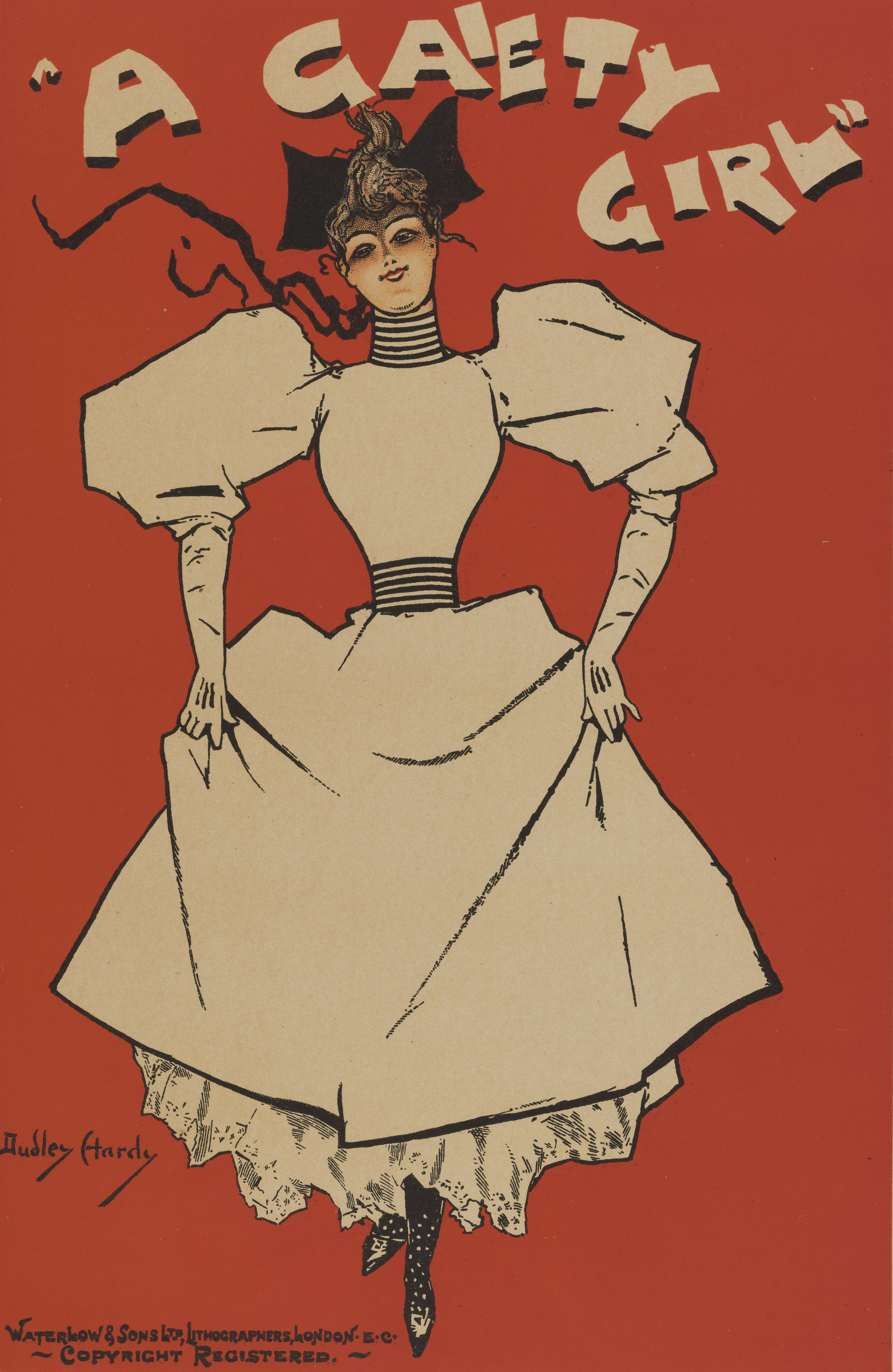
- Lithograph
- Music: Sidney Jones
- Lyrics: Harry Greenbank
- Book: Owen Hall
- Productions: 1893 West End

A Gaiety Girl is an English musical comedy in two acts by a team of musical comedy neophytes: Owen Hall (book, on an outline by James T. Tanner), Harry Greenbank (lyrics) and Sidney Jones (music). It opened at Prince of Wales Theatre in London, produced by George Edwardes, on 14 October 1893 (later transferring to Daly's Theatre) and ran for 413 performances. The show starred C. Hayden Coffin, Louie Pounds, Decima Moore, Eric Lewis, W. Louis Bradfield, and later Rutland Barrington, George Grossmith, Jr., Scott Russell, Huntley Wright and Marie Studholme. Topsy Sinden and later Letty Lind danced in the piece. Choreography was by Willie Warde. Percy Anderson designed the Japanese costumes for the musical, while the non-Japanese costumes were supplied by leading fashion houses. Blanche Massey was one of the Gaiety Girls in the piece. It also had a successful three-month Broadway run in 1894, followed by an American tour and a world tour.

== Importance in the development of the modern musical ==
A Gaiety Girl followed Tanner's and Edwardes's success with In Town (1892), and would lead to a series of musicals produced by Edwardes that would pack the Gaiety Theatre for decades. Although the earliest of these shows have a score similar in character to Gilbert and Sullivan's operas, Edwardes called them "musical comedies", leading some writers to incorrectly credit him with inventing a form that Harrigan & Hart and others had established on Broadway a decade or more earlier. Although Edwardes was not the true inventor of musical comedy, he was the first to elevate these works to international popularity. According to musical theatre writer Andrew Lamb, "The British Empire and America began to fall for the appeal of the British musical comedy from the time when A Gaiety Girl was taken on a world tour in 1894."

The plot of A Gaiety Girl is a simple intrigue about a stolen comb and includes a few tangled romances, "a crazy quilt of mistaken identity, imposters, villains, class barriers, and a day at the beach, elements that showed up in dozens of musicals in London and New York in subsequent seasons." Hall's satirical book includes lines which jab at society conventions in the style of an upmarket gossip columnist. The smart society back-chat irritated several people in high places in London who wrote to Edwardes asking for alterations. The public, on the other hand, loved it, even when the Reverend Brierly, a character depicted as a man of doubtful moral rectitude, was demoted, after pressure from Lambeth Palace, to being just plain Dr. Brierly. Satire is also directed, among other things, at the army, and the story ridicules a judge of the divorce court, which caused some controversy.

A Gaiety Girl's success confirmed Edwardes on the path he was taking. He immediately set Hall, Jones and Greenbank to work on their next show, An Artist's Model. A Gaiety Girl led to some fourteen copies (including The Shop Girl, The Circus Girl and A Runaway Girl), which were very successful in England for the next two decades, and were widely imitated by other producers and playwriting teams.

== The Gaiety Girls ==
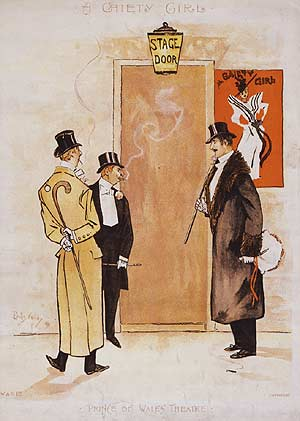
Stage Door Johnnies waiting at the stage door after A Gaiety Girl

The show's popularity depended, in part, on the beautiful "Gaiety Girls" dancing chorus appearing onstage in bathing attire and in the latest fashions. According to The Brooklyn Daily Eagle, "The piece is a mixture of pretty girls, English humor, singing, dancing and bathing machines and dresses of the English fashion. The dancing is a special feature of the performance, English burlesques giving much more attention to that feature of their attractiveness than the American entertainments of the same grade do." The 1890s Gaiety Girls were polite, well-behaved young women, respectable and elegant, unlike the corseted actresses from the earlier burlesques. They became a popular attraction and a symbol of ideal womanhood. Many of the best-known London couturiers designed costumes for stage productions by the 1890s, particularly for the Gaiety Girls. The illustrated periodicals were eager to publish photographs of the actresses in the latest stage hits, and so the theatre became an excellent way for clothiers to publicise their latest fashions.

The young ladies appearing in George Edwardes's shows became so popular that wealthy gentlemen, termed "Stage Door Johnnies", would wait outside the stage door hoping to escort them to dinner. In some cases, a marriage into society and even the nobility resulted. Alan Hyman, an expert on burlesque theatre who penned the 1972 book The Gaiety Years, wrote:

...the chorus was becoming a matrimonial agency for girls with ambitions to marry into the peerage and began in the nineties when Connie Gilchrist, a star of the Old Gaiety, married the 7th Earl of Orkney and then in 1901, the 4th Marquess of Headfort married Rosie Boote, who had charmed London the previous year when she sang Maisie in The Messenger Boy. After Connie Gilchrist and Rosie Boote had started the fashion a score of the Guv'nor's budding stars left him to marry peers or men of title while other Gaiety Girls settled for a banker or a stockbroker....

== Roles and original London cast ==
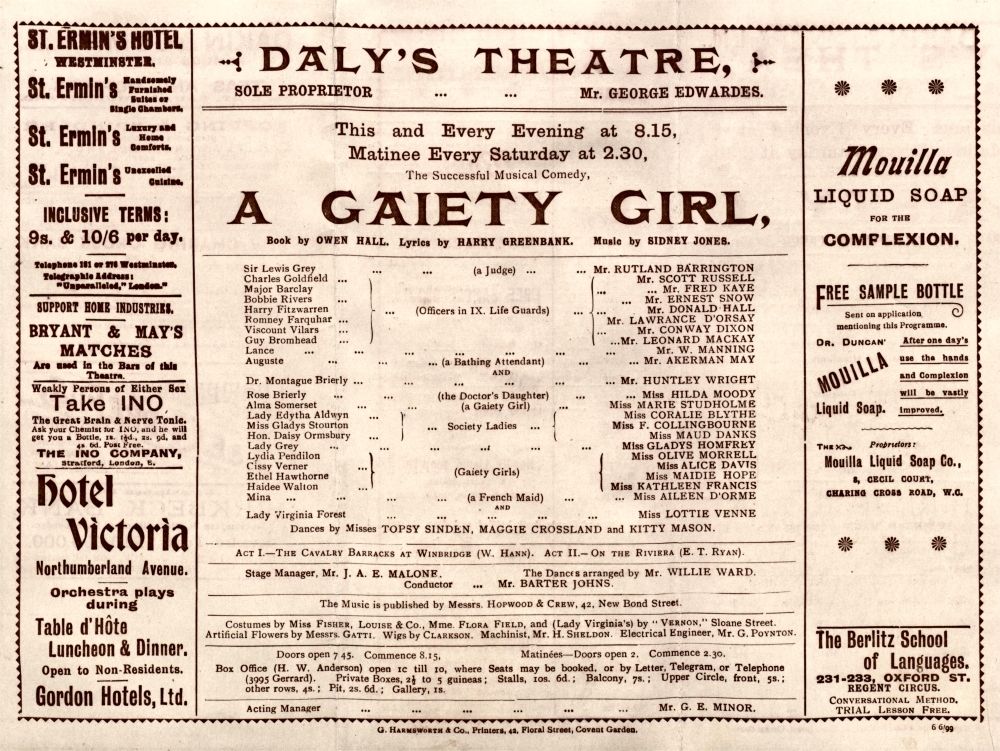
Theatre programme from 1894

Decima Moore as Rose

- Sir Lewis Gray (a judge) - Eric Lewis (later replaced by Rutland Barrington)

Officers in the Life Guards
Charles Goldfield - C. Hayden Coffin (later replaced by Scott Russell)
Major Barclay - Fred Kaye
Bobbie Rivers - W. Louis Bradfield (later replaced by Farren Soutar)
Harry Fitzwarren - Leedham Bantock
Romney Farquhar - Lawrance D'Orsey

- Lance - Gilbert Porteous
- Auguste (a bathing attendant) - Fitz Rimma
- Dr. Montague Brierly - Harry Monkhouse (later replaced by Huntley Wright)
- Rose Brierly (his daughter) - Decima Moore
- Lady Edytha Aldwyn (a Society lady) - Kate Cutler
- Miss Gladys Stourton (a Society lady) - Marie Studholme (later replaced by Coralie Blythe)
- Hon. Daisy Ormsbury (a Society lady) - Louie Pounds
- Lady Grey - E. Phelps

Gaiety Girls
Alma Somerset (the title character) - Maud Hobson (later replaced by Marie Studholme)
Cissy Verner - Blanche Massey
Haidee Walton - Ethel Selwick
Ethel Hawthorne - Violet Robinson

- Mina (a French maid) - Juliette Nesville
- Lady Virginia Forest - Lottie Venne, Phyllis Broughton
- Dancers - Topsy Sinden and later Letty Lind

== Synopsis ==
Act I

A party of Gaiety girls and young society ladies are invited to a garden party given by the officers of the Life Guards at Windsor, as are a judge of the divorce court, Sir Lewis Gray, and a chaplain, Dr. Montague Brierly. The officers neglect the society girls and focus on the Gaiety girls, while the judge, who married his housemaid, and the chaplain both amuse themselves at the party in a most unprofessional manner, the judge telling stories of ladies who have appeared before him in court, and the clergyman dancing in an inappropriate manner. The society ladies are chaperoned by a Lady Virginia Forest, who is worried that the judge will not remember her case. One of the Gaiety girls, Alma Somerset, is falsely accused of theft.

Act II

At a beach on the Riviera, all the ladies appear in bathing costumes, and the judge and chaplain flirt with Lady Virginia. Miss Somerset eventually marries Charles Goldfield, a wealthy cavalry officer.

== Musical numbers ==
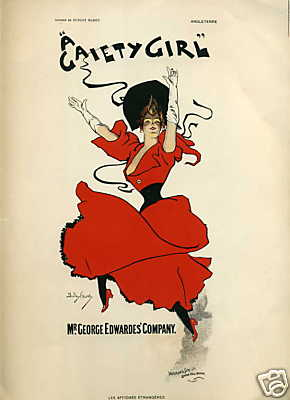
Poster

ACT I – The Cavalry Barracks at Winbridge.

- No. 1 - Chorus - "When a masculine stranger goes by, array'd in a uniform smart"
- No. 2 - Chorus & Sir Lewis - "O sing a welcome fair to Mr. Justice Grey" & "I'm a judge"
- No. 3 - Goldfield - "Beneath the skies of summer sweet I linger where two pathways meet"
- No. 4 - Chorus - "Here come the ladies who dazzle Society"
- No. 5 - Lady Virginia & Chorus - "I am favourably known as a high-class chaperone"
- No. 6 - Concerted piece, with Girls & Major - "To the barracks we have come"
- No. 7 - Dr. Brierly & Rose - "Oh, my daughter, there's a creature known as man"
- No. 8 - Lady Virginia, Sir Lewis & Dr. Brierly - "When once I get hold of a good-looking He"
- No. 9 - Dr. Brierly - "Little Jimmy was a scholar and his aptitude was such"
- No. 10 - Waltz
- No. 11 - Goldfield - "Oh, we take him from the city or the plough"
- No. 12 - Finale Act I - "To my judicial mind there's not a doubt"

ACT II – On the Riviera.

- No. 13 - Chorus - "Here on sunlit sands daintily we figure"
- No. 14 - Concerted piece - "That ladies cannot bathe, if so they please, without encount'ring creatures such as these"
- No. 15 - Rivers, Fitzwarren & Goldfield - "Buck up, buck up, old chappie!"
- No. 16 - Mina - "When your pride has had a tumble, and you've set your cap too high"
- No. 17 - Sir Lewis, Dr. Brierly & Lady Virginia - "When in town you're safely landed, and the doctor far away"
- No. 18 - Rivers & Rose - "Unlucky the morn on which I was born the youngest of several brothers"
- No. 19 - Lady Edytha, Gladys & another - "We're awfully anxious to join in the fun"
- No. 20 - Chorus - "Let folly reign supreme today, for carnival is holding sway"
- No. 21 - Rivers & Chorus - "Mesdames, messieurs, je suis Pierrot. (I'm nothing of the sort, you know)"
- No. 22 - Goldfield - "Sunshine above, and sunshine in my heart! Laughter and love hold carnival today"
- No. 23 - Finale Act II - "I find it's really better far to keep my pranks for Bench and Bar"
