= A Country Girl =

Musical

- or Town and Country
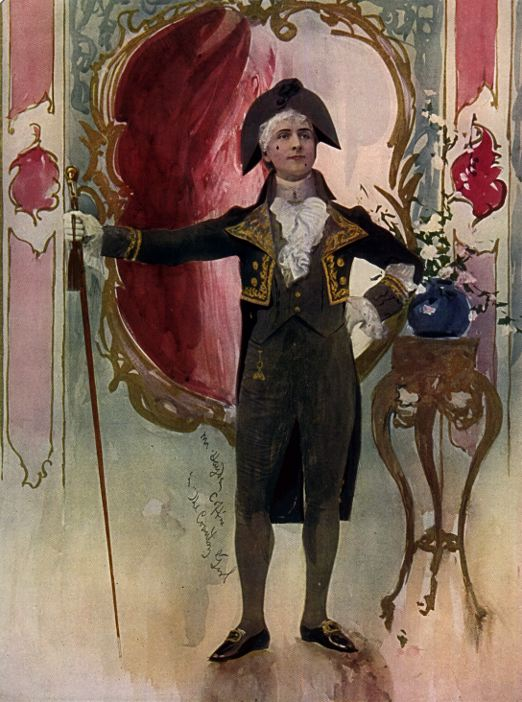
- Hayden Coffin as Geoffrey Challoner
- Music: Lionel Monckton; Paul Rubens
- Lyrics: Adrian Ross; Percy Greenbank
- Book: James T. Tanner
- Productions: 1902 West End; 1911 Broadway

A Country Girl, or, Town and Country is a musical play in two acts by James T. Tanner, with lyrics by Adrian Ross, additional lyrics by Percy Greenbank, music by Lionel Monckton and additional songs by Paul Rubens.

The musical opened at Daly's Theatre in London, managed by George Edwardes, on 18 January 1902 and ran for 729 performances, which was the fourth longest run for any piece of musical theatre up to that time. It starred Hayden Coffin, Bertram Wallis, Evie Greene, Huntley Wright, Lilian Eldeé, Topsy Sinden, Ethel Irving and Rutland Barrington. Isabel Jay joined the cast later, and Gertie Millar starred in the 1914 revival.

The show also enjoyed a Broadway run at Daly's Theatre, starring Melville Stewart, and later revivals and tours. The piece was popular with amateur theatre groups, particularly in Britain, from World War I until about 1960.

This was Lionel Monckton's first score as principal composer, and his songs included "Molly the Marchioness", "Try Again, Johnny", and "Under the Deodar".

== Roles and original cast ==
Huntley Wright (l) as Barry and Willie Warde as Granfer Mummery

- Geoffrey Challoner - C. Hayden Coffin
- The Rajah of Bhong - Rutland Barrington
- Sir Joseph Verity - Frederick Kaye
- Douglas Verity - Leedham Bantock
- Granfer Mummery - Willie Warde
- Lord Anchester - Akerman May
- Lord Grassmere - Bertram Wallis
- Major Vicat - Alfred Hickman
- Sir Charles Cortelyon - Cecil Castle
- Tzanitchff - Fred Vigay
- Rube Fairway - Sebastian King
- Barry - Huntley Wright
- Marjorie Joy - Lilian Eldeé
- Princess Mehelaneh of Bhong - Maggie May
- Nan - Evie Greene
- Madame Sophie - Ethel Irving
- Mrs. Quinton Raikes - Beryl Faber
- Nurse - Edmund Phelps
- Miss Carruthers - Topsy Sinden
- Captain of the Golden Hussars - Olive Morrell
- Lady Anchester - Vera Edwardine
- Miss Powyscourt - Nina Sevening
- Lady Arnott - Olga Beatty-Kingston
- Miss Courtlands - Dora Field
- Miss Ecroyd - Mabel Hurst
- Indian Attendants - Miss Mary Collette and Miss May Snowdon

== Synopsis ==
Act I - A Devonshire Landscape.

Squire Challenor spent much of his family fortune to reopen the tin mines near his village in Devonshire in an effort to give employment to the poor people of the region. On the Squire's death, The Squire's son, Geoffrey, in need of funds, leased his family manor to the wealthy Sir Joseph Verity. Geoffrey then went to sea to seek his fortune. Geoffrey's childhood sweetheart, Marjorie, also left the village, but flirtatious Nan stayed at home, spending time with Sir Joseph, his son Douglas and a number of other gentlemen.

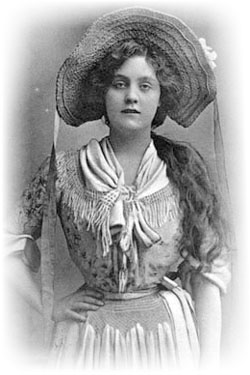
Evie Greene as Nan

Five years after Geoffrey left the village, Sir Joseph has plans for Douglas to be elected to Parliament representing the borough. He also has an interest in the influential society lady, Mrs. Quinton Raikes, recently legally decreed a widow following the disappearance of her husband in the Himalayas. Mrs. Raikes resists his advances, but she is short of money. She agrees that Madam Sophie should stay at the manor as a friend to compensate for not being able to pay her bill. Sophie is in seventh heaven, for this is the village where she grew up, and she is delighted to be able to show her old friends how she has risen in the world.

Geoffrey Challoner and his faithful friend and assistant, Barry, return from the Orient. Barry realizes that the villagers would much prefer to elect Geoffrey to Parliament than the unenthusiastic Douglas, who is more interested in Nan than the election. Marjorie joy has also come back from London where she has become a singing star under an assumed name. She wants Geoffrey to find her as he left her and, hiding her fine clothes, she dons her old blue dress and sunbonnet for their meeting.

Geoffrey's ship has brought some Eastern passengers, the Rajah of Bhong and his fiancée, Princess Mehelaneh. However, the Rajah is an Englishman, and the Princess is a modern young lady. She has insisted on being brought to Britain to be presented at the local Emperor's court before her marriage to the Rajah, and he is strangely anxious to get their business over and leave the country again. The Rajah, it turns out, was once the husband of Mrs. Raikes. It was to escape his wife that he went off to the Himalayas, so he prefers to remain "dead" according to British law. The Princess, on the other hand, is not so anxious to be on her way. She has learned from Barry that in England one may choose (within reason) one's preferred spouse, and she is soon busy sizing up alternatives to her nervous Rajah.

Huntley Wright as Barry, disguised as Edna

Barry attempts to raise money for Geoffrey by selling off the worthless old tin mine to Sir Joseph on the pretext that providing work for the locals will earn his son the votes he needs to win the election. He also discovers that Madam Sophie, now living at the manor, is his old sweetheart. The Princess, who has also installed herself at the manor, has decided that her choice of husband shall be Geoffrey, whom she will bring to her native land. Geoffrey, politely kissing the Princess's hand, declines the oriental match. Marjorie, who has seen only the kiss, tearfully goes back to London and the stage.

Act II - Interior of the Ministry of Fine Arts.

At the London house of Lord Anchester, an old friend of the Rajah, a ball is being held. Attending is Nan, the Rajah, accompanied by the Princess (desperately avoiding his widowed wife and longing for the happy land of Bhong), Sophie, still under the social protection of Mrs. Raikes who clearly hasn't yet paid her dressmaker's bill, and Marjorie Joy in her London persona as Miss Montague. Geoffrey is fascinated by her, as he finds in her an amazing resemblance to his lost sweetheart. Barry is disguised as an old lady to get in past the doorman. Amusing complications ensue, including Sir Joseph's attempts to flirt with the disguised Barry, who seeks refuge in the arms of the surprised Rajah.

In the hearing of Miss Montague, Geoffrey squarely refuses the Princess's renewed offer in favour of the love of his 'little country girl'. When Lord Anchester requests the actress to favour the company with a song, she reveals her double identity to a grateful Geoffrey. All pair off happily.

== Musical numbers ==
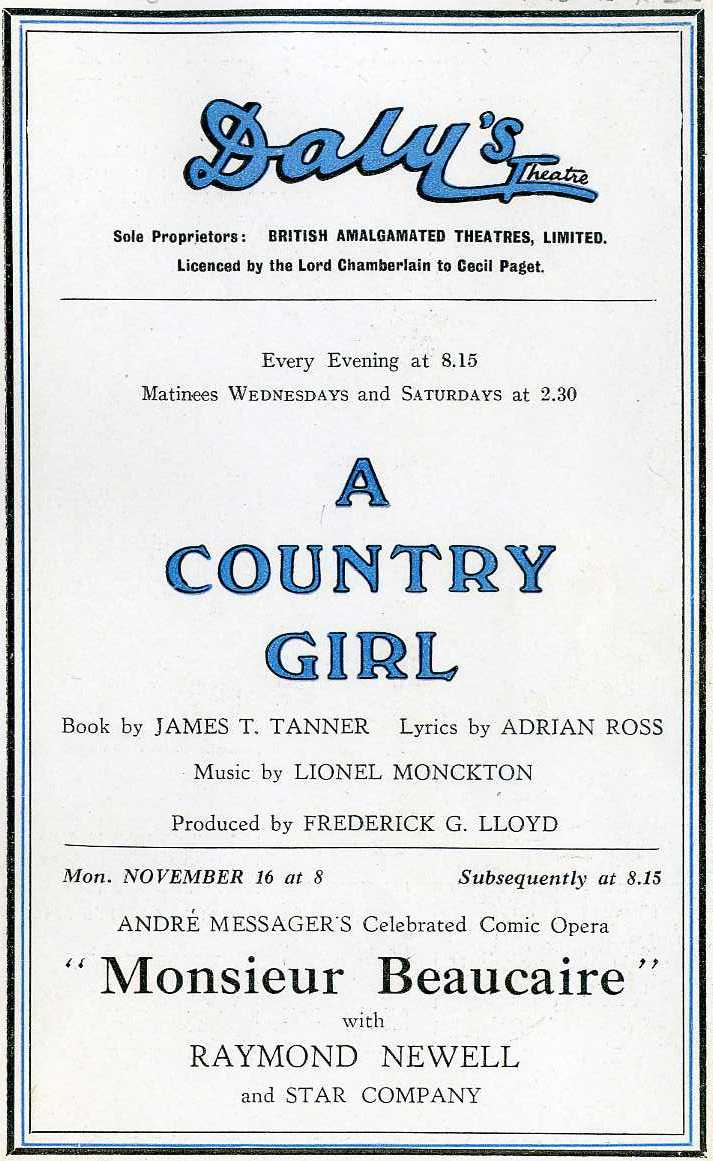
A programme from a 1931 revival starring Dorothy Ward

Act I

- No. 1 - Chorus & Mummery - "When the birds begin to sing, out we go a-harvestin."
- No. 2 - Nan & Chorus - "Johnnie came from London Town for a bit of fun"
- No. 3 - Marjorie - "Over the hills and far away, borne on the summer breeze"
- No. 4 - Geoffrey & Chorus - "A sailor's life's the life I trow, he works now late, now early"
- No. 5 - Barry & Chorus - "I went to sea as a bold A. B., and I thought when I got on board"
- No. 6 - Marjorie & Geoffrey - "When we were children, going through meadows after mowing"
- No. 7 - Chorus & Scene - Rajah & Princess - "Here he comes, here he comes! In his Eastern glory"
- No. 8 - Nan & Chorus - "Oh, Molly was tall and fair to see, her manners were frank, her language free"
- No. 9 - Chorus - "Come and see them, only see! Never did anyone look so funny!"
- No. 10 - Barry & Sophie - "Two little chicks lived in a farmyard, happy as chicks can be"
- No. 11 - Princess - "Over the mountain passes, under the peaks of snow"
- No. 12 - Finale Act I - "Hurrah! for the squire, our gallant young squire, head of the house that was head of the shire"

Act II

- No. 13 - Chorus - "From 1795 to 1799, Republican France would dress for a dance in fashions extremely fine."
- No. 14 - Sophie & Chorus - "I'm quite the most attractive of all the girls, they say"
- No. 15 - Rajah, Geoffrey, Marjorie, Nan & others - "We are invited everywhere by people we can't say No to"
- No. 16 - Barry - "Mrs. Brown's a wonder, she's fifty-six or more"
- No. 17 - Barry & Chorus - "Oh! a sailor loves a chance of a partner at a dance, when his ship comes into port"
- No. 18 - Marjorie - "An actress smiles and an actress sighs, an actress hopes and fears or cries"
- No. 19 - Geoffrey - "Time passes slowly by, my little Girlie"
- No. 20 - Nan & Chorus - "Oh, London girls are all so haughty, proud, and chilly"
- No. 21 - Rajah & Chorus - "When once I was given to dances, no doubt I committed some faults"
- No. 22 - Sophie & Barry - "You're a very funny man!" "Oh! really? You're a very curious girl!"
- No. 23 - Finale Act II - "Yo-ho! little girls, yo-ho! That's so, little girls, that's so"

Addenda

- No. 24 - Nan & Chorus - "The world was not for pain, not for remorse; but though we strive in vain"
- No. 25 - Marjorie, Nan, Sophie, Rajah, Douglas & Grassmere - "When rushing round the whirl of parties"
- No. 26 - Geoffrey, with Marjorie - "Dear little maid, I can recall her clearly"
- No. 27 - Rajah & Chorus - "When I've quitted my wfe for a bachelor life in a pastoral Eastern dominion"
- No. 28 - Barry & Chorus - "You women nowadays are a mass of affectation"
- No. 29 - Nan - "Down along the valley by the willows and the stream"
- No. 30 - Nan - "I'm just a simple country girl and looking so well and hearty"
- No. 31 - Princess - "Some girls weep when a love goes by; What care I?"
- No. 32 - Geoffrey & Chorus - "Tommy Atkins is a chap that is useful in a scrap"
