= Topsy Sinden =

English dancer, actress and singer

Topsy Sinden in costume for A Country Girl, 1902

Harriet Augusta Sinden (1877–1950), known professionally as Topsy Sinden, was an English dancer, actress and singer. She was best known for her performances in Edwardian musical comedy and pantomime, both in London and on tour. Sinden was an accomplished tap dancer and skirt dancer.

== Life and career ==
Sinden was born in St Pancras, London. According to the 1901 census, her parents were Augustus Sinden, a musician, and his wife Harriet. Her brother was the actor and dancer Bert Sinden (1879–1911). Her nickname was "Topsy" from an early age. She was a distant cousin of the actor Sir Donald Sinden.

=== Early career ===
Sinden began to perform as a small child in entertainments at St. James's Hall and made her professional debut at age six, in 1884, as a little dancer in a fairy play at the Royalty Theatre, followed shortly by a pantomime of Dick Whittington at the Theatre Royal, Drury Lane and by engagements at other West End theatres. She studied dance with M. Leprez, an Italian dancing master, and then the Viennese dancer Katti Lanner. She was given early roles including as principal dancer at age 10 in a revival of Pepita at Toole's Theatre and The Old Guard, both in 1888. In 1889, she played the title role in a pantomime of Cinderella at Covent Garden Theatre. She then was engaged by Augustus Harris as principal dancer at the Empire Theatre for three years and later played in Liverpool and elsewhere. While at the Empire she appeared in the ballet The Paris Exhibition (1889), dancing a Lancashire clog dance.

She also joined the company of George Edwardes where, in the early 1890s, she appeared in the burlesques Cinder Ellen up too Late and Don Juan. Also at the Gaiety, Edwards cast her in In Town (1892), and, in 1894, still aged 16, she danced in A Gaiety Girl at Daly's Theatre and then played the role of Violet Deveney in Edwardes's hit Edwardian musical comedy, The Shop Girl, at the Gaiety. At the invitation of Harris, Sinden then danced in grand operas at Covent Garden until his death in 1896. In 1897, she was principal dancer in The Yashmak at Shaftesbury Theatre and was also dancing at the Avenue Theatre opposite Lottie Venne. In 1899, with Edwardes's company at Daly's Theatre, she played Trixie in San Toy, in which she "contributes a graceful dance". She also performed in music hall and pantomime (usually as "principal girl") during these years, including at the Britannia Theatre, the Metropole Theatre in Camberwell, and elsewhere.

=== Later years ===
In the new century, Sinden was Miss Carruthers in A Country Girl at Daly's in 1902, was principal dancer in The Cingalee in 1904–05, played the princess in The Princess and the Troubador (with music by Walter Slaughter) at the London Coliseum in 1905 and created the role of Jane in The Beauty of Bath at the Aldwych Theatre, 1906. In 1907–08 she became the première danseuse for the ballets at the Empire Theatre, appearing first as Stella Dare in a revised version of C. Wilhelm's ballet divertissement, The Belle of the Ball, in the role created by the departing Adeline Genée. The Times found her promising. Describing her performance in this role, one of her contemporaries wrote that Sinden "excelled in a light and easy kind of tap-dancing ... and in skirt dancing, which was very popular in the musical comedies of the period."

In 1910, Sinden was performing in variety at the Palladium Theatre. The Times called her "a dream of colour and grace". In 1912, she was a featured dancer in the comic opera The Grass Widows at the Apollo Theatre. By 1914, Sinden was in financial distress, and a fund was being raised for her after she suffered an injury on stage in Liverpool, to which Adeline Genée donated the money raised for her own farewell season. In 1927, after some years away from the stage, she appeared in a production of Dick Whittington at the Elephant and Castle Theatre, south London. She continued working until at least 1930.
