= The Critic (opera) =

1915 opera by Charles Villiers Stanford

The Critic, Op. 144 (1915), is an opera by Charles Villiers Stanford. It is based on the play The Critic by Richard Brinsley Sheridan.
