= A Runaway Girl =

Edwardian musical comedy by Seymour Hicks and Harry Nicholls

Theatre poster

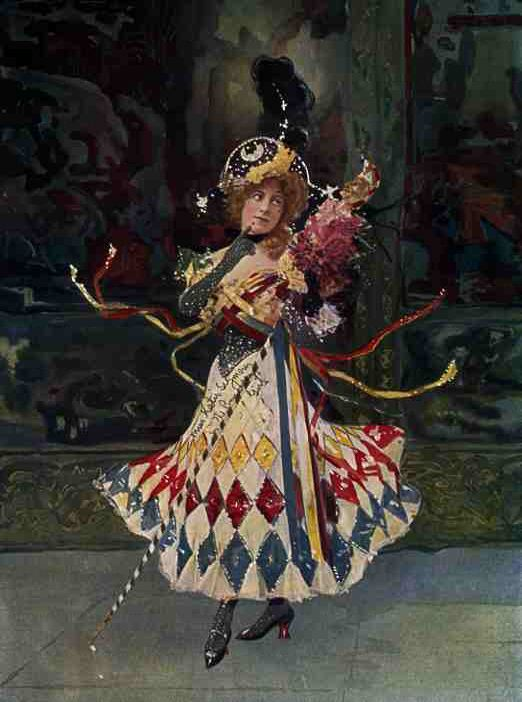
Katie Seymour as Alice

A Runaway Girl is an Edwardian musical comedy in two acts written in 1898 by Seymour Hicks and Harry Nicholls. The composer was Ivan Caryll, with additional music by Lionel Monckton and lyrics by Aubrey Hopwood and Harry Greenbank. It was produced by George Edwardes at the Gaiety Theatre, London, opening on 21 May 1898 and ran for a very successful 593 performances. It starred Hicks's wife, Ellaline Terriss and the comic actor Edmund Payne.

The work had stiff competition in London in 1898, as other successful musical comedy openings included A Greek Slave and The Belle of New York. A Runway Girl ran at Daly's Theatre in New York City in 1898 and again in 1900. Marie Celeste portrayed Winifred Grey in the 1900 Broadway cast.

The story concerns an Englishwoman who joins a group of musicians in Italy who are really bandits. It is set in Corsica and Venice.

== Roles ==
- Brother Tamarind (A Lay Brother of St Pierre) – Harry Monkhouse
- Guy Stanley (Lord Coodle's Nephew) – W. Louis Bradfield
- Lord Coodle (A Tea House Keeper) – Fred Kaye
- Signor Paloni (Consul at Corsica) – Robert Nainby
- Mr. Creel (An Entomologist) – Willie Warde
- Sir William Hake (A Cook's Tourist) – Fred Wright
- Leonello (Head of a Wandering Troupe of Musicians) – John Coates
- Pietro Pascara (Also of the Troupe) – Edward O'Niell
- Flipper (A Jockey) – Edmund Payne
- Alice (Lady Coodle's Maid) – Katie Seymour
- Dorothy Stanley – Ethel Hayden (replaced by Grace Palotta)
- Carmenita (A Street Musician) – Connie Ediss
- Lady Coodle – M. Talbot
- Fraulein Ehrenbreitstein Von Der Höhe (A Cook's Tourist) – Grace Palotta
- Winifred Grey (An Orphan) – Ellaline Terriss

== Musical numbers ==
Act I

- No. 1 - Opening Chorus and scene - "Breathe soft, wind of the South..."
- No. 2 - Winifred and Chorus - "The Sly Cigarette."
- No. 3 - Leonello and Chorus - "Sea-girt land of my home..."
- No. 4 - Chorus - "Hark, the Convent Bell is ringing..."
- No. 5 - Opening Chorus and scene - "Bright and blue our sunny skies..."
- No. 6 - Guy and Chorus - "There are girls of every station..."
- No. 7 - Winifred and Chorus - "I'm only a poor little singing girl..."
- No. 8 - Winifred and Guy - "Of all the maids I've ever seen..."
- No. 9 - Concerted Piece and dance - "The Man from Cook's."
- No. 10 - Carmenita and Tamarind - "We've left Barcelona society..."
- No. 11 - Finale: Act I - "To Venice."

Act II

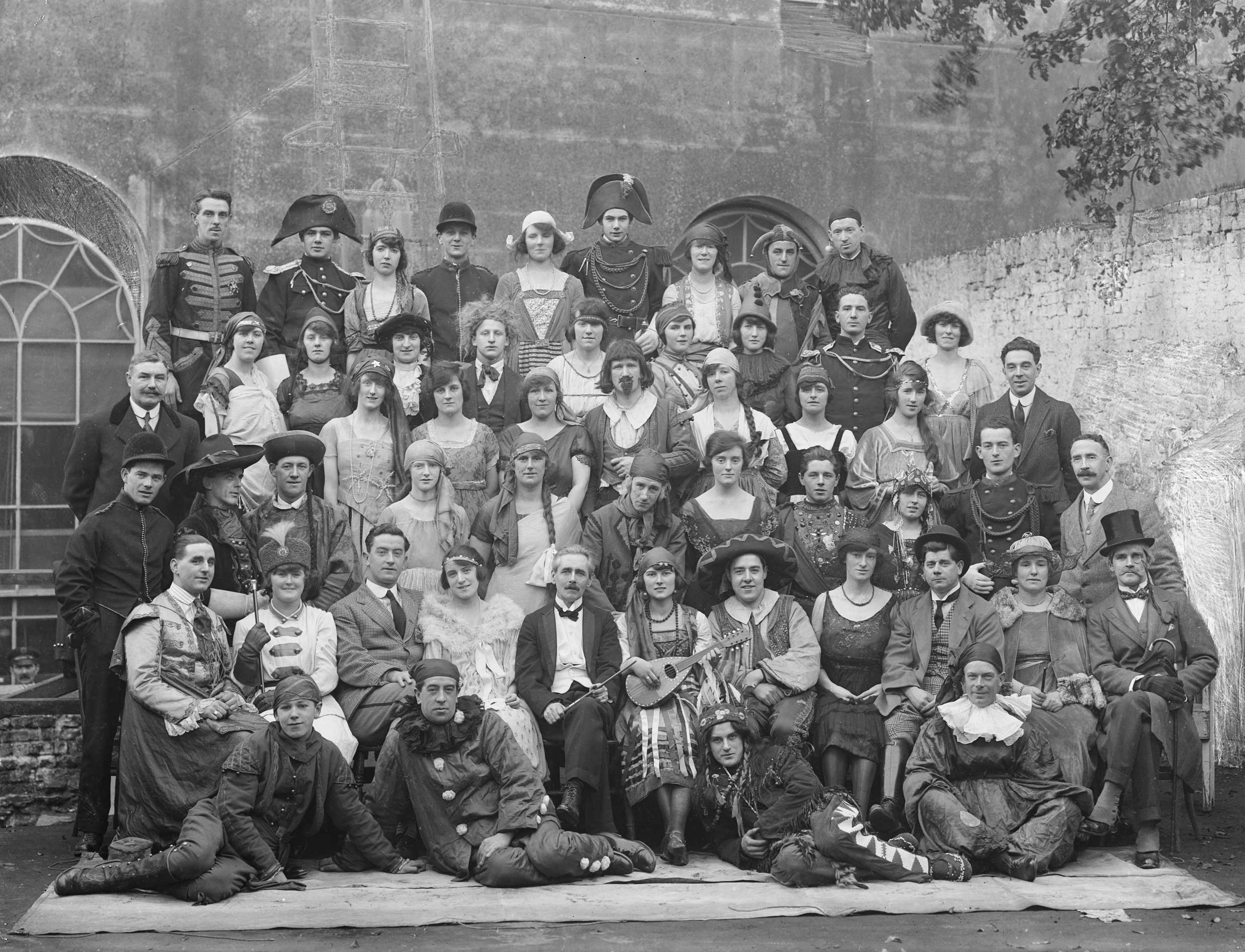
Cast of a 1921 production in Ireland

- No. 12 - Opening Chorus and Scene - "In Venice when fêtes are swinging..."
- No. 13 - Winifred, Guy and Flipper - "We have left pursuit behind us..."
- No. 14 - Hake and Chorus - "When you're out on the spree..."
- No. 15 - Dorothy and Chorus - "Soldiers in the Park."
- No. 16 - Winifred and Chorus - "The lazy town is dreaming..."
- No. 17 - Carnival Chorus - "Welcome to the Water Fête..."
- No. 17a - Leonello and Chorus - "Comrades all! Come, see the sight..."
- No. 18 - Winifred and Chorus - "There was once a little boy..."
- No. 19 - Alice and Flipper - "When de twilight's fallin'..."
- No. 20 - Carmenita and Chorus - "Though my family's pedigree..."
- No. 21 - Finale: Act II - "I'm only a poor little singing girl..." and "Soldiers in the Park."
- Addendum 1 - Winifred and Chorus - "When the little pigs begin to fly..."
- Addendum 2 - Carmenita and Chorus - "I thought it my duty to say so."
- Addendum 3 - Winifred and Chorus - "Merry little gipsy maid." (marked as "No. 4.")
- Addendum 4 - Carmenita and Chorus - "Pussy Jumps." (2 verses only)
