= In Town =

Musical comedy composed by F. Osmond Carr, with words by Adrian Ross and James T. Tanner

In Town is a musical comedy written by Adrian Ross and James T. Tanner, with music by F. Osmond Carr and lyrics by Ross. The plot of In Town, though thin, is a smart tale of backstage and society intrigue. One of the popular songs from the show was "The Man About Town".

The piece was first produced by George Edwardes and debuted with success in 1892, playing in New York in 1897. It was one of the first Edwardian musical comedies, lighter than a Gilbert and Sullivan-style comic opera, but more coherent in construction than a Victorian burlesque. The piece initiated Edwardes's famous series of modern-dress musical shows at the Gaiety Theatre that led ladies' clothing fashions throughout Britain and, unlike burlesque, attracted female audience interest. After In Town, the Edwardian musical comedies dominated the musical stage in Britain until the 1920s.

== History ==
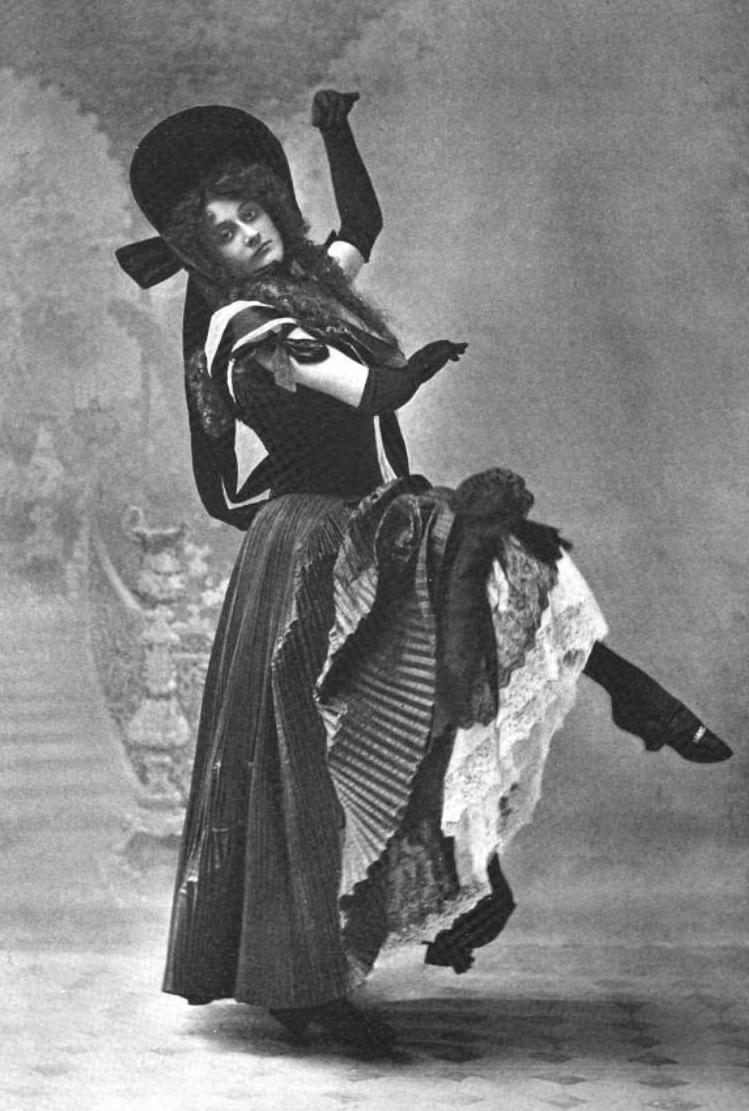
Lottie Williams in the 1897 London revival

In Town was first produced by George Edwardes at the Prince of Wales Theatre, opening on 15 October 1892, and transferred to the Gaiety Theatre on 26 December 1892, running for a successful 292 performances. It starred Arthur Roberts, together with Edmund Payne, Eric Lewis, and singing star Florence St John. Topsy Sinden danced in the piece. The musical had a revival in London at the Garrick Theatre in August 1897, before moving to Broadway, for a run of 40 performances, opening on 6 September 1897 at the Knickerbocker Theatre, starring W. Louis Bradfield as Arthur Coddington and Marie Studholme as Kitty.

In Town was one of the first Edwardian musical comedies on the London stage. It was lighter than a Gilbert and Sullivan style comic opera, but more coherent in construction than a burlesque. The piece initiated Tanner's and Edwardes's famous series of modern-dress musical shows and helped set the new fashion for the series of Gaiety Theatre musical hits that followed. Many of the best-known London couturiers began to design costumes for stage productions by the 1880s. The illustrated periodicals were eager to publish photographs of the actresses in the latest stage hits, and so the theatre became an excellent way for clothiers to publicise their latest fashions. The show was described in the Sunday Times as "a curious medley of song, dance, and nonsense, with occasional didactic glimmers, sentimental intrusions, and the very vaguest attempts at satirizing the modern masher about town."

After In Town, the Edwardian musical comedies would dominate the musical stage in Britain, and contribute to musical theatre throughout the English-speaking world and beyond, until the 1920s.

== Synopsis ==
Captain Coddington, a penniless lad-about-town, gives a young aristocrat friend, Lord Clanside, a tour of the slightly naughty lifestyles both high and low, to be found in London. Coddington invites all the ladies of the Ambiguity Theatre to lunch; Clanside agrees to pay the bill if he is invited to the party. Afterwards, with several uninvited guests, they visit the theatre to see a rehearsal. Coddington romances the prima donna of the theatre and wins her.

== Roles and original cast ==
The original cast was as follows:

- Captain Arthur Coddington – Arthur Roberts
- The Duke of Duffshire – Eric Lewis
- Lord Clanside – Phyllis Broughton
- The Rev. Samuel Hopkins – E. Bantock
- Benoll – H. Grattan
- Shrimp – Jessie Rogers
- Duchess of Duffshire – Maria Davis
- Flo Fanshawe – Sylvia Gray
- Kitty Hetherton – Florence St. John
