= W. Louis Bradfield =

English actor and singer

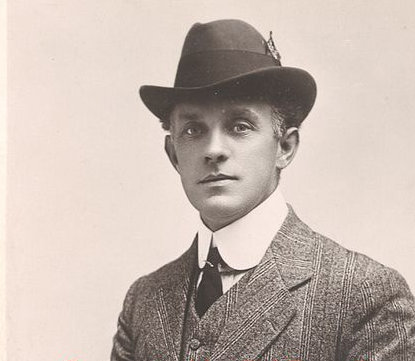
- W. Louis Bradfield, c. 1910
- Born: Walter Louis Bradfield; 13 June 1866; London, England
- Died: 12 August 1919 (aged 53); Brighton, Sussex, England
- Occupations: Actor and singer
- Years active: 1889–1918
- Spouse: Jessie B. Best (m. 1888)

Walter Louis Bradfield (13 June 1866 – 12 August 1919), was an English actor and singer who starred in Edwardian musical comedy and other theatrical works.

== Biography ==
The son of William Bradfield, a civil servant, Bradfield was born on 13 June 1866, educated at the Grocers' School, Hackney, and first appeared on stage in 1889 in a pantomime at the Theatre Royal, Nottingham. In 1888, before taking up the theatrical life, he had married Jessie B. Best.

Bradfield's notable roles include playing the leading man, Captain Coddington, in the Broadway production of the musical comedy In Town, which opened in New York in 1897, in which Bradfield played a hard-up army officer who takes all the actresses of the Ambiguity Theatre out to lunch and marries one of them.

His other stage engagements in leading roles, most of them in London's West End, included A Gaiety Girl (1893–1894), as Bobbie Rivers; The Geisha (1896), as Dick Cunningham; The Girl from Kays (1902–1903), as Harry Gordon; The Little Michus (1905–1906); and The Merveilleuses (1906–1907), as Lagorille, the Incroyable.

On 4 September 1905 Bradfield played in a one-day cricket match at Lord's, representing "The Actors" against "The Jockeys". He scored six runs and was bowled by Chaloner.

In 1908 The Actors' Birthday Book said of Bradfield -

A right merry operatic jester is W. Louis Bradfield, and the London public is so enamored of his comicalities that he is never allowed to stay very far from the British capital... first becoming a London favorite in 1893, appearing at the Gaiety in The Gaiety Girl and In Town.

He died at Brighton on 12 August 1919.
