= Modern dress =

Term used in theatre and film

Modern dress is a term used in theatre and film to refer to productions of plays from the past in which the setting is updated to the present day (or at least to a more recent time period), but the text is left relatively unchanged. For example, Baz Luhrmann's film Romeo + Juliet uses a relatively unaltered text of Shakespeare's play but updates the setting to contemporary America.

The earliest dated modern dress Shakespeare performances were produced by Barry Jackson at the Birmingham Repertory Theatre in Birmingham, England from 1923. The production of Cymbeline that opened in Birmingham in April of that year "bewildered" critics, leading to what Jackson called "a national and worldwide controversy".
