= C. Hayden Coffin =

English actor and singer (1862–1935)

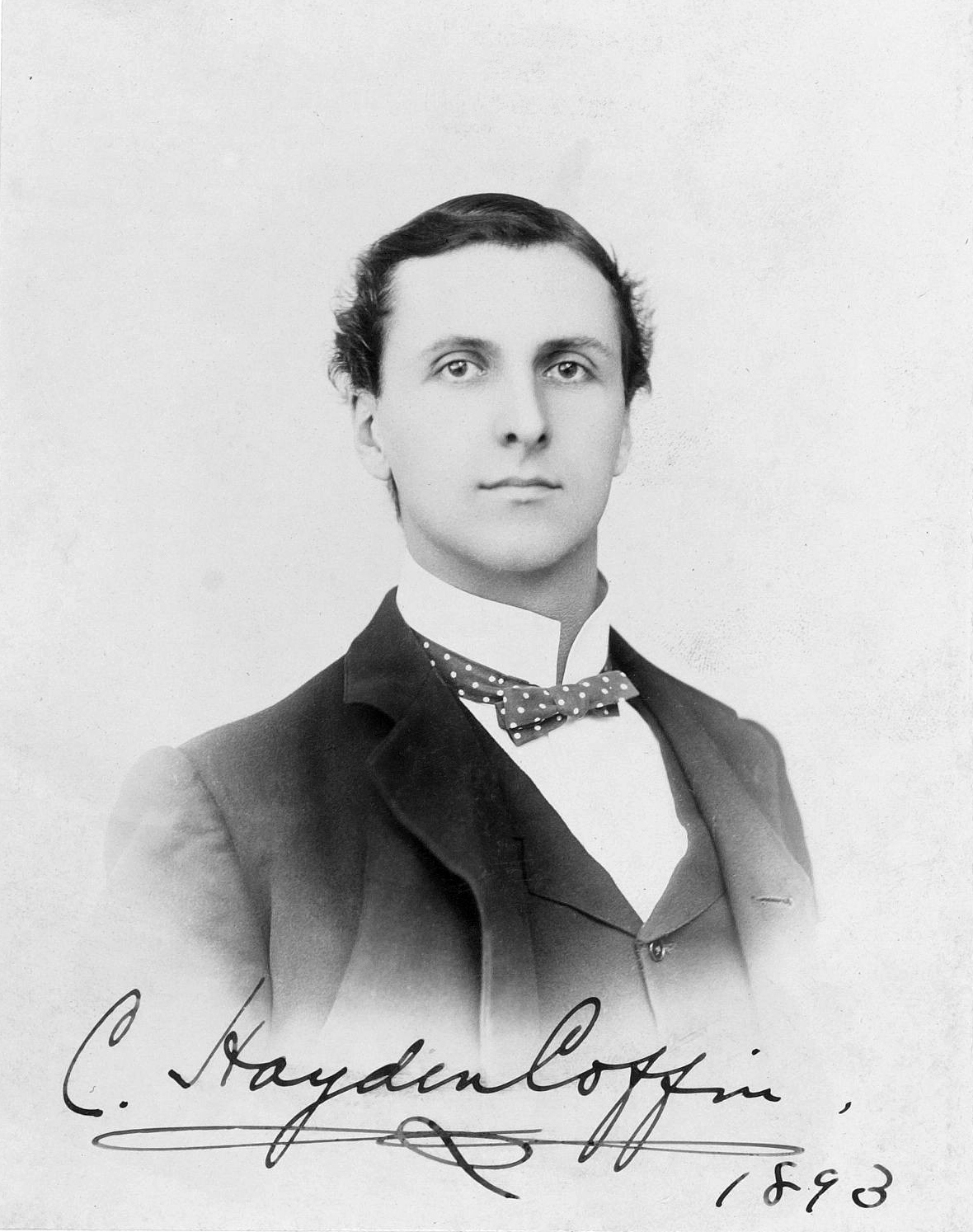
C. Hayden Coffin portrait, 1893

Charles Hayden Coffin (22 April 1862 – 8 December 1935) was an English actor and singer known for his performances in many famous Edwardian musical comedies, particularly those produced by George Edwardes.

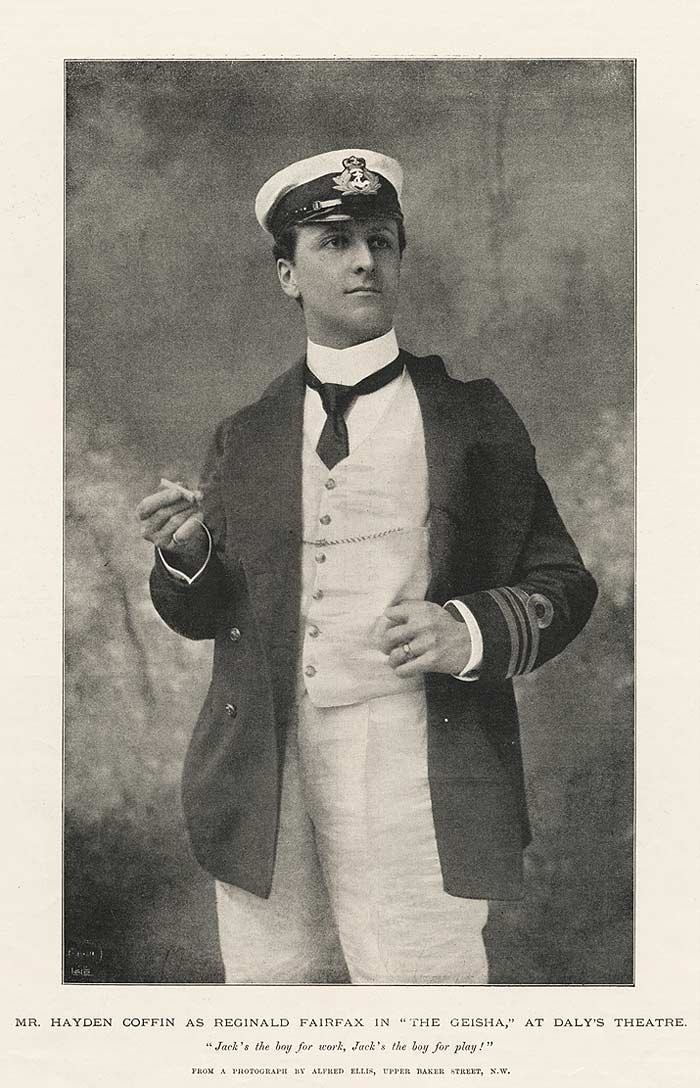
Coffin in The Geisha

Hayden achieved fame as Harry Sherwood in Dorothy (1886), which became the longest-running piece of musical theatre in history up to that time; other similar roles followed. In 1893, he joined the company of George Edwardes and starred in a series of extraordinarily successful musical comedies, including A Gaiety Girl (1893), An Artist's Model (1895), The Geisha (1896), A Greek Slave (1898), San Toy (1899), A Country Girl (1903), Veronique (1904), The Girl Behind the Counter (1906), Tom Jones (1907) and The Quaker Girl (1910).

In his later years, Coffin found success in Shakespearean roles such as Feste in Twelfth Night (1912), and in musicals, a few films and other works, such as the classic comedy The School for Scandal (1929).

== Early life ==
Coffin was born in Manchester. His parents were from Maine in the U.S., and his father, Charles Reuel Coffin (1822–1890), was a dentist. His mother was Sarah Powell (née Munsey) Coffin (1831–1913).

His foundation schooling was at University College, London where he was captain of the school for the whole of his final year. Coffin passed the preliminary examinations to enter the College of Surgeons, but decided instead to become a singer. He studied under Edith Abell from Boston and was a member of the Royal Choral Society for three years led by Joseph Barnby.

== Career ==
In 1883, he performed as an amateur at St. George's Hall in London as Tom Gilroy in H. J. Byron's Partners for Life and as Vivid in Monsieur Jacques.

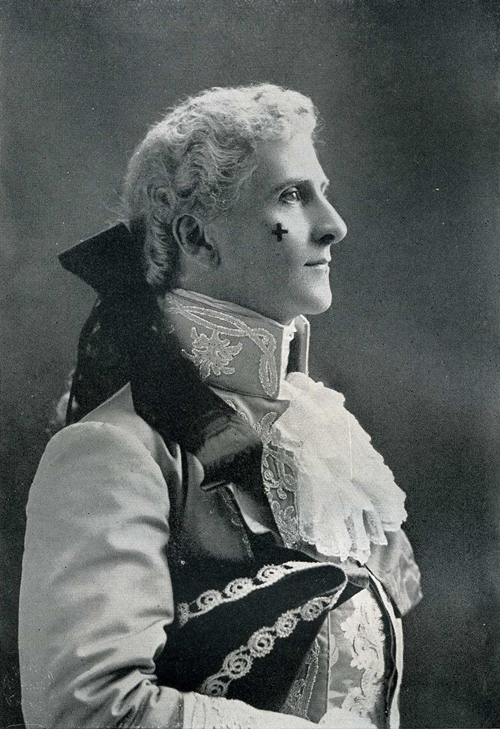
Coffin in Dorothy

Coffin made his professional stage debut as John Smith in Edward Solomon and Sydney Grundy's Pocahontas (1885). He then played in Lady of the Locket (1885), by William Fullerton Jr. and Henry Hamilton, which was the first production designed by his friend Percy Anderson, and Coriolon in Lily of Leoville by Ivan Caryll (1886). Coffin rose to fame as Harry Sherwood in Alfred Cellier and B. C. Stephenson's record-setting hit Dorothy (1886), in which he introduced the popular song, "Queen of My Heart." Coffin's good looks and powerful voice made him one of the most popular stage baritones of the late 19th and early 20th centuries. Early in his career, he also had successes with the same team's Doris (1889), Solomon and Henry Pottinger Stephens' The Red Hussar (1889, as Sir Harry Leighton), F. C. Burnand's adaptation of Edmond Audran's La Cigale (1890), and Captain Therese (1890), among others. He spent the 1892–93 season in New York City co-starring in several productions with soprano Lillian Russell. He also starred in a number of pantomimes.

Coffin returned to London in 1893 to star in a series of hit Edwardian musical comedies produced by George Edwardes and composed by Sidney Jones and then Lionel Monckton. His roles in these included Charles Goldfield in A Gaiety Girl (1893), Rudolph Blair in An Artist's Model (1895), Reginald Fairfax in The Geisha (1896), Diomed in A Greek Slave (1898), Captain Bobby Preston in San Toy (1899), Geoffrey Challoner in A Country Girl (1903) and Harry Vereker in The Cingalee (1904). He also starred in Veronique (1904), as Charlie Chetwynd in The Girl Behind the Counter (1906) and in the title role in Tom Jones (1907). Coffin had a brief London run and tour in Two Merry Monarchs (1910) as Prince Charmis and then played Captain Charteris in another hit, The Quaker Girl (1910).

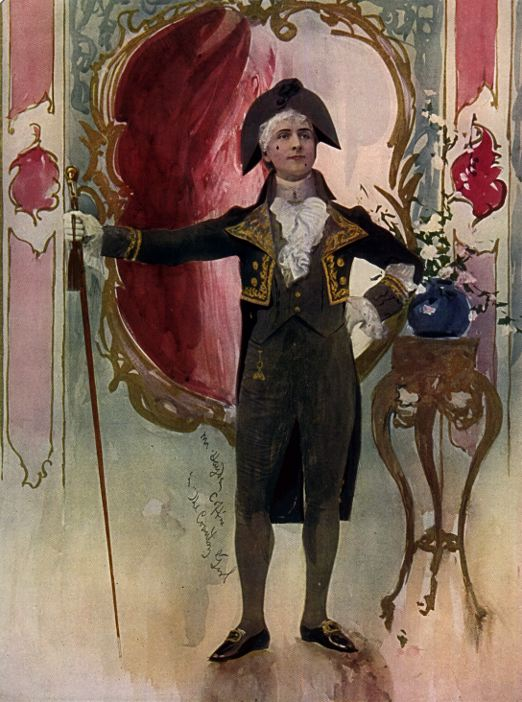
Drawing of Coffin in A Country Girl

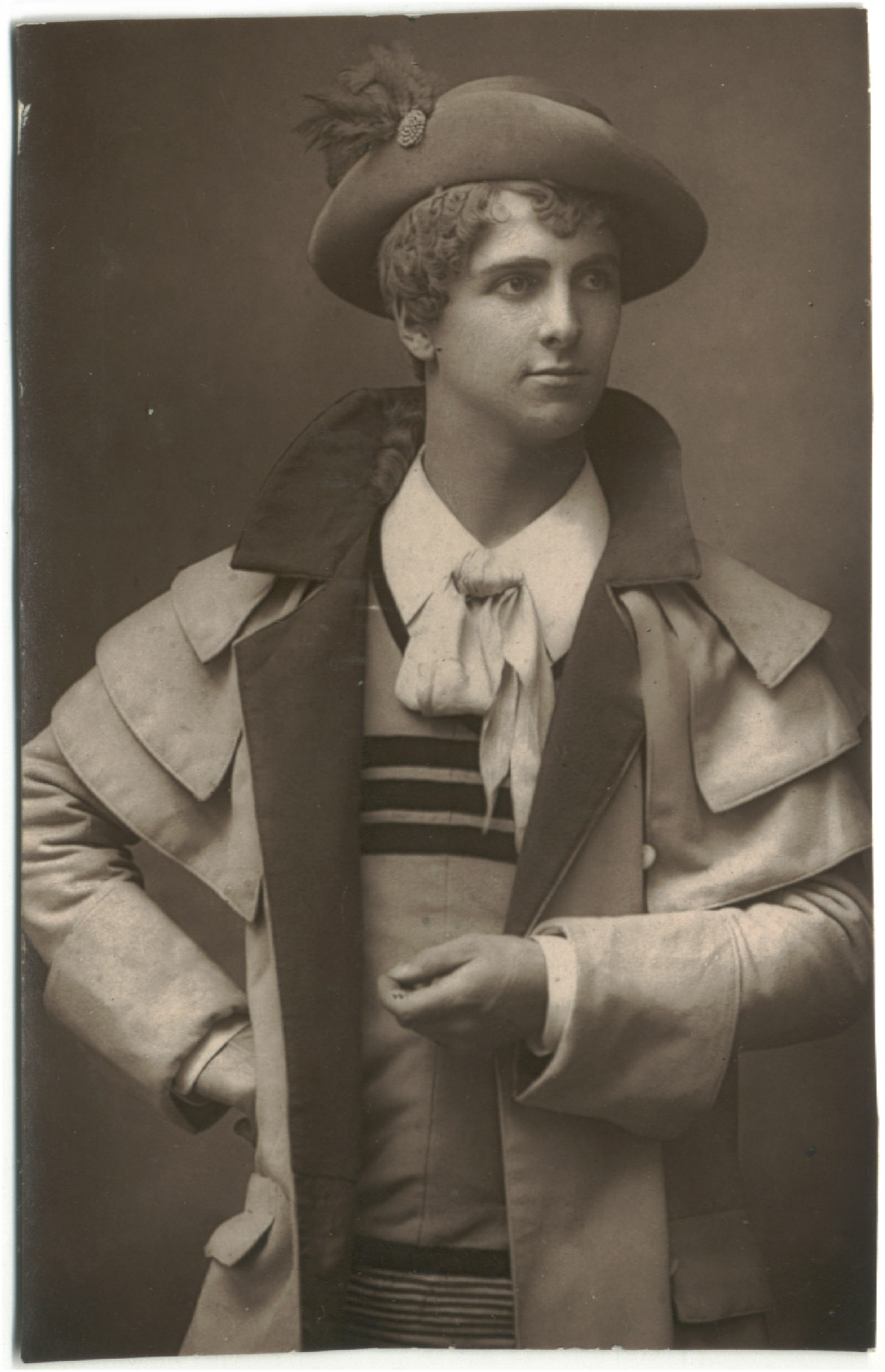
1887 portrait

In his later years, Coffin turned to serious drama, including Shakespearean roles, such as Feste in Twelfth Night at the Savoy Theatre in 1912. He also made occasional appearances in musicals such as Young England (1916) and in Charles B. Cochran's revue As You Were (1918), which ran for a year. He made several films until 1930, including It's Always the Woman (1916), and also continued touring through the 1920s. In 1929, he played Sir Harry Bumper in The School for Scandal at the Kingsway Theatre, repeating the role in the 1930 film adaptation.

== Personal life ==
Coffin was first engaged to the songwriter Hope Temple but married actress Adeline de Leuw. De Leuw had been divorced by her first husband, the composer Alberto Randegger, on the grounds of her adultery with Coffin. Coffin had an older brother, Walter, and a long affair with Maud ("Mamie") Ella Cohn Christie (1877–1966), which produced two children: Crystal (b. 1914) and Errol (b. 1918) Hayden Christie.

Coffin died in Kensington, London, at the age of 73 and was buried in a plot containing his mother and the ashes of his father on 11 December 1935 at St John the Baptist, Woking, Surrey.

== Recordings ==
Coffin made a small number of records for the Gramophone Company, as follows:

- 4-2834 When travelling days are over Young England (Hubert Bath) c. 1916, 10", coupled on E35. (speed 81)
- 2-4385 Young Fresh England Young England (Hubert Bath) in ensemble, 10", coupled on E 35.
- 02714 Who sings of England? Young England (G. H. Clutsam), 1916–17, 12", coupled on D200.
