= The Cingalee =

- or Sunny Ceylon
- Wright (Chambhuddy) and Leigh (Peggy)
- Music: Lionel Monckton; Paul Rubens
- Lyrics: Adrian Ross; Percy Greenbank
- Book: James T. Tanner
- Productions: 1904 West End; 1904 Broadway

The Cingalee or Sunny Ceylon is an Edwardian musical comedy in two acts by James T. Tanner, with music by Lionel Monckton, lyrics by Adrian Ross and Percy Greenbank, and additional material by Paul Rubens. The story is set in the Edwardian era in the then-tranquil island of Ceylon (modern-day Sri Lanka) and follows the story of British colonial tea planters (one of the most popular songs in the score is called "Tea, tea, tea").

The piece opened at Daly's Theatre in London, managed by George Edwardes, on 5 March 1904 and ran until 11 March 1905 for a total of 365 performances. The setting in an exotic Asian locale followed the precedent set by The Mikado that was continued in The Geisha, San Toy, The Nautch Girl, A Chinese Honeymoon and others. There is little in the music to give The Cingalee an Eastern flavour. However, Monckton's catchy sextet, "The Island of Gay Ceylon", his "Pearl of Sweet Ceylon" and Ruben's "White and Brown Girl", "Sloe Eyes", "Monkeys" and "You and I" are highlights of the musical score. The London cast included Hayden Coffin, Rutland Barrington, Huntley Wright and Isabel Jay. A young Lily Elsie also appeared in the show, as did Topsy Sinden.

The musical had a short Broadway run, opening at Daly's Theatre in New York on 24 October 1904, and running for 33 performances. A production in Sydney, Australia, in May 1905 by J C Williamson's Royal Comic Opera Company, opened on 6 May, starring Margaret Thomas as Nanoya.

== Plot ==
A tea plantation in Ceylon has been purchased by a young Englishman, Harry Vereker, who falls in love with Nanoya, one of his Cingalese workers, and proposes marriage. Unbeknownst to him, however, she was married at the age of four to the potentate of Boobhamba, a noble of Kandy; she is also the former owner of the plantation. To escape from this marriage to the hated despot, she has disguised herself. An unethical lawyer, Chambuddy Ram, had persuaded Harry to buy the plantation.

Sir Peter Loftus, the High Commissioner of Ceylon, accuses Ram of hiding Nanoya and of stealing a famous black pearl belonging to Boobhamba, and he orders Ram to return both within 24 hours to avoid dire consequences. Ram had given the pearl to Lady Patricia Vane. Peggy Sabine, a governess, subsequently won the pearl from Patricia in London as a bridge stake. Harry has now purchased the pearl from Peggy as a gift for Nanoya, and Ram hands them both over to Sir Peter and Boobhamba.

At his moonlit palace, Boobhamba identifies the members of his harem by dressing each wife in a different colour. Because he has a nearly complete rainbow of wifely colours, he has room for only one more wife. At a lucky moment, he finds one that he prefers to Nanoya, so she is freed from her obligation to fulfill her childhood marriage and can marry Harry.

== Roles and original cast ==
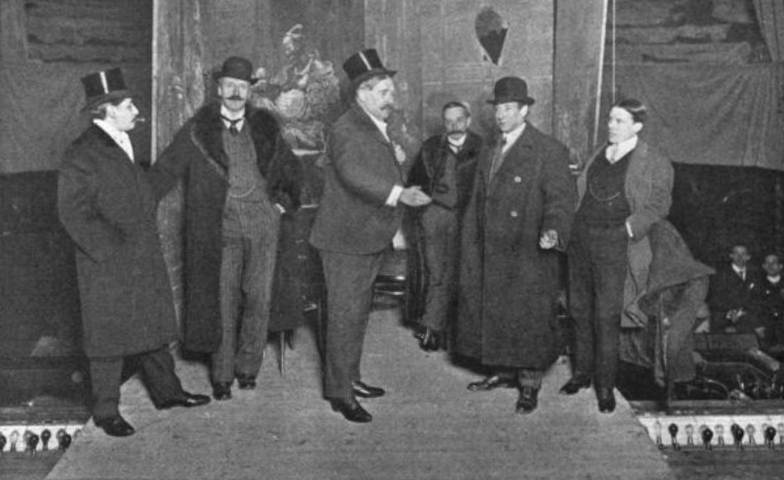
(In hats, left to right) Tanner, Monckton, Edwardes and Warde at a rehearsal (1904)

- Harry Vereker (A Tea Planter) – C. Hayden Coffin
- Boobhamba (A Noble of Kandy) – Rutland Barrington
- Sir Peter Loftus (High Commissioner and Judge, Ceylon) – Fred Kaye
- Myamgah (An Indian Servant) – Willie Warde
- Bobby Warren, Dick Bosanquet, Freddie Lowther, Jack Clinton, Willie Wilson (Pupils of Vereker on the Tea Plantation) – Henry J. Ford, Conway Dixon, Arthur Hope, Archie Anderson, J. Boddy
- Captain of The Guard – Norman Greene
- Attendant – F. J. Blackman
- Chambhuddy Ram (A Baboo Lawyer) – Huntley Wright
- Nanoya (A Cingalese Girl) – Sybil Arundale
- Peggy Sabine – Gracie Leigh
- Naitooma, Sattambi, Mychellah, Coorowe (Four Tea Girls on Vereker's Plantation) – Carrie Moore, Alice D'Orme, Freda Vivian, Doris Severn
- Angy Loftus (Sir Peter's Daughter) – Doris Stocker
- Miss Pinkerton, Fräulein Weiner, Mademoiselle Chic, Signorina Tasso (Angy's Governesses) – Nina Sevening, Mary Fraser, Mabel Hirst, Joan Keddie
- Lady Patricia Vane – Isabel Jay

== Synopsis ==
Act I – Henry Vereker's Tea Plantation, "Karagama," Ceylon

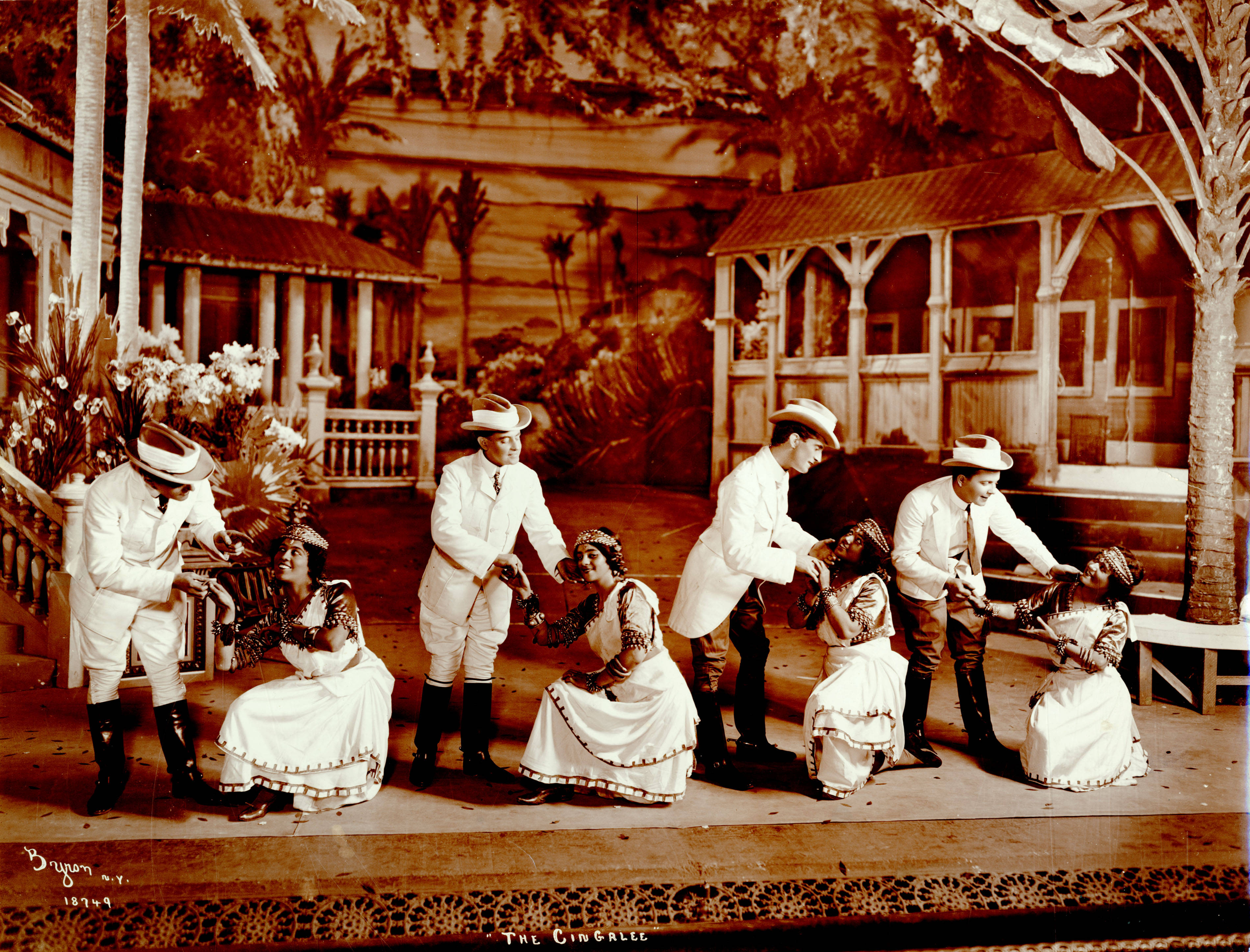
A scene from Act I of The Cingalee, Seattle, 1907

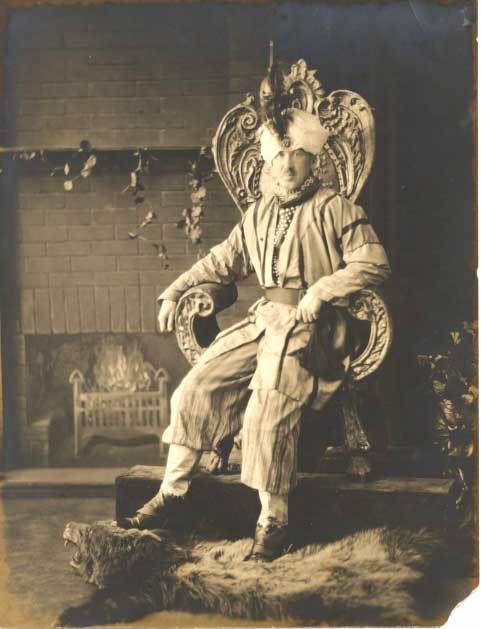
Freddy Rowan in a production at the Regina Theatre, Saskatchewan (1925)

Seventeen year old Nanoya is a Cingalese girl who had been betrothed at the age of four to the potentate of Boobhamba as one of his many wives, each dressed in a different colour to prevent mistakes and consequent jealousy. To avoid this fate, she had absconded and gone to work on a tea plantation belonging to Harry Vereker (but which has been fraudulently leased to him by a rascally lawyer, Chambuddy Ram). Harry falls in love with Nanoya and wishes to marry her. Chambuddy has also expropriated a famous black pearl that formerly sat in the forehead of a great idol. It has found its way to London and, after a convoluted set of adventures, Harry buys it to adorn his intended. Prince Boobhamba appeals to the British High Commissioner against Chambuddy, who is ordered to produce both Nanoya and the pearl within 24 hours. By chance he learns the true identity of Nanoya, and she is handed over, together with the pearl, to the Court.

Act II – Boobhamba's Palace by the Lake of Kandy

Harry, his mentor Lady Patricia Vane, Nanoya's "teacher of deportment" Peggy Sabine and Chambuddy, to bolster his own position, all seek to rescue Nanoya from her fate, to inevitable failure. Boobhamba then capriciously decides to marry Peggy Sabine instead, but she has words to say about that, and Chambuddy, in love with Peggy himself, wordily backs her up. So Harry pairs off with Nanoya, Chambuddy pairs off with Peggy and Boobhamba is left with his existing harem.

== Musical numbers ==
Act I – Vereker's Tea Plantation, "Karagama," Ceylon

- 1. Opening Chorus – "Sleepy Ceylon."
- 2. Octet: Tea Girls and Pupils – "Girls on a tea plantation..."
- 3. Vereker – "Beyond the bar of fair Manaar..."
- 4. Nanoya and Vereker – "Little girl to school must go..."
- 5. Chorus and Scene – "What on earth is that?"
- 6. March, Chorus and Song, Boobhamba – "Hail the noble deeply venerated..."
- 7. Chambhuddy – "Some years ago when a very chotah boy..."
- 8. Lady Patricia – "As you have to decide on a bride..."
- 9. Naitooma and Tea Girls – "Tea, Tea, Tea."
- 10. Peggy and Chambhuddy – "White and Brown Girl."
- 11. Sextet – "In the Island of Gay Ceylon."
- 12. Nanoya – "My Cinnamon Tree."
- 13. Finale Act I – "Have you found the girl?"

Act II – Boobhamba's Palace by the Lake of Kandy

- 14. Opening Chorus – "At the Palace of Boobhamba..."
- 15. Nanoya, Tea Girls and Chorus – "I'm a maiden merry, sorry to be sold..."
- 16. Concerted Number – "I'm afraid I do not quite understand..."
- 17. Chambhuddy – "If English Pot a rich man be..."
- 18. Vereker – "My dear little Cingalee."
- 19. Quartet – "True Love."
- 20. Naitooma and Chorus – "A Cingalese Wedding."
- 21. Chorus – "On the quiet lake the moonbeams shimmer..."
- 22. Song - Boobhamba and Chorus – "A Happy New Year."
- 23. Song - Nanoya – "You met a little girl one day..."
- 24. Duet - Peggy and Chambhuddy – "In a jungle once on a time..."
- 25. Finale Act II – "Cingalee, Cingalee..."
- Addendum: Lady Patricia – "You and I, and I and you..."

== Critical reception ==
Contemporary critics were overwhelmingly enamoured of the musical. "The Cingalee has all the elements that make for long runs. It is elaborately set and staged, charmingly dressed; the music is in Mr. Monckton's best vein, and the lyrics ... abound with graceful and well-turned lines", said The Stage. The St James's Gazette noted that the first performance was "received with rapture on Saturday night by an enthusiastic audience and played with the most admirable vivacity and smoothness by a brilliant company". In Lionel Monckton's music, The Daily Telegraph saw "a distinct leaning towards the traditions of genuine comic opera, and in this connection it is pleasant to find that what may be called the Savoy manner has served its composer as a bright answer". The Standard agreed, judging that "on the whole, this will be set down as decidedly the best of [Monckton's] scores".

Several critics commented that the second act was dramatically, if not visually, less effective than the first, although they offered different reasons, and a few papers regarded the piece ripe for pruning. The Daily News stated that "a rather long interval helped to prolong the performance until close on midnight". The Globe agreed that four hours was "a little too much" but thought "the task of condensation will be easy".

The Cingalee toured the British provinces but then was only remounted on small scales and only up to the pre-war 1940's. The condescending racial nature of the musical's libretto would be unacceptable today, and so the work is unlikely to be revived.

== Litigation ==
The Cingalee Case – Fraser v. Edwardes [1905–10] Mac. C.C., 22–27 March 1905

Captain Frederick John Fraser of the Indian Army sued George Edwardes, as producer of The Cingalee, in 1905 in King's Bench before Mr Justice Darling. Fraser had written a comic opera called Hanjiahn, or The Lotus Girl. He took this to Edwardes, who agreed to produce the opera within three years or pay a penalty of £300. Edwardes suggested that Fraser work with James T. Tanner to develop the work. Eventually, Edwardes returned the manuscript to Fraser unproduced. Tanner went on to write, and Edwardes produced, The Cingalee. Fraser sued on the basis of breach of copyright (although the matter was recorded in case law as a breach of confidence), claiming that his scenario had been used without his consent. The defence countered that the libretti were not similar, that all plays hold points in common and that, if anything, both works used The Geisha as their model. The jury found that an unfair use had indeed been made of Fraser's piece by the appropriation therefrom of characters, plot and other ideas. They assessed the damages at £3,000 plus court costs. The case was noted in the press for the amount and quality of witty repartee among witnesses, counsel and Judge.

A 1930 memoir by one of Fraser's legal team assessed that the prosecution had erred by attacking the character of an obviously honourable man and that the previously closely balanced case had been won by a legal ambush on one of the witnesses (his identity hidden in later accounts, but confirmed in contemporary newspaper accounts as the theatrical costume designer, Percy Anderson). Anderson had written a sympathetic letter in April 1904 to the plaintiff indicating that Fraser had been badly treated by Edwardes, but when called as a witness by the defence, Anderson testified in support of Edwardes. The plaintiff's counsel produced the forgotten letter in Anderson's handwriting and made the unfortunate witness read it to the court "causing some sensation". The jury, swayed by this evidence, were viewed as too generous in the damages awarded, and the defence appealed, primarily on that basis, with £2,000 being paid into court. An out of court settlement was reached for damages of this £2,000, plus costs, with all imputations by both sides being withdrawn, before the appeal could be argued.

== Recordings ==
The first modern recording of a group of numbers from The Cingalee, was made in 2003 by Theatre Bel-Etage chorus and orchestra, conductor Mart Sander.

== References and external links ==
- Vocal score
- Midi files and cast list
- Photos and Theatre Program
