= The Shop Girl =

Musical comedy by Ivan Caryll and H. J. W. Dam

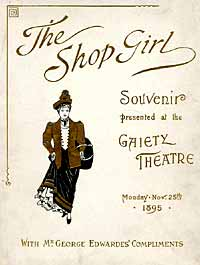
Souvenir - 1st anniversary of the opening

The Shop Girl was an Edwardian musical comedy in two acts (described by the author as a musical farce) written by Henry J. W. Dam, with lyrics by Dam and Adrian Ross and music by Ivan Caryll, and additional numbers by Lionel Monckton and Ross. It premiered at the Gaiety Theatre in London in 1894 and ran for an extremely successful 546 performances. Its cast included Seymour Hicks, George Grossmith Jr., Arthur Williams, Edmund Payne, and Ellaline Terriss. It soon played in New York and was successfully revived in London in 1920.

== Background ==
The success of A Gaiety Girl in 1893 confirmed to George Edwardes that the lighter "musical comedy" was the right path for musical theatre. The Shop Girl heralded a new era in musical comedy, and the critics were amazed at the coherent story, as there was hardly any narrative in burlesque. Over a dozen imitations followed at the Gaiety Theatre (including The Circus Girl and A Runaway Girl) over the next two decades, and the format was widely copied by other producers and playwriting teams. They also led to the next level of sophistication in integrated musical comedy at Daly's Theatre, and elsewhere in London.

== Productions ==
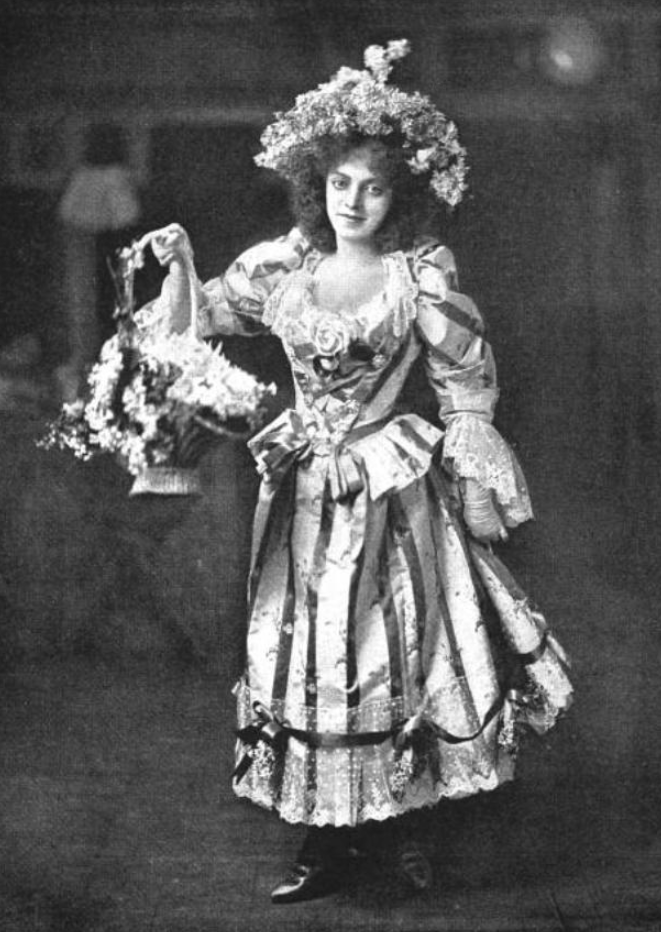
Ada Reeve as Bessie Brent

The Shop Girl was first produced by George Edwardes at the Gaiety Theatre in London, opening on 24 November 1894. The piece ran for an extremely successful 546 performances, transferring to Daly's Theatre. It starred Seymour Hicks, George Grossmith Jr., Arthur Williams, Edmund Payne, Willie Warde and Ada Reeve, who (being pregnant) was replaced in the cast by Kate Cutler and then Hicks' wife, Ellaline Terriss. Topsy Sinden danced in the piece. Direction was by James T. Tanner, with choreography by Warde. Costumes were by C. Wilhelm. The piece achieved immediate popularity and introduced to London audiences a cleaner, more respectable form of musical comedy than the previous "musical farces", which had been more closely related to burlesque. Indeed, during the run of the show, some of the racier lines were removed, as Edwardes recognised that the future of musicals lay in appealing to the respectable Victorian audience. In addition, at Hicks' urging, the romantic couple was designed as less sentimental and more mischievous and light hearted. But it was not lacking in sex appeal. It was the first show to feature Edwardes' Gaiety Girls, who were to feature in all of his similar musical comedies. Caryll, the music director at the Gaiety, conducted the performances of the piece himself. One of the most famous songs from the show was "Her golden hair was hanging down her back." As the run went on, songs were constantly changed and new business frequently introduced, especially when there were cast changes. This also began a pattern for musicals of the era.

Hicks and Grossmith transferred with the production to Broadway in 1895, under the management of Charles Frohman. Connie Ediss and Bertie Wright joined the cast. The New York production of The Shop Girl opened at Palmer's Theatre on October 28, 1895 and played for 72 performances. Hicks and Alfred Butt revived the piece in London in 1920, at the Gaiety, where it was again a hit, running for 327 performances. Hicks directed and Warde choreographed. The cast included Evelyn Laye and Roy Royston.

== Synopsis ==
An attractive and charming London shop girl, Bessie Brent, is in love with Charles Appleby, a poor, but lively medical student from a good family. She also meets a good-hearted millionaire, John Brown, who had gone out in the steerage of a liner, "to become a miner", and had struck it rich in Colorado. The millionaire has come back to London to look for the daughter of his mining chum, to whom a fortune of four million pounds was due. She is to be identified by a birthmark. The daughter, of course, turns out to be the shop girl and, after a few misunderstandings, she agrees to marry her sweetheart.

== Roles and original cast ==
George Grossmith Jr. as Bertie Boyd

- Mr. Hooley (proprietor of the Royal Stores) – Arthur Williams
- Charles Appleby (a medical student) – Seymour Hicks
- Bertie Boyd (one of the Boys) – George Grossmith Jr.
- John Brown (a millionaire) – Colin Coop
- Sir George Appleby (a solicitor) – Cairns James
- Colonel Singleton (retired) – Frank Wheeler
- Count St. Vaurien (secretary to Mr. Brown) – Robert Nainby
- Mr. Tweets (financial secretary to Lady Appleby) – Willie Warde
- Mr. Miggles (shopwalker at the Royal Stores) – Edmund Payne (Bertie Wright in New York)
- Lady Dodo Singleton (Charlie's cousin) – Marie Halton
- Miss Robinson (fitter at the Royal Stores) – Katie Seymour
- Lady Appleby (Charlie's mother, wife of Sir George) – Maria Davis
- Ada Smith (an apprentice at the Royal Stores) – Lillie Belmore (Connie Ediss in New York)
- Lady Appleby's daughters: Faith (Lillie Dickinson), Hope (Agatha Roze), and Charity (Lily Johnson)
- Of the Syndicate Theatre: Maud Plantagenet (Maude Hill; later Adelaide Astor), Eva Tudor (Fannie Warde), Lillie Stuart (Maud Sutherland), Ada Harrison (Helen Lee), Mabel Beresford (Violet Monckton), Agnes Howard (Louie Coote), Maggie Jocelyn (Maggie Ripley, and Violet Deveney (Topsy Sinden)
- Bessie Brent ("The Shop Girl") – Ada Reeve (later replaced by Kate Cutler)

== Musical numbers ==
Act I – The Royal Stores.

- No. 1. Chorus - "This noble institution of financial evolution is the glory of our British trade"
- No. 2. Hooley & Bessie, with Chorus - "If you ever should engage in trade, you will never find your fortune made"
- No. 3. Sir George, Count, Hooley & Colonel - "Although I am a man of law, of many years in practice spent"
- No. 4. Chorus of Stage Beauties - "In us of course you see a charming coterie, whose fascinations all confess"
- No. 5. Charlie & Foundlings - "If without a single mark of your identity, on a hospitable doorstep you are thrown"
- No. 6. Beatrice - "When I came to the shop some years ago, I was terribly shy and simple"

Singing from the wings

- No. 7. Bessie & Charlie - "Hush-a-bye, hush-a-bye, shut your little eye, dear"
- No. 8. Beatrice & Chorus - "Over the hills and over into the sunset's glow"
- No. 9. Bertie & Foundlings - "Foundlings are we, waiting to see who will unravel our pre-natal mystery"
- No. 9a. Reprise - "Foundlings are we, waiting to see"
- No. 10. Miggles - "It was an evil hour when I met my Mary Ann, oh! woe! woe the day!"
- No. 11. Ada & Chorus - "Left upon a doorstep at half past nine"
- No. 12. Finale Act I - "Farewell, farewell, we tender our congratulations truly"

Act II – Fancy Bazaar at Kensington.

- No. 13. Chorus - "Charity, charity, charity, charity, fearless are we in a bazaar"
- No. 14. Song - "I'm a lady not unknown to fame, critics call me by my Christian name"
- No. 14a. Bessie and Chorus - "I lub a gal, 'spose she lubs me too, anyhow she say she do"
- No. 15. Miggles & Miss Robinson - "I am a Jap, please notice my cap, 'twas copied from off a tea caddy (a/k/a "Love on the Japanese Plan)
- No. 16. John Brown & Chorus - "In the steerage of a Liner I went out to be a miner"
- No. 17. Sir George, Count & Colonel - "If you can fully fathom human folly and fatuity"
- No. 18. Chorus - "We're now to have some mystery, the forecast of our history"
- No. 19. Charlie & Chorus - "There was once a country maiden came to London for a trip"
- No. 20. Lady Dodo - "The Man in the Moon is down, he is winning a great renown"
- No. 21. Bertie & Chorus - "I'm what folks call a Johnnie, of the title I am proud"
- Nos. 22 & 22a. Chorus and soloists - "The show, the show, the show, the show"
- No. 23. Finale Act II - "Now joy is in the air, their future will be fair, look'd after by this kindly desperado"
