= Edmund Payne =

English actor, comedian and singer

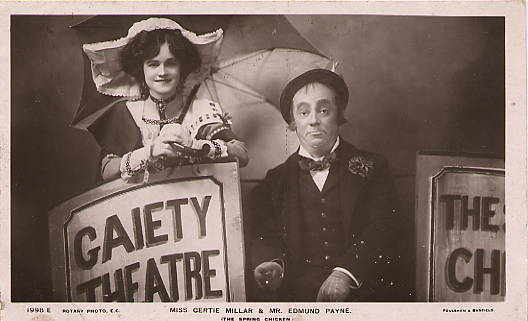
Gertie Millar and Payne in The Spring Chicken, 1905

Edmund James "Teddy" Payne (14 December 1863 – 15 July 1914), was an English actor, comedian and singer best known for creating comic roles in a series of extremely successful Edwardian musical comedies. He was often paired with the comic actor George Grossmith, Jr.

After about a decade touring and in stock productions, Payne joined the company at the Gaiety Theatre in London, gaining notice for creating a comic character in the musical In Town (1892). He spent more than two decades at the Gaiety, using his diminutive stature, malleable features, distinctive lisp and comic dance ability to his advantage. His further successes in the 1890s included lovable comic characters in such long-running shows as The Shop Girl (1894), The Circus Girl (1896) and A Runaway Girl (1898). In the new century, he created memorable characters in such hits as The Messenger Boy (1900), The Toreador (1902), The Orchid (1903), The Spring Chicken (1905), The Girls of Gottenberg (1907), Our Miss Gibbs (1909) and The Sunshine Girl (1912).

== Life and career ==
With George Grossmith, Jr., in The New Aladdin, 1906

Payne was born in Hackney, London. His father was Edmund Payne, a chair manufacturer, his mother was Eliza Payne née Ince, and he had a brother, Fred, who also became an actor. Payne made his professional stage debut as Friday in an adaptation of Robinson Crusoe at Market Harborough, in 1880. He performed in stock, toured, and joined the Milton–Rays company.

Payne first appeared in London at the Gaiety Theatre as Mephistopheles in a revival of Faust up to date. Most of Payne's subsequent career was spent at the Gaiety. He enjoyed much success for his comic turn as Shrimp, the Call Boy, in In Town (1892). He followed this with a role in Don Juan (1893) and gave a popular performance as Mr. Miggles in The Shop Girl (1894) that widened his reputation. He first shared the stage with George Grossmith, Jr. in The Shop Girl, and the two would be paired in many further productions. He created more comic roles in The Circus Girl (1896) and A Runaway Girl (1898). Payne always rehearsed in a pair of velvet shoes and rode to and from the Gaiety on a tricycle. He was popular among colleagues as well as the public. In 1903 he attempted to beat the twenty-four hour unpaced tricycle record. He passed 100 miles but shortly afterwards gave up, having encountered five hours of incessant rain.

Payne in The Toreador

Payne created roles in a string of musical comedy hits in the early years of the new century, including Tommy Bang in The Messenger Boy (1900), Sammy Gigg in The Toreador (1902), Meakin in The Orchid (1903), Mr. Girdle in The Spring Chicken (1905), Tippin in The New Aladdin (1906), Max Moddelkopf in The Girls of Gottenberg (1907), Timothy Gibbs in Our Miss Gibbs (1909), Albert Umbles in Peggy (1911), and Floot in his last show at the Gaiety, The Sunshine Girl (1912), in which he appeared until 1913. He was to have had a role in The Girl From Utah, but he fell ill and died before the show premiered.

Payne wrote to the editor of Strand Magazine on 30 May 1904, "Dear Sir / My height is five feet three & a half inches in my half hose". His diminutive stature and his elastic facial expressions, including his "pop" eyes, gained him wide fame. He was an accomplished comic singer and dancer, and a diligent actor. He also used a lisp to good effect: "It gave a perfect character to the lovable little men he always impersonated".

In 1909, Payne made a film entitled A Gaiety Duet, in which he starred with his co-writer, George Grossmith, Jr. Payne was married twice, firstly to Emily Saxon (1864–1899) whom he met in the theatre and married in 1888. They had four children, Emily, Alice, Edmund and Harry. After Saxon died in 1899, Payne married Alice Mary Wyatt in 1901. They had three children, Mary, Leslie and Nora. Payne was the great-great-grandfather of choirmaster and television presenter Gareth Malone.

Payne died in London at the age of 50 and is buried at Abney Park Cemetery. In his will he left £21,657 to his widow, Alice. A commemorative blue plaque was erected to Payne in 2017 at his last home in Hampstead by The Music Hall Guild of Great Britain and America.
