= Thelma Raye =

British actress and singer (1890–1966)

- Thelma Raye, ca. 1908
- Born: Thelma Victoria Maud Bell-Morton; 6 September 1890; Rio de Janeiro, Brazil
- Died: 29 June 1966 (aged 75); Port Macquarie, New South Wales, Australia
- Resting place: Newcastle Memorial Park, Beresfield, New South Wales, Australia
- Occupation: Actress
- Years active: c. 1905–1925
- Spouses: Percy Stewart Dawson (m. 1917; div. 1920) Ronald Colman (m. 1920; div. 1934)
- Children: 1

Thelma Victoria Maud Bell-Morton (6 September 1890 – 29 June 1966), known professionally as Thelma Raye, was a British actress, singer and model performing in musical comedies and other light entertainment. In a career of twenty years she appeared in Great Britain, the United States and in Australia, where she became Queen of the Tivoli Follies. Today she is mainly remembered as the first wife of Ronald Colman.

== Early life ==
Thelma Raye was born in Rio de Janeiro, Brazil, to Hugh Bell-Morton of Glasgow and Bertha Blanche Caucanas from France. She was the youngest sister of Alice, Laura and Elsie. Her parents were married on the 1st November 1879 at the British Consulate in Rio de Janeiro, where her father worked as representative of the Commercial Telegram Bureaux. When Hugh Bell-Morton died after landing from the SS Oravia in Liverpool, the family settled in 51, Kingsley Road, and Raye attended the nearby Girls’ High School in 171, Bedford Street. She learned to play the violin and the piano as a child and later, after moving to London, she learned singing from Francis Korbay.

== Career ==
In 1906, when she was a chorus girl at Daly's Theatre in London, George Edwardes gave Raye the chance to stand in for Denise Orme in The Little Michus. Edwardes was so pleased with her performance that she was promoted to touring lead. For the next three years, Raye appeared in half a dozen Edwardian musical comedies at Daly's and the Gaiety Theatre, of which Our Miss Gibbs (1909) was the most successful. In 1907, under Charles Frohman's management, she went to New York to play Helene in The Dairymaids at the Criterion Theatre on Broadway. Back in England, and from 1909 under the management of George Dance, she continued to perform in musical comedies, comic operas, operettas, musicals and the popular farcical comedy The Glad Eye (1912) which ran to over 400 performances. In 1910 she sang alongside the sixteen year old Ivor Novello in The Pigeon House in Cardiff. It was his first appearance on the stage.

Whizz, Whizz, Whizz music sheet with portrait of Thelma Raye, 1916

In 1915 she went to Australia with J. C. Williamson Ltd. where she played Kitty Kent in The Marriage Market at Her Majesty's Theatre, Sydney. After five plays in quick succession, including the highly popular musical comedy The Arcadians, she appeared with the Tivoli Follies from November 1915 until November 1917, the last three months as Queen of the Follies in succession to Vera Pearce. It marked the high point of her career. After the breakdown of her first marriage, Raye returned to England in 1918 where she was cast as Christina Anderson in the spy play The Live Wire, one of the few straight plays in which she performed. In the following year she was the touring lead in Scandal. In these years, too, she sat for Mortimer Menpes who depicted her as Woman holding a cigarette in a drypoint etching.

When Thelma Raye married Ronald Colman in 1920, she gave up the stage and followed him to New York. However, when her husband was touring the United States with East is West in the spring of 1922, she traveled to Adelaide to take part in the twenty-five-minute short film Why Men Go Wrong. This film, a Wondergraph production directed by Walter Hunt and photographed by Harry Krischock, which was said to show Adelaide autumn fashions, is now considered lost. Raye also had bit parts in The White Sister and Romola, the two films Colman did with Henry King and Lillian Gish in Italy. She is however nowhere to be seen and, uncharacteristically, did not mention her participation to the press.

After the separation from Colman in 1924 in Italy, Raye did not return to New York, but went to England. She tried to resume her career and had a part in the revue Cartoons in Liverpool in 1925. In 1929, James Bannister Howard (1867-1946) planned to produce The Love Game with her in London, but nothing seems to have come of it.

Throughout her career, Thelma Raye got favourable reviews. The critics praised her dainty charm and vivacity, dubbing her "the little red-headed bit of sunshine". What she lacked in voice, she made up in personality. There are very few negative reviews, the most scathing from Charles Nalder Baeyertz of the Triad. In the musical comedies, he writes, she was "dull as a deserted fowlhouse". Four weeks later he states: "Miss Thelma Raye is frankly impossible. Her voice is exceedingly poor in quality and her work is flatly uninteresting. If self-confidence and assurance were the whole equipment of the public entertainer, Miss Raye would be an artist sublimated - very artist to the nth power."

== Private life ==
=== Charles Raymond Maude ===
Thelma Raye and Charles Maude in "Bonita", 1911

In 1911, Thelma Raye played the leading part of Mariana in the musical Bonita at the Queen's Theatre, London. The male lead was Charles Raymond Maude, the husband of Nancy Price. When her daughter Dawn Beatrice Mary Bell-Morton was born in 1913, Charles Maude acknowledged paternity and provided a settlement for Dawn's care. Raye invented a dead husband and left Dawn in her mother's care most of the time. In 1930, Raye and Maude's brother-in-law, the diplomat John Duncan Gregory, issued a bankruptcy notice against Maude. When Dawn married her second husband Nathaniel Howes in 1939, Maude acted as witness. (Note: Maude later left the stage for the army and around 1920 became second-in-command to General Malcolm of the British Military Mission at Berlin, see Belfast Telegraph, 23 November 1926, p. 9. In the Sonderfahndungsliste G.B., also known as the Black Book, he is listed at no. 97, p. 132, as "Leiter d. Berl. Spionageabteil. d. engl. Mission" (head of the Berlin espionage department of the British mission).)

=== Percy Stewart Dawson ===
Among Raye's many admirers in Australia was Percy Stewart Dawson (1888-1947), the rich son and heir of David Stewart Dawson. He married her on 21 March 1917 at St. Stephen's Church, Phillip Street, Sydney. No other member of the Dawson family was present. Hugh McIntosh, the director of the Tivoli Theatres, gave the bride away, and deputy director Edmund Coville acted as best man. The couple didn't spend much time together. Seven weeks after the wedding, Dawson embarked with the army for England, from where he went to France as a gunner. In September Raye announced her intention to "take up nursing and other Red Cross work" to get to France to be "as near her husband as possible". Instead, she returned to London and to the stage.

=== Ronald Colman ===
Thelma Raye met Ronald Colman during the production of The Live Wire in the autumn of 1918. They both played the lead roles when it toured the provinces. They formed the habit of having supper together after each show, and when the tour ended, they moved together in Victoria Street, London. (Note: Sam Frank pointed out that such a cohabitation was considered scandalous at the time, Frank 1997, p. 5. As Colman went on another tour with Skittles immediately afterwards and filmed A Daughter of Eve, and Raye went to Paris and from July played the lead in Scandal in London and on tour until the next spring, they cannot have been there much at the same time.) Dawson got wind of his wife's infidelity and petitioned for divorce in December 1919, citing Colman as co-respondent. The divorce came through in the following June, and Colman and Raye married on 18 September 1920 at the Registry Office in Hanover Square, London. Again, Raye was left alone soon after the wedding. Colman, who had been saving every penny to go to America, went to New York five days later, and in February 1921 Raye followed him.

The first half year in New York was characterised by unemployment and poverty. Raye's health suffered both physically and mentally, and she became increasingly aggressive. Lillian Gish remembered that during the filming of The White Sister in Rome in 1923, "Thelma Colman ran down the hotel corridor crying: "He's dead! He's dead!" Some of the company ran in to find Ronnie on the floor. When he came to, he said, "I must have fallen and hit my head."" A bit later, at a masquerade party of the film company, she slapped Colman in the face in front of everyone. She did this again the next year while watching an opera in Rome. On 4 March 1924, during the filming of Romola things came to a head. They had been dancing at a café in Florence when they quarrelled and Colman left her on the spot. He moved into the apartment of William Powell, Charles Lane and Henry King and sent Raye a message to return to London and accept a weekly allowance. They never spoke again and only communicated through lawyers.

In February 1925, Thelma Raye went to Hollywood and filed suit for separate maintenance. While she was there, she stalked Colman, sitting near him in theatres twice, appearing unannounced on the set and checking into the Samarkand Hotel to quiz Colman's friend Al Weingand who was the assistant manager. Raye won the suit on March 24 and received a settlement of $ 25 000 in cash and bonds and a monthly allowance of $ 500 for ten years. In addition, when Colman's salary was raised shortly afterwards, she received $ 6000 with interest in weekly payments of $ 750. On 12 August 1926, Colman filed suit for divorce, claiming desertion, but this was later withdrawn. Raye filed for divorce in 1933. To provide a reason, Colman and his lawyer staged an adultery, setting Colman and Al Weingand up in a small hotel in Paris with two hired ladies for 36 hours. On 31 July 1934, Raye was granted a decree nisi in London on the ground of Colman's misconduct in Paris, which was made absolute on 18 February 1935. Despite the divorce, Raye continued to harass Colman. She checked into San Ysidro Ranch, the resort hotel Colman had bought with Al Weingand in the spring of 1935 and where he often spent the weekends. In 1939, half a year after Colman's marriage to Benita Hume, she opened Thelma's Fish Net Shoppe at 496 Coast Boulevard South (now North Pacific Coast Highway) in Laguna Beach and advertised herself as "The Original Mrs. Ronald Colman", using notepaper printed with "Mrs. Ronald Colman the First". She also threatened to write her memoirs and was said to be busy on her book as late as 1950.

Even unrelated to Colman, Thelma Raye displayed erratic behaviour. In November 1927 she was arrested in Chicago when she appropriated an unattended taxi and set it on fire by forgetting to release the handbrake.

Raye has been called a "vicious person", an "evil and vindictive woman" that was jealous of her husband's success. She appears to have been a very disturbed individual, revealing symptoms of what today might be diagnosed as histrionic personality disorder and antisocial personality disorder.

== Later years ==
After the separation from Colman in 1924, she lived in London, Paris, Italy, Switzerland and for some years in the south of France where she had a villa. Later she moved to California, had a house in Nassau in the Bahamas and around 1950 owned a villa in Capri where she spent the summer. At about the same time she settled in Port Macquarie in New South Wales, Australia, first in Flynn's Beach and then in Tacking Point.

Thelma Victoria Maud Colman died at Hastings District Hospital at Port Macquarie on 29 June 1966. She was cremated and buried two days later at Newcastle Memorial Park in Beresfield, New South Wales. Only five persons attended the funeral.

== Theatre performances ==
Season	Play Title	Theatre	Role	Notes
1906	The Little Michus	Daly's Theatre, London	Marie Blanche	Understudy for Denise Orme
1906	The Geisha	Daly's Theatre, London	O Kiku San	
1906	The Lady Dandies	Daly's Theatre, London	Illyrine	
1907	The Girls of Gottenberg	Gaiety Theatre, London	Elsa	
1907	The Dairymaids	Criterion, New York	Helene	Musical comedy by Alexander M. Thompson, Robert Courtleigh, Paul Rubens and Frank E. Tours
1908	Havana	Gaiety Theatre, London	Mamie	Musical comedy by George Grossmith Jr., Graham Hill, Adrian Ross and Leslie Stuart
1909	Mrs. Ponderbury's Past	Alexandra Theatre, London	Stella	Farcical comedy by F. C. Burnand; principal part
1909	Our Miss Gibbs	Gaiety Theatre, London	Miss Gibbs	Touring lead
1909	Aladdin	Opera House, Belfast	Princess En-Chan-Ting	annual Christmas Pantomime, principal part
1910	Dear Little Denmark	Prince of Wales Theatre, London	Christine	principal part
1910	The Pigeon House	New Theatre, Cardiff	Léontine de Merval	Musical comedy by the Earl of Yarmouth; principal part
1911	Two Merry Monarchs	tour	Princess Cynthia	
1911	Bonita	Queen's Theatre, London	Mariana	Comic opera by Walter Wadham Peacock and Harold Fraser-Simson
1912	The Glad Eye	Strand Theatre, London	Lucienne Bocard	Farcical comedy by Jose Levy, adapted from Le Zèbre by Paul Armont and Nicolas Nancey; in succession to Edyth Latimer
1912	The Grass Widows	Apollo Theatre, London	Honorka	Musical Comedy by Gustave Kerker, Arthur Anderson and Hartley Carrick
1913	Oh! Oh! Delphine	Shaftesbury Theatre, London	Simone	understudy of Iris Hoey as Delphine
1914	The Joy-Ride-Lady	New Theatre, London	Fifi du Barry	Operetta by Arthur Anderson and Hartley Carrick; principal part
1914	The Whirl of the Town	New Palace, Manchester	Dulcie Mannering	Revue by George Arthurs, Worton David, Herman Finck
1915	The Marriage Market	Her Majesty's Theatre, Melbourne, Australia	Kitty Kent	principal part
1915	The Arcadians	Her Majesty's Theatre, Sydney	Eileen Cavanagh	
1915	After the Girl	Her Majesty's Theatre, Sydney	Doris Pitt	Revusical comedy by Paul Rubens and Harry Greenbank; principal part
1915	Our Miss Gibbs	Her Majesty's Theatre, Sydney	Mary Gibbs	
1915	The Old Guard	Her Majesty's Theatre, Melbourne	Fraisette	Comic opera by Robert Planquette and Henry Brougham Farnie
1915	Go to Jericho!	Empire, Belfast		Revue by Gus Sohlke and George Arthurs
1915-1917	Tivoli Follies	Tivoli Theatres in Sydney and Melbourne		from Sept. 1917 as Queen of the Follies
1918	The Live Wire	Christina Anderson	tour	Spy play by Sydney Blow and Douglas Hoare; touring lead
1919	Scandal	Strand Theatre, London	Beatrix Hinchcliffe	Play after the novel by Cosmo Hamilton; touring lead
1923	Susette	Theatre Royal Stratford East, London	Mrs. Bust	Musical comedy revue
1924	Paradise Alley	Royal Hippodrome, Belfast		"a melange of mirth and melody" by R. P. Weston and Bert Lee
1925	Cartoons	Royal Court Theatre, Liverpool		Revue by Morris Harvey, Harold Simpson and Tom Webster
