= Augarde =

Augarde is a surname. Notable people with the surname include:

- Adrienne Augarde (1882–1913), English actress and singer
- Amy Augarde (1868–1959), English actress and singer
- Jacques Augarde (1908–2006), French politician
- Steve Augarde (born 1950), British author and artist
