= Baeyertz =

Baeyertz is a surname. Notable people with the surname include:

- Charles Nalder Baeyertz (1866–1943), Australian writer
- Emilia Baeyertz (1842–1926), Welsh evangelist, mother of Charles
