= Tivoli Follies =

The Tivoli Follies was a series of vaudeville revue programs in Australia staged between 1914 and 1917 by the J. C. Williamson's organization through their "Tivoli" chain of theatres in Sydney, Melbourne and Adelaide. The name has since been revived for shows at individual "Tivoli" theatres.

The series was conceived and initially produced by Jack Haskell and Hugh D. McIntosh, for Harry Rickards' Tivoli chain of theatres, commencing at the Tivoli Theatre, Sydney on 28 November 1914, headlined by Jack Cannot. The Tivoli Theatre, Melbourne followed, and a year later the Tivoli Theatre, Adelaide. Seasons typically opened with a "Saturday matinee" at 2:30 pm. and an evening program at 8:00 pm., repeated daily (Sundays excepted).

Artists who appeared in the "Follies" and later became famous include George Welch, Billy Rego, Verna Bain (dancer, daughter of James C. Bain), Thelma Raye, Vera Pearce, and Carmel Hakendorf.

== History ==
Sydney

- 28 November 1914 – 9 February 1915 with Isabelle D'Armond, Jack Cannot, Monte Wolf, Vera Pearce, Eileen Watson, Jean Keith etc
- 5 June – 2 July 1915; Sydney Jarvis and Virginia Dare, James E. Britt, Estelle Rose, The Tyrells, The Baltus Trio, Johnnie Fields
- 27 November – 9 February 1916; Vera Pearce, Jack Cannot, George Welch, Frank Greene, Thelma Raye, Billy Rego, Walter Weems
- 20 May – 4 July 1916; Vera Pearce, Thelma Raye, Jack Cannot, Walter Weems, George Welch, Frank Greene, Billy Rego
- 9 October – 2 December 1916; Vera Pearce, Jack Cannot, Walter Weems, George Welch, Thelma Raye, Billy Rego,
- 24 March – 11 May 1917, preceded by the Victoria Theatre, Newcastle 17 March – 23 March; Vera Pearce, Jack Cannot, George Welch, Thelma Raye, Daisy and Sydney Yates, Billy Rego

Melbourne

- 18 February – 23 April 1915; J. W. Rickaby, Isabelle D'Armond, Jack Cannot, Vera Pearce, Monty Wolf
- 18 September – 19 November 1915; Jack Cannot, Vera Pearce, George Welch, Walter Weems, Alexander Yakovlenko, Frank Greene
- 12 February – 29 April 1916; Jack Cannot, Vera Pearce, George Welch, Thelma Raye, Walter Weems, Billy Rego, Frank Greene, Brussels Concert Co, Peggy Peate, Jean Keith
- 16 September – 6 October 1916; Vera Pearce, Thelma Raye; Jack Cannot, Walter Weems, George Welch, Billy Rego, Peggy Peate, Jean Keith
- 16 December 1916 – 2 February 1917, followed by several one-night performances at Her Majesty's Theatre, Ballarat and Geelong Theatre.
- 12 September – 1 November 1917; Harry Roxbury, Alice Rennetto, Ruth Budd, Joe Reed

Adelaide

- 1–10 May 1915
- 28 August – 11 September 1915
- 6–13 May 1916
- 17–24 February 1917: This program clashed with a very popular season at the Tivoli by the William Anderson Comedy Company, leading the "Follies" and Anderson managements to advertise against each other.

== Later uses ==
The name "Tivoli Follies" was resurrected in

- 6 September – ?? October 1930 at the Tivoli Theatre, Melbourne. Among its performers was a young Robert Helpman.
- 3 and 5 September 1932 at the Maitland Town Hall
- 3 and 5 October 1936 at the newly opened Tivoli Theatre, Broken Hill.
