= Mabel Green =

British actress

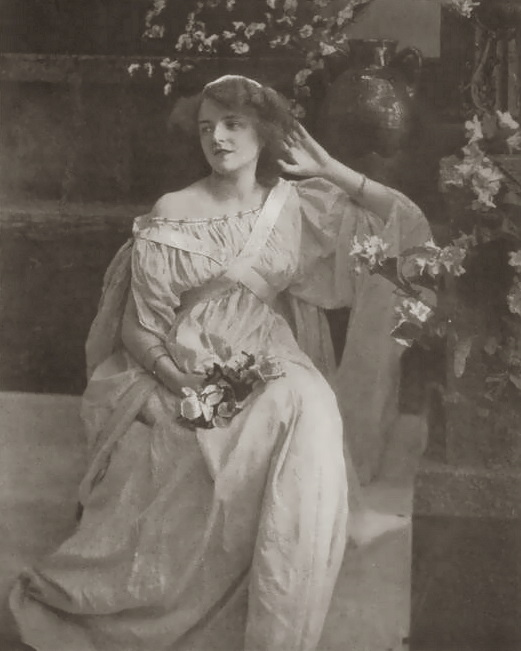
- Mabel Green pictured in May 1905
- Born: Mabel Gladys Coomber; 1 November 1887; Notting Hill, London
- Died: 29 November 1975 (aged 88)

Mabel Green (1 November 1887 – 29 November 1975), born Mabel Gladys Coomber, was a British actress.

== Early life ==
Mabel Gladys Coomber was born in Notting Hill, London, the daughter of Alfred Coomber and Matilda (Maud) Tanner Coomber.

== Career ==
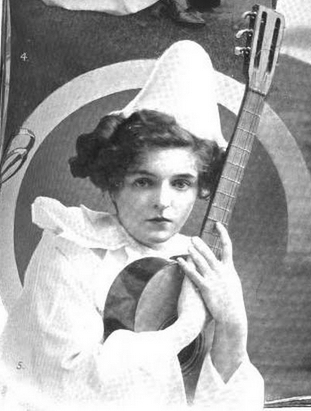
Mabel Green, from a 1907 publication

Mabel Green first came to attention in the English adaptation of André Messager's The Little Michus (1905), with Adrienne Augarde; the reviewer in The Observer found Green and Augarde's performances "refreshing," "singing and acting as they did with a girlish abandon and an absence of effort." Later stage appearances came for Green in The Dairymaids (1907), The Florentine Tragedy (1909), The Balkan Princess (1910), and in pantomimes Cinderella (1920–1921), Tom, Tom, the Piper's Son (1921–1922), and The Co-optimists (1924). She was popular as a subject of postcard photographs and other memorabilia.

In 1911 Green sang at the Tivoli music hall. Her performances there were not so well-received as her other work, with the Guardian reviewer commenting that "Mabel Green has a nice, sweet voice, a pretty smile, and some other qualities, but you cannot feel that there is any meaning in the gentle sentiments she sings about."

Green was an early motoring enthusiast, posing for photographs with her REO Landaulette in 1907.

== Personal life ==
Mabel Green married three times. Her first husband was Tom Stanley Steel; they married in South Africa in 1912. They divorced in 1917. Her second husband was Prussian-born Julius Sigismund Wetzlar, deputy chairman of the Anglo American Corporation of South Africa. He died in 1938. Her third husband was Zante Gower Burmester; they married in 1940. He died in 1971. She died in 1975, aged 88 years.
