= Jack Haskell (producer) =

American choreographer (1886–1963)

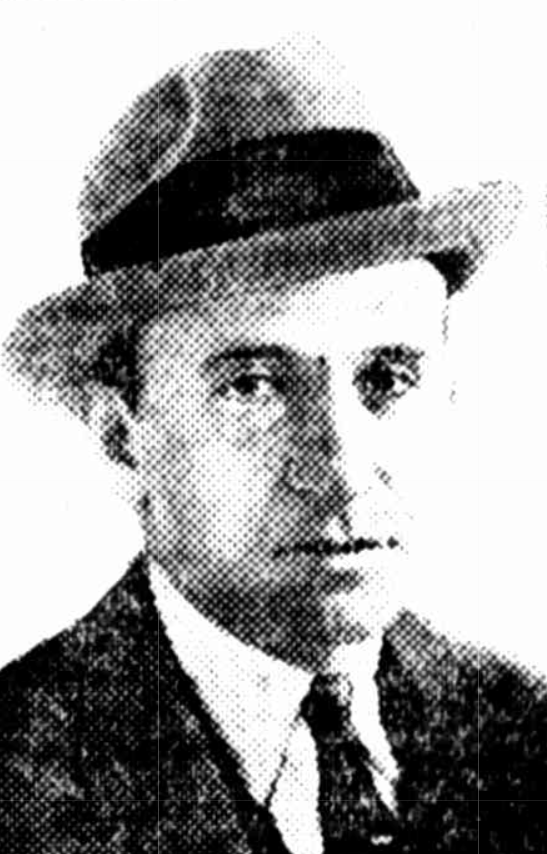
Jack Haskell in 1920

Jack Haskell (13 April 1886 – April 1963) was an American theatrical producer who specialised in revue and later a dance director in Hollywood. Much of his early work was for J. C. Williamson's (JCW) in Australia.

== Biography ==
=== London ===
In London Haskell produced

- La Petite Cabaret, reckoned to have been the first revue, staged at the Palace Theatre, London, in April 1912. He also staged a cabaret at London's exclusive nightclub Ciro's.

=== Australia ===
Haskell came to Australia from England, From 1914 he was associated with Hugh D. McIntosh in producing revues for JCW.

- Tivoli Follies November 1914 – May 1915, launched by Jack Cannot
- The Bing Boys Are Here at Her Majesty's, Sydney from December 1917
- Oh, Boy! at Her Majesty's, Melbourne from 6 July 1918. Dances by Minnie Everett.
- Hello Everybody in 1918–1919.

In January 1919 he left for London via America after 15 months' residence in Australia. He was busy while in London, producing the revue Round the World in Eighty Days, the musical comedy Nobody's Boy, Midnight Frolic, and Oh, Joy (known in Australia as Oh, Boy). He assisted Oscar Asche in producing Eastward Ho! at the Alhambra, and rehearsed a touring company of Gay Bohemia, and Joyland at the London Hippodrome.

He was back in Australia in December 1919, and began work on Kissing Time with Gladys Moncrieff for JCW, which opened on 31 January 1920. Minnie Everett was dance arranger.

- Bing Boys on Broadway followed, then
- The Passing Show of 1920 on 6 March.

He left for America and the Continent June—October On his return he produced

- Baby Bunting musical at the Criterion Theatre, Sydney on 24 December 1920. Dances by Minnie Hooper.

=== London again ===
In April 1921 he left Australia for America and Great Britain, and again was involved in stage productions in London such as Sally for George Grossmith and his sometime partner Captain "Pat" Malone.

=== Hollywood ===
In 1930 he was in Hollywood at Warner Bros., where he was employed as a dance producer under Darryl F. Zanuck and five years later was dance director for Poor Little Rich Girl.
