= The Triad (magazine) =

Australian magazine (1915–1927)

The Triad was a high quality monthly magazine published in Australia 1915–1927. It served as an independent intellectual review of arts, biography and current events. Its contributors include Hugh McCrae, Kenneth Slessor, "Furnley Maurice", Ethel Anderson, Randolph Bedford, Will Lawson, Mary Gilmore, Louis Esson, Cecil Mann, and "Quinton Davis".

== History ==
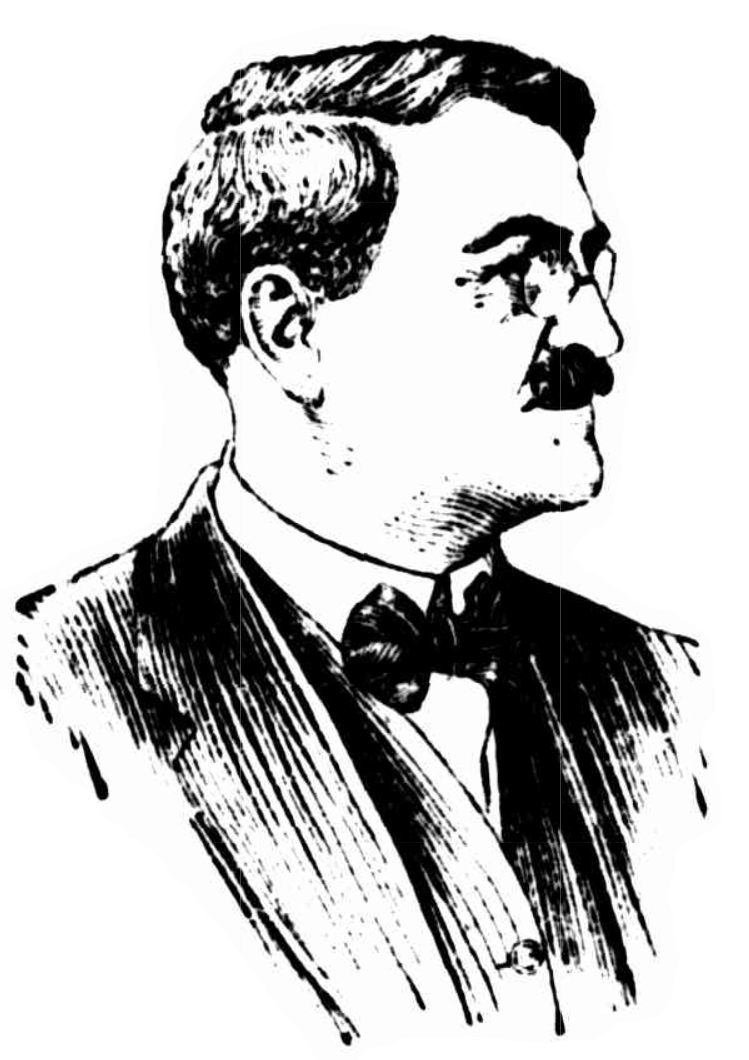
Baeyertz in 1923

The Triad was founded in New Zealand sometime around 1892 by Charles Nalder Baeyertz (often "Bayertz") as a magazine of music and culture, and enjoyed limited circulation in Australia. In June 1914 Baeyerts settled in Sydney, and began arranging for his magazine to be published in Australia. He founded a limited liability company to take over its production; Baeyeritz was employed as managing director and editor. The first Australian edition appeared in October 1915.

Baeyertz, who was born and educated in Australia, was a Licentiate of Music and well known as a South Street Society eisteddfod adjudicator. By 1918 Frank Morton was associated with The Triad and its self-imposed goal of purifying the English language as it is spoken in Dunedin and Sydney. Both men supported the conscription referendum.

In 1923 The Triad Magazine of Australia Ltd was formed by Baeyertz and half-a-dozen subscribers with offices in Wigram House, 19 Castlereagh St., Sydney.

Frank Morton wrote for Triad from around 1913, conducting its sections under a variety of pseudonyms, and was its most prolific and most highly regarded contributor, reckoned by some its editor. He died on 15 December 1923. Problems never come singly: a fortnight later all his material for the January number was lost in a fire. The February number was instead made a "bumper" issue in his memory.

In 1925 Baeyertz took on L. L. Woolacott (c. 1880 – ) (Note: Leslie Lovel Woolacott, journalist of Parsley Bay, was an accomplished musician and had some success as a dramatist supplying many for Gregan McMahon's repertory company.) as co-editor. The magazine continued to gain encomiums on account of the presentation of the magazine – its paper, printing and binding – in addition to the quality and variety of its contents: the May 1925 issue included pieces by John Galsworthy and Australian expatriate Dale Collins.

Baeyertz disposed of his interest in the business around 1926, and the magazine floundered.

Syd Smith and Leon Gellert (of Art in Australia) salvaged the business, excising the magazine's "young people" pages to create Cobbers, a junior fortnightly version of The Triad, with artwork by Reg Coulter and Pixie O. Harris. They brought in Ernest Watt, as guarantor.

In 1927 Triad was purchased by Ernest Watt and co-edited by Watt and Hugh McCrae, a gentler, less "superior" production, more like the old Baeyertzian Triad. Watt, a son of J. B. Watt, left Australia a year later, in his absence appointing W. Robson (a former general manager of the Daily Telegraph) editor, and giving McRae more freedom to contribute to the magazine.

With Watt on board the Mooltan, sailing for London, Robson denied he had any intention in keeping The Triad afloat, and allowed it to cease functioning.

Consolidated Publications Company Ltd purchased the rights of Triad magazine, and used aspects of the old magazine for its new publication Sydney Opinion.
