= Ciro's (London) =

Nightclub in London, branch of chain

Coordinates: 51.510°N 0.130°W

Ciro's, often written Ciros, was an exclusive nightclub in Orange Street, Leicester Square, London, "just behind the National Gallery". It was famously closed during WWI for serving alcohol illegally. A fashionable club of the same name later opened at the same location.

== Club and restaurant chain ==
The Ciro’s restaurant chain had branches in Monte Carlo, Paris, London and Biarritz.

In 1897, Ciro, an Italian-born Egyptian headwaiter, in Monte Carlo, opened his first restaurant within the fashionable narrow radius of a hundred yards around the square, fronting the casino, on the Galerie Charles III, next to his former place of employment.

The name Ciro's comes from Italian-born Egyptian Ciro Capozzi who founded the first Ciro's bar in Monaco around 1892, next to the café Riche in the newly built Galerie Charles III. According to the story of James Gordon Bennett Jr., having a difference about a table on the terrasse, he bought the café Riche and gave it to Ciro who named it the Ciro's. In 1911, Ciro Capozzi sold the name to an English consortium (including William Poulett, 7th Earl Poulett as main investor, and Clément Hobson) who open the Deauville Ciro's (still existing as a restaurant belonging to the Groupe Lucien Barrière), the Paris Ciro's in 1912, and the London one in 1915. Ciro's became a European high society restaurant chain with branches in Monte Carlo, Paris, London (where Audrey Hepburn danced before her film career), and Deauville. Bartender Harry MacElhone, famous for Harry's New York Bar, first worked at Ciro's in London after World War I.

In 1911, Ciro sold to an English Syndicate headed by Lord Poulett and Clement Hobson with M.Rizzi as general manager.

"Ciro's was a hip London establishment (before another popular one opened up in Los Angeles in 1940), that had as their bartender Harry McElhone (author of ABC of Cocktails), at which Jimmy took over when Harry went off to Paris. ..." (Ross Bolton)

"Louis Adlon, grandson of the proprietor of Berlin’s Hotel Adlon opened Hollywood’s first iteration of Ciro’s in 1934 (with Erich Alexander and George Sorel) Located on Hollywood Boulevard, the club was informally part of a chain with locations in London, Paris and Berlin. The Hollywood Ciro’s was not a success, apparently, because it soon folded."

== London ==
In May 1915, Ciro’s London branch opened, as a private club, in Orange Street, near the back of the National Gallery.

The producer Jack Haskell staged a cabaret there around 1917, and said that an evening's entertainment at Ciro's would cost at least £10/10. (Note: If Haskell was referring to 1916 prices, £10/10 would be equivalent to around £800 in 2025.)

The club came to public attention in 1916 when it lost its licence after a police raid at 11 pm on Sunday 19 November 1916. It was proved they were serving jugs of champagne (sold as "special ginger beer") after hours, and to non-members. This was in the depths of the War, when butter was rationed and petrol unobtainable. A workers' newspaper commented:

... if that's the way to win the war, and denotes a burning enthusiasm, the Tory press is right; Australia hasn't been doing her best, for she has scarcely got past beer by the jugful.

The two managers were each fined £125 (equivalent to £9,401 in 2025) and three directors were fined £25 (equivalent to £1,880 in 2025) each, with costs.

In 1936 two rival bandleaders, Ambrose and Jack Harris (previously of the Embassy Club, Grosvenor House Hotel, Cafe de Paris, London Casino), took a financial stake in the club in an effort to keep it going.

== Chicago ==
Related but not owned by: Ciro's Grill Franco-American, 18 W. Walton Place, Chicago, IL.
