= John J. Hollister Jr. =

American politician

John James Hollister Jr.
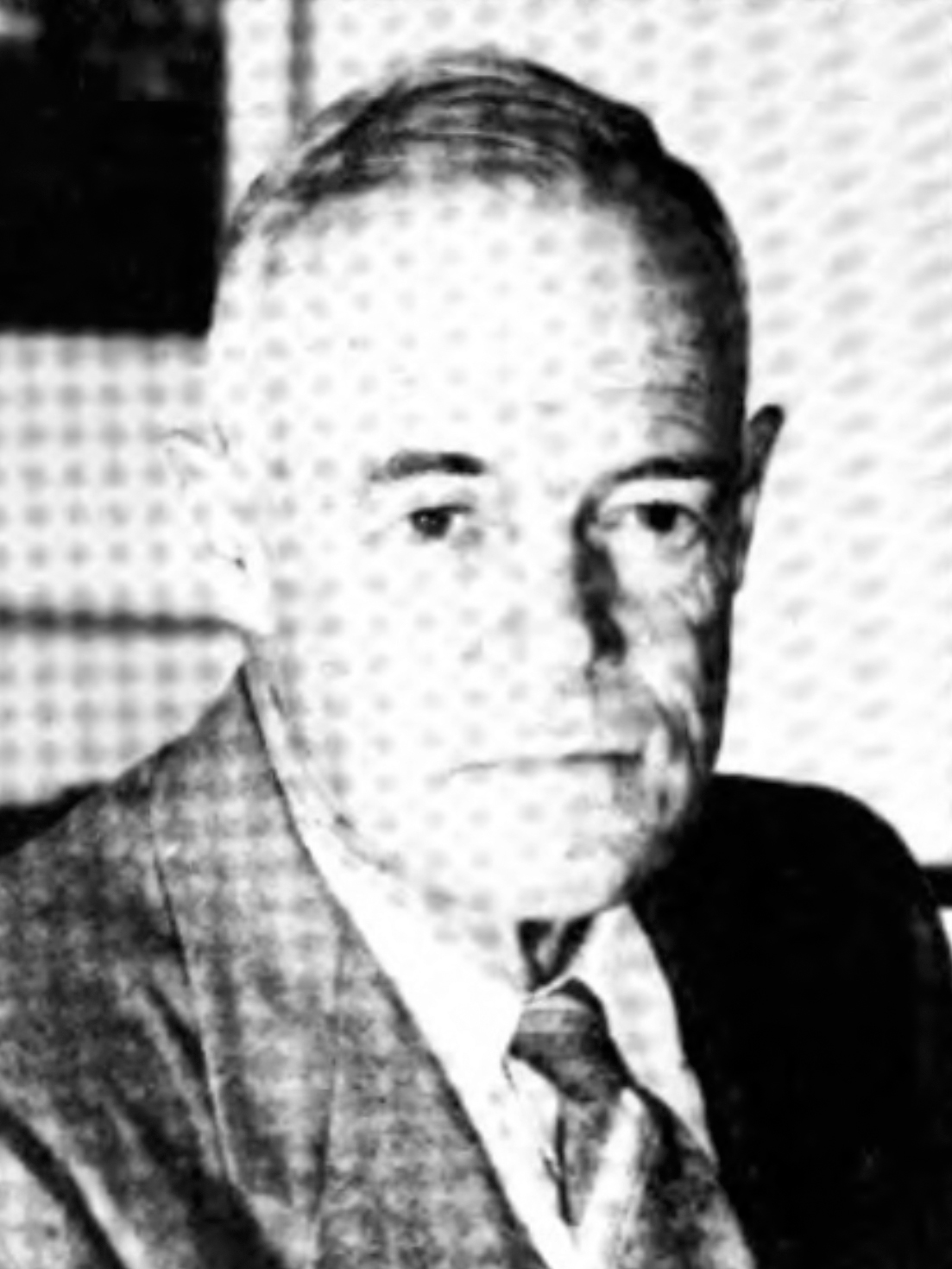

Member of the California Senate from the 31st district
- In office December 2, 1955 – November 23, 1961
- Preceded by: Clarence C. Ward
- Succeeded by: Alvin C. Weingand

Personal details
- Born: December 24, 1901 Santa Barbara, California, U.S.
- Died: November 23, 1961 (aged 59) Santa Barbara, California, U.S.
- Party: Democratic
- Spouse: Cynthia Boyd (m. 1928)

John James Hollister Jr. (December 24, 1901 – November 23, 1961) was an agriculturalist, banker, and California state senator.

== Family ==
John James Hollister Jr. was born in 1901 in Santa Barbara, California. He was the son of J. James Hollister and Dorothy (Steffens) Hollister of Hollister Ranch, and the grandson of William Welles Hollister. His mother was Lottie Steffens Hollister the sister of journalist Lincoln Steffens.

== Marriage ==
John J. Hollister Jr. married Cynthia Boyd in the year of 1928.

== Information ==
In San Benito County, the city of Hollister was named after John J. Hollister Jr.'s grandfather, William Welles Hollister, who had possession of the land during the years 1861–1875. His grandfather also had "Hollister Ranch" named after him. This area is in Santa Barbara, California and is known among seasoned surfers to be a good spot for surfing.

== Death ==
John James Hollister Jr. died in office in Santa Barbara in the year of 1961.

== Sources ==
- University of California Davis: Biography of John J. Hollister, Jr.
- Ladies in the Laboratory v. 2
