= James Q. Wedworth =

American politician

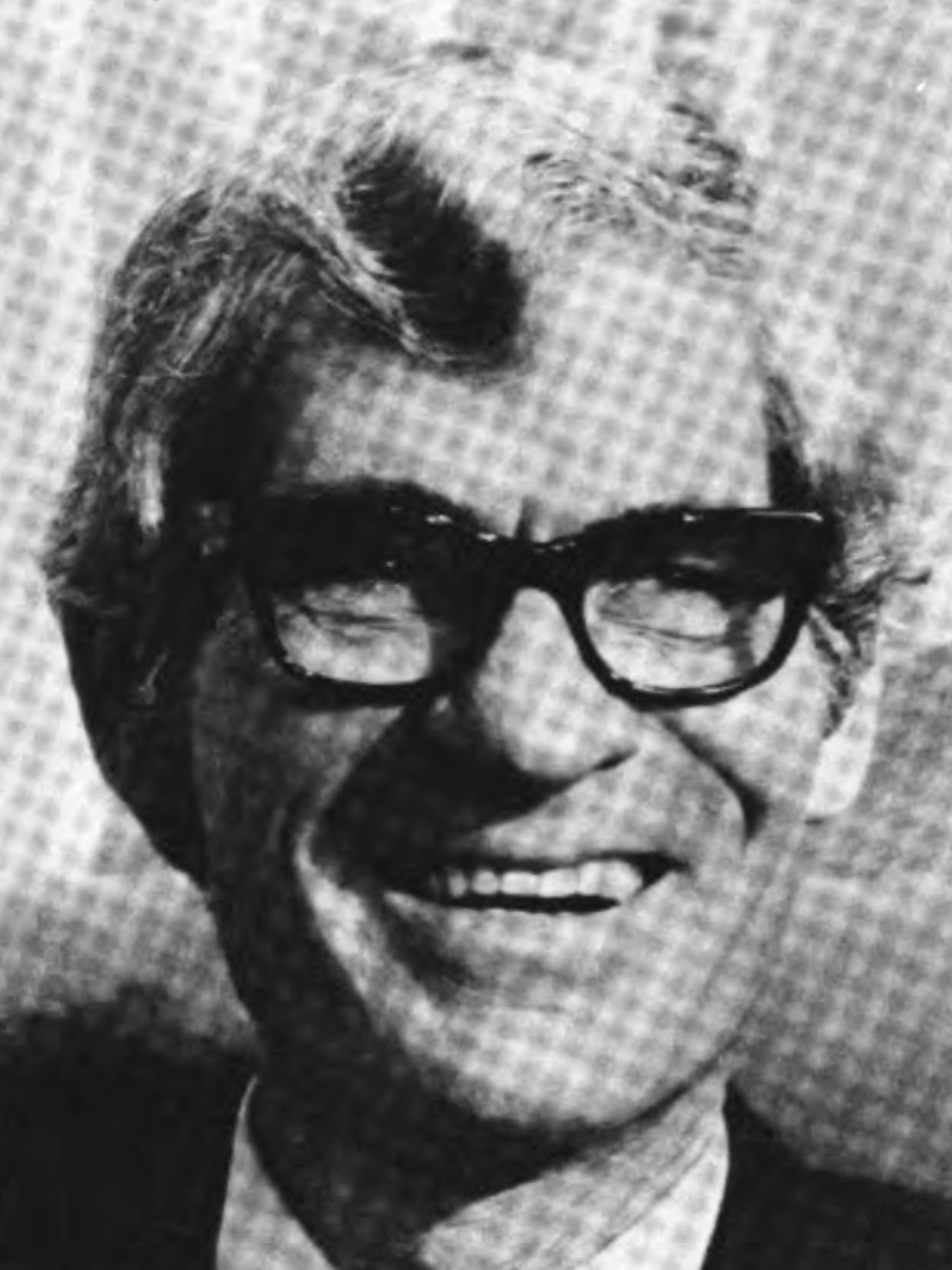

Member of the California Senate from the 31st district
- In office January 2, 1967 – November 30, 1976
- Preceded by: Alvin C. Weingand
- Succeeded by: George Deukmejian

Personal details
- Born: April 14, 1919 Illinois, U.S.
- Died: December 22, 1998 (aged 79) Newcastle, California, U.S.
- Party: Democratic
- Spouse: Muriel Berube
- Children: 4

Military service
- Branch/service: United States Navy
- Battles/wars: World War II

James Q. Wedworth (April 14, 1919 – December 22, 1998) served in the California legislature and during World War II he served in the United States Navy.

== Personal ==
He was born on April 14, 1919, in Illinois. He married Muriel Berube and had four children: sons Ronald and Albert and daughters Susan and Diane. He saw military service during World War II.

He a ran an orchard and a horse boarding farm. He was actively involved in the Boy Scouts, Rotary, Little League and Pop Warner football.

Wedworth died in 1998 at age 79.

== Career ==
Wedworth was a California state senator and for nearly 25 years he was mayor of Hawthorne. In 1970, along with assemblyman Larry Townsend, he was responsible for introducing a bill allowing paramedics to save lives in emergency situations. It wasn't until Ronald Reagan—who at the time was governor of California—signed the Wedworth-Townsend Paramedic Act that paramedics were allowed to run calls without nurses attending.
