= Odette Dulac =

French actress and singer

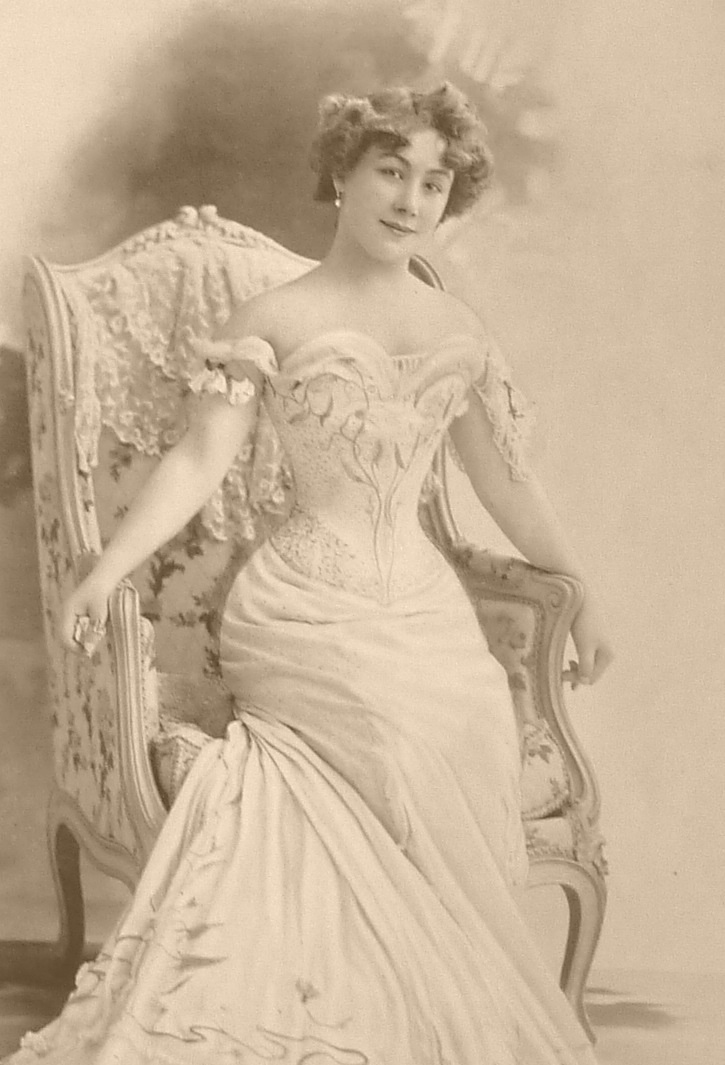
Odette Dulac, photographed by Reutlinger, 1903

Odette Dulac (14 July 1865 – 3 November 1939) was a French actress, singer and diseuse in the manner of Yvette Guilbert.

== Background ==
Dulac was born in Aire-sur-Adour. She became a militant feminist and novelist. La houille rouge: les enfants de la violence (The Red Coal, 1916) narrated the horrors of raped and impregnated Frenchwomen at the time the First World War was being waged, in an anti-abortion polemic of triumphing French nationalism. She became a member of the Ligue des droits de femme (League for Women's Rights).

At the start of her public career, as a singer-actress, she appeared in light opera at Antwerp in 1895 and was soon a star at the Théâtre des Bouffes Parisiens, where she appeared in André Messager's operetta, Les p'tites Michu (1897). In London, at the Empire Theatre, she had a hit with The Honeysuckle and the Bee.

Turning her hand to modelling witty caricatures, she performed Don Juan of Boulevard X at the Salon Humouriste, Paris 1908.

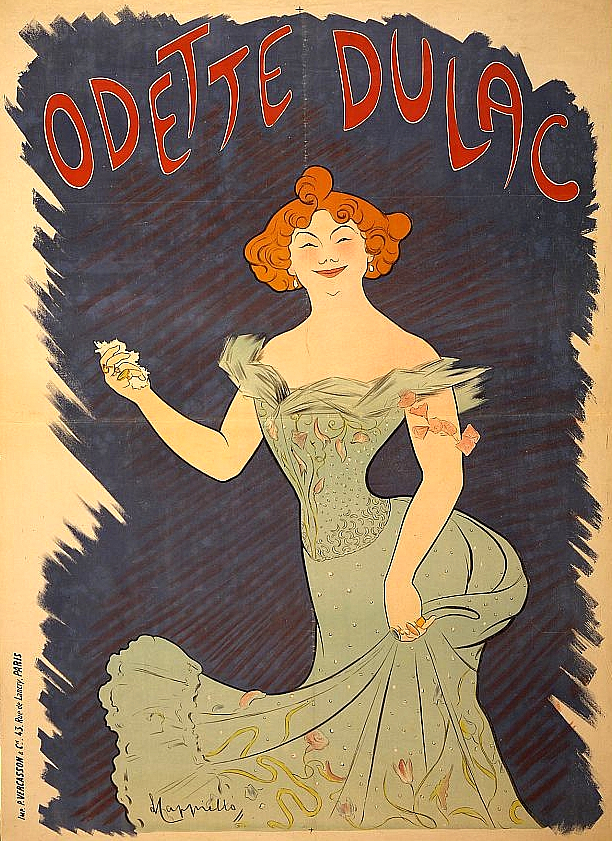

Aside from La houille rouge, she published Le droit de plaisir (1908), her first novel; a feminist erotic text, Faut-il? (1919), a case of love for a mutilated soldier; Les Désexués: roman de moeurs (1924) co-authored with Charles-Etienne about the downfall of a gay man in 1920s Paris; Tel quel (1926), denouncing social and religious hypocrisy and encouraging women to speak up for themselves; and Leçons d'amour (1929).
