= Maurice Lamy =

French actor and singer (1863–1930)

Lamy in 1901

As Aristide (right) in Les p'tites Michu (1897) with Victor Regnard and Mme Vigouroux

Maurice Lamy or M. Lamy was the stage name of the French actor and singer Maurice Castarède (1863–1930). He came from a theatrical family but began as a violinist before becoming an actor. Among the leading roles he created were Aristide in André Messager's Les p'tites Michu (1897), Loustot in Messager's Véronique (1898) and Le Taupier, the wizard, in Charles Lecocq's La Belle au bois dormant (1900).

== Life and career ==
Lamy was born in Lyon to a theatrical family. His father was a theatre manager and his elder brother Charles became an actor. He started as a musician, and became a principal orchestral violinist before debuting as an actor at the Théâtre du Parc in Brussels in 1883. He was then engaged in Paris, at the Théâtre Lyrique national (Château d'Eau), taking over roles in Les Amours du diable, Le Chien du jardinier and Fanfan-la-Tulipe. After moving to the Théâtre des Folies-Dramatiques in 1890 he created roles in Paris-Folies, Cousin-Cousine and Cliquette.

At the Nouveau-Théâtre in 1895 he played in Les Dessous de l'année, and at the Eldorado Theatre he created roles in Joséphine vendue par ses sœurs, Kif-Kif-Revue, Dormez, je le veux by Georges Feydeau, and La Reine des reines. Engaged at the Bouffes-Parisiens, he created the roles of Aristide in André Messager's Les p'tites Michu (1897) and Loustot in Messager's Véronique (1898), Roger in Émile Pessard's La Dame de Trèfle (1898), Jack in Gaston Serpette's Shakespeare (1899) and Le Taupier, the wizard, in Charles Lecocq's La Belle au bois dormant (1900). He performed in Monte-Carlo and on tour in the French provinces. He took over the role of Francine's Papa in Parisiana in 1901.

Lamy's later roles included Vincent in Eugène Brieux' La Femme seule (Gymnase-Dramatique, 1912), and at the Théâtre national de l'Odéon the title role in Miguel Zamacoïs' Monsieur Césarin, écrivain public (1919) and a Doctor in Henry Dupuy-Mazuel's Molière (1922). At the Théâtre de la Porte Saint-Martin he played Monseigneur de Cabriac in Henry Bataille's La Tendresse (1924) and the Traveller in Zamacoïs' Seigneur Polichinelle (1925).

Lamy died in 1930.

== Sources ==
- Martin, Jules (1901). Nos artistes: annuaire des théâtres et concerts, 1901–1902 (in French). Paris: Ollendorf.
- Stoullig, Edmond (1898). Les Annales du Théâtre et de la Musique, 1897 (in French). Paris: Ollendorf.
- Stoullig, Edmond (1899). Les Annales du Théâtre et de la Musique, 1898 (in French). Paris: Ollendorf.
- Stoullig, Edmond (1900). Les Annales du Théâtre et de la Musique, 1899 (in French). Paris: Ollendorf.
- Stoullig, Edmond (1901). Les Annales du Théâtre et de la Musique, 1900 (in French). Paris: Ollendorf.
