= San Ysidro Ranch =

Resort located in Montecito foothills of California

Coordinates: 34°26′49″N 119°37′24″W

- Type: Hotel
- Founded: 1893
- Headquarters: Santa Barbara, California, US
- Owner: Ty Warner
- Website: www.sanysidroranch.com

Gardenia Cottage

Terrace Cottage

San Ysidro Ranch is a luxury resort in Montecito, California, located in the foothills of the Santa Ynez Mountains. Established as a guest ranch in the late 19th century, the property has hosted guests ranging from Winston Churchill and John F. Kennedy to Justin and Hailey Bieber. Entrepreneur Ty Warner acquired San Ysidro Ranch in 2000 and subsequently undertook an extensive restoration of the property. The resort remains part of Ty Warner Hotels & Resorts.

== History ==
The San Ysidro Ranch was named, by the Franciscan friars who occupied the land, after Saint Isidore, the patron saint of farmers and agriculture, often depicted with a plow, angel and oxen.

Originally part of a land grant in 1769 by the Charles III of Spain, the Ranch was fully deeded with the Presidio in 1780, serving as a sanctuary for Franciscan friars in the late 1700s. In 1828 the Mission Padres built the Old Adobe and began to farm the land, until it passed through the hands of the mission to become part of the municipal land of the state of California in 1864.

Subsequently, the ranch was sold to Harleigh Johnston and Taylor Goodrich in 1883, by Col. Bradbury Dinsmore.

The San Ysidro Citrus Ranch harvested an average of 300,000 oranges and 100,000 lemons annually. In 1889, a large sandstone packing house was built for the citrus production.

In 1892, a ranch house was built that would become The Hacienda, and plans were made for a small hotel. During this time the hotel expanded to accommodate parties, lunch and dinners. The fruit company remained a prominent part of the operation.

By 1912, the ranch hosted Winston Churchill and his family for the winter months.

After the depression, the Johnstons sold the hotel to Hollywood actor Ronald Colman and hotelier and former Senator Alvin Carl Weingand, who transformed the ranch into a venue for celebrities; known for its setting, service and guest privacy. Guests over the years range from Audrey Hepburn, Lucille Ball, Bing Crosby and Groucho Marx to Winston Churchill, John Galsworthy, Somerset Maugham and Sinclair Lewis. Vivien Leigh and Laurence Olivier were married at the ranch. John F. Kennedy and Jacqueline honeymooned there as well. Following Colman's death in 1958 and the death of Weingand's first wife, Beverly, Senator Weingand's wife, Lou Hyland Weingand purchased their shares and became co-owner.

In 1976, hoteliers Jim and Susie Lavenson purchased the ranch from Weingand. Jim Lavenson had been an advertising executive and president of New York City's Plaza Hotel, before buying the property.

Entrepreneur Ty Warner acquired the ranch in 2000 and made it part of the Ty Warner Hotels & Resorts, LLC. Melissa Etheridge and Linda Wallem wed on the ranch grounds in June 2014.

Half of the ranch was destroyed by a ruptured gas line after a series of mudslides on January 9, 2018.

== Facilities ==
San Ysidro Ranch is home to 38 individually designed cottages, surrounded by landscaped gardens, that each feature private entrances and outdoor areas, fireplaces, soaking tubs and indoor and outdoor showers.

The property also includes The Salon & Spa, an outdoor swimming pool, fitness facilities, mini golf and bocce, as well as 17 miles of hiking trails throughout the surrounding foothills.

Dining venues include The Stonehouse Restaurant, serving California cuisine with garden and terrace seating; The Speakeasy, offering cocktails and light bites in a 1920s-inspired setting; and The Veranda, featuring fireside and outdoor dining.

The Ranch has a wine collection of around 16,000 bottles. The Ty Warner Wine Collective offers private tastings and educational wine experiences drawing from the collection. A private tasting room known as the Secret Cellar is located beneath the Stonehouse Restaurant.

== Awards ==
In 2026, San Ysidro Ranch was named No. 1 hotel in the U.S. and No. 22 in the world on The World's 50 Best hotels list. It was the highest position achieved by a U.S. property since the ranking was established.

The resort has also maintained a Five-Star rating from Forbes Travel Guide and was awarded One Michelin Key by the Michelin Guide in 2026. The Ranch is consistently recognized by leading travel and lifestyle publications, including Travel + Leisure, Condé Nast Traveler, Modern Luxury, Sunset Magazine, among others. The Ranch has also been named the "World's Most Romantic Boutique Hotel" and the "#1 Boutique Hotel in the World."

The Stonehouse Restaurant has held Wine Spectator's Grand Award since 2014, the publication's highest distinction for restaurant wine programs. In 2026, The Speakeasy was named on the world's best hotel bars on Forbes Travel Guide's Hotel Star Bars list as only one of five bars in the U.S. to receive the distinction.
