= Emilia Baeyertz =

Welsh Christian evangelist (1842–1826)

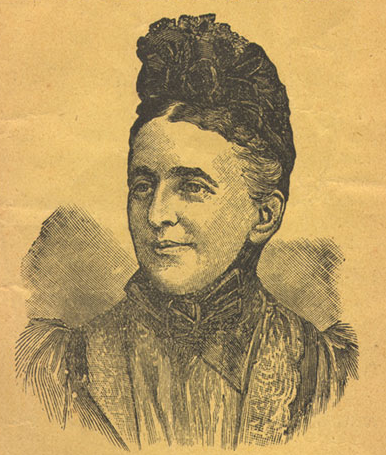
- Portrait of Emilia Baeyertz, 1895
- Born: Emilia Louise Aronson; 29 March 1842; Bangor, Caernarfonshire, Wales
- Died: 26 April 1926 (aged 84); Streatham, Surrey, England
- Occupation: Missionary
- Years active: 1871–1926
- Organization: YWCA
- Spouse: Charles Baeyertz (m. 1865; died 1871)
- Children: 2, including Charles Nalder Baeyertz

Emilia Louise Baeyertz (née Aronson; 29 March 1842 – 26 April 1926) was a Welsh Christian evangelist, born to a devout Jewish family in Wales, who described herself as "the Christian Jewess". She was homeschooled due to her poor health and suffered a breakdown when her fiancé was diagnosed with tuberculosis. Her family sent her to Australia to live with her sister to help her recovery, where she fell in love with and secretly married an Anglican Christian man.

Baeyertz did not intend to convert to Christianity when she married him, but she subsequently did for the sake of her children. Her husband died as a result of a shooting accident in 1871, whereupon she experienced a full conversion to Christianity. She spent the following few years giving sermons and, by 1879, she was featured speaker for a YWCA campaign of sermons, before spending a decade conducting Christian missions around Victoria.

Between 1890 and 1904, Baeyertz conducted missions around the world, starting in New Zealand, then spending a few years in the US and Canada, before returning to the United Kingdom and Ireland.

== Biography ==
Emilia Louise Aronson was born on 29 March 1842 in Bangor, Caernarfonshire (present-day Gwynedd) to John Aronson (né Aaronson), a Prussian-born jeweller and draper, and Maria Aronson (née Lazarus). Baeyertz was born to an Orthodox Jewish family.

Baeyertz attended school for a while but, by the time she reached thirteen, her family removed her from formal education and she remained at home due to her ill health. Instead, she spent her time with her mother, who used to read Shakespeare to her, and would spend time in her family's library practising reading aloud.

When she was old enough, she attended social events and soon met a young Jewish man. He asked her father for her hand in marriage, and the father agreed on the condition that the man take out life insurance. While Emilia was planning the wedding, her fiancé attended doctor's appointments as part of the insurance underwriting process. There he was diagnosed with tuberculosis and told that he did not have long to live. The wedding was cancelled, and Baeyertz suffered a breakdown and ill health as a result.

In February 1864, her family sent her and her brother to Melbourne to live with her sister, with the intention of helping to improve Baeyertz's health. By the time the siblings arrived by ship in Melbourne, Baeyertz had already recovered and she quickly integrated herself into the Australian social life. She soon met Charles Baeyertz, a bank manager at the Richmond branch of National Bank of Australasia and a practising Anglican. The couple started a relationship, keeping it secret from both their families.

Baeyertz agreed to marry Charles on the condition that he would never attempt to convert her to Christianity—indeed, that he would never mention his religion to her at all. The couple married in secret at Christ Church in Hawthorn, Victoria on 16 October 1865. Soon after, the Baeyertz family discovered the marriage and disowned her for marrying a non-Jewish man. They moved to Colac, Victoria where Charles found a new role as bank manager for the National Bank of Australasia, and they had two children, son Charles Nalder who went on to be a journalist and establish a New Zealand magazine, and daughter Marion. Baeyertz started attending church with her husband, and she decided to convert to Christianity for her children's sake towards the end of the 1860s, when Marion was baptised. She did not believe in the Christian tenets, so she had a friend fill in her baptism application to ensure that the answers were correct.

== Evangelical work ==
Baeyertz's husband died on 6 March 1871 at the age of 28, two days after a shooting accident. She turned to the Anglican church to help her and she experienced a full conversion to the religion. She put her children into boarding school and became an evangelist, visiting jails and hospitals to spread the religion, as well as door-to-door preaching to the Jewish areas of Melbourne. She did not manage to convert anyone and ended up with her life threatened.

Baeyertz joined the YWCA and was soon preaching to large crowds. By 1879, she was the featured speaker for a campaign of sermons in Sandhurst, eventually converting 200 individuals. She then conducted a Christian mission to Ballarat, with crowds of 2,300 assembling to hear her talk. Emilia conducted a number of further missions around Victoria between 1880 and 1890. In December 1880, she led a mission at Flinders Street Baptist Church in Adelaide. She was invited back over the next three years to preach in all the churches of the South Australian Baptist Association, with some meetings moved to the Adelaide Town Hall to fit the crowds in. In 1890, she went to New Zealand to preach, before moving on to North America. She arrived in San Francisco in October 1890, and spent two years giving sermons in conjunction with the YMCA in Los Angeles, San Francisco, and Boston in USA as well as Toronto and Ottawa in Canada.

In 1892, Baeyertz returned to the United Kingdom, preaching and conducting missions in Ireland, Scotland, and England. There she would preach to packed halls, sometimes to just women, earning £43 in a fortnight (worth about £17,000 in 2014). (Note: Comparing average earnings between 1895 and 2014, £43 is valued at approximately £17,220 by MeasuringWorth.com) She remained in her London base until 1904, when she returned to Australia. Emilia arrived in Perth in May 1904, remaining there for a year before returning to Victoria. Towards the end of her life, she returned to England. She conducted a few missions before her death on 26 April 1926 in Streatham, Surrey (present-day Lambeth and Wandsworth).

== Bibliography ==
- Lemon, Barbara (2013). "Baeyertz, Emilia Louise (1842–1926)". The Australian Women's Register. The National Foundation for Australian Women (NFAW).
- Bourke, Chris (2008). "Cultural Crusader". Journal of New Zealand Literature (26): 153–159. JSTOR 25663033.
- Makin, A. J. (2002). "Women and Children". International Macroeconomics (illustrated, reprint ed.). Pearson Education. ISBN 9780582369924.
- Hunt, Arnold Dudley (1985). This Side of Heaven: A History of Methodism in South Australia. Lutheran Publishing House. p. 128. ISBN 9780859103466.
- Baeyertz, Emilia (1891). "Five lectures delivered by Mrs. Baeyertz, the converted Jewess, with the story of her conversion from Judaism to Christianity". Canadiana. Hill & Weir.
- Baruch, Betty; Coverdale, Amanda (2017). This Is My Beloved, The Story of Emilia Baeyertz, Jewish Christian Lady Evangelist. CATTAC Press. ISBN 978-0-9945724-0-0. A novelised account.
- Coverdale, Garth (2017). This Is My Beloved Companion. CATTAC Press. ISBN 978-0-9945724-1-7. Notes for the reader of This is My Beloved.
