= Amy Augarde =

English actress and singer

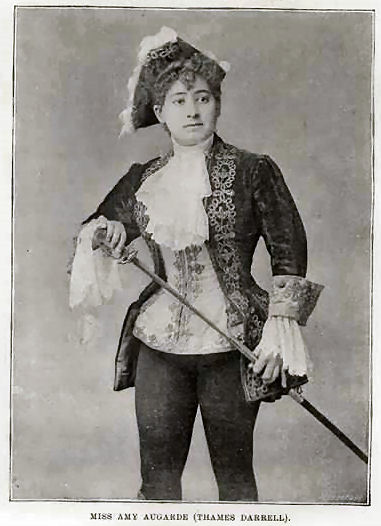
Amy Augarde as Thames Darrell in a revival of Little Jack Sheppard (1894)

Amy Florence Augarde (7 July 1868 – 1 April 1959) was an English actress and singer in musical theatre and operetta. She performed in Gilbert and Sullivan operas and other works for Richard D'Oyly Carte in the US, England and elsewhere before playing roles in such successful musical theatre works as Dorothy, The Little Michus and The Chocolate Soldier in London.

== Life and career ==
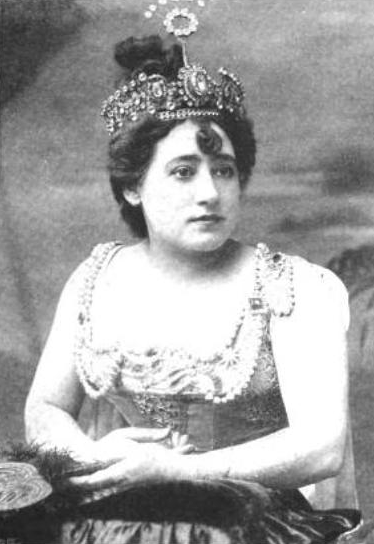
In The Wizard of the Nile (1897)

Born at Westminster, Augarde was a member of a musical family. Among her siblings, Louise Adele Augarde (later King, 1863–1909) was a contralto with the D'Oyly Carte Opera Company, Frank Wells Augarde was a violinist, John Vernham Augarde was organist of St Paul's Church, Knightsbridge, and Augustus Wells Augarde was a clarinet player in the London Symphony Orchestra. Augarde was the aunt of Adrienne Augarde.

Augarde first appeared on stage in 1884, when she was fifteen, winning a place in the chorus of one of Richard D'Oyly Carte's British touring companies. In 1885 and 1886 she was in the United States with Carte's American company playing The Mikado, and then joined the chorus of his tour of Germany and Austria. In 1887 she was back in the US with Carte's American company playing Ruddigore, usually in the chorus, but sometimes playing the small role of Ruth. Later that year she was the understudy to Jessie Bond for the role of Mad Margaret in Ruddigore with the D'Oyly Carte Opera Company in London's Savoy Theatre and played the role in September. In January 1888 she was cast as Cousin Hebe in the company's first revival of H.M.S. Pinafore.

Later in 1888 Augarde played Lydia Hawthorne in the long-running comic opera Dorothy at the Lyric Theatre, and the next year originated the part of Lady Anne Jerningham in Doris, also at the Lyric. She went on to appear in many successful musicals and operettas in London, including long runs in The Little Michus (1905 to 1906), The Chocolate Soldier (1910 to 1911), Shell Out (1915 to 1916), Nobody's Boy (1919), and The Naughty Princess (1920 to 1921). In 1925 she played Luisa in Franz Lehar's Frasquita. In 1935 she was Dancing Sunbeam in a revival of The Rose of Persia.

Augarde was also a successful gramophone recording artist.

She died in Reigate, Surrey, at the age of 90.
