= Alvin C. Weingand =

American politician

Alvin Carl Weingand
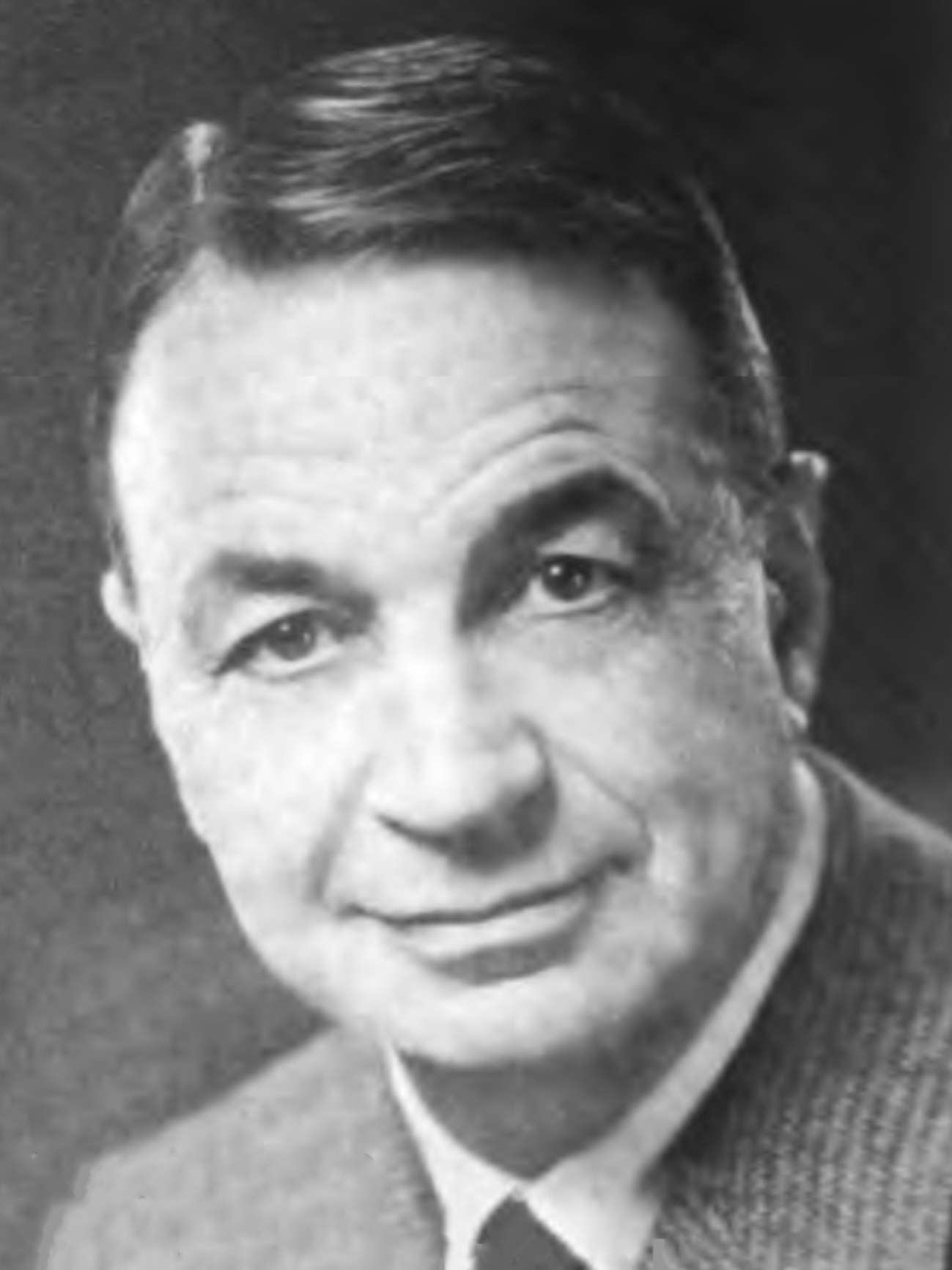

Member of the California Senate from the 31st district
- In office February 24, 1962 – January 2, 1967
- Preceded by: John J. Hollister Jr.
- Succeeded by: James Q. Wedworth

Personal details
- Born: June 11, 1904 North Platte, Nebraska, U.S.
- Died: January 11, 1995 (aged 90) Santa Barbara, California, U.S.
- Party: Democratic
- Spouse(s): Beverly Hollister; Louise "Lou" Ladsburgh; Elizabeth Weingand
- Children: 2
- Education: University of California, Berkeley

Military service
- Branch/service: United States Navy
- Battles/wars: World War II

Alvin Carl Weingand (June 11, 1904 – January 11, 1995) (North Platte, Nebraska), moved to California in 1920. He attended Los Angeles Polytechnic High School and in 1927 he earned his B.A. in economics at the University of California, Berkeley.

He served in the California legislature from the 31st District and during World War II he served in the United States Navy. He was an owner of the San Ysidro Ranch resort.

Weingand is mentioned in the memoir The Moon's a Balloon by film star David Niven. According to Niven, Weingand was a desk clerk at a Los Angeles hotel around 1934 and generously allowed the struggling actor to stay in a small room at a greatly reduced rent.
