= Les p'tites Michu =

Opérette by André Messager

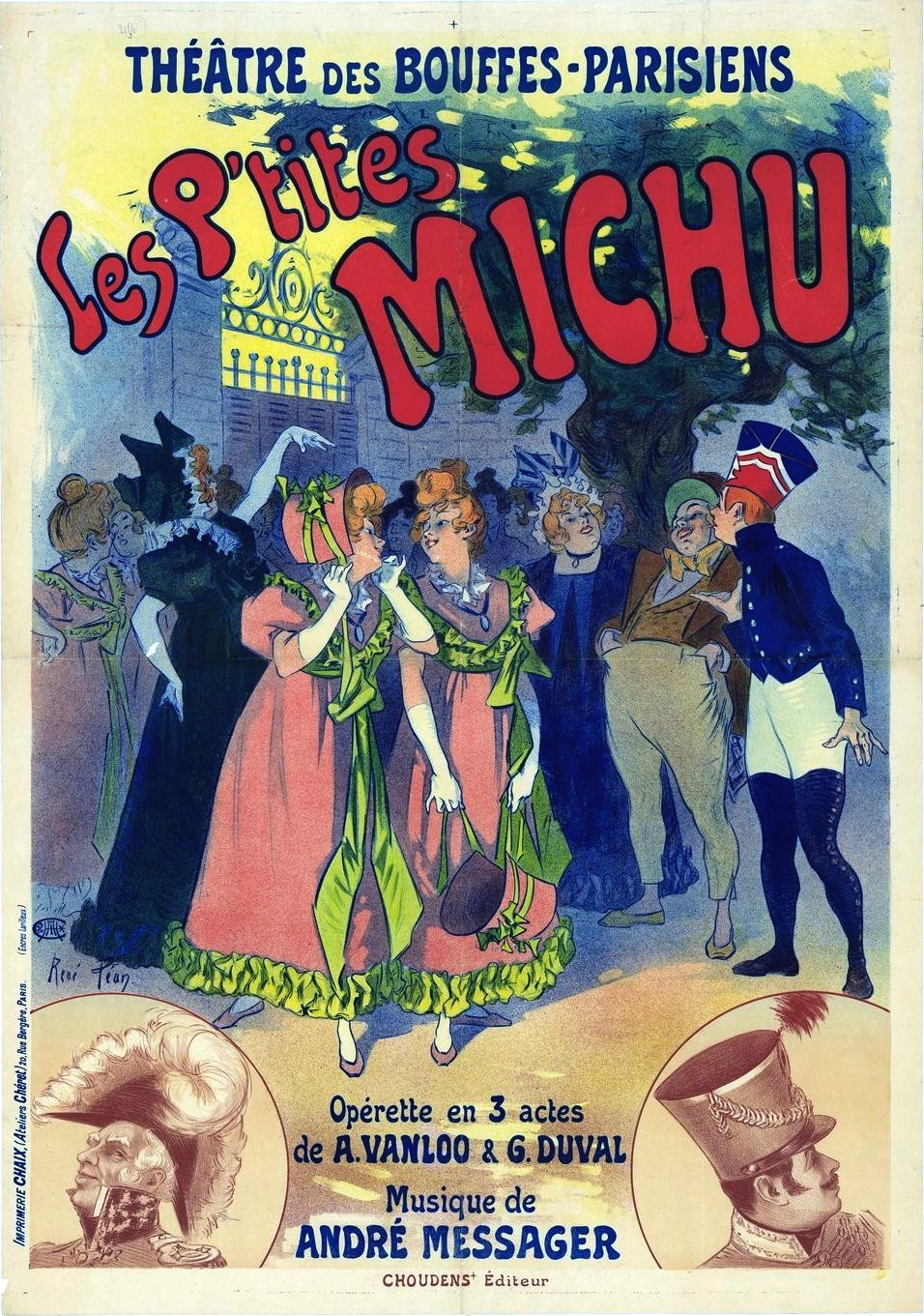
Poster for first production, 1897

Les p'tites Michu (The Little Michus) is an opérette in three acts, with music by André Messager and words by Albert Vanloo and Georges Duval. The piece is set in Paris in the years following the French Revolution and depicts the complications ensuing after the identities of two girls become confused in their infancy.

The opera opened at the Théâtre des Bouffes-Parisiens, Paris, on 16 November 1897 and ran for more than 150 performances. It became an international success, with productions in four continents, including an unusually long run of 400 performances in London, and had subsequent revivals in Paris.

== Background and first production ==
Odette Dulac (Blanche-Marie) and Alice Bonheur (Marie-Blanche), 1897

After a considerable success in 1890 with his opéra comique La Basoche Messager had a series of failures later in the decade. Among these, Madame Chrysanthème (1893) played for 16 performances in Paris, Mirette (1894), written for London, had a disappointing run, and Le chevalier d'Harmental (1896) ran for only six performances at the Opéra-Comique. An opérette, La fiancée en loterie (1896), managed 71 showings, and a "pièce fantastique", La montagne enchantée (1897), closed after 35 performances. Discouraged by these failures, Messager resolved to compose no more, and retreated to a cottage in the English countryside with his wife, the Irish songwriter Hope Temple. In 1897 he received an unsolicited libretto. He did not know at the time that three other composers had already turned it down, and it appealed to him greatly. He began composing and completed the score in three months.

The first performance was at the Théâtre des Bouffes-Parisiens on 16 November 1897, starring Odette Dulac in one of the title roles, with the production running for over 150 performances.

== Roles ==
Victor Regnard (Michu), Mme Vigouroux (Mme Michu) and Maurice Lamy (Aristide), 1897

Roles, voice types, premiere cast
Role	Voice type	Premiere cast, 16 November 1897 Conductor: André Messager
Général des Ifs	bass	Barral
Michu	baritone	Victor Regnard
Aristide	tenor	Maurice Lamy
Bagnolet	tenor	Brunais
Gaston Rigaud	baritone	Henri Marchand
Marie-Blanche	soprano	Alice Bonheur
Blanche-Marie	soprano	Odette Dulac
Mlle Herpin	mezzo-soprano	Léonie Laporte
Madame Michu	soprano	Vigouroux
Madame Rousselin	soprano	Lérys
Madame Saint-Phar	soprano	Yrven

== Synopsis ==
In 1793, the wife of the Marquis des Ifs dies in childbirth. The Marquis, before disappearing to evade arrest by revolutionary forces, entrusts the infant girl to the Michus, paying the family a sum of money that allows them to open a prosperous shop. The Michus have a daughter of their own. While bathing the two babies, M. Michu mixes them up and cannot tell which is which.

Act 1

By 1810, the girls, Blanche-Marie and Marie-Blanche, have grown up together, believing themselves to be twins, and have gone to school under the military Mlle. Herpin. Aristide, the Michus' clerk, is in love with one of the girls but is not sure which. The Marquis des Ifs, now a general, sends Bagnolet to find his daughter, whose hand he has promised to lieutenant Gaston Rigaud, an officer who saved his life. It turns out that Gaston is Mlle. Herpin's nephew, and while visiting his aunt, the girls meet the handsome lieutenant, and both are enchanted. Bagnolet finds the Michus. They are embarrassed at being unable to say which of the girls is the general's daughter.

Act 3 in original 1897 production

Act 2 The general and his guests await the arrival of his daughter. When the Michus arrive, the general is impatient with their explanation: he wants to know which girl is his daughter and will marry the lieutenant. Knowing that her sister is enamoured of Gaston, Blanche-Marie decides to make a sacrifice and identifies her sister as the general's daughter.

Act 3

With a sad heart, Blanche-Marie resigns herself to marry Aristide, whom she finds exceedingly uninteresting. On the other hand, and to the astonishment of her fiancé and the Marquis, Marie-Blanche goes to help at the shop at every opportunity. She realizes that she has made a mistake: her sister loves Gaston, and she herself would prefer the common life of the shop and marriage to Aristide. The day of the double wedding, Marie-Blanche looks for a portrait of the Marquis' wife. Her idea is to dress Blanche-Marie as the late Marchionesse. The resemblance is astonishing. The Marquis believes that he sees his wife: Blanche-Marie must be his daughter.

The two couples are sorted out and all ends happily. Madame Michu forbids her husband to hand the two young women to their respective bridgrooms: "Don't you touch them, or you'll mix them up again!" (Note: N'y touche plus! Tu les mêlerais encore!)

Source: Gänzl and Lamb

== Musical numbers ==
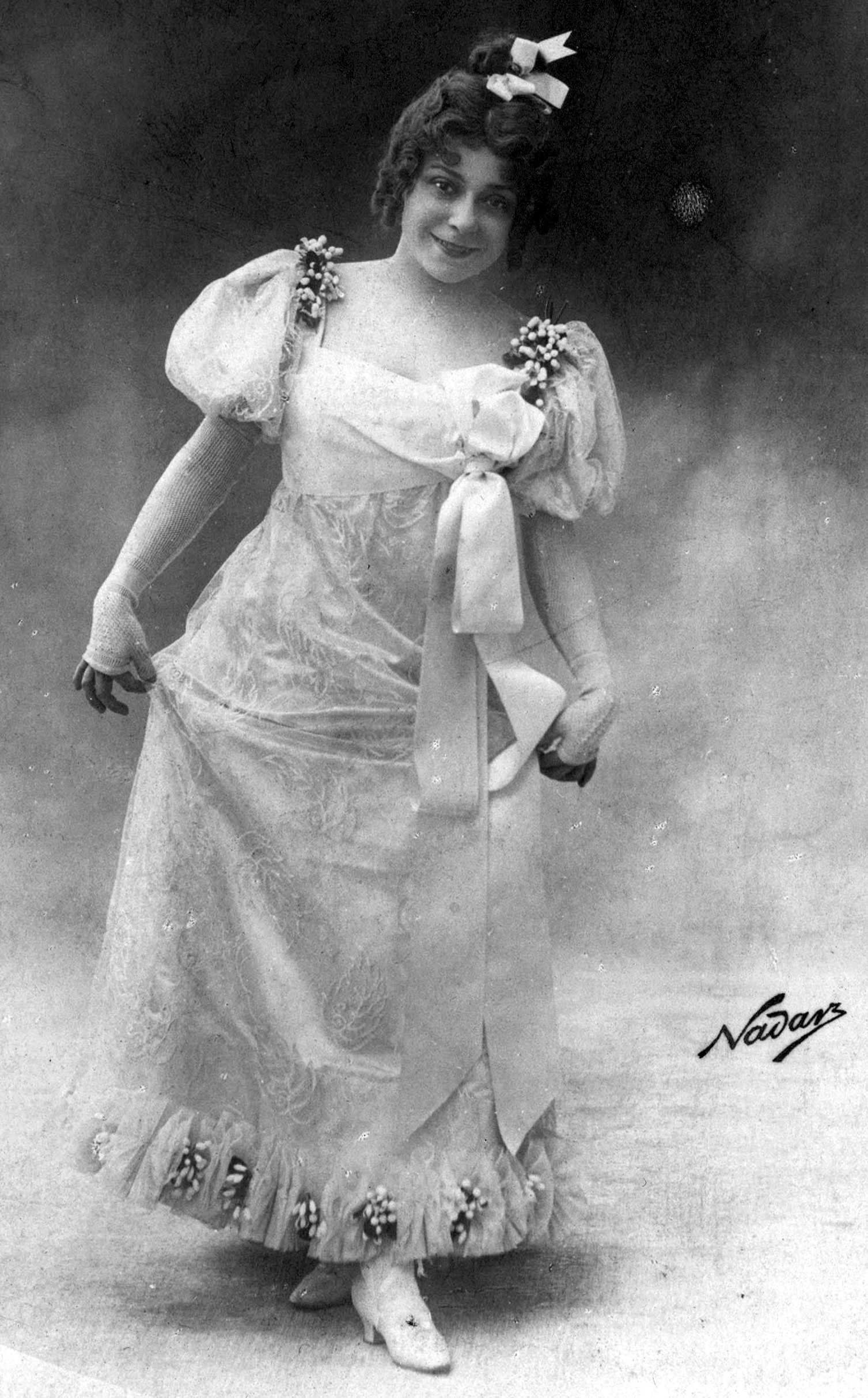
Mariette Sully as Marie-Blanche, 1899 revival

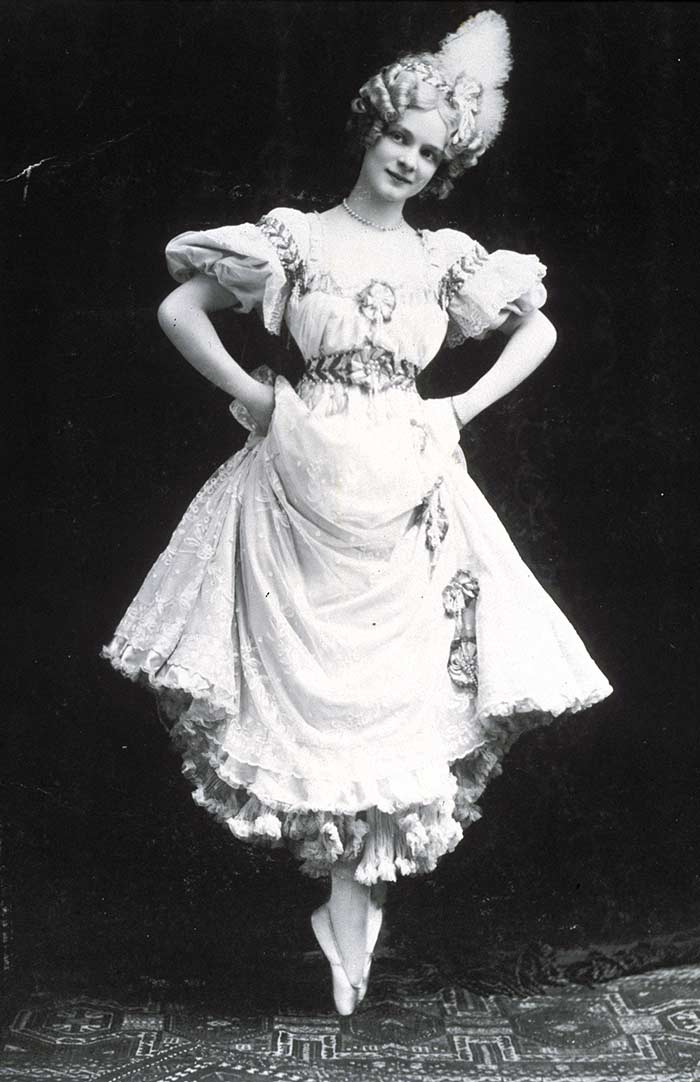
Adeline Genée in the London production

Robert Evett as Gaston and Willie Edouin as General des Ifs, London 1905

Act 1

- Overture
- Chorus and couplets "Le tambour résonne" ("The drum resounds") – Pensionnaires
- Duet "Blanche-Marie et Marie-Blanche" ("Blanche-Marie and Marie-Blanche") – The two sisters
- Madrigal "Quoi, vous tremblez ma belle enfant" ("What, you tremble my beautiful child") – Gaston
- Trio "Michu! Michu! Michu!" – Blanche-Marie, Marie-Blanche, Gaston
- Couplets "Sapristi! le beau militaire" ("Sapristi! The handsome soldier") – Marie-Blanche
- Trio "Nous v'là! Nous v'là!" et couplets "A l'ouvrage le matin" ("We're here! We're here!" and couplets "At work in the morning") – Mme Michu, Michu, Aristide
- Ensemble "Voici papa, maman Gâteau" ("Look, father and mother: cake!") – Blanche-Marie et Marie-Blanche
- Couplets "Blanche Marie, si douce" ("Blanche Marie, so sweet") – Aristide
- Finale "Je viens d'entendre un roulement" ("I have just heard a drumroll") – All

Act 2

- Introduction and chorus "A la santé du général" ("To the General's health!")
- Rondo "Non, je n'ai jamais vu ça" ("No, I never saw that") – The General
- Quartet "Entre là" ("Between them") – Blanche-Marie, Marie-Blanche, the Michus
- Duet "Ah! Quel malheur, quel malheur" ("Ah what a disaster") – Blanche-Marie, Marie-Blanche"
- Couplets "Me prenez-vous pour un conscrit" ("Do you take me for a conscript?") – The General
- Prayer "St-Nicolas" – Blanche-Marie, Marie-Blanche
- Trio "C'est la fille du général" ("It's the General's daughter") – Blanche-Marie, Marie-Blanche, Gaston
- Finale: "Capitaine, approchez" et Couplets "Mesdames, grand merci" ("Captain, approach … Thank you very much, ladies") – Marie-Blanche

Act 3

- Chorus and ensemble "A la boutique" ("At the shop")
- Couplets "Comme une girouette mon coeur tourmait" ("My heart was turning like a weather-vane") – Aristide
- Romance "Vois-tu, je m'en veux" ("See: I blame myself") – Blanche-Marie
- Chorus "Bonjour, mesdam's les mariées" et ronde des Halles "On peux chercher en tous pays" ("Hello, ladies, brides" and Rondo of Les Halles "We can search in all lands") – Marie-Blanche
- Duet "Rassurez-vous Monsieur Gaston" ("Do not worry, Monsieur Gaston") – Blanche-Marie, Gaston
- Sextet " Assieds-toi là" ("Sit here") – Blanche-Marie, Marie-Blanche, the Michus, Aristide, Gaston
- Finale "Blanche-Marie et Marie-Blanche" – All

== Revivals and adaptations ==
A revival at the Théâtre des Folies-Dramatiques in 1899 starred Mariette Sully and Jean Périer.

The work was given in German in Berlin in December 1898. The same adaptation was presented in Vienna in September 1899 at the Carltheater. The German version was also seen in Cologne. The opera was given in the original French in Brussels in January 1899. An Italian production opened at the Teatro Constanzi in Rome in January 1900. The work played in Lisbon in 1901 and Algiers in 1904.

The piece enjoyed a long run in London under the title The Little Michus. The English adaptation was by Henry Hamilton, with lyrics by Percy Greenbank, and was produced by George Edwardes at Daly's Theatre. The composer conducted the first night, on 29 April 1905, and the piece ran for 400 performances. It starred Adrienne Augarde and Mabel Green, with Robert Evett, Willie Edouin, Huntley Wright, Amy Augarde, Willie Warde, Ambrose Manning, Louis Bradfield. (Note: During the run Edouin (General des Ifs) was succeeded by George Graves; Manning (Michu) by Fred Emney Sr; Bradfield (Aristide) by Henry Lytton and then Gordon Cleather; Wright (Bagnolet) by James Blakeley and then Jack Cannot, Adrienne Augarde (Blanche-Marie) by Alice Hatton, and Green (Marie-Blanche) by Denise Orme.) A role was added during the run for the dancer Adeline Genée. A piece of comic business introduced by George Graves during the run involved a fictional animal called the Gazeka, which became a London fad.

The Australian premiere of The Little Michus was in June 1906 at Her Majesty's Theatre, Sydney, with George Lauri playing the role of General Des Ifs. In the US the work had a Broadway run in 1907, with George Graves, Ruth Julian and Alice Judson in the leading roles. and was first given in New Zealand in 1908.

== Recordings ==
A recording of the complete opera was made in May 2018 by the Compagnie Les Brigands, the Orchestre National des Pays de la Loire, and the Choeur d'Angers-Nantes Opéra, conducted by Pierre Dumoussaud. A DVD was issued in 2005 of a complete performance of the opera given at the Théâtre municipal de Clermont-Ferrand, in April of that year.

== Notes, references and sources ==
=== Sources ===
- Février, Henry (1948). André Messager: mon maître, mon ami. Paris: Amiot-Dumont. OCLC 906458628.
- Gänzl, Kurt; Andrew Lamb (1988). Gänzl's Book of the Musical Theatre. London: The Bodley Head. OCLC 966051934.
- Messager, André (1908). Le piccole michu. Milan: Giornali. OCLC 367409869.
- Edmond Stoullig (1898). Les Annales du théâtre et de la musique 1897. Paris: Ollendorff. OCLC 762925818.
- Stoullig, Edmond (1899). Les Annales du théâtre et de la musique 1898. Paris: Ollendorff. OCLC 459094401.
- Traubner, Richard (2003). Operetta: A Theatrical History. London: Routledge. ISBN 978-0-415-96641-2.
- Wagstaff, John (1991). André Messager: A Bio-Bibliography. New York: Greenwood Press. ISBN 978-0-313-25736-0.
- Wearing, J. P. (2014). The London Stage, 1900–1909: A calendar of productions, performers, and personnel (second ed.). Lanham, Maryland: Rowman & Littlefield. ISBN 978-0-8108-9294-1.
