= Charles Nalder Baeyertz =

Journalist, editor, critic (1866–1943)

- Baeyertz in approximately 1918
- Born: 15 December 1866; Richmond, Colony of Victoria
- Died: 5 June 1943 (aged 76); Rylstone, New South Wales, Australia
- Known for: The Triad magazine

Charles Nalder Baeyertz (15 December 1866 – 5 June 1943) was a New Zealand teacher, journalist, editor, publisher and music critic. He was born on 15 December 1866 in Richmond, Victoria, to bank manager Charles Baeyertz and his wife Emilia Baeyertz. When his father died in a shooting accident, Baeyertz was put into boarding school and his mother became a famous evangelist. He graduated with a licentiate from the London College of Music and moved to New Zealand with his wife Bella.

Whilst in New Zealand, Baeyertz founded a journal, The Triad, which he edited and co-owned for 32 years. The journal became the most successful literary magazine of the time, supposedly found "in every club, hotel and reading-room throughout Australasia".

== Biography ==
[The] lasting impact of Emilia's intensity, and the extent to which Charles followed her example, are demonstrated by the 'Apostolic fire' which imbued his cultural mission to New Zealand and promoted him to found his critical magazine, The Triad. Strains of his mother's evangelism resound through its pages, not only in his exacting musical and literary reviews, but also in his many pronouncements on the moral dangers of 'a prevalence of bad English' and his dire warnings on the evils of faulty diction

— Joanna Woods in Facing the Music: Charles Baeyertz

Charles Nalder Baeyertz was born on 15 December 1866 in Richmond, Victoria. His father, Charles Bayertz, was an Anglican bank manager for the National Bank of Australasia and his mother was Emilia Baeyertz, a Welsh-Jewish woman who had been disowned by her family for marrying outside her religion. He also had a sister, Marion, two years his junior. Baeyertz's father died in a shooting accident in 1871, and his mother then converted to Christianity, going on to become a famous evangelist.

Baeyertz attended Wesley College as a day boarder. He later travelled with his mother to South Australia where he attended Prince Alfred College in Kent Town, Adelaide. There he launched a school magazine, but control was taken over by the school when he mocked one of the teachers. When he graduated he received a licentiate from the London College of Music – the only licentiate in music available in New Zealand at the time. In 1888 when Baeyertz was 20, he married a Baptist minister's daughter, 28 year old Isabella Delgarno Johnston, and the couple had four children. In 1892, the family moved to Dunedin, New Zealand, where Charles found a role as a teacher of classic and modern languages, as he could reportedly speak seventeen languages. He also taught music, and became arts critic for Otago Daily Times. Around this time, Baeyertz founded The Triad, a popular literature magazine, which he edited and co-owned for 32 years and remained his chief source of income. The family moved to Australia in 1913 and then in 1915 Baeyertz fathered a son with Lily Agnes Price, outside his marriage. By 1919, Isabella Baeyertz was living back in New Zealand and when she died in February 1929, it allowed Baeyertz to marry Lily Price, which he did in September 1930.

In 1925, Baeyertz became editor of the Sydney The Sunday Times. He went on to teach elocution at the Australian Broadcast Commission, as well as doing some broadcasting himself. He wrote a tourist guide to New Zealand and a number of books on public speaking. Baeyertz died at Rylstone, New South Wales on 5 June 1943.

== The Triad ==
Baeyertz founded The Triad in April 1893, a monthly journal focused originally on music, art and science and subsequently on literature. The journal had a circulation of 10,000 by 1897, and by 1912 it could be found "in every club, hotel and reading-room throughout Australasia", regarded as the "most successful literary magazine" of the time. In 1914, the journal was co-edited with Frank Morton and moved from New Zealand to Australia, and by 1923 it included writers such as P. L. Travers, giving her an entire section called A Woman Hits Back.
