= Frank Morton (journalist) =

Australian journalist and poet (1869-1923)

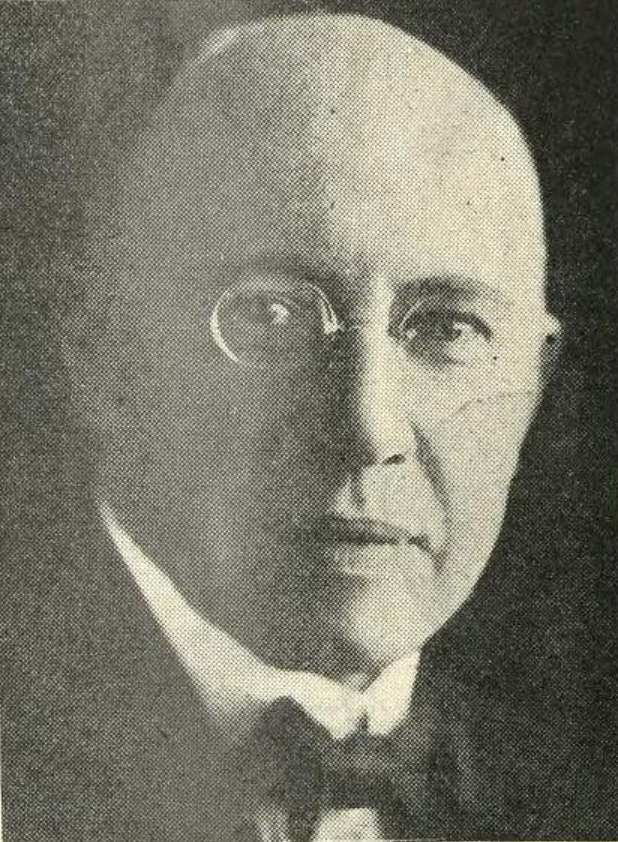
- Morton, date unknown
- Born: 12 May 1869
- Died: 15 December 1923 (aged 54)
- Occupation: Journalist; poet

Frank Morton (12 May 1869 – 15 December 1923) was a journalist and poet, active in Australia.

Morton was born at Bromley, Kent, England, the son of James Morton, a plumber, and his wife Rhoda, née Hookham. He was educated at a private school at Stoke-on-Trent, Staffordshire, where he obtained a good grounding in the classics and French.

== Writing career ==
At 16 years of age Morton migrated to Sydney with his family. Early in 1889 he obtained work as a seaman and sailed in the Conqueror for America but left the ship at Hong Kong. He was a teacher there for a few months, and at the end of the year obtained work on The Straits Times. In 1892 he went to Calcutta and did editorial work on the Englishman.

Morton by David Low

In 1894 he returned to Australia. He worked for various papers in Victoria, New South Wales, Queensland and Tasmania for about 10 years before joining the staff of the Otago Daily Times in 1905. His most remarkable work in New Zealand, however, was his editing of a monthly journal, the Triad, of which he frequently wrote the greater part himself under various pen-names. In 1908 he published Laughter and Tears, Verses of a Journalist, at Wellington, and in 1909 The Angel of the Earthquake, prose sketches with a poem. The Yacht of Dreams, a novel, was published in 1911.

Morton returned to Australia about 1914 and contributed a significant amount of journalism, both prose and verse, to the Triad, The Bulletin, the Lone Hand, and others. His Verses for Marjorie and Some Others was published in September 1916, followed by The Secret Spring (1919), and Man and the Devil, a Book of Shame and Pity (1922). He was a friend of David McKee Wright. He lived at Manly, New South Wales, for some years and died of acute nephritis on 15 December 1923. In Singapore in 1891 he had married Louise Holloway, who survived him with three sons and two daughters. -Terence, Beaumont James, Marjorie and Enid. Marjorie's third son was Ian Ross, television news presenter. Beaumont's grandson Glenn Myles is also a journalist.

Morton was an excellent journalist, short story writer, and critic. J. F. Archibald regarded Morton as one of three journalists who "lifted journalism to the plane of literature". About six of his poems have been included in anthologies.

== Bibliography ==
- Laughter and Tears : Verses of a Journalist (1908) – poetry
- The Angel of the Earthquake (1909) – novella
- Verses for Marjorie and Some Others (1916) – poetry
- The Secret Spring (1919) – poetry
- Man and the Devil (1922) – poetry
