= Adrienne Augarde =

English actress and singer

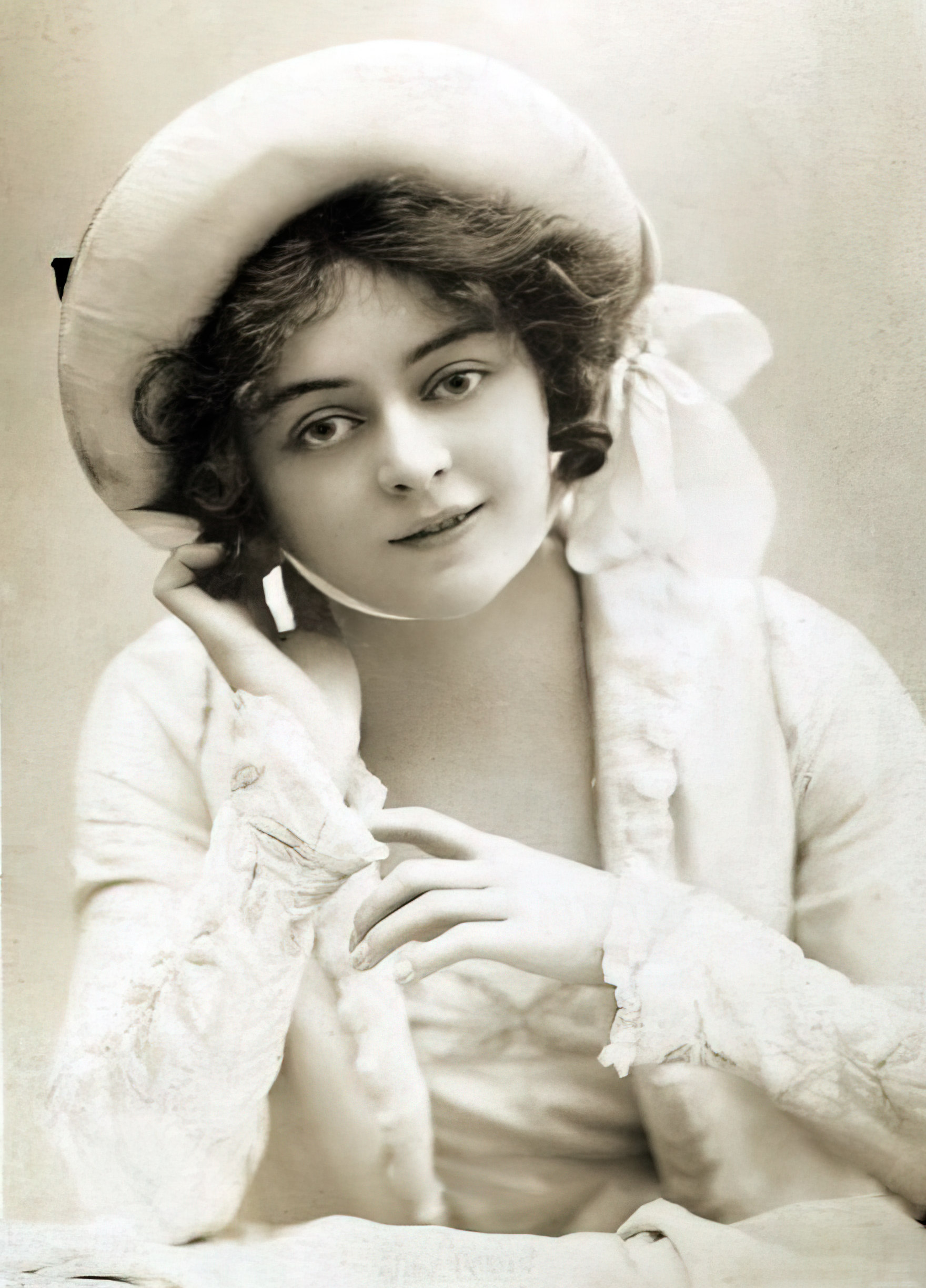
- Born: 12 May 1882; Westminster, London, England, U.K.
- Died: 17 March 1913 (aged 30); Chicago, Illinois, U.S.
- Occupations: Actress and singer
- Years active: 1898–1913
- Relatives: Amy Augarde (aunt)

Adrienne Adele Augarde (12 May 1882 – 17 March 1913) was an English actress and singer popular for nearly a decade on both sides of the Atlantic Ocean, primarily for her roles in Edwardian musical comedy.

She began her career in 1898 in pantomime and small roles in musical comedy and opera, before gaining wide popularity playing leading roles in the popular musicals produced by George Edwardes. She also appeared in a few dramas. After starring in a number of long-running productions in London and New York from 1903 to 1912, Augarde embarked on an American vaudeville tour. During the tour, she fell ill and died, after a failed appendectomy, at the age of 30.

== Early life and career ==
Augarde was born in Westminster, London, the first child and only daughter of Frank Wells Augarde, a violinist, and his wife Henrietta Catherine (née Van Achter), a Belgian singer. She had a younger brother, Augustus. The Augardes came from a long theatrical and musical tradition. Members of the family included John Vernham (died 1921), an organist of St Paul's Church, Knightsbridge; Augustus Wells Augarde (1865–1946), a clarinettist in the London Symphony Orchestra; Louise Adele Augarde (later King, 1863–1909), a contralto in the D'Oyly Carte Opera Company chorus; and Amy Augarde, a musical comedy actress. The last two were Adrienne Augarde's aunts.

In November 1898 Augarde was cast by the impresario J Pitt Hardacre as Miss Muffet, principal girl in the pantomime Red Riding Hood, which starred George Robey. In the following year she appeared in Edwardian musical comedy Little Miss Nobody, by Harry Graham and Arthur E. Godfrey, in London and on tour, in the role of Maggie. The correspondent of The Stage wrote, "a most winsome young lady, and charmingly does she act and sing. If we mistake not, she will come well to the front." In 1900 she appeared in the first touring production of the hit musical comedy Florodora as Angela Gilfain; her aunt Amy Augarde played Dolores. The theatrical newspaper The Era said, "Miss Adrienne Augarde enhanced the high opinion already held here of her abilities, and sang and danced with an entire absence of theatrical affectation." She later joined the chorus of the J. W. Turner Opera Company, where her father was leader of the orchestra for many years. She soon rose to assume principal parts.

== Starring roles in the West End ==
In 1903 Augarde appeared at the Gaiety Theatre in London's West End as a replacement player in the role of Dora in the hit musical comedy The Toreador, produced by George Edwardes. Not long afterwards, at the Lyric Theatre, she played Renée, an ingenue part in another Edwardes musical, The Duchess of Dantzic, which ran for 236 performances. W. J. MacQueen-Pope described her as "petite, wide-eyed, sweet-voiced and wistful" in the role. The following year she created the title role in Lady Madcap, with a book by Nathaniel Newnham-Davis, music by Paul Rubens and lyrics by Percy Greenbank and Rubens, at the Prince of Wales Theatre, London.

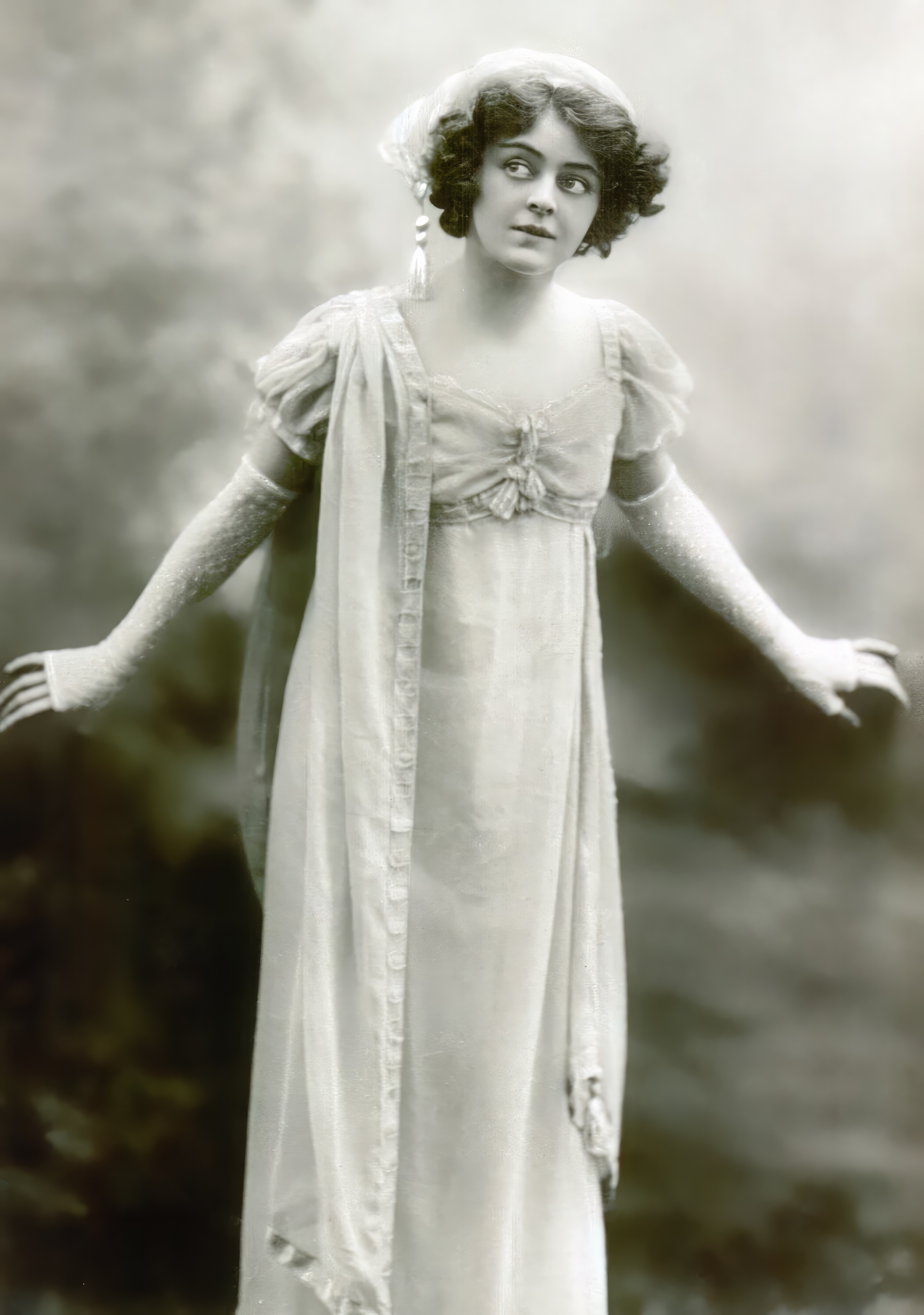
Augarde in 1905

Augarde soon left the cast of Lady Madcap to travel to America where, on 16 January 1905, she made her Broadway debut at Daly's Theatre with the original London cast of The Duchess of Dantzic. After a four-month run in New York she returned to London to play Blanche-Marie, one of the title roles in a highly successful English adaptation of the André Messager operetta, Les p'tites Michu (The Little Michus) that ran for 401 performances in 1905–06. Another leading member of the cast was Augarde's aunt Amy, playing Blanche-Marie's mother.

She next appeared in mid-1906 at the Prince of Wales Theatre in See-See, an Edwardes musical set in China, composed by Sidney Jones with lyrics by Adrian Ross and a book by Charles Brookfield. During the run of the show, Augarde and her aunt Amy appeared in a charity matinée of Trial by Jury at the Theatre Royal, Drury Lane, along with stars such as Rutland Barrington, Henry Lytton, Courtice Pounds and Gertie Millar, with W.S. Gilbert as the Associate. Later in 1906, Augarde created the role of the Princess in The New Aladdin, another Edwardes show at the Gaiety Theatre. In 1907 she appeared at the Lyric Theatre in the role of Lady Betty Noel in Tom Taylor's historical drama Clancarty, and later that year, at Drury Lane, Augarde played Gwendolyn Ashley in The Sins of Society by Cecil Raleigh and Henry Hamilton. In 1908, at His Majesty's Theatre, she played Rosa Budd in a stage adaptation of The Mystery of Edwin Drood.

== Last years ==
Augarde made several subsequent trips to America. In the Christmas season of 1908–09 she starred in the title role of Peggy Machree, a light opera with a romantic Irish theme, at the now-demolished Broadway Theatre, on 41st Street. The London Evening News reported that she had become engaged to be married to the manager of the theatre, A W Dingwall. Her greatest American success was as Daisy in the Broadway version of The Dollar Princess, with music by Leo Fall and Jerome Kern and a libretto by George Grossmith, Jr. The musical ran for 250 performances at the Knickerbocker Theatre in 1909–10. In 1912 she played Daphne in The Rose Maid, a light opera by Harry B. Smith and Raymond Peck, that ran at New York's Globe Theatre for 181 performances.

In the autumn of 1912, Augarde embarked on a vaudeville tour that began in California and eventually made its way east. She was featured in a one-act playlet entitled A Matter of Duty, written by Agnes Burton.

While the show was playing at the Majestic Theater, in Chicago, Illinois, in March 1913, Augarde was stricken with an attack of appendicitis and died a short time later after a failed operation. She was 30 years old. Her funeral was in Chicago on 21 March 1913. Her ashes were later sent to her mother in an urn designed to resemble a make-up box.

== Sources ==
- Sardeson, Sandra (1999). Born to Music: The Story of the Augarde Family in England. Sleaford UK: Heritage Lincolnshire. ISBN 0948639253.
