= Jack Cannot =

John Valentine Cannot
- Born: John Valentine Cannot; 1883; England
- Died: 2 August 1929 (aged 45–46); Maroubra Beach

John Valentine Cannot (pron. CAN-oh), better known as Jack Cannot (1883–1929), was an English-Australian comic of stage and screen.

== Biography ==
He was born in England and eventually went to South Africa where he toured for two years in various stage productions, including The Merry Widow. He then moved to Australia in 1910 under contract to J. C. Williamson Ltd. They used him in pantomimes such as Jack and the Beanstalk as well as various musical comedies.

=== Death ===
The advent of talking films made it more difficult for him to find work and he was in financial distress. Cannot later killed himself with strychnine at Maroubra Beach.

He left behind a suicide letter to Charles Dunn, secretary of the Actor's Federation:

My dear Old Charlie,

When you get this it will be a case of "Alas, poor Yorick", and I want you to do your best for my family, who will be more or less destitute. I have fought against doing what I intend to do. That it is the only way I can see clear to enable my children to get a proper education and my darling wife to feel that every postman's knock doesn't contain a summons.

Charles, I have the greatest wife and children a man could wish for, so you can guess with what heart yearnings I am leaving all I love best, but I cannot get decent work: I have done 28 weeks in two years, and then I got 'scaled' for £70 in a pantomime.

Now, old sport, you and Walter — God bless you both — will you do what you can for my loved ones, especially my boy. Oh, what a grand little fellow, and how I worship the ground he walks on. He has been at college since he was nine years old, and he is 14 and two months now. I am behind with his schooling fees.

If you read this letter before they find me I would like a decent burial.

We owe at least 15 weeks' rent, but here again we have a wonderful woman for a landlady. If It hadn't been for her we should have been destitute weeks back.

My daughter Betty is fust a sweet angel, and I owe her fees at school, too.

I've earned £66 since "Clowns in Clover" finished, and I am doing this really to get out of the way, as I haven't the money to go abroad or anything. I was going to start a school of singing with the aid of a friend, but I feel that it's no go before we open. So that's that.

So long, Old Pal, if I have helped to make things easier for the profession, then I am glad, although I believe I have suffered in consequence.

God bless you all.

JACK CANNOT

Vice-President, Actors' Federation
