= Irene Bentley =

American actress

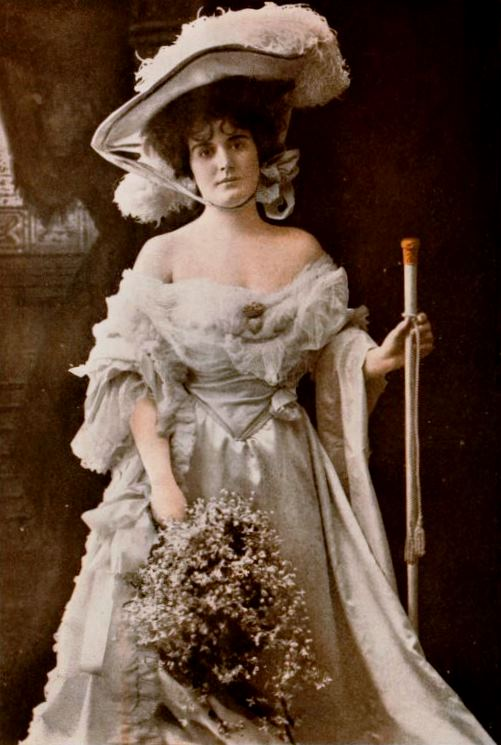
- 1908
- Born: 1870; Baltimore, Maryland, U.S.
- Died: June 3, 1940 (age 70); Allenhurst, New Jersey, U.S.
- Occupation: Actress
- Years active: 1894-1910
- Spouses: James Thomas Sothoron Jr. (divorced 1906); Harry B. Smith (m. 1906)

Irene Bentley (1870 – June 3, 1940) was an American stage actress and vocalist. A native of Baltimore, Maryland, she made her stage debut in 1894 as Sally Vation in the musical New Dazzler. She had a prominent career in Broadway musicals from her debut on the New York stage in 1895 until her retirement 15 years laters. She also performed in London's West End during that period. Her second marriage was to librettist Harry B. Smith.

== Biography ==
The daughter of William H. Bentley and Alexina Mabee Bentley, Irene Bentley was born in Baltimore, Maryland in 1870. Prior to her professional stage career she married her first husband, J. T. Sothoron, and appeared in amateur theatricals in Baltimore as Mrs. Irene Bentley Sotheron. She began her stage career in 1894 as Sally Vation in the touring show New Dazzler. Her New York debut came in April 1895 when she performed in Little Christopher in Palmer's Theatre in New York.

Bentley went on to become "a major stage star in New York and London". She made her London debut in 1898 at the Shaftesbury Theatre as Gladys Glee in The Belle of New York. She was a busy actress in musicals on Broadway at the very end of the nineteenth century and the first decade of the twentieth century. In 1899 and 1900 she appeared at the Casino Theatre as Angelique in composer Ludwig Englander's The Rounders. She appeared at that same theatre in several more musicals, including The Merry World (1895), The Casino Girl (1900, Lotta Rocks), The Belle of Bohemia (1900, as Geraldine McDuffy), and The Mimic World (1908, as Sonia).

At the Knickerbocker Theatre Bentley performed in The Strollers (1901, as Bertha) and The Wild Rose (1902, as Rose Romany). In the latter musical she performed with Marie Cahill whom she also appeared with in Sally in Our Alley. In 1903-1904 Bentley portrayed Kitty Calvert in The Girl from Dixie at Hoyt's Theatre. In 1906-1907 she performed the role of H.S.H. Princess Carl of Ehbreneitstein in The Belle of Mayfair at Daly's Theatre. Her other performance credits included It Happened in Nordland. She retired from the stage in 1910.

=== Niece ===
A niece of her second husband, Harry B. Smith, used Irene Bentley's name to become a film actress. Hence there are two actresses named Irene Bentley when perusing film or stage biographies. The younger Irene Bentley was born in 1904 and died in 1965, and appeared in films such as My Weakness (1933), Smoky (1933), and Frontier Marshal (1934).

== Personal life and death ==
Bantley married librettist Harry B. Smith. This was her second marriage. She died at her home in Allenhurst, New Jersey, on June 3, 1940, aged 70.
