= D. Frank Dodge =

American scenic designer

D. Frank Dodge (died April 24, 1952, Burlingame, California) was an American scenic designer who had a prolific career on Broadway from the 1890s into the early 1920s. Theatre historian Gerald Bordman in The Concise Oxford Companion to American Theatre stated that Dodge was "one of the busiest turn‐of‐the‐century set designers" who "specialized in colorful settings for musicals".

== Life and career ==
A native of California, Dodge came to New York City in the early 1890s and first drew attention for his sets for the original 1894 version of the musical revue The Passing Show. After this, he designed sets for more than 80 Broadway shows over the next 26 years. Several of these were created in collaboration with fellow designer William E. Castle with whom he co-founded the design studio Dodge and Castle.

D. Frank Dodge died in Burlingame, California on April 24, 1952.

== Partial list of Broadway productions ==
- Gismonda (1894, Fifth Avenue Theatre)
- The Belle of New York (1897, Casino Theatre)
- La belle Hélène (1899, Casino Theatre)
- The Man in the Moon (1899, New York Theatre)
- Broadway to Tokio (1900, New York Theatre)
- The Casino Girl (1900, Casino Theatre)
- The Strollers (1901, Knickerbocker Theatre)
- The New Yorkers (1901, Herald Square Theatre)
- A Chinese Honeymoon (1902, Casino Theatre; revived 1904, Academy of Music)
- Tommy Rot (1902, Mrs. Osborn's Playhouse)
- Sally in Our Alley (1902, Broadway Theatre)
- The Earl and the Girl (1905, Casino Theatre)
- A Knight for a Day (1908, Wallack's Theatre)
- The-Merry-Go-Round (1908, Circle Theatre)
- All for the Ladies (1912, Lyric Theatre)
- Sweethearts (1913, New Amsterdam Theatre)
- The Crinoline Girl (1914, Knickerbocker Theatre)
- The Little Blue Devil (1919, Central Theater)
- Kissing Time (1920, Lyric Theatre)
