= Caroline Siedle =

English designer

Caroline F. Siedle (1867 – February 26, 1907) was a costume designer on Broadway. She was one of earliest designers to receive credit for her work in theater programs, as well as the first woman in the United States to consistently receive professional billing as a designer.

== Personal life ==
Caroline Siedle was born in London, England. She moved to New York when she married Edward Siedle, who was properties master for the Metropolitan Opera.

She died on February 26, 1907, at her home in Ludlow Park, Yonkers, of pneumonia, after being ill for four days. She was about 40 and had one nineteen-year-old child at the time of her death.

== Career ==
Little is known about Siedle's early life or training. After marrying Edward, she established an atelier in NY to serve the theatre trade. She began designing costumes when she was 22.

She designed 58 musicals on Broadway, 48 of which listed her as the single designer. She designed costumes for most of the musical productions on Broadway from 1901 to 1907.

In the later years of the nineteenth century in the US, company managers usually selected costumes for a show. They were often pulled from a rental house rather than designed. Very few designers who specialized in costumes were recognized. Siedle was one of the few who were. She was sometimes even credited on the title page of a playbill rather than in the back.

Siedle worked in the theatre when British pantomime and Viennese operettas were still being produced, but American musical comedies were becoming increasingly popular. She worked with Ziegfeld, Lew Fields, Charles Frohman, and the Shuberts. She worked with scene designers such as Homer Emens, Ernest M. Gros, Frank Dodge, Ernest Albert, Joseph A. Physioc, and Francis Gates and Richard Gates.

Siedle worked on thirteen productions with Julian Mitchell. Upon her death, Mitchell said, "Death in removing Mrs. Siedle, has deprived me of the helper who enabled me to make my reputation. Without her assistance I should never have been able to carry out the musical comedy color schemes which have made beautiful stage pictures. Her taste was always good, and her ability to design amounted to genius."

== Costume Designs ==
Siedle contributed to America's visual culture with her designs for the spectacular, first musical version of The Wizard of Oz (1903) and for Victor Herbert's fantasy Babes in Toyland (1903).

Another memorable design was for the musical comedy Piff! Paff!! Pouf!!! (1904) with its "Radium Ballet". For that novelty, the white, frilly dresses of the eight "Pony Ballet" girls glowed "like gigantic fire-flies" when the auditorium was darkened. Their costumes were illuminated by discs of phosphorus and they danced with phosphorescent skipping ropes. It became a worldwide theatrical sensation.

Other influential designs included those for the opera Dolly Varden (1902), which re-popularized 1730s-style silhouettes, and designs based on contemporary dress, such as The Belle of New York (1897), and the Marie Cahill vehicle Sally in Our Alley (1902).

Other shows she designed for include:

- The Jolly Musketeer, staged by Richard Barker around 1899, featured costumes made by Dazian, "The famous costumer of New York", from sketches made by Caroline F. Siedle. Properties were contributed by Edward Siedle of the Metropolitan Opera. Music was by Julian Edwards.
- The Man in the Moon (1899)
- Broadway to Tokio (1900)
- The New Yorkers (1901)
- The Strollers (1901)
- The King's Carnival (1901)
- The Little Duchess (1901)
- The Emerald Isle (1902), directed by R. H. Burnside and starring Jerrerson De Angelis.
- Nancy Brown (1903)
- It Happened in Nordland (1904)
- Wonderland (1905)
- A Parisian Model (1906)
- The Red Mill (1906)
- The Tattooed Man (1907)
- The White Hen (1907)
- About Town (1906)
- Dream City (1906)
- The Rich Mr. Hoggenheimer (1906)
