= Mayme Gehrue =

American actress and dancer

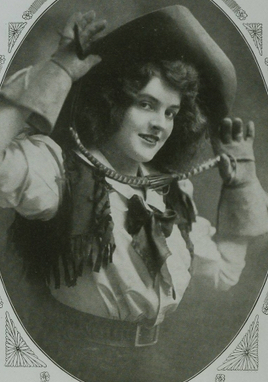
- Mayme Gehrue, from a 1909 publicity photograph
- Born: c. 1880; Louisville, Kentucky, U.S.
- Other names: May Gehrue; Mame Gehrue; Mamie Gehrue; Mayme Gehrue Ford; Mayme Gerhue
- Occupations: Actress; dancer; singer; lyricist
- Known for: Musical theatre, Vaudeville
- Spouse: Johnny Ford (divorced)

Mayme Gehrue (born c. 1880, died after May 1929) was an American actress and dancer in musical theatre, vaudeville, and silent film.

== Early life ==
Gehrue was born in Louisville, Kentucky. The date 1883 is often given for her birth, but is questionable, considering that she was touring in shows by the mid-1890s. She was in a touring dance act as a teen, with her sister Daisy Gehrue, before Daisy married.

== Career ==
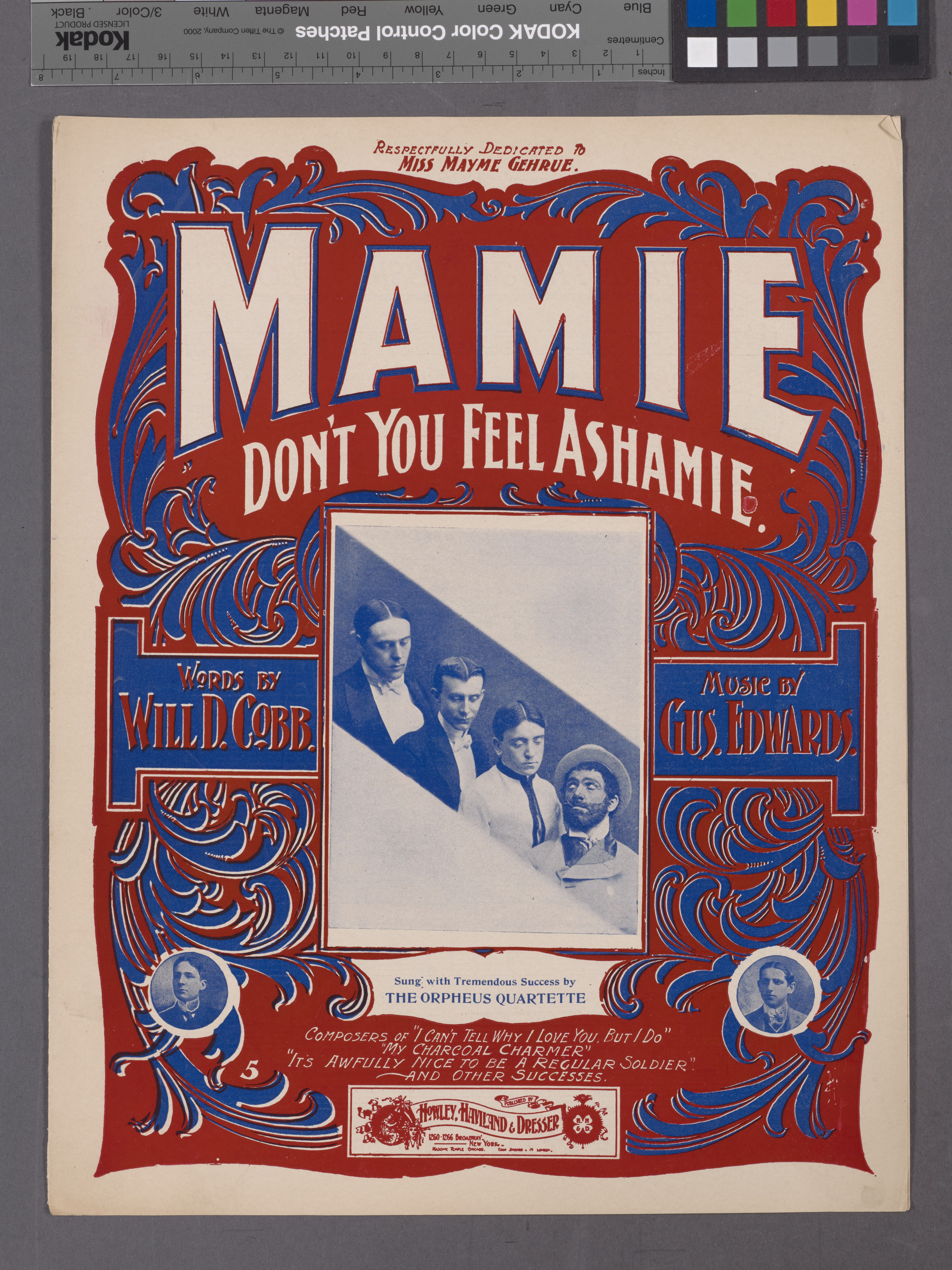
Sheet music from a song dedicated to Mayme Gehrue, from the New York Public Library collection.

Gehrue appeared on Broadway in Little Red Riding Hood (1900), The Casino Girl (1900), Nell-Go-In (1900), The Giddy Throng (1901), The King's Carnival (1901), Hoity Toity (1901–1902), Lovers and Lunatics (1906), The Deacon and the Lady (1910), and The Opera Ball (1912). She also toured with The Ford Dancers, as "the Yama-Yama Girl" in Three Twins (1910–1911), and in Topsy and Eva (1923), a musical comedy based on Uncle Tom's Cabin. She was frequently on the vaudeville stage well into the late 1920s, in the United States and abroad, including a tour in Australia; "to-day she is recognized as one of America's foremost dancing comediennes," noted a 1909 report.

Gehrue appeared in two silent films, The Fable of the Galloping Pilgrim Who Kept on Galloping (1915, short) and Above the Abyss (1915). She wrote the lyrics to several World War I-era songs, including "I'm Leaving France for my Old Kentucky Home", "I Wish to Wed a Sammy", "Military Band", "The Man of the Hour", "Dear Little Jessamine", "Over in Spain", and "Back Down South", all with music by Victor Hammond.

== Personal life ==
Gehrue recommended buttermilk, meat, and no corsets for a healthy physique. She married and divorced her vaudeville dance partner Johnny Ford (he later married and divorced vaudeville star Eva Tanguay).
