= The Strollers =

The Strollers is a musical in two acts and a prologue with music by Ludwig Engländer and a book and lyrics by Harry B. Smith. Set in Austria, the work is based on Leopold Krenn and Karl Lindau's libretto for the 1899 operetta Die Landstreicher by the composer Carl Michael Ziehrer. The work premiered on Broadway at the Knickerbocker Theatre on June 24, 1901. It closed at that theatre on August 31, 1901 after 70 performances. The Broadway production was directed by A. M. Holbrook and produced by George W. Lederer, Sam Nixon and J. Fred Zimmerman. The sets were designed by D. Frank Dodge and Ernest Albert, and the costumes were designed by Caroline Siedle. The production starred Francis Wilson as August Lump, Irene Bentley as Bertha, Eddie Foy as Kamfer, Marie George as Mimi, Harry Gilfoil as the Prince de Bomsky, Wilmer Bentley as Rudi von Rodenstein, and Louise Lawton as Anna.

== Plot ==
Two strollers, August Lump and his wife Bertha, discover a letter with a diamond necklace. When they use their finding to pay for a dinner, they arouse suspicions and are arrested by the police. They are imprisoned in a jail run by Kamfer. It is revealed that that letter and necklace were lost by the Prince de Bomsky and was a gift intended for his girlfriend, the ballet dancer Mimi. August and Bertha lure the Prince de Bomsky and Mimi into their cell and trick them into making their escape; still in possession of the necklace. Eventually the two couples run across each other again in a hotel at a mountain resort. A comedy of errors ensues involving mistaken identities and various deceptions. Eventually all ends well and the Prince presents Mimi with the necklace.
