= Ernest Albert =

American painter, illustrator, muralist and scenic designer

Ernest Albert, born Ernest Albert Brown, (August 15, 1857 – March 25, 1946) was an American painter, illustrator, muralist, and scenic designer. He was a prolific scenic designer, first in St. Louis and Chicago and then on Broadway. He is considered a major American landscape painter and was elected the first president of the Allied Artists of America in 1919.

== Early life and education ==
Ernest Albert was born in Brooklyn on August 15, 1857. His birth name was Ernest Albert Brown, but as an artist he was known as Ernest Albert. His parents were Daniel Webster Brown and Harriet Dunn ( Smith ) Brown. His father was a clothing retailer. At the age of 15 he began studies with at the Montague Art School with John Barnard Whittaker (1836–1926). He concurrently studied at the Brooklyn Art Institute as a teenager. While a student at those schools, he won the Graham Art Medal at the age of 15. At the age of 16 he began an apprenticeship in scenic painting.

== Early career in St. Louis and Chicago ==
In 1880 Albert moved to St. Louis to take up a position as the resident art director and scenic designer at Pope's Theatre. One of the many productions he designed for at the theatre was for the premiere of Charles E. Verner's Eviction (1881). In 1883 he joined the design firm of Joe Toomey and Tom Noxon; at which point the firm became known as Noxon, Albert & Toomey. While St. Louis based, the design firm had a national presence and worked in other cities in the United States. Albert's initial work in the firm was as designer for the Grand Opera House and Olympia Theatre in St. Louis.

After five years in St. Louis, Albert relocated to Chicago where he continued to work as a scenic designer and painter with Noxon, Albert & Toomey. In 1885 he was the resident scenic designer at the Grand Opera House, Chicago; and continued to design for this theatre in successive years while also designing for other Chicago playhouses like the Haymarket Theatre. He notably designed the interior of this latter theatre when it was built in 1887. In 1888 he redesigned the interior of the Grand Opera House when it was remodeled. In 1889 he had a major critical triumph at the Grand Opera House with his sets for the premiere of Clay M. Greene's Blue Beard, Jr.; a production which toured nationally including stops at Boston's Tremont Theatre (1889) and Broadway's Niblo's Garden (1890). In 1890 he designed sets for The Mikado at the Chicago Auditorium.

Albert also designed for theaters in other cities with Noxon, Albert & Toomey such as Buffalo, New York, and St. Louis. He designed several sets for Lawrence Barrett and Edwin Booth's touring company in the mid to late 1880s; drawing particular praise from New York City and Boston critics for his designs for the William Shakespeare plays Othello, The Merchant of Venice, and Julius Caesar. In 1890 he designed the sets for the West End revival of Watts Phillips' The Dead Heart at the Lyceum Theatre, London. He designed sets for two touring plays which starred the actor William H. Crane in the early 1890s: David D. Lloyd and Sydney Rosenfeld's The Senator and Augustus Thomas's For Money.

Albert dissolved his partnership with Noxon and Toomey when he formed a new design firm, Albert, Grover & Burridge, with Walter Burridge and O.D. Grover in January 1892. In 1892 he participated in the planning of the World's Columbian Exposition; taking on the responsibility for choosing paint colors for the exposition's buildings. He was a founding member of the Chicago chapter of the American Society of Scenic Painters.

== Later career ==
Albert returned to New York City, and began a prolific career as a scenic designer for Broadway productions with Victorien Sardou's 1894 play Gismonda. He designed sets for more than 100 Broadway shows from 1894 through 1918; with his last work for the Broadway stage being the sets for The Better 'Ole (1918). He also continued to design for productions outside of New York. In 1899 he designed the sets for the theatre troop of the Rogers Brothers; including the play A Reign of Terror by playwright John J. McNally (1852–1931).

In 1916 Albert moved to New Canaan, Connecticut, and the last 30 years of his life were spent dedicated almost entirely to landscape painting; a pursuit he had begun earlier around the turn of the century. He participated in numerous exhibitions both nationally and internationally during his career. His artwork is included in the collections of the Florence Griswold Museum and the Wadsworth Atheneum.

Ernest Albert died on March 25, 1946, in New Canaan, Connecticut, at the age of 88.

== Broadway set designs ==
- Gismonda (premiere, December 11, 1894, Fifth Avenue Theatre)
- The Wizard of the Nile (premiere November 4, 1895, Casino Theatre)
- The Wedding Day (premiere April 8, 1897, Casino Theatre)
- The Belle of New York (premiere September 28, 1897, Casino Theatre; revived in 1900)
- The White Heather (premiere November 22, 1897, Academy of Music)
- In Gay Paree (premiere March 20, 1899, Casino Theatre)
- The Man in the Moon (premiere April 24, 1899, New York Theatre)
- Ben-Hur (premiere November 29, 1899)
- Broadway to Tokio (premiere January 23, 1900, New York Theatre)
- Sapho (premiere February 5, 1900, Wallack's Theatre)
- The Casino Girl (premiere March 19, 1900, Casino Theatre)
- The Belle of Bohemia (premiere September 24, 1900, Casino Theatre)
- Sag Harbor (premiere September 27, 1900, Republic Theatre)
- The Moment of Death (premiere October 8, 1900, Wallack's Theatre)
- The Greatest Thing in the World (premiere October 8, 1900, Wallack's Theatre)
- The Girl from Up There (premiere January 7, 1901, Herald Square Theatre)
- When Knighthood Was in Flower (premiere January 14, 1901, Criterion Theatre)
- The Climbers (premiere January 21, 1901, Bijou Theatre)
- Vienna Life (premiere January 23, 1901, Broadway Theatre)
- The Strollers (premiere June 24, 1901, Knickerbocker Theatre)
- The Liberty Belles (premiere September 30, 1901, Hoyt's Theatre)
- The New Yorkers (premiere October 7, 1901, Herald Square Theatre)
- The Little Duchess (premiere October 14, 1901, Casino Theatre)
- The Silver Slipper (premiere October 27, 1902, Broadway Theatre) ·
- The Billionaire (premiere December 29, 1902, Daly's Theatre)
- Mr. Bluebeard (premiere January 21, 1903, Knickerbocker Theatre)
- The Jewel of Asia (premiere February 16, 1903, Criterion Theatre)
- The Rogers Brothers in London (premiere September 7, 1903, Knickerbocker Theatre)
- The Fisher Maiden (premiere October 5, 1903, Victoria Theatre)
- Red Feather (premiere November 9, 1903, Lyric Theatre)
- Mam'selle Napoleon (premiere December 8, 1903, Knickerbocker Theatre)
- The Virginian (premiere January 5, 1904, Manhattan Theatre)
- The Man from China (premiere May 2, 1904, Majestic Theatre)
- Higgledy-Piggledy (premiere October 20, 1904, Weber's Music Hall)
- The Errand Boy (premiere October 31, 1904, Fourteenth Street Theatre)
- A China Doll (premiere, November 19, 1904, Majestic Theatre)
- The Usurper (premiere, November 28, 1904, Knickerbocker Theatre)
- The Winter's Tale (revival, premiered December 26, 1904, Knickerbocker Theatre)
- In Newport (premiered December 26, 1904, Liberty Theatre)
- Once Upon a Time (premiere January 2, 1905, Berkeley Lyceum Theatre)
- The Prodigal Son (premiere Sep 4, 1905, New Amsterdam Theatre)
- Happyland (premiere October 2, 1905, Lyric Theatre)
- The Earl and the Girl (premiere, November 4, 1905, Casino Theatre)
- The Gingerbread Man (premiere December 25, 1905, Liberty Theatre)
- Forty-five Minutes from Broadway (premiere January 1, 1906, New Amsterdam Theatre)
- Twiddle-Twaddle (premiere January 1, 1906, Weber's Music Hall)
- Coming Thro' the Rye (premiere January 9, 1906, Herald Square Theatre)
- Happy Hooligan's Trip Around the World (premiere January 22, 1906, Murray Hill Theatre)
- Gay New York (premiere February 5, 1906, Murray Hill Theatre)
- Gallops (premiere February 12, 1906, Garrick Theatre)
- George Washington, Jr. (premiere February 12, 1906, Herald Square Theatre)
- Abyssinia (premiere February 20, 1906, Majestic Theatre)
- Lincoln (premiere March 26, 1906, Liberty Theatre)
- The Free Lance (premiere Apr 16, 1906, New Amsterdam Theatre)
- Around the Clock (premiere October 29, 1906, American Theatre)
- The Blue Moon (premiere November 3, 1906, Casino Theatre)
- A Parisian Model (premiered November 27, 1906, Broadway Theatre)
- Dream City (premiere December 24, 1906, Weber's Music Hall)
- Brewster's Millions (premiere December 31, 1906, New Amsterdam Theatre)
- Princess Beggar (premiere January 7, 1907, Casino Theatre)
- The Girl and the Governor (premiere February 4, 1907, Manhattan Theatre)
- The White Hen (premiere February 16, 1907, Casino Theatre)
- The Grand Mogul (premiere March 25, 1907, New Amsterdam Theatre)
- The Shoo-Fly Regiment (premiere June 3, 1907, Grand Opera House)
- The Rogers Brothers in Panama (premiere September 2, 1907, Broadway Theatre)
- Hip! Hip! Hooray! (premiere October 10, 1907, Weber's Music Hall)
- The Soul Kiss (premiere January 28, 1908, New York Theatre)
- Fifty Miles from Boston (premiere February 3, 1908, Garrick Theatre)
- The Gay Musician (premiere May 18, 1908, Wallack's Theatre)
- Cohan and Harris Minstrels of 1908 (premiere August 3, 1908, New York Theatre)
- Algeria (premiere August 31, 1908, Broadway Theatre)
- The Golden Butterfly (premiere October 12, 1908, Broadway Theatre)
- Little Nemo (premiere October 20, 1908, New Amsterdam Theatre)
- Miss Innocence (premiere November 30, 1908, New York Theatre)
- The Writing on the Wall (premiere April 26, 1909, Savoy Theatre)
- Cohan and Harris Minstrels of 1909 (premiere August 16, 1909, New York Theatre)
- The Rose of Algeria (premiere September 20, 1909, Herald Square Theatre)
- The Man Who Owns Broadway (premiere October 11, 1909, New York Theatre)
- The Silver Star (premiere November 1, 1909, New Amsterdam Theatre)
- Antony and Cleopatra (revival premiere, November 8, 1909, New Theatre)
- The Goddess of Liberty (premiere December 22, 1909, Weber's Music Hall)
- Madame Sherry (premiere August 30, 1910, New Amsterdam Theatre)
- The Inferior Sex (premiere October 17, 1910, Maxine Elliott's Theatre)
- The Bachelor Belles (premiere November 7, 1910, Globe Theatre)
- The Happiest Night of His Life (February 20, 1911, Criterion Theatre)
- The Pink Lady (premiere March 13, 1911, New Amsterdam Theatre)
- Ziegfeld Follies of 1911 (premiere June 26, 1911, Jardin de Paris)
- Gypsy Love (premiere October 17, 1911, Globe Theatre)
- The Red Widow (premiere Nov 6, 1911, Astor Theatre)
- Peggy (premiere December 7, 1911, Casino Theatre)
- Baron Trenck (premiere March 11, 1912, Casino Theatre)
- A Winsome Widow (premiered April 11, 1912, Moulin Rouge)
- Ziegfeld Follies of 1912 (premiere October 21, 1912, Jardin de Paris)
- The Sunshine Girl (premiere February 3, 1913, Knickerbocker Theatre)
- Ziegfeld Follies of 1913 (premiere June 16, 1913, Jardin de Paris)
- Iole (premiere December 29, 1913, Longacre Theatre)
- Papa's Darling (premiere November 2, 1914, New Amsterdam Theatre)
- Hands Up (premiere July 22, 1915, 44th Street Theatre)
- Hip! Hip! Hooray! (premiere September 30, 1915, New York Hippodrome)
- The Big Show (premiere August 31, 1916, New York Hippodrome)
- Jack O'Lantern (premiere October 16, 1917, Globe Theatre)
- The Better 'Ole, (premiere October 19, 1918, Greenwich Village Theatre)

== Bibliography ==
- Ankerich, Michael G. (2013). Mae Murray: The Girl with the Bee-Stung Lips. University Press of Kentucky. ISBN 9780813136912.
- Frederick Baekeland (1998). Roads Less Traveled: American Paintings, 1833-1935. Herbert F. Johnson Museum of Art, Cornell University Press.
- Bloom, Ken (1996). American Song: A-S. Schirmer Books. ISBN 9780028645735.
- Bordman, Gerald Martin; Norton, Richard (2010). American Musical Theatre: A Chronicle. Oxford University Press. ISBN 9780199729708.
- Brideson, Cynthia; Brideson, Sara (2015). Ziegfeld and His Follies: A Biography of Broadway's Greatest Producer. University Press of Kentucky. ISBN 9780813160900.
- Clarke, Norman (1968). The Mighty Hippodrome. A. S. Barnes. ISBN 9780498066139.
- Dearinger, Kevin Lane (2016). Clyde Fitch and the American Theatre: An Olive in the Cocktail. Fairleigh Dickinson University Press. ISBN 9781611479485.
- Derby, George; White, James Terry, eds. (1950). "ALBERT, ERNEST (Ernest Albert Brown)". The National Cyclopædia of American Biography. Vol. 36. J. T. White Company.
- Denenberg, Thomas Andrew; Kurtz Lansing, Amy; Danly, Susan (2009). Call of the Coast: Art Colonies of New England. Portland Museum of Art.
- Dietz, Dan (2022). The Complete Book of 1900s Broadway Musicals. Rowman & Littlefield Publishers. ISBN 9781538168943.
- Fisher, James; Hardison Londré, Felicia (2017). Historical Dictionary of American Theater: Modernism. Rowman & Littlefield Publishers. ISBN 9781538107867.
- Franceschina, John (2004). Harry B. Smith: Dean of American Librettists. Taylor & Francis. ISBN 9781135949082.
- Gänzl, Kurt (1994). The Encyclopedia of the Musical Theatre, Volume 2. Schirmer Books. ISBN 9780028714455.
- Leonard, William T. (1981). Theatre: Stage to Screen to Television, Volume 2. Scarecrow Press. ISBN 9780810813748.
- Letellier, Robert Ignatius (2015). Operetta: A Sourcebook, Volume II. Cambridge Scholars Publishing. ISBN 9781443885089.
- Jasen, David A. (2004). Tin Pan Alley: An Encyclopedia of the Golden Age of American Song. Taylor & Francis. ISBN 9781135949013.
- Koke, Richard J., ed. (1982). "Ernest Albert". American Landscape and Genre Paintings in the New-York Historical Society: A Catalog of the Collection, Including Historical, Narrative, and Marine Art, Volume 1. New-York Historical Society. ISBN 9780816103645.
- Mantle, Burns; Sherwood, Garrison P.; Chapman, John Arthur (1944). The Best Plays of 1899-1909. Dodd, Mead & Co.
- Salem, James M. (1971). A Guide to Critical Reviews: The musical, 1909-1989. (3rd ed., 1991). Scarecrow Press. ISBN 9780810823877.
- Schwartz, Donald R.; Bowbeer, Anne A. (1997). Lillian Russell: A Bio-Bibliography. Bloomsbury Academic. ISBN 9780313277641.
- Shakespeare, William (1998). Madelaine, Richard (ed.). Antony and Cleopatra. Cambridge University Press. ISBN 9780521629041.
- Sherwood, Garrison P.; Chapman, L. John (1955). The Best Plays of 1894-1899. Dodd, Mead & Co.
- Solomon, Jon (2016). Ben-Hur: The Original Blockbuster. Edinburgh University Press. ISBN 9781474407960.
- Suskin, Steven (2000). Show Tunes: The Songs, Shows, and Careers of Broadway's Major Composers. Oxford University Press. ISBN 9780195125993.
- Woodworth, Christine; Osborne, Elizabeth A. (2015). Working in the Wings: New Perspectives on Theatre History and Labor. Southern Illinois University Press. ISBN 9780809334216.
