= Reginald De Koven =

American music critic and composer (1859–1920)

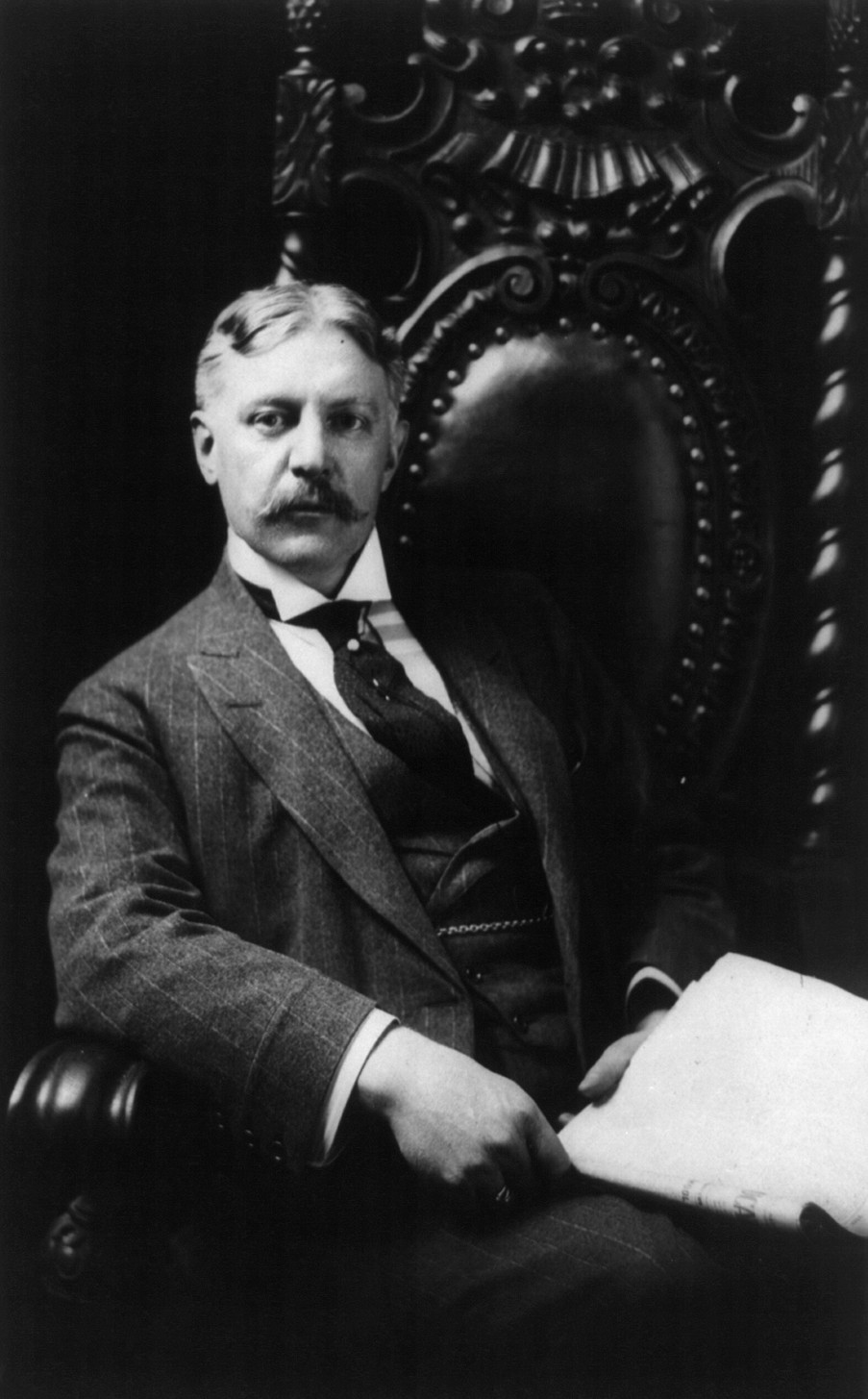
Reginald De Koven in 1904

Henry Louis Reginald De Koven (April 3, 1859 – January 16, 1920) was an American music critic and prolific composer, particularly of comic operas.

== Biography ==
De Koven was born in Middletown, Connecticut. His father was an Episcopal priest, as was his uncle, James DeKoven. He moved to Europe in 1870, where he received the majority of his education. He received a B.A. from St John's College, Oxford in 1880.

He undertook piano studies at Stuttgart Conservatory with Wilhelm Speidel, Sigmund Lebert, and Dionys Pruckner. He studied composition at Frankfurt with Johann Christian Hauff, and after staying there for six months moved on to Florence, Italy, where he studied singing with Luigi Vanuccini. Study in operatic composition followed, first with Richard Genée in Vienna and then with Léo Delibes in Paris.

De Koven returned to the U.S. in 1882 to live in Chicago, Illinois, and later lived in New York City. He was able to find scope for his wide musical knowledge as a critic with Chicago's Evening Post, Harper's Weekly and New York World. Many of his songs became popular, especially "Oh Promise Me", with words by Clement Scott, which was one of the biggest song successes of its time and remains a wedding standard.

Between 1887 and 1913, De Koven composed 20 light operas, in addition to hundreds of songs, orchestral works, sonatas and ballets. While Victor Herbert's operettas were heavily influenced by those of continental operetta composers, De Koven's works were patterned after Gilbert and Sullivan. His greatest success was Robin Hood, which premiered in Chicago in 1890 but was performed all across the country. It played in New York at the Knickerbocker Theatre and in London, in 1891, and at New York's Garden Theatre in 1892, and it continued to be revived for many years. His other operettas included The Fencing Master (1892, Casino Theatre, New York); Rob Roy, first produced in Detroit, Michigan, 1894; The Highwayman (1897, Herald Square Theatre, New York); The Little Duchess (1901, Casino Theatre, New York); and The Beauty Spot (1909, Herald Square Theatre).

From 1902 to 1904, De Koven conducted the Washington, D.C., symphony. His wife, Anna de Koven, was a well-known socialite, novelist and amateur historian who published her works under the name "Mrs. Reginald de Koven." The music press doubted that De Koven could compose serious operas. His opera The Canterbury Pilgrims (with a libretto by poet and dramatist Percy MacKaye) premiered at the Metropolitan Opera in 1917. He composed a second opera, Rip Van Winkle (also with a libretto by MacKaye), but died before it was performed in 1920 in Chicago.

One obituary asserted that he proved that "the American stage was not dependent upon foreign composers."

== Works ==
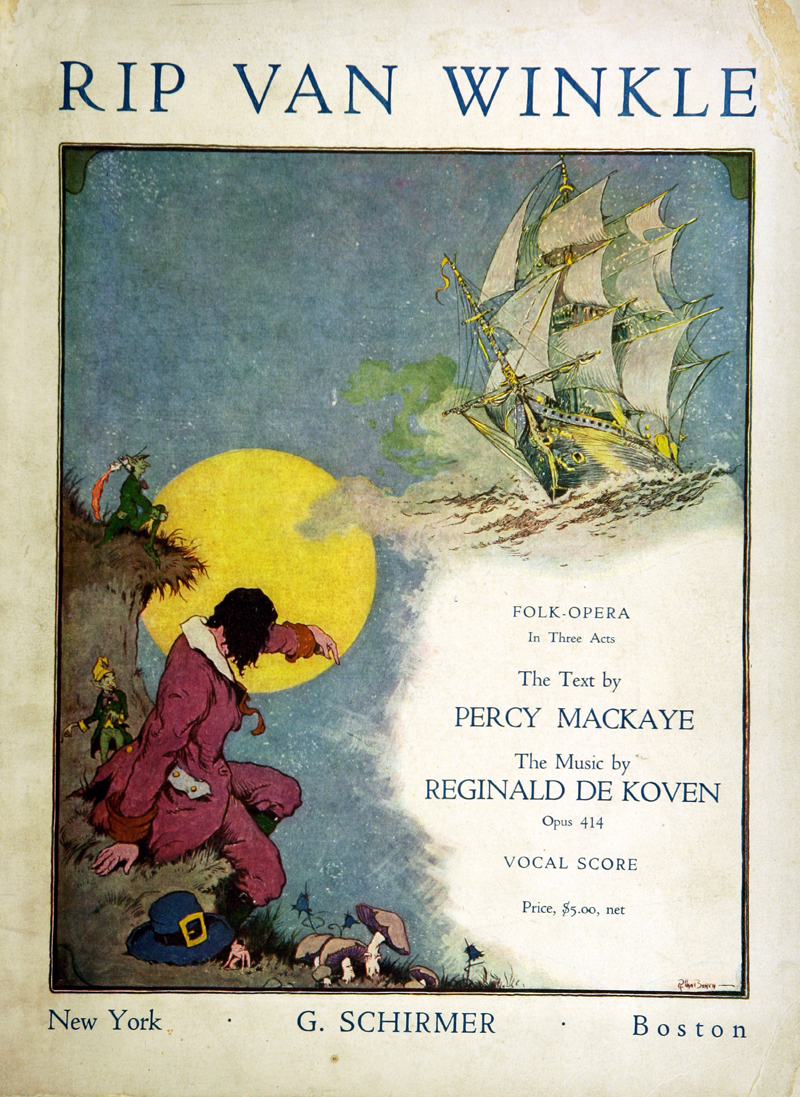
Cover of Rip Van Winkle, 1919

=== Selected stage works ===
- The Begum (1887), operetta, libretto by Harry B. Smith
- Robin Hood (1890) operetta, libretto by Harry B. Smith
- The Fencing Master (1892) operetta, libretto by Harry B. Smith
- The Algerian (1893) operetta, libretto by Glen MacDonough
- Rob Roy (1894), operetta, libretto by Harry B. Smith
- The Tzigane (1895), comic opera, libretto by Harry B. Smith
- The Mandarin (1896), operetta, libretto by Harry B. Smith
- The Highwayman (1897), operetta, libretto by Harry B. Smith
- The Three Dragoons (1899), operetta, libretto by Harry B. Smith
- The Man in the Moon (1899), musical, music by De Koven, Ludwig Englander and Gustave Kerker, book and lyrics by Louis Harrison and Stanislaus Stange
- Papa's Wife (1899), musical, lyrics by De Koven, book by Harry B. Smith, lyrics by Smith and De Koven
- Broadway to Tokio (1900), musical, book and lyrics by Louis Harrison and George V. Hobart
- Foxy Quiller (In Corsica) (1900), operetta, libretto by Harry B. Smith
- The Little Duchess (1901) musical, book and lyrics by Harry B. Smith
- Maid Marian (1902), musical, book and lyrics by Harry B. Smith
- Red Feather (1903), operetta, book by Charles Klein, lyrics by Charles Emerson Cook
- The Jersey Lily (1903), musical, book and lyrics by George V. Hobart
- Happyland; or, The King of Elysia (1905), operetta, libretto by Frederic Ranken
- The Student King (1906), operetta, libretto by Frederic Ranken and Stanislaus Stange
- The Golden Butterfly (1908), operetta, libretto by Harry B. Smith
- The Beauty Spot (1909), musical, book by Joseph W. Herbert, lyrics by Terry Sullivan
- The Wedding Trip (1911), operetta, book by Fred de Gresac, lyrics by Harry B. Smith
- The Canterbury Pilgrims (De Koven) (1916), opera, libretto by Percy MacKaye
- Rip Van Winkle (1919), opera, libretto by Percy MacKaye

=== Other compositions ===
- Prelude in G minor
- Rosalie: Chansonette (1901)
