= Gay White Way =

Gay White Way may refer to:

- Broadway (theatre), originally referred to electric illumination, later used to reference homosexuality in relation to Broadway theater
- The Gay White Way (1907), musical by Ludwig Engländer
- Gay White Way (1928), an Elmer Rice production
- "On the Gay White Way", a song from the 1942 film My Gal Sal; see Hermes Pan
- "On the Gay White Way", a song from the 1952 film With a Song in My Heart
