= Carlstedt =

Carlstedt is a surname. Notable people with the surname include:

- Birger Carlstedt (1907–1975), Finnish painter
- Claudia Carlstedt (1878–1953), American actress and singer
- Lily Carlstedt (1926–2002), Danish javelin thrower
