= Fair Waist and Dress Company =

American retailer

Fair Waist and Dress Company was an early 20th-century women's apparel establishment, founded in 1909, located at 1372 - 1378 Broadway (Manhattan). It was situated at the corner of 32nd Street.

In 1929 the business' offices were located in the Lefcourt-Malborough Building, Broadway and 36th Street (Manhattan). In 1930, the main office was at 1400 Broadway. The physical location was a thirty-five story skyscraper which occupied the site of the former Knickerbocker Theatre (Broadway). It occupied 100,000 square feet (9,300 m^{2}) and was situated at the corner of 38th Street. Branch salesrooms were in Boston, Massachusetts, Chicago, Illinois, St. Louis, Missouri, and Kansas City, Missouri.

In January 1920 the firm's proprietor was AbrahamGevirtz. Maurice L. Hano became the company's general representative in December 1923.

== Litigation ==
Fair Weather Waist and Dress Company were forced to submit to arbitration in a suit initiated against it by Susquehanna Silk Mills in April 1927. The two businesses disputed a contract which involved more than $100,000 worth of crepe' de chine. Susquehanna sold 800 pieces of silk to the Fair Waist and Dress Company in 1925, which after six pieces had been delivered, refused additional deliveries and returned the six pieces. In a judgment rendered by the New York Court of Appeals, the Fair Waist and Dress Company was forced to pay $22,468 to the silk mills.

In October 1934 the Fair Waist and Dress Company were charged with flagrant violations of the Dress Code in United States Federal Court. U.S. attorney, Martin Conboy, asked for a temporary injunction to restrain the company from additional violation of the code. The code was adopted by the clothing industry on November 13, 1933, under the National Recovery Act. According to Conboy, the company was asking its employees to work more than thirty-five hours a week, and up to forty-six hours weekly, including Saturdays, in violation of the NRA code. The employees were owed thousands of dollars in back wages. They were not being paid time and a half for their work or being paid according to the wage scale.
