= Louis Harrison =

American actor and playwright

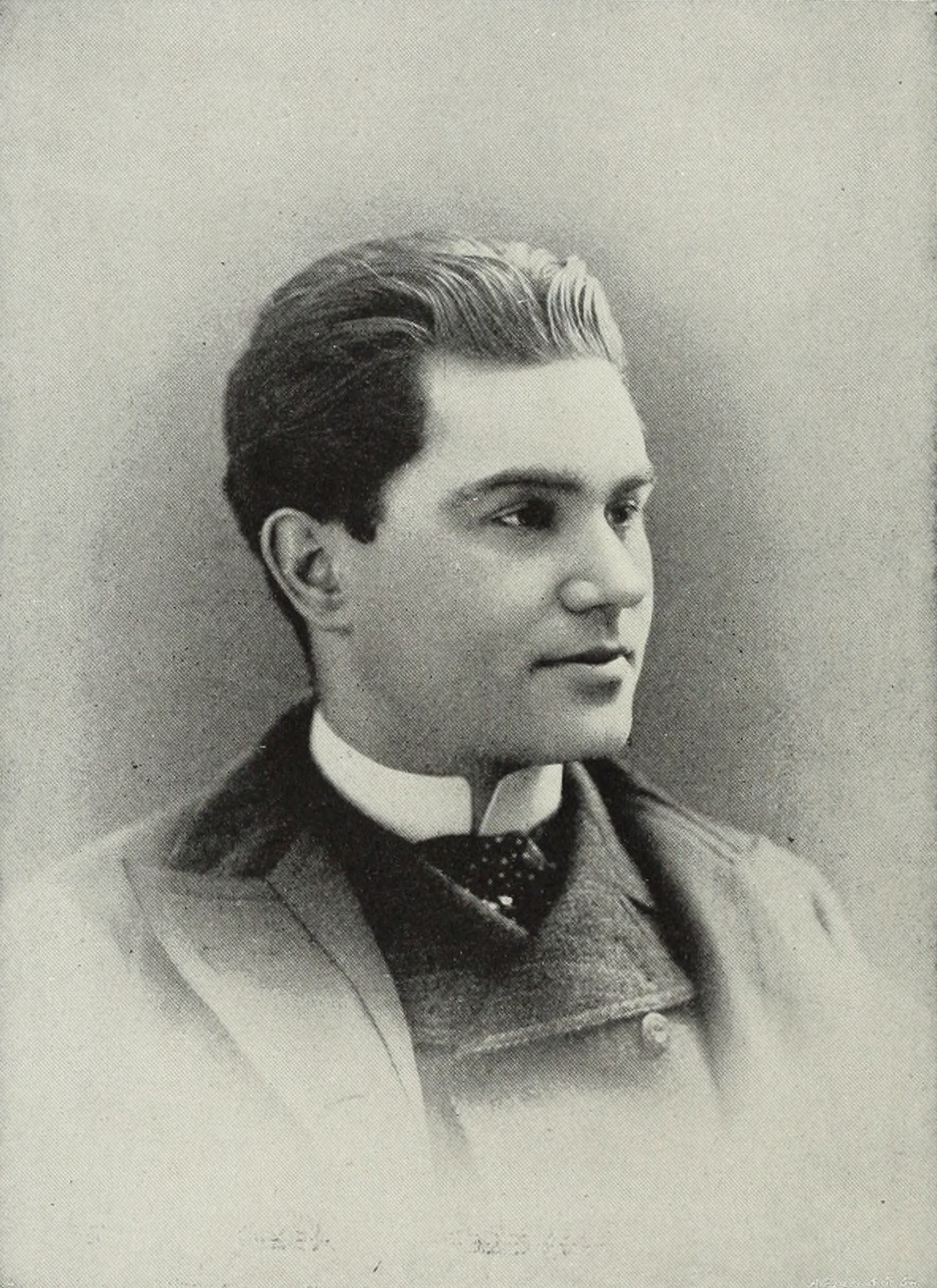
Harrison in 1894

Louis Harrison (1859, Philadelphia – October 23, 1936, New York City) was an actor, playwright, comedian, lyricist, librettist, and theatre director. As both a performer and playwright, he was mainly active within the genres of musical theatre and light opera.

== Life and career ==
Louis Harrison was born in Philadelphia, Pennsylvania in 1859; the son of immigrants from England. His family was Jewish. His brother was the theatrical manager Samuel Harrison. He attended the Northwest Grammar School in Philadelphia.

Harrison had a prolific career as a stage actor that spanned more than 40 years. He began his career as a child actor in his native city performing at the Walnut Street Theatre and Arch Street Theatre. He left school while a teenager to join a touring acting troupe led by the actress Louisa Lane Drew.

Harrison eventually co-established his own theatre troupe with the actor and dramatist John Gourlay. Together the men created and starred in the farce Skipped by the Light of the Moon with which they toured the United States successfully; including performances on Broadway at the Fifth Avenue Theatre in 1884. In 1888 he returned to Broadway in the role of Tyfoo in Edward E. Rice's staging of Gustave Kerker's comic opera The Pearl of Pekin at the Bijou Theatre with critics citing his comedic gifts as the main attraction of the show. In 1891 he portrayed Matthew in an English language production of Edmond Audran's La cigale et la fourmi at the Garden Theatre.

Harrison co-created the operetta Prince Nam; or A Trip to Venus with Charles Alfred Byrne and it premiered at the Casino Theatre on 29 January 1894. He had collaborated earlier with Byrne on writing the libretto for William Furst's opera Isle of Champagne which was staged in Buffalo, New York in 1892; a production which was reportedly enjoyed by Grover Cleveland, then mayor of Buffalo. Harrison, Furst, and Byrne collaborated again to create the operetta The Princess Nicotine (1894); a work which was staged at the Lyric Theatre and starred Lillian Russell in the title role. Harrison also co-authored the book and lyrics to the 1899 musical The Man in the Moon with playwright Stanislaus Stange; a work which used music by composers Ludwig Englander, Gustav Kerker, and Reginald De Koven.

When the operetta La Belle Hélène was revived on Broadway in 1899 at the Casino Theatre, the production used an English language translation by Harrison which also included many new original lyrics to the arias. Harrison translated another French-language work for the Broadway stage that year, the 1896 play In Paradise (French: Le Paradis), which was co-authored by Maurice Hennequin, Paul Bilhaud, and Fabrice Carre. The play was staged at the Bijou Theatre from September 1899 through November 1899.

With George V. Hobart, Harrison co-wrote both the lyrics and book to the musical Broadway to Tokio (1900, New York Theatre) in collaboration with composer Alfred Baldwin Sloane. He collaborated with Hobart and Sloane again to create the musical A Million Dollars that same year.

Harrison directed Ramsay Morris's play Madge Smith, Attorney which premiered at the Bijou Theatre on December 10, 1900; later transferring to the Grand Opera House where it closed in March 1901. The play was a starring vehicle for the actress May Irwin who portrayed the title heroine. In 1907 he was one of several lyricists for Gustav Kerker's musical Fascinating Flora; a work in which he also portrayed the role of Alphonse Allegretti. He also contributed lyrics to the Broadway musicals Jack O'Lantern (1917) and Tip Top (1920).

Harrison was a busy leading comic actor in several Broadway musicals created by other artists. These included a number of musicals created by Sydney Rosenfeld and Alfred Baldwin Sloane; including the roles of Lord Quex in The Giddy Throng (1900–1901); King Philip of Spain in The King's Carnival (1901); and both Prosper le Gai and Andrew Cairngorm in The Hall of Fame (1902). He also had leading roles in musicals created by the composer Reginald De Koven, including The Jersey Lily (1903, as Don Pedro de la Platza) and The Golden Butterfly (1908, as Baron von Affenkoff). In 1903–1904 he starred in the original Broadway production of Victor Herbert's Babette. In 1904 he portrayed Ferdinand Day in Ludwig Englander's The Two Roses, and starred in a production of Franz von Suppé's Fatinitza at the Broadway Theatre. He starred in another von Suppé operetta at the Broadway Theatre the following year, Boccaccio, opposite the actress Fritzi Scheff in the title role.

In 1905 Harrison portrayed several roles in Jean Schwartz's musical revue Lifting the Lid at the Aerial Gardens; including a celebrated parody of Oscar Hammerstein I. In 1910 he portrayed Napoleon Ravachal in Ben Jerome's He Came from Milwaukee at the Casino Theatre. In 1918 he portrayed Dr. Dippy in Ivan Caryll and Irving Berlin's The Canary. In 1925 he portrayed the First Mate in Otto Harbach, Oscar Hammerstein II, and Jerome Kern's Sunny. His final appearance on Broadway was starring in The Earl Carroll Vanities in 1930–1931.

Louis Harrison died in New York City on October 23, 1936. At the time of his death, The New York Times stated he was 70 years old. However, biographical entries on the actor have indicated he was born in 1859, making him either 76 or 77 years old at the time of his death.

== Bibliography ==
- Amy Asch, ed. (2008). The complete lyrics of Oscar Hammerstein II. Knopf Doubleday Publishing Group. ISBN 9780375413582.
- Ruth Benjamin, Arthur Rosenblatt (2006). Who Sang what on Broadway, 1866-1996: The singers (L-Z). McFarland & Company. ISBN 9780786415069.
- Thomas A. Bogar (2015). American Presidents Attend the Theatre: The Playgoing Experiences of Each Chief Executive. McFarland & Company. ISBN 9781476606804.
- Gerald Martin Bordman, Richard Norton (2010). American Musical Theatre: A Chronicle. Oxford University Press. ISBN 9780199729708.
- T. Allston Brown (1903). A history of the New York stage from the first performance in 1732 to 1901, volume 2. Dodd, Mead & Co.
- Dan Dietz (2021). The Complete Book of 1910s Broadway Musicals. Rowman & Littlefield Publishers. ISBN 9781538150283.
- David Hummel (1984). The Collector's Guide to the American Musical Theatre, Volume 1. Scarecrow Press. ISBN 9780934628020.
- Robert Ignatius Letellier (2015). Operetta: A Sourcebook, Volume II. Cambridge Scholars Publishing. ISBN 9781443885089.
- Hamilton Mason (1940). French Theatre in New York: A List of Plays, 1899-1939. Columbia University Press. ISBN 9780848250652.
- Henry Samuel Morais (1894). The Jews of Philadelphia: Their History from the Earliest Settlements to the Present Time; a Record of Events and Institutions, and of Leading Members of the Jewish Community in Every Sphere of Activity. Levytype Company.
- Laurence Senelick (2017). Jacques Offenbach and the Making of Modern Culture. Cambridge University Press. ISBN 9781108326247.
- Adolph S. Tomars (2020). The First Oscar Hammerstein and New York's Golden Age of Theater and Music. McFarland & Company. ISBN 9780786496150.
