= The Little Duchess (musical) =

1901 musical

The Little Duchess is a musical in three acts with music by Reginald De Koven and both book and lyrics by Harry B. Smith. Produced by Florenz Ziegfeld Jr., the work was an adaptation of Alfred Hennequin's 1878 play Niniche. The musical was created as a starring vehicle for Ziegfeld's longtime life partner, the actress Anna Held, who portrayed Clare de Brion, a.k.a. "The Little Duchess".

The original production of The Little Duchess was directed by George F. Marion who also starred in the production as Count Cassibianca. The cast also included Sydney Barraclough as the romantic male lead, Captain Ralph Edgerton. The musical used sets designed by Ernest Albert, and costumes designed by Caroline Seidle, Will R. Barnes and Archie Gunn. Herman Perlet served as music director. After initial tryout performances in Baltimore and Washington D.C., the work premiered on Broadway at the Casino Theatre on October 14, 1901. Midway through the production's Broadway run, the show transferred to the Grand Opera House where it closed in April 1902 after 144 performances.

== Plot ==
Setting: Ostend and Paris

The Parisian actress Clare de Brion and her uncle, Count Cassibianca, are hounded by creditors. In order to escape them, Clare assumes the false identity of "The Little Duchess" and flees Paris for the coast. At the beach she attracts many admirers as a "belle in a bathing suit", but has her heart set on English officer, Captain Ralph Edgerton. A comedy of errors involving mistaken identities and deceptions through various costume changes follows as the duchess attempts to the win the heart of Edgerton and solve her family's financial woes. All ends happily.
