= Eden Musée =

Amusement center in New York, New York, U.S. (1884-1915)

Coordinates: 40°44′33.5″N 73°59′29.4″W

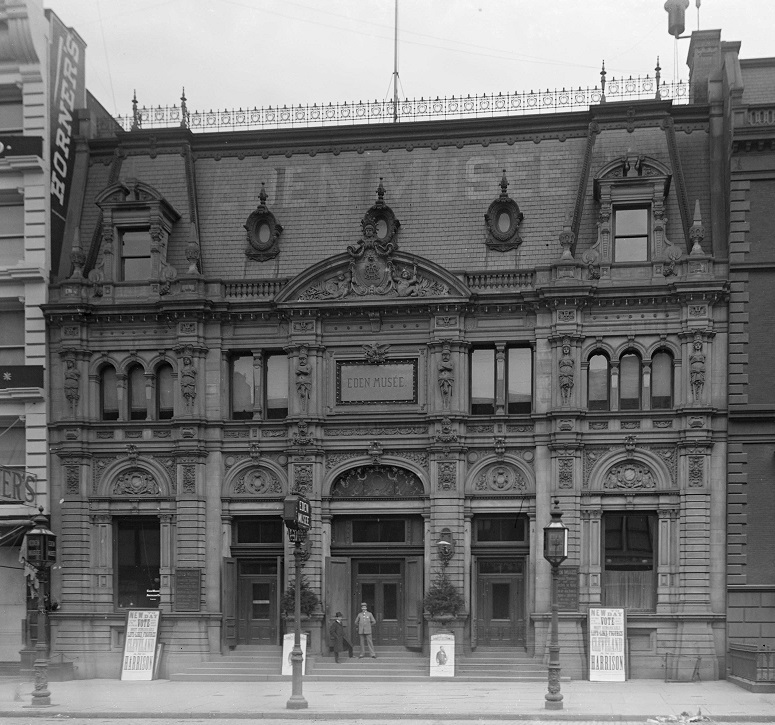
Eden Musée

The Eden Musée was an amusement center in New York City that featured a large waxworks collection, musical concerts and a changing selection of specialty entertainment, such as magic lantern shows and marionettes. It was opened on March 28, 1884. It featured a collection of paintings and became an early exhibitor of motion pictures. Located on 55 West 23rd Street in Manhattan in an imposing stone building. The building featured several halls with different themes. It was particularly known for its Chamber of Horrors, which was kept in the museum basement

== Film Exhibition ==
On December 18, 1896, the Lumiere cinematographe films were presented for two months in the Winter Garden, which had a 2000-seat capacity.

It became the first venue in the United States to make motion pictures a standard part of programming until it closed.

In the summer of 1897, film pioneer Edwin S. Porter, an electrician by training, assisted in the building of a custom film projector, to replace one destroyed by fire. In 1887 he returned with a job programming short films for exhibition, after the Eden Musee became Thomas Edison's first motion picture licensee. On February 1, 1898 the Eden Musee released its first self-produced film, The Passion Play of Oberammergau. This was billed as film actually shot in Oberammergau, Germany, when it was actually shot on the roof of the original Grand Central Palace in New York City, a fact that was quickly uncovered by the press. The presentation included 19 minutes of film interspersed with lantern slides.

After the Eden Musee went bankrupt and closed in 1915, the name and select wax figure groupings, including those from the Chamber of Horrors, were purchased at auction and exhibited in Coney Island. The Coney Island Eden Musee was destroyed by fire in 1928.

== In popular culture ==
The opening of Act 1 of the Broadway musical Broadway to Tokio (1900) is set inside the Eden Musée.
