= Claudia Carlstedt =

American actress

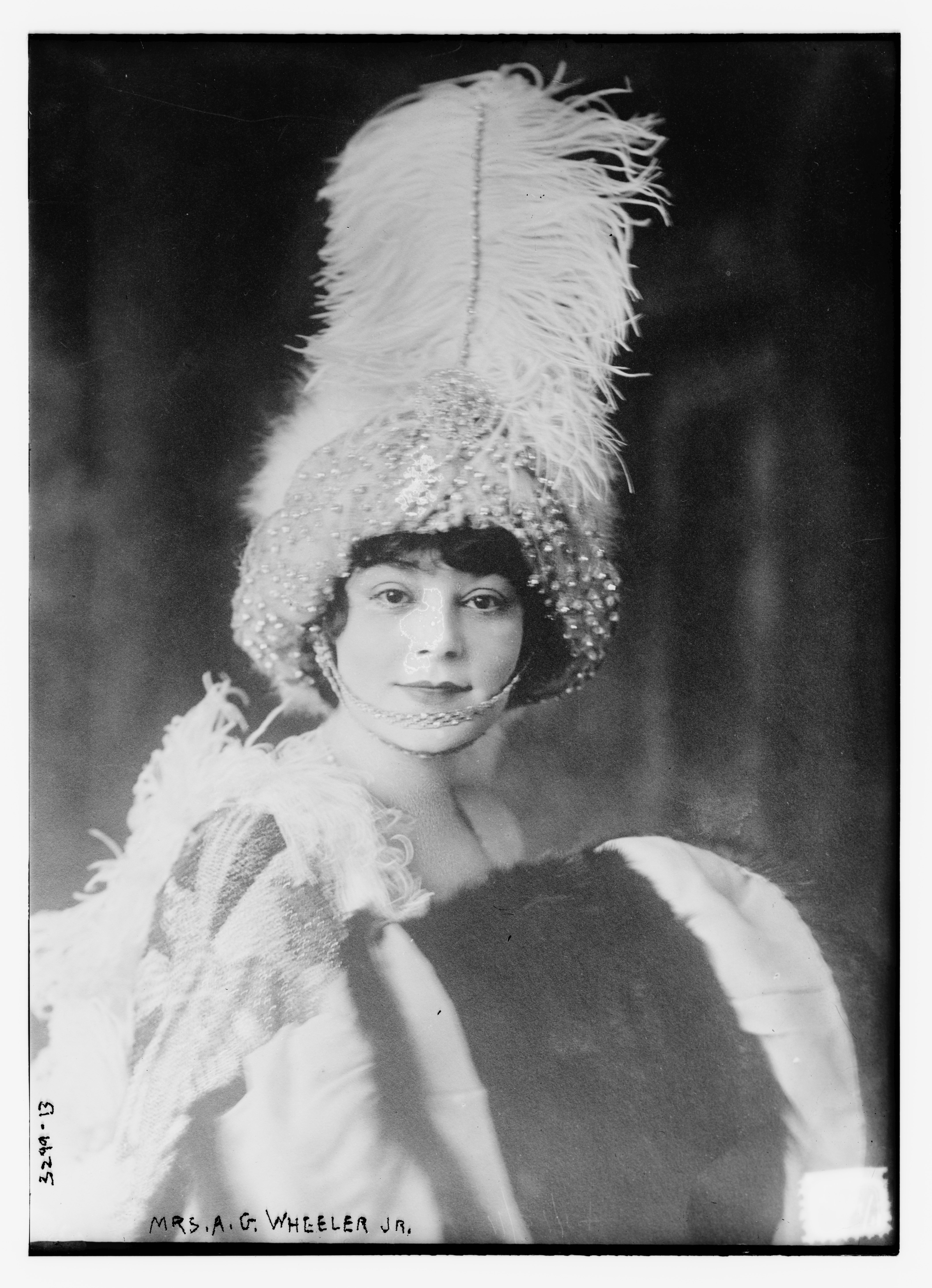
- Claudia Carlstedt Wheeler, from the Library of Congress
- Born: Claudia Therese Carlstedt; March 9, 1878; Gloucester, Massachusetts, U.S.
- Died: May 30, 1953 (aged 75); Mattituck, Long Island, New York, U.S.
- Other names: Claudia Carlstedt Wheeler, Claudia Carlstedt Kistler
- Occupation: Actress

Claudia Therese Carlstedt Wheeler Kistler (March 9, 1878 – May 30, 1953) was an American actress and singer, known as "The Girl in the Red Tights". Her tumultuous personal life was a matter of public interest through the 1910s and 1920s.

== Early life ==
Carlstedt was born in Gloucester, Massachusetts, and raised in Chicago, the daughter of Axel B. Carlstedt and Anna Bird Carlstedt. Her father was born in Sweden, and worked as a music educator; he was described in 1898 as the director of conservatories in Boston and Chicago, but this description was disputed at the time.

== Career ==
Carlstedt, a contralto, performed mainly in comic operas. Her stage credits included roles in Reginald de Koven's The Mandarin, Victor Herbert's The Wizard of the Nile (1895–1896), and The Idol's Eye (1897–1898), Come Over Here (1913, in London) Experience (1919), Max Reinhardt's The Miracle (1924), and Big Hearted Herbert (1934). She was known as "the Girl in the Red Tights" after her first big role. During World War I, she went to England and sang at events to recruit soldiers.

== Personal life ==
Carlstedt married three times. Her first marriage ended in divorce in 1898. Her second husband was wealthy businessman Albert Gallatin Wheeler Jr.; they married in 1898, and separated in 1910. Their protracted divorce in the 1910s was covered by newspapers nationwide. "Being a wife to a man like Mr. Wheeler, Jr., is like acting one of the small parts that are nothing but 'feeders' to the star," she commented in 1914. "You say stupid, meaningless lines just to enable him to make brilliant replies." She had her ex-husband arrested in 1922, when he reappeared after several years in hiding.

After the Wheelers' divorce, she was involved with an Egyptian prince, but would not convert to Islam to marry him. Her third husband was Frederick Lefevre Kistler; they married in the 1930s. She died at her home on Long Island in 1953.
