= Tommy Rot =

1902 musical by Safford Waters

Tommy Rot is a musical in two acts with both music and lyrics by Safford Waters, and a book by Rupert Hughes, Joseph W. Herbert, Paul West, and Kirke La Shelle. It premiered on Broadway at Mrs. Osborn's Playhouse on October 21, 1902. It ran for 39 performances; closing on November 22, 1902. It used sets by Joseph A. Physioc and D. Frank Dodge.

Tommy Rot used an embedded narrative device where there was a play within a play; in this case the story taking place during a production of William Shakespeare's As You Like It. It starred Blanche Ring as Innocence Demure, Grayce Scott as Phoebe Dare, Fletcher Norton as Eric Leicester, Evelyn Florence Nesbit as Miss Always There, Charles Butler as Thomas Rottingdean and Croker Sturgis, George Herbert as Marchese Reminesca and Hot Tomale Oscar, and Alfred Hickman in the roles of Hawtrey Treebohm and Lawrence Trenwithou.

The musical's most successful number was "The Belle of Avenue A" which was performed by Blanche Ring. This song was written by Waters years earlier and was published by Howley, Haviland & Dresser in 1895.
