= The Mandarin (operetta) =

The Mandarin is an operetta or comic opera in three acts with music by Reginald De Koven and a libretto by Harry B. Smith. Commissioned by Charles D. Evans and W. D. Mann, it is reminiscent in tone and style to Gilbert and Sullivan's The Mikado. It premiered at the Star Theatre in Buffalo, New York on October 12, 1896. It transferred to Broadway where it opened at the Herald Square Theatre on November 2, 1896; running there for a total of 36 performances. The cast included Henry Norman as the Emperor of China, George Honey as Mandarin of Foo-Chow, Bertha Waltzinger as Jesso, George B. Boniface Jr. as Fan-Tan, Adele Ritchie as Ting-Ling, Joseph Sheehan as Hop-Sing, Alice Barnett as Sing-Lo, Helen Redmond as Ping-Tee, Claudia Carlstedt as Kwei-Tso, Mildred Meade as Jasmine, Louise Harlowe as Lotos Lily, Florence Pemberton as Turnkey, and Samuel Marion as Wun-Wing.
