= The King's Carnival =

1901 musical burlesque by A. Baldwin Sloane and Sydney Rosenfeld

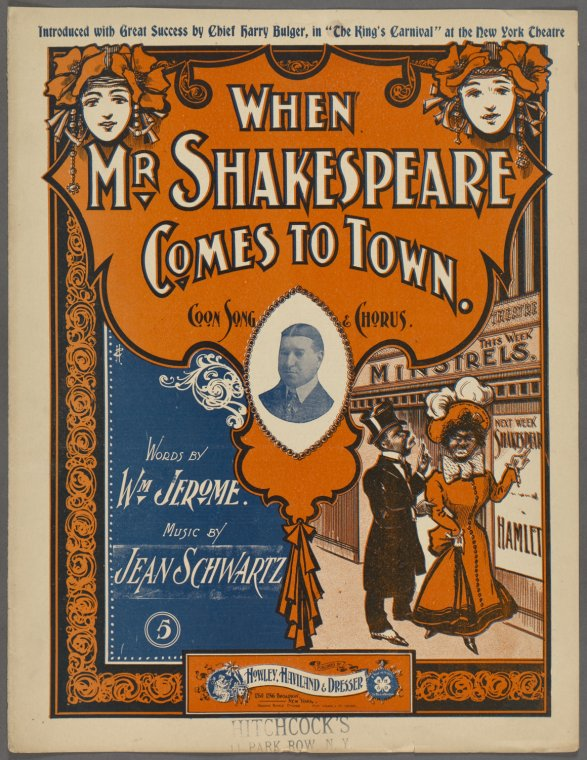
Front cover of the 1901 sheet music for Schwartz & Jerome's "When Mr. Shakespeare Comes To Town" which was introduced by Harry Bulger in The King's Carnival.

The King's Carnival is a musical burlesque in two acts with music by A. Baldwin Sloane and both book and lyrics by Sydney Rosenfeld. The musical also included one hit song by the songwriting team of Jean Schwartz and William Jerome, "When Mr. Shakespeare Comes to Town". The musical was a parody of several Broadway shows that dealt with royalty and courtly drama, including targeted spoofs of Paul Kester's When Knighthood Was in Flower, Clyde Fitch's The Climbers, Paul M. Potter's Under Two Flags, and Lorimer Stoddard's In the Palace of the King.

== Broadway production ==
Set in palaces in Spain and England, The King's Carnival starred Marie Dressler in the role of Anna of Austria, Queen of Spain, Louis Harrison as Philip II of Spain, Harry Bulger as Henry VIII, Adele Ritchie as Mary Tudor, Amelia Summerville as Inez, and Mayme Gehrue as Sidonia.

The King's Carnival was directed by Frank Smithson and produced by Rosenfeld. It used costumes by Caroline Siedle. It premiered on Broadway at the New York Theatre on May 13, 1901. It ran there for a total of 80 performances; closing in June 1901. The production then took a break before resuming performances at the same theatre in September 1901. It ultimately closed on October 12, 1901, with a total Broadway run of 102 performances.
