= Jack O'Lantern (musical) =

Musical by Ivan Caryll, Anne Caldwell and R. H. Burnside

Jack O'Lantern is a musical in two acts and 8 scenes with music by Ivan Caryll and both lyrics and book co-authored by Anne Caldwell and R. H. Burnside. The work also included some additional songs with music by Irving Berlin, Shelton Brooks and Gus King; and lyrics by Louis Harrison and Benjamin Hapgood Burt.

Jack O'Lantern was written as a starring vehicle for Fred Stone who portrayed John Obadiah Lantern, a.k.a. "Jack O'Lantern". The work premiered on Broadway at the Globe Theatre on October 16, 1917. A modest success, it ran for a total of 265 performances; closing on June 1, 1918. The work was directed by Burnside, produced by Charles Dillingham, and included sets designed by Ernest Albert, Homer Emens and Joseph Urban. Helen Dryden, Robert MacQuinn, and Gladys Monkhouse designed the costumes.

== Bibliography ==
- Bordman, Gerald Martin; Norton, Richard (2010). American Musical Theatre: A Chronicle. Oxford University Press. ISBN 9780199729708.
- Dan Dietz (2021). "Jack O'Lantern". The Complete Book of 1910s Broadway Musicals. Rowman & Littlefield Publishers. ISBN 9781538150283.
