= The New Yorkers (Engländer musical) =

- A Musical Comedy in Two Acts
- Music: Ludwig Engländer
- Lyrics: George V. Hobart
- Book: Glen MacDonough
- Productions: Broadway: Herald Square Theatre (1901)

The New Yorkers is a musical in two acts with music by Ludwig Engländer, a book by Glen MacDonough, and lyrics by George V. Hobart. The musical also contains some additional song material by composer Jackson Gouraud and lyricist George Sidney, and contained "coon songs" by Will Marion Cook and Sidney L. Perrin.

The musical premiered on Broadway at the Herald Square Theatre on October 7, 1901. It ran for a total of 64 performances; closing on November 30, 1901. The production was produced and directed by George W. Lederer and used costumes designed by Caroline Seidle. The sets were designed by D. Frank Dodge and Ernest Albert.

The original production starred Dan Daly as Upson Downes, an unemployed New Yorker trying to get by in Paris, France. Downes learns that the heiress Olive Green (portrayed by Virginia Earle) is betrothed to a baron whom her family has never met. He disguises himself and pretends to be the baron, fooling Olive and her father, De Long Green (portrayed by George A. Schiller). Eventually the real baron shows up and a comedy of errors ensues.

== Bibliography ==
- Bordman, Gerald Martin; Norton, Richard (2010). American Musical Theatre: A Chronicle. Oxford University Press. ISBN 9780199729708.
- Gänzl, Kurt (1994). The Encyclopedia of the Musical Theatre, Volume 2. Schirmer Books. ISBN 9780028714455.
- Bernard L. Peterson Jr. (1993). A Century of Musicals in Black and White: An Encyclopedia of Musical Stage Works By, About, Or Involving African Americans. Bloomsbury Academic. ISBN 9780313266577.
