= Broadway to Tokio =

1900 musical

Broadway to Tokio is a musical in three acts with music by Alfred Baldwin Sloane and lyrics and book co-authored by George V. Hobart and Louis Harrison. While the song material was composed entirely by Sloane, composer Reginald De Koven also contributed some dance music to the work. Karl Hoschna and Frank Sadler orchestrated the music. Essentially a revue, the musical incorporates elements of operetta, burlesque, ballet, and vaudeville.

== Plot ==
Broadway to Tokio has a loose plot in which a mummified Cleopatra awakes inside a New York City museum and discovers her heart is missing. She first searches New York City for her heart, and then continues her quest west; first taking a train to California and then a ship to Japan. The action of the musical takes place inside the Eden Musée in New York City; Longacre Square in Tenderloin, Manhattan; aboard a train on the inside of a Pullman car; Golden Gate, San Francisco; aboard a Pacific Mail Steamship; and in the city of Tokyo (spelled Tokio in this work).

== Performance history ==
Broadway to Tokio premiered on Broadway at the New York Theatre on January 23, 1900. It ran for a total 88 performances at that theatre; closing on April 7, 1900. The work was produced and directed by Max Freeman, choreographed by Carl Marwig, and Antonio DeNovellis served as music director. The production's costumes were designed by Caroline Siedle, and the sets were designed by Ernest Albert, D. Frank Dodge, and Henry E. Hoyt. The production also featured a highly elaborate electric light design by John Whalen which was the most ornate use of electric lights seen on Broadway at that point in history.

The actress Fay Templeton led the cast in the role of Cleopatra. Other leading performers in the production included Otis Harlan as Calcium Lightwayte, Alice Judson as Patti Cadenza, Nick Long as Count Tabledotti, Idalene Cotton as Countess Tabledotti, Ignacio Martinetti as Dynamite D'Cognac, Joseph M. Sparks as Payday Donovan, Josie Sadler as Gretchen and Mrs. Payday Donovan, Mayme Kelso as Anisette, and Charles Kirk as Lee High Hung among others. Midway through the run, the production added the magician Ching Ling Foo and incorporated his act into the show.

After the Broadway run finished, Broadway to Tokio toured. Stops included performances at the Broad Street Theatre in Philadelphia, the Tremont Theatre in Boston, the and the Amphion Theatre in Brooklyn.
