= Edward Siedle =

American technical director (1858–1925)

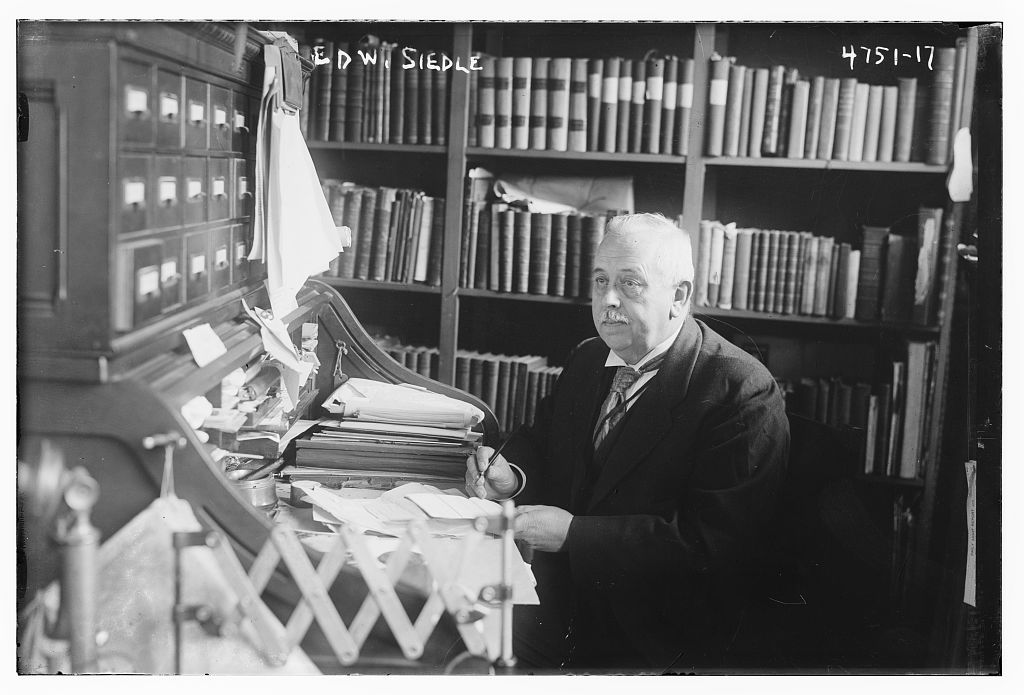
- Siedle in 1918

Technical director of the Metropolitan Opera
- In office circa 1905 – 1925

Personal details
- Born: May 30, 1858 Dulwich, England
- Died: March 30, 1925 (aged 66) Port Chester, New York

Edward Siedle (May 30, 1858 – March 30, 1925) was a British-American property master and technical director who worked mainly at the Metropolitan Opera. During his tenure at The Met, he was directly in charge of all technical elements through one of its most innovative eras.

== Biography ==
Siedle was born in Dulwich, England, on May 30, 1858. His parents were both German. He emigrated to the United States in 1878. In 1883, he married Caroline Siedle, a costume designer for theatre. They had a son named Edward Vincent Siedle who was born around 1888. The 1900 US Census lists their residence as Westchester. By 1907, they were living in Ludlow Park, Yonkers. Caroline died in 1907. Siedle remarried.

Siedle's sister, Philippine Siedle, an opera singer, was married to composer Julian Edwards. His son, Edward Vincent Siedle, served on the Mexican border in 1916 and in France as a captain in the 369th United States Infantry. He received the Croix de Guerre.

Siedle was described as "a man large in frame, stooped, with a big cigar drooping from the corner of his mouth... He looked a bit like the Winston Churchill of today." He was rarely seen without a black fedora hat and a cigar in his mouth. His office was described as "cluttered with books, papers, boxes, wigs, and full of a truly startling and heterogeneous collection of furniture, hangings, materials, and odds and ends."

Siedle was a member of St. Cecile Lodge 568, F. & A. M. He had four dogs of various breeds which he frequently brought to his office.

He died on March 30, 1925, at his home in Port Chester, New York. He had become ill, stayed home for a few weeks, and died. His funeral was held in the Grand Lodge Room of the Masonic Hall on West Twenty-third street. Most of the staff of the Metropolitan Opera attended, including Gatti-Casazza and Edward Ziegler, as well as representatives of the Theatrical Protective Union and the Theatrical Mechanics' Association. His honorary pallbearers included Jefferson de Angelis, William D. Lang, Philip Crispano, John Nash and Gustave A. Weldhaas. The Masonic Quartet sang The Long Day Closes. He was buried at Woodlawn Cemetery. Siedle was replaced by Walter Jagemann, one of his long-time assistants.

== Career ==
Siedle began his career helping out the visiting property men at a theatre in his home town of Dulwich, where he received his first permanent job as "props" at the age of 17, receiving 2 shillings a week. After one season, a visiting showman brought him to London to be a regular props man at a small theatre. He began working at Drury Lane with James Henry Mapleson. While there, one of his teachers was Bradwell (first name unknown), a famed property man and theatre mechanic.

Siedle first came to the US on one of the opera tours of Mapleson. Lester Wallack brought him to the US in the 1870s, where he remained. He toured with a company for two seasons at $7 a week. After the tour, he settled in New York City and became the technical director for the Star Theatre. He began working at the Metropolitan Opera around 1891 and became property master within the next decade.

Around 1900, he built a life-size elephant for Wang, where De Wolf Hopper sang "The Man With an Elephant on His Hands." It was such an achievement in the property business that it gained him fame and publicity. A play titled "Cupid Outwits Adam" at the Bijou Theatre in 1900 actually advertised a "mechanical effect by Edward Siedle" to help draw in audiences. A 1909 news article called Siedle "[t]he greatest master of properties in America", while a 1911 news article described him as "responsible for so many of the fine scenic effects at the opera house".

Siedle became the technical director at the Met before 1909. As technical director, Siedle was one of only two department heads (the other being Toscanini, the first conductor) to report directly to Gatti. The 1909 season had twenty new productions, including premieres or complete restagings. The scenery for the various operas was built and painted in Milan, Germany or Paris, as well as in New York by the Metropolitan's scenic artist, James Fox. In 1909, the estimated cost of the costumes and scenery for the season was over $100,000 (equivalent to $2.6 million in 2012). The cost of the scenery and properties for a single opera under Siedle's management ranged from $10,000 to $50,000.

He was credited as the technical director in the playbill for the world premiere of La fanciulla del west at the Metropolitan Opera (the first world premiere in the Met's history) on December 10, 1910. The decision to place the production of scenery, properties, costumes and effects in the hands of Edward Siedle was reached at a conference in Paris held by Gatti-Casazza, Puccini, Tito Ricordi, and his New York representative, Mr. Maxwell.

As technical director, Siedle was in charge of fifty stage carpenters, twenty property men, thirty electricians, five engineers, sixty wardrobe women. He oversaw the Met's seven storehouses (their locations included 40th St, between 7th and 8th Avenues; 41st St near 8th Avenue; 36th St near 11th Avenue; 50th Street near 11th Ave; 44th St near 11th Ave; and 41st St near 1st Ave). The storehouses of the Met held about one hundred complete productions, representing a total investment of $3,000,000 and employed an additional 12 workers.

Under Siedle's reign, the technical department at the Met built up one of the finest musical and theatrical libraries in the US at the time. Siedle had a suite of rooms on the second floor of the building for his offices. They contained books on different kinds of architecture and costumes. He also kept many of the scenic models on display, whether the opera was performed at the Met, or whether the show had never made it to the stage.

== Legacy ==
Upon his death, The New York Times wrote that Siedle was "often called 'the invisible autocrat of the opera'," in reference to how he ruled over everything on the technical side, and no opera could proceed without his permission and approval.

== Credits ==
Mechanical Effects:

- Cupid Outwits Adam – Bijou – 1900

Properties:

- Madame Sans Gene – Albaugh's Grand Opera House, Washington, DC – 1894
- The Jolly Musketeer (with costume design by his wife, Caroline) – Jefferson De Angelis Opera Company – 1898
- Wizard of Wiseland – Illinois Theatre – 1909

Properties and Effects:

- All Star Imperial Russian Ballet, Mikail Mordkin – American tour – 1911–12
- Monte Cristo – English's, Indianapolis – 1901 – (Playbill lists "Costumes, designs and effects by Edward and Caroline")

Technical Director:

- La fanciulla del west – 1910
- Natoma – Philadelphia-Chicago Grand Opera Company – 1910
- Mona – 1912
- Cyrano – 1913
- Grand Opera in Atlanta by the Metropolitan Opera Company – 1913
- Julien – 1914
- Die Walkure – Metropolitan Opera Company at City College Stadium – 1916
- Cavalleria Rusticana – Metropolitan Opera Company at City College Stadium – 1916
- Pagliacci – Metropolitan Opera Company at City College Stadium – 1916
- Brian Boru – Philadelphia, Metropolitan Opera House – 1917
- Don Carlos – 1920
- Die Tote Stadt – 1921
- Cosi Fan Tutti – 1922

Scenery Construction Supervisor

- L'oracolo – Philadelphia, Metropolitan Opera House – 1919

== Siedle Studios ==
Siedle Studios was a warehouse which Edward Siedle filled with props that he rented out, sometimes to the Met. His wife, Caroline, was a lover of auctions and antiques, and purchased many of the items for the Studios. Siedle owned the warehouse building itself until 1905, when he transferred ownership to his wife. It was located at 538 W. 29th Street in Manhattan. In 1912, the Studio employed 18 men and 2 women in the shop.

For the fiftieth anniversary celebration of the Metropolitan Museum of Art, some of the decorations in the great hall of the Fifth Avenue Entrance were provided by Siedle Studios.

== Siedle Studios Credits ==
Mechanical and artistic properties

- The Wizard Prince of Arabia – Barnum & Bailey – 1914

Properties

- Natoma – Philadelphia-Chicago Grand Opera Company – 1910
- La Fanciulla del West – Philadelphia, Metropolitan Opera House – 1911
- Natoma – Metropolitan Opera House – 1911
- L'oracolo – Philadelphia, Metropolitan Opera House – 1919
- Merchant of Venice – David Belasco – 1922
- Scandals – Apollo Theatre – 1926

Animal costumes

- Somewhere Else – Broadway Theatre – 1913

== The Gay Musician ==
In 1908, Siedle, along with Charles Campbell, wrote the book and lyrics to Julian Edward's comic opera, The Gay Musician. It had its first production in Baltimore. While successful in New York and praised for its music, the writing of Siedle and Campbell was criticized for being "slow" and "weighty". It returned to the West End Theatre in New York City at the end of 1908 after a successful tour across the US.
