= The Man in the Moon (musical) =

1899 musical

- Music: Ludwig Engländer, Gustav Kerker and Reginald De Koven
- Lyrics: Louis Harrison and Stanislaus Stange
- Book: Louis Harrison and Stanislaus Stange
- Premiere: April 24, 1899: New York Theatre, New York City
- Productions: 1899 Broadway

The Man in the Moon is a musical in three acts with music by composers Ludwig Engländer, Gustav Kerker and Reginald De Koven, and both book and lyrics by Louis Harrison and Stanislaus Stange. The work premiered on Broadway at the New York Theatre on April 24, 1899. The production closed after 192 performances on November 4, 1899. Produced and directed by George W. Lederer, the show used choreography by Carl Marwig, costumes by Caroline Siedle, and sets created by D. Frank Dodge, Henry E. Hoyt, St. John Lewis and Ernest Albert. The cast included Sam Bernard as Conan Doyle, Marie Dressler as Viola Alum, and Christie MacDonald as Diana.

University of Chicago academic Cecil Michener Smith, wrote that The Man in the Moon was "the last successful extravaganza of the 1890s", and that "the extent of popular interest in The Man in the Moon was indicated by the production of a burlesque version, The Maid in the Moon, which soon opened on the Casino Roof, and by the fact that it prompted a sequel, The Man in the Moon, Jr., for which De Koven provided the entire score."

== Bibliography ==
- John Franceschina (2018). Incidental and Dance Music in the American Theatre from 1786 to 1923, Volume 1. BearManor Media.
- Letellier, Robert Ignatius (2015). Operetta: A Sourcebook, Volume II. Cambridge Scholars Publishing. ISBN 9781443885089.
- Smith, Cecil Michener (1981). "Comic Opera: 1890s". Musical Comedy in America. Theatre Arts Books. ISBN 9780878305643.
