= Rob Roy (operetta) =

1894 operetta

Rob Roy is an operetta by composer Reginald De Koven and lyricist Harry B. Smith, frequent collaborators, loosely based upon the life of Scottish folk hero Rob Roy MacGregor, better known as Rob Roy, and Walter Scott's 1817 novel about him.

Rob Roy, designated "A Romantic-Comic Opera in 3 Acts", opens with a formal overture. The history-conflating plot covers the adventures of Rob Roy, a highland chieftain secretly married to the daughter of the mayor of Perth, and Bonnie Prince Charlie, the young pretender to the throne of Scotland, who in reality did not set foot in Scotland until 11 years after the MacGregor's death. It included several songs in imitation of Scottish folk tunes.

== Performance history ==
Rob Roy premiered in Detroit on October 1, 1894. It opened in New York on October 29, 1894, at the Herald Square Theatre and ran for 235 performances, closing on March 23, 1895. A review in The New York Times faulted it only for failing to match the high standard its creators set for themselves in their earlier Robin Hood (1890), though it identified the first act finale and Flora's song in the second act as De Koven and Smith's best work to date. It called Rob Roy "a thoroughly good operetta ... clean, frank, manly, bright, and winsome ... a right good comedy".

== Roles ==
- Rob Roy MacGregor, a Highland Chief, tenor
- Janet, daughter of the Mayor
- Prince Charles Edward Stuart, called the 'Young Pretender'
- Flora MacDonald, heiress of a Chief of the Clan MacDonald, a partisan of the Pretender
- Dugald MacWheeble, Mayor of Perth
- Lochiel, a Highlander, otherwise Donald Cameron of the Cameron Clan
- Captain Ralph Sheridan, of King George's Grenadiers
- Sandy MacSherry, town crier
- Tammas MacSorlie, the Mayor's henchman
- Lieut. Cornwallis, of King George's Grenadiers
- Lieut. Clinton
- Angus MacAllister
- Duncan Campbell
- Stuart MacPherson
- Donald MacAlpine
- Nelly, bar-maid of 'The Crown and Thistle'
- Highlanders, Lowland townsmen, Watchmen, English Grenadiers, Drummer boys etc.

== Show cocktail ==
A whisky-based Rob Roy cocktail, created on the occasion of the operetta's 1894 New York premiere by a bartender at the Waldorf-Astoria hotel, imitates the reddish colour of Rob Roy's hair.
