= Harry B. Smith =

American writer, lyricist and composer (1860–1936)

Harry Bache Smith
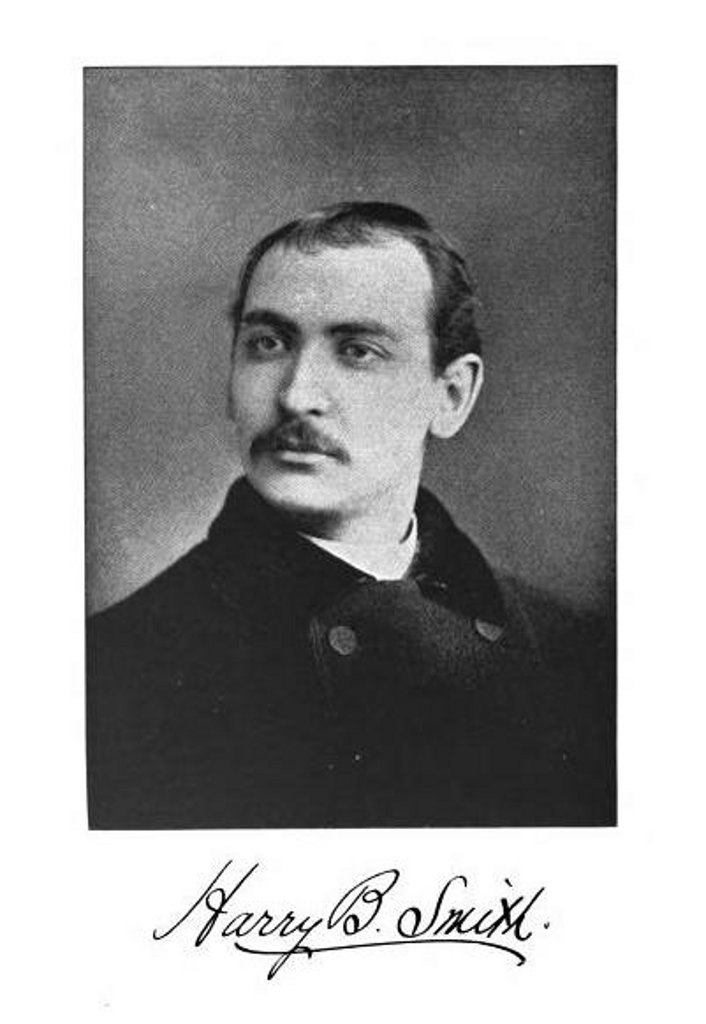
- Born: December 28, 1860; Buffalo, New York, U.S.
- Died: January 1, 1936 (aged 75); Atlantic City, New Jersey, U.S.
- Occupations: Writer, lyricist, composer
- Spouse: Irene Bentley (m. 1906)
- Writing career
- Genre: Musical theatre

Harry Bache Smith (December 28, 1860 – January 1, 1936) was a writer, lyricist and composer. The most prolific of all American stage writers, he is said to have written over 300 librettos and more than 6000 lyrics. Some of his best-known works were librettos for the composers Victor Herbert and Reginald De Koven. He also wrote the book or lyrics for several versions of the Ziegfeld Follies.

Smith was born in Buffalo, New York to Josiah Bailey Smith (born 1837) and Elizabeth Bach (born 1838). According to his autobiography First Nights and First Editions (Boston: Little, Brown, 1931), Smith's actual name at birth was Henry Bach Smith. He married twice. His first wife was Lena Reed (born August 21, 1868), whom he married on October 12, 1887 in Chicago, Illinois. They had a son named Sydney Reed Smith (born July 15, 1892). Smith's second wife was the actress Irene Bentley (c. 1870 – June 3, 1940). They married on November 23, 1906 in Boston, Massachusetts, after she had been divorced on June 12, 1906 by her first husband James Thomas Sothoron, Jr. (1867–1913). Bentley retired from the stage in 1910 and died at Allenhurst, New Jersey. She is buried in Woodlawn Cemetery in the Bronx, NY. While on a brief holiday in Atlantic City, New Jersey, on New Year's Day in 1936, Smith died of a heart attack in his room at the Marlborough-Blenheim Hotel.

Smith worked on many of the famous musical theatre productions of his time. His younger brother Robert Bache Smith (June 4, 1875 – November 6, 1951) was also a successful lyricist.

Harry Smith's archive is largely held at the Harry Ransom Center at the University of Texas at Austin.

== Selected productions ==
Unless otherwise specified below, Smith wrote the libretto (book and lyrics) for the work, and the date given is the date of the original production. In addition to the below, in 1980, some of Smith's songs were featured in the Broadway revue Tintypes.

- Fatinitza – operetta 1879
- The Begum – operetta 1887
- Robin Hood – operetta 1890
- The Fencing Master – operetta 1892
- Rob Roy – opera 1894
- The Wizard of the Nile – operetta 1895
- The Tzigane – comic opera 1895
- The Mandarin – operetta 1896
- The Highwayman – operetta 1897
- The Serenade – operetta, book 1897
- The Fortune Teller – operetta 1898
- Whirl-i-gig – musical, lyrics 1899
- The Casino Girl – musical, book 1900
- The Belle of Bohemia – operetta 1900
- The Strollers – musical, book and lyrics 1901
- The Little Duchess – musical 1901
- The Liberty Belles – musical 1901
- The Wild Rose – operetta 1902
- The Billionaire – musical 1902
- Miss Dolly Dollars – musical 1905
- A Parisian Model – musical 1906
- The Silver Star – musical 1909
- Ziegfeld Follies – revues: 1907, 1908, 1909, 1910
- The Girl in the Train – musical, English libretto 1910
- The Spring Maid – musical 1910
- The Enchantress – operetta 1911
- Ziegfeld Follies – revue, lyrics 1912
- The Girl from Montmartre – musical, 1913
- Sweethearts – operetta, book 1913
- The Lilac Domino – operetta, English adaptation 1914
- Watch Your Step – musical, 1914 (Irving Berlin's first musical)
- The Girl from Utah – musical, additional lyrics 1915
- Very Good Eddie – musical, additional lyrics 1915
- The Century Girl – musical, additional lyrics 1916
- Love O' Mike – musical, lyrics 1917
- Miss 1917 – revue, additional lyrics1912
- Ladies First – musical 1918
- The Canary – musical, book 1918
- The Miracle Man – musical, book 1919
- Florodora – 1920 revival (revised book)
- Caroline – operetta, lyrics 1923
- The Love Song – operetta, English lyrics 1925
- Princess Flavia – operetta, English adaptation 1925
- Natja – operetta, 1925
- Countess Maritza – operetta, English lyrics 1926
- The Circus Princess – musical, lyrics 1927
- Three Little Girls – musical, lyrics 1930
