= Homer Emens =

American scenic designer

Homer Farnham Emens (May 9, 1862 – September 15, 1930) was an American scenic designer who specialized in creating outdoor scenes.

== Life and career ==
Born on May 9, 1862 in Volney, New York, Homer Emens was the son of Peter Walter Emens and Elizabeth Emens (née Scott). He was educated by the Syracuse City School District in Syracuse, New York. He trained as a scenic designer by Phil Goatcher while apprenticing under him at the Madison Square Theatre in the mid 1880s. After this, he took a position as a resident set designer at the Chestnut Street Theatre in Philadelphia; a post he held from 1889-1893.

In 1893 Emens returned to New York City and opened his own paint studio. He commenced a 25 year-long career as a Broadway set designer. He also was an active member of the Society of American Artists. A specialist in outdoor scenes, he often was brought in by producers to design only the outdoor sets for works with other designers creating the sets for interior scenes. For act four of Gismonda (1894) he designed a starlit landscape which was lauded by critics, with one stating “probably the most beautiful ever put on stage” for its “simplicity, grandeur, hint of splendid architecture, [and] poetic reflection.”

In 1920 Emens left New York City for Carmel, California where he quickly became a leading member of the artist community. He worked as a scenic designer for the Forest Theater and the Theatre of the Golden Bough throughout the 1920s. In 1927 he was a founding member of the Carmel Art Association, and served as that organization's first secretary.

Homer Emens died in Carmel at the age of 68 on September 15, 1930.

== Partial list of Broadway credits ==
- Gismonda (1894)
- Babes in Toyland (1903)
- Miss Dolly Dollars (1905)
- The Prima Donna (1908)
- Lonesome Town (1908)
- Stop! Look! Listen! (1915)
- Jack O'Lantern (1917)
