= Marie George =

American actress

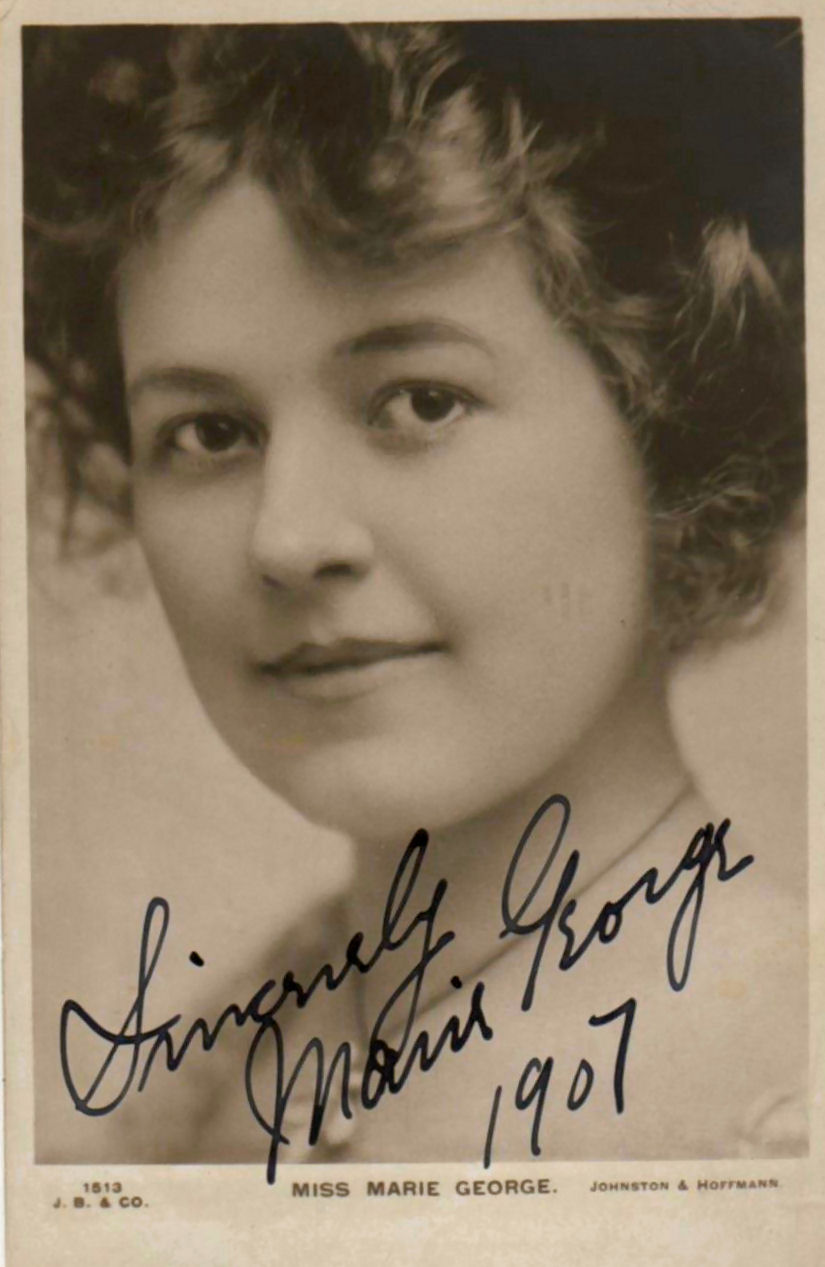
- George in 1907
- Born: Clara Marie Georg; June 25, 1876; New York City, U.S.
- Died: July 15, 1955 (aged 79); London, U.K.
- Occupation: Actress
- Years active: 1900–1911
- Spouse: Norman J. Norman

Marie George (born Clara Marie Georg; 25 June 1876 – 15 July 1955) was an American actress, singer and stage beauty who had a successful career first in New York City and later in London, England during the Edwardian era.

== Early life ==
Marie George was born in New York on 25 June 1876 as Clara Marie Georg to German-American parents. On going on the stage she adopted the anglicized version of her surname.

== Stage career ==
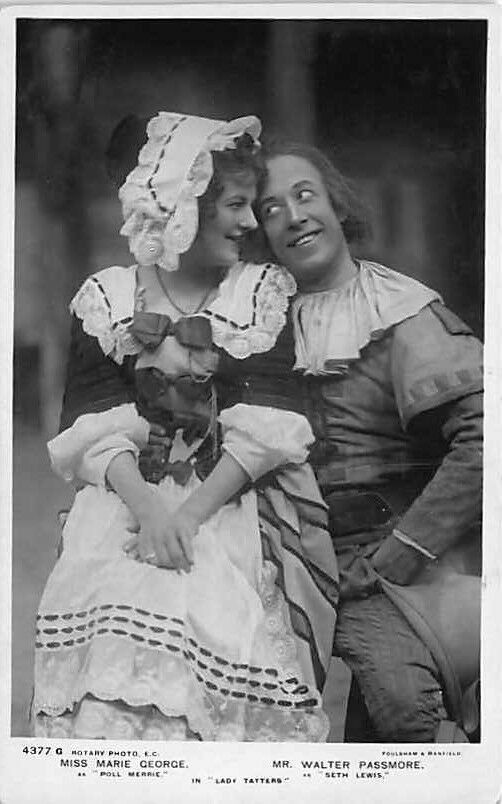
With Walter Passmore in Lady Tatters (1907)

On moving with her husband to London she played Dolly Twinkle in The Casino Girl at the Shaftesbury Theatre (1900), was in the American musical comedy The Belle of Bohemia at the Apollo Theatre (1901) and played Cornelia in The White Chrysanthemum at the Criterion Theatre (1905). For a number of years she was a regular in the annual pantomime at the Theatre Royal, Drury Lane including: Gretchen in Mother Goose (1902) opposite Dan Leno; Principal Girl in Humpty Dumpty (1903) during which she was taken ill and was replaced by Mabel Love; Cupid in The White Cat (1904)); Ruby in Sinbad (1906); Cissie in Babes in the Wood (1907); and Katrina in Dick Whittington (1908); and the title role in Aladdin (1909).

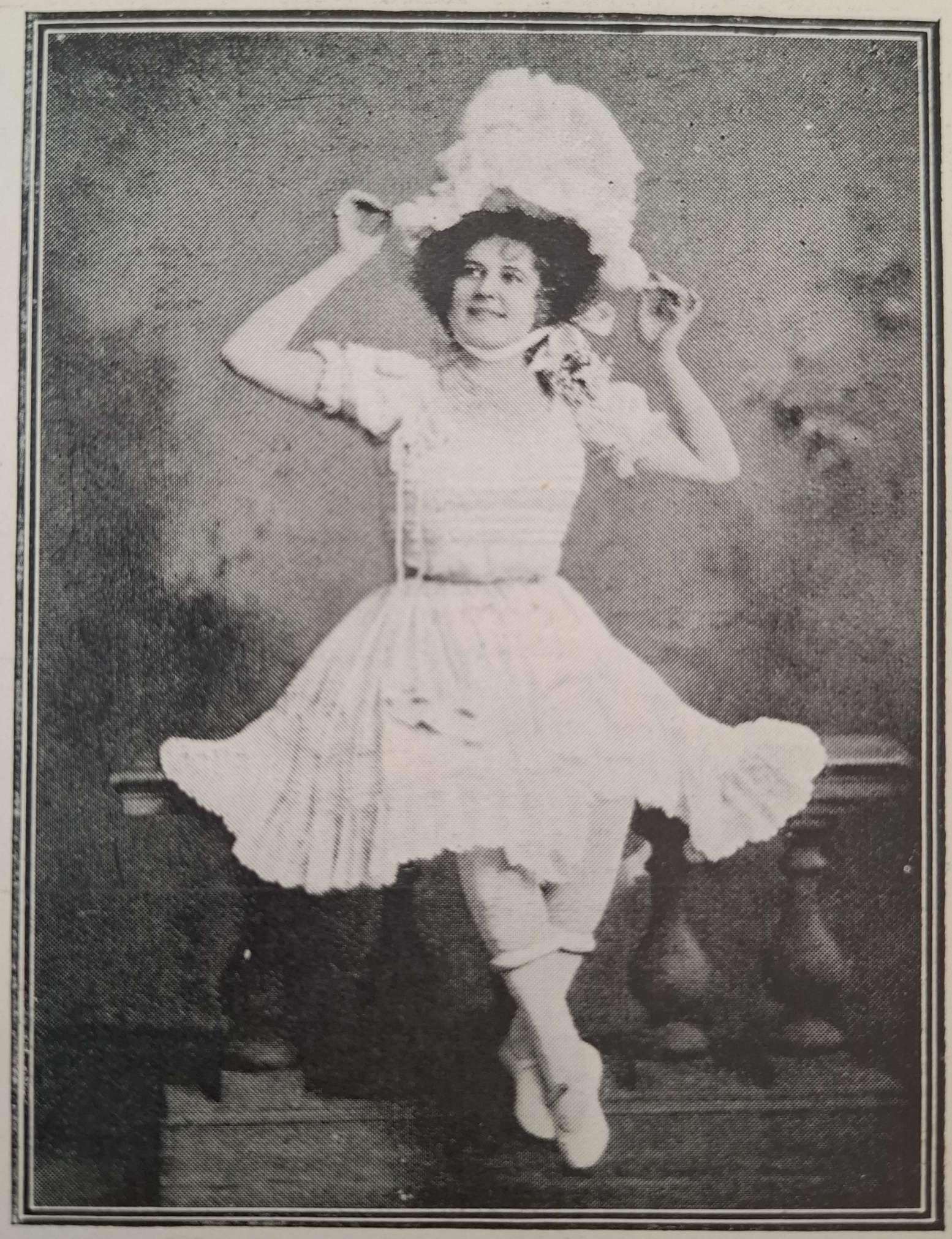
Photo of Marie George in "The Casino Girl", published in the Black and White Budget, 20 October 1900.

George appeared as Poll Merrie in Lady Tatters opposite Courtice Pounds and Walter Passmore at the Shaftesbury Theatre (1907) and played Mariza opposite Passmore in Baron Trenck at the Strand Theatre (1911). In 1912 she played the title role in a British tour of the musical comedy The Boy Scout with C. Hayden Coffin and in 1915 was Mrs. Pineapple in the first revival of A Chinese Honeymoon at the Prince of Wales Theatre.

In July 1911 Marie George was accompanied by Herbert Sparling in a performance at Brighton Palace Pier, where:

‘Marie George gives the audience twenty minutes of sparkling fun, and makes them regret very much the powers that be which prevent her continuing her part for double that period. She is delightful in her songs, “That’s a Cinch,” and “Over again.” She is most ably assisted by Mr. Herbert Sparling, whose make-up as a pianoforte turner and acting throughout is wonderfully clever.’

== Personal life ==
Marie was married to the American theatrical manager Norman J. Norman. She died in London on 15 July 1955, aged 79.
