= Ludwig Engländer =

American composer

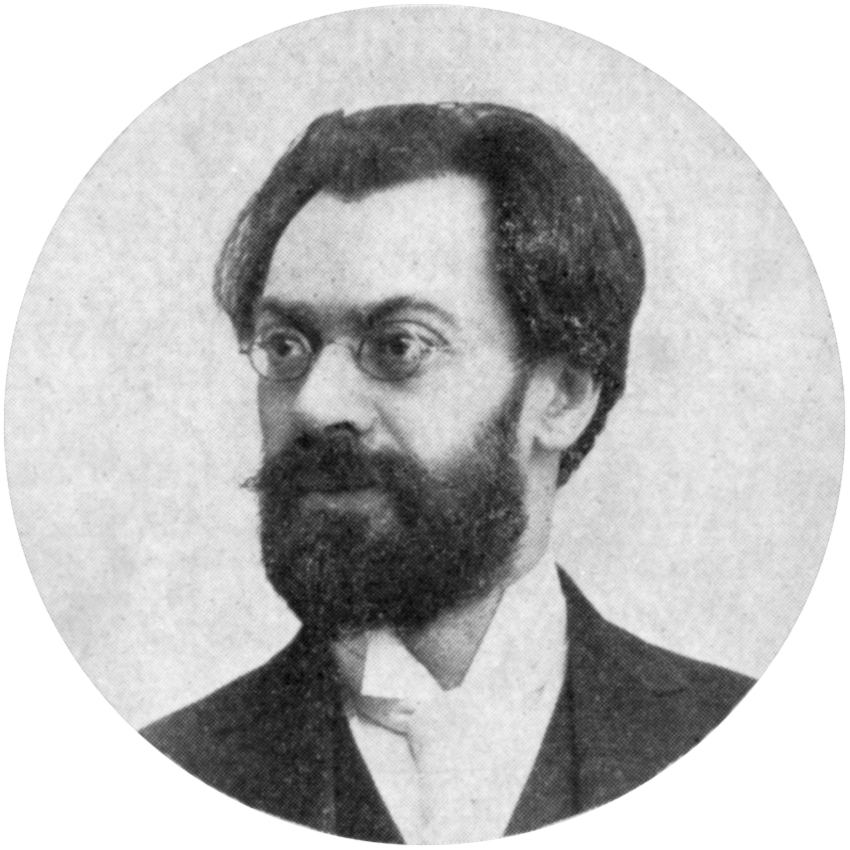
Ludwig Engländer in 1900

Ludwig Engländer (October 20, 1853 Vienna, Austrian Empire – September 13, 1914) was an Austrian Empire-born American composer of more than 30 musicals.

He was born in Vienna, Austrian Empire. According to his obituary in The New York Times, he had studied with Jacques Offenbach. He immigrated to New York City on October 13, 1882, and became a naturalized American citizen on February 13, 1891.

By the 1890s Engländer was composing prolifically, either for the New York stage, or popular songs (many of which were interpolated into various other productions including A Trip to Chinatown. Already by 1903 he had come in for criticism of his Teutonic sound. Perhaps for that reason he occasionally returned to Vienna near the end of his life to write musicals for that audience. The year before he died he is listed as having residence in Vienna.

At the time of his death he was living in Far Rockaway, Queens, with his sister.

== Works ==
- Der Prinzgemahl (1883); revised and translated into English as The Prince Consort (1883)
- The Seven Ravens (1884)
- 1776 (1884)
- Madelaine, oder Die Rose der Champagne (1888)
- The Passing Show (1894)
- A Daughter of the Revolution
- The Twentieth Century Girl (1895)
- The Caliph (1896)
- Half a King (1896)
- In Gayest Manhattan, or Around New York in Ninety Minutes (1897)
- A Round of Pleasure (1897)
- The Little Corporal (1898)
- In Gay Paree (1899)
- The Man in the Moon (1899)
- The Rounders (1899)
- The Cadet Girl (1900)
- The Casino Girl (1900)
- The Monks of Malabar (1900)
- The Belle of Bohemia (1900)
- The New Yorkers (1901)
- The Strollers (1901)
- Sally in our Alley (1902)
- The Wild Rose (1902)
- The Girl from Dixie (1903)
- The Jewel of Asia (1903)
- The Office Boy (1903)
- A Madcap Princess (1904)
- The Two Roses (1904); written for Fritzi Scheff
- The White Cat (1905)
- Rich Mr. Hoggenheimer (1906)
- The Gay White Way (1907)
- Miss Innocence (1908)
- Vielliebchen (1911)
- Kittys Ehemänner (1912)
- Madam Moselle (1914)

Additionally he wrote many popular songs written with lyricists such as Sydney Rosenfeld, J. Cheever Goodwin, Harry B. Smith, and others.
