= The Casino Girl =

Musical with a book by Harry B. Smith and Arthur Nevin, composed by Ludwig Engländer

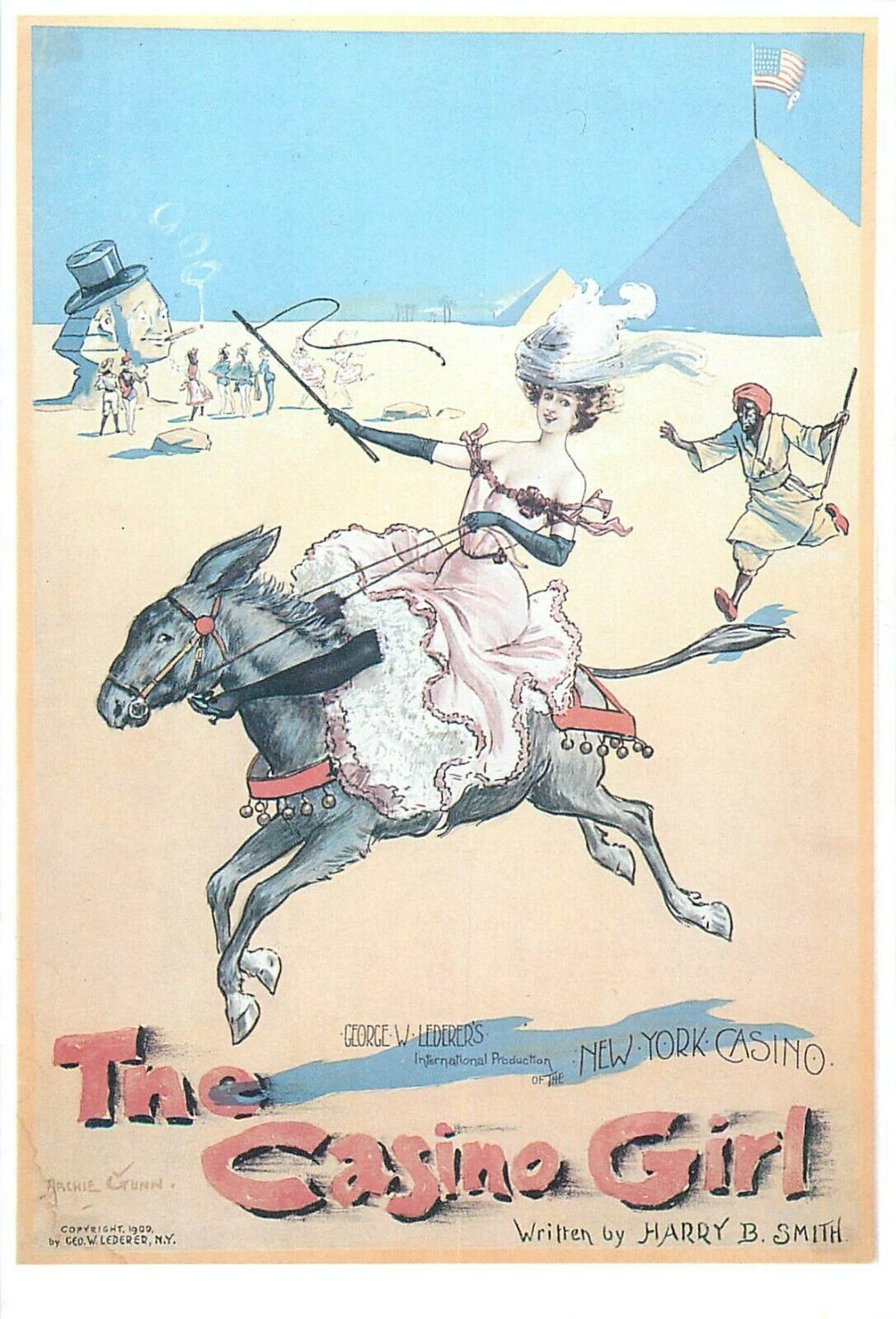
Poster for The Casino Girl

The Casino Girl is an Edwardian musical comedy in two acts with music by Ludwig Engländer, Will Marion Cook, Will Accooe, Harry Truman MacConnell and Arthur Nevin, lyrics by Engländer, Cook and MacConnell, and a book by Harry B. Smith and Arthur Nevin. The story concerns a former chorus girl at the Casino Theatre in New York, who flees to Cairo under an assumed name to escape amorous advances of an admirer.

It opened at the Casino Theatre in New York City in 1900 and had a run in the same year at the Shaftesbury Theatre in London's West End before having a Broadway revival in 1901.

== Productions ==
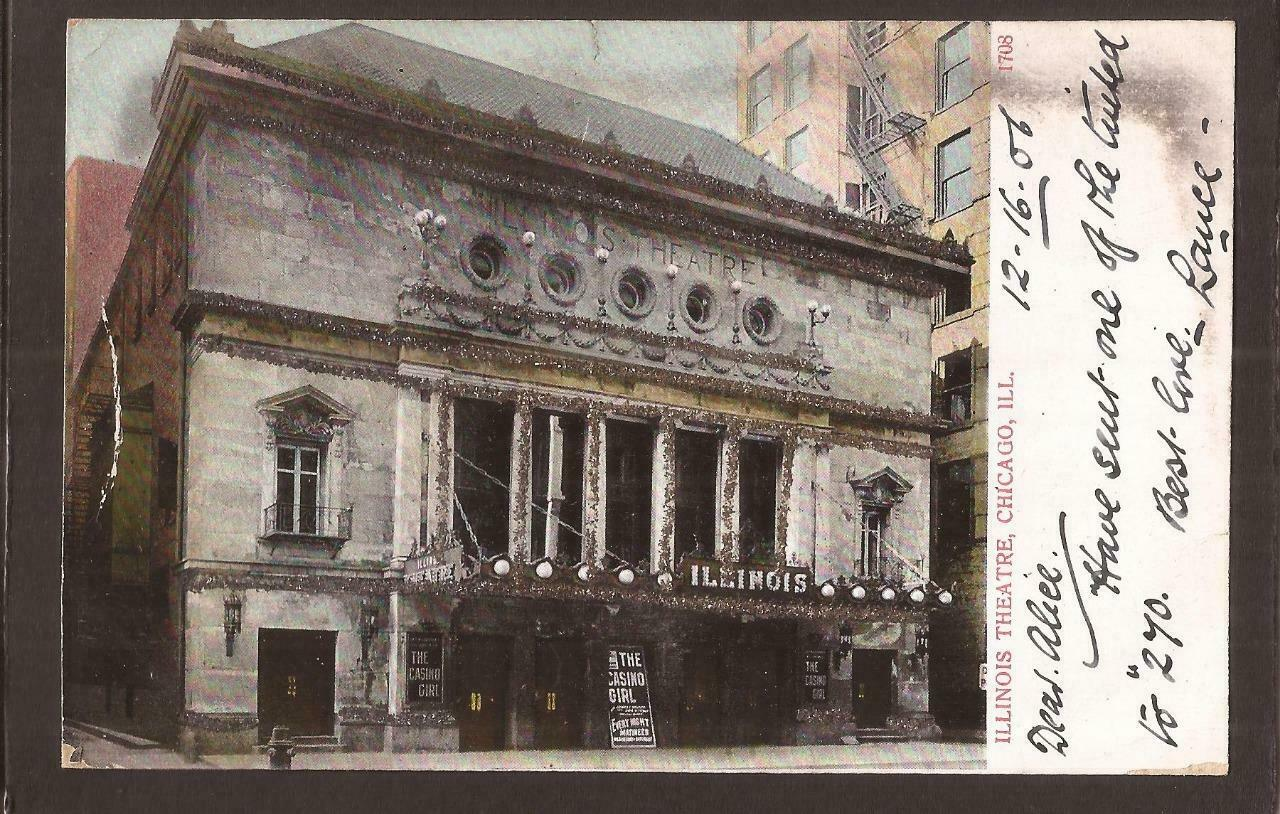
The Casino Girl at the Illinois Theatre in Chicago (1906)

The Casino Girl was billed as the twin sister of The Belle of New York and was commissioned for the Casino Theatre in New York as a vehicle for Mabelle Gilman with a cast that included Virginia Earle in a breeches role as Percy, Adele Ritchie, Lotta Faust and Sam Bernard as Pilsener. It ran at the Casino from 19 March 1900 to 9 June 1900 for a run of 51 performances and was revived at the same theatre on 6 August 1900 for 40 performances before going on a tour of the United States. It was produced by George Lederer, with music by Ludwig Engländer, Will Marion Cook, Will Accooe, Harry Truman MacConnell and Arthur Nevin, lyrics by Engländer, Cook and MacConnell, and a book by Harry B. Smith and Arthur Nevin. The show had a revival at the Knickerbocker Theatre in New York from 8 April 1901 starring Katie Seymour and James E. Sullivan.

The show was mounted at the Shaftesbury Theatre in London from 11 July 1900 to 22 January 1901 for a run of 193 performances, again with Gilman in the title role. The production immediately ran into problems as Henry Lowenfield, the theatre's manager, assumed he had the right to rewrite the show and rename the characters, which brought him into conflict with Smith, the show's book writer. The two struck a deal, and Lowenfield purchased the rights to the show for £1,000. The London production then undertook a tour of the British provinces in 1901–1902, produced by Ben Greet, with a cast led by Isa Bowman as Laura Lee and Gabrielle Ray as Dolly Twinkle.

In 1902 the musical had a production at the Theatre Royal in Bolton, Greater Manchester, England. There was a revival at the Illinois Theatre in Chicago, Illinois, in 1906.

== Synopsis ==
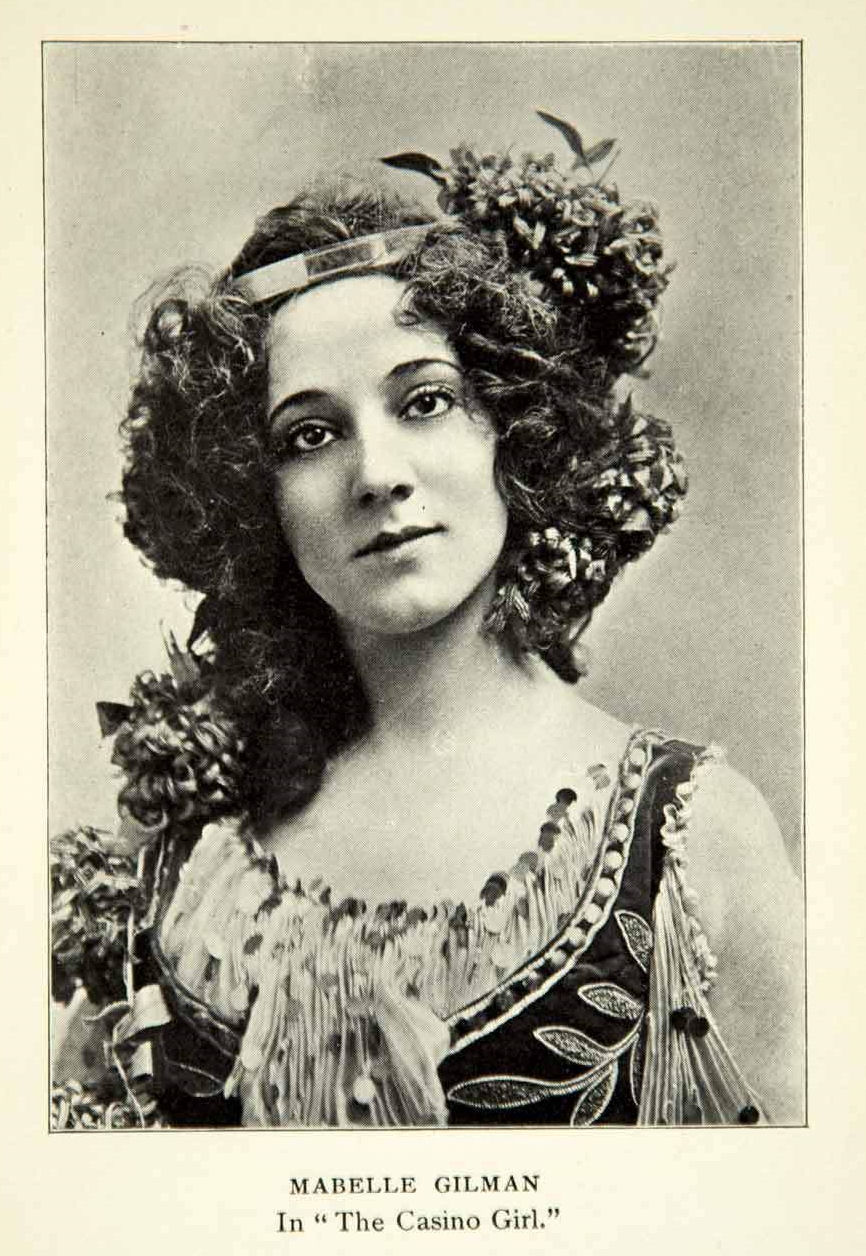
Mabelle Gilman as Laura Lee

- Act I – A Street in Cairo
- Act II – The Pasha's Palace

Laura Lee, a former chorus girl from the Casino Theatre in New York, attempts to escape the amorous advances of Percy, an English earl, by going to Cairo in Egypt where she sets herself up as Mdlle. Estelle, a French milliner. Percy arrives in Egypt in pursuit of her. Laura Lee endures complications involving a comic Pasha and some clownish thieves before she realises that she loves Percy in return, and the two are united.

After a rewrite for the London production, the Khedive became the Pasha, and Percy became a New York doctor.

== Roles and original cast ==
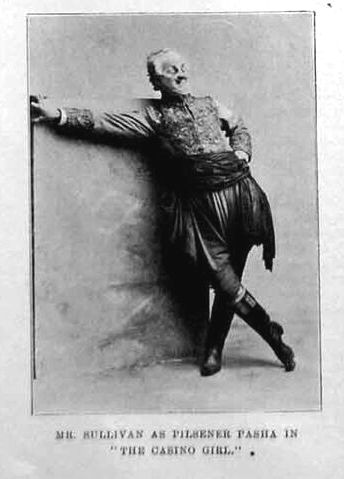
James E. Sullivan as Pilsener

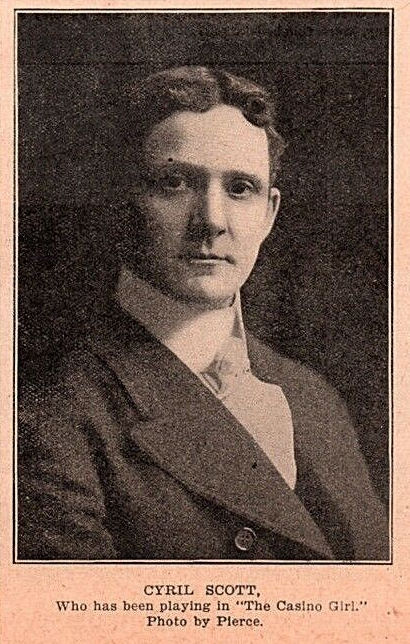
Cyril Scott as Percy

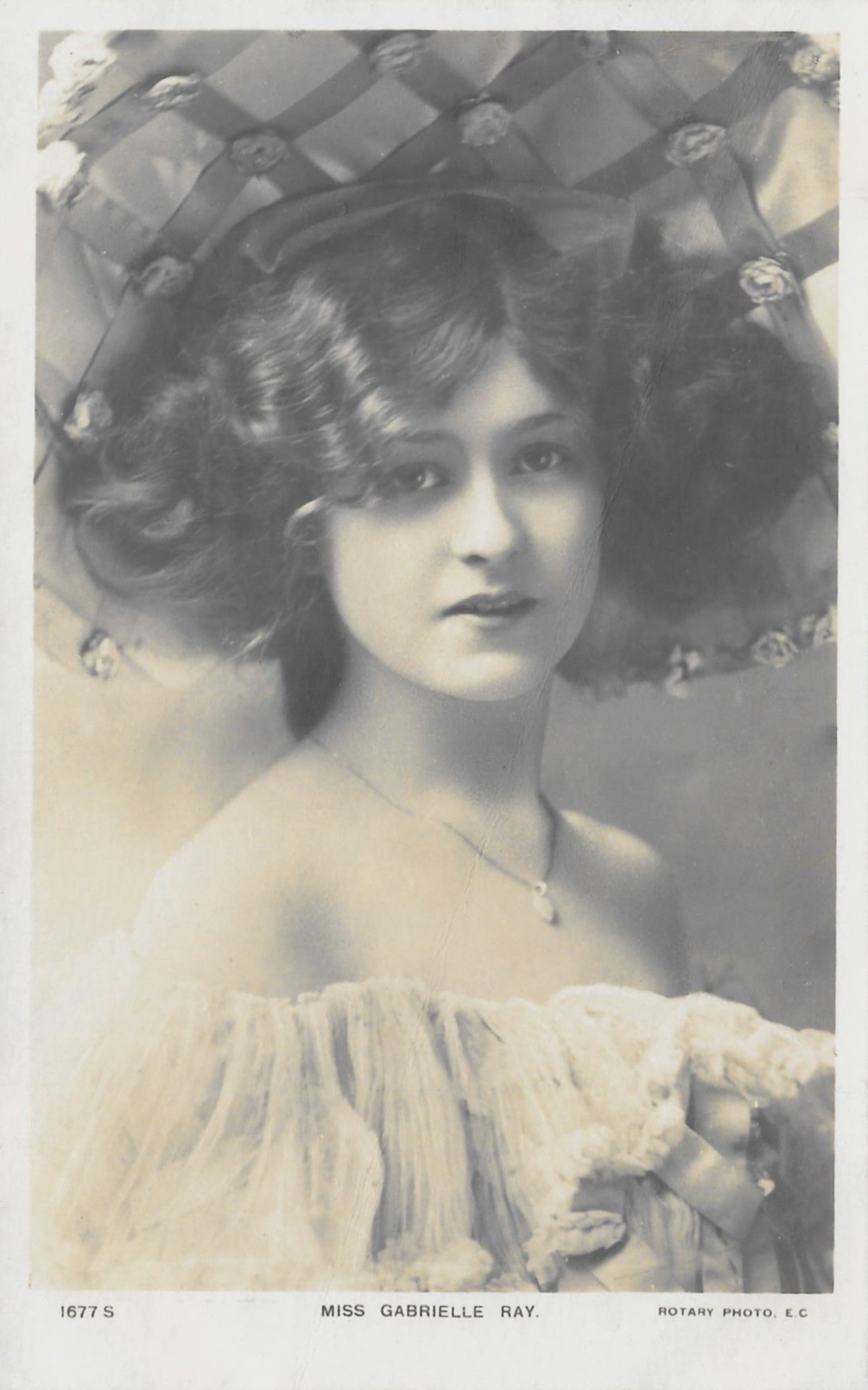
Gabrielle Ray as Dolly Twinkle in the UK tour (1900)

- Pilsener Pasha (a Brewer, whose introduction of beer into Egypt won him his title) – James E. Sullivan / Frank Bernard
- J. Offenbach Gaggs (known as Signor Hasheemi, a grand opera tenor, who takes a company to Cairo) – Richard Carle / Eric Thorne
- Percy Harold Ethelbert Van Stuyvesant (an Earl) – Cyril Scott / Thomas Whiffen / Andrew Higginson
- Ben Muley (Chief of a gang of thieves, a deserter from the French Army) – Albert Hart
- Potage (his Lieutenant) – Samuel Collins
- 1st Officer – William Black
- 2nd Officer – Joseph Sullivan
- Laura Lee (formerly of the New York Casino Company, known in Cairo as Mdlle. Estelle, a French Milliner) – Mabelle Gilman / Marie George
- Dolly Twinkle (leading dancer of the Comic Opera Company, managed by J. Offenbach Gaggs) – Marie George / Eva M. Kelly
- Miss Roxana Rocks (an heiress from Chicago) – Ella Snyder
- Lotta Rocks (her Sister) – Eve M. Kelly
- Carrie Rocks – Dolly Wiggans / Nelly McNaughton / Ethel Norcross / Grace Milburn
- Mrs. H. Malaprop Rocks (a leader of Chicago society, better half of Rocks & Co., Pork Packers of the Western Metropolis – Carrie Perkins
- Selim (a Page) – Rose Krohe
- Fatima – Minnie Cline
- Odaliaka (the Pasha's Favourite) – Caecelia Rhoda
- Errand Boy – "Rastus"
- Wives, Slaves, etc

== Musical numbers ==
Act 1

- Slave Dealer's Song – Reuben Bey
- Song of the Drum Major – Roxy Rocks
- My New York (music by Ludwig Englander) – Laura Lee
- I'll Put a Tax – The Khedive of Egypt
- How Actresses Are Made – Frederick Cholmondeley and Laura Lee

Act 2

- Mam'selle (music by Arthur Nevin) – Laura Lee
- (Down de) Lovers' Lane (music by Will Marion Cook; lyrics by Paul Laurence Dunbar) – Frederick Cholmondeley
- From Africa – Chorus
- Chink! Chink! – Fromage
- Variety – Fromage, Potage, Mrs. H. Malaprop Rocks and Roxy Rocks
- The Casino Girl – Lotta Rocks
- Society (music by William J. Accooe; lyrics by William J. Accooe) – Mrs. H. Malaprop Rocks
- A Lesson in Acting
- Money
- In Disguise (music by Arthur Weld) – Dolly Twinkle
- Annie More
- Bygone Days Are Best (music by Will Marion Cook; lyrics by L. Lamprey
- Whatever the Hue of Your Eyes (music by Will Marion Cook)
- Romance (music by Will Marion Cook)
- Love Has Claimed Its Own (music by William J. Accooe; lyrics by Stephen B. Cassin) – Percy Harold Ethelbert

Additional song:

- Ma Blushin' Rosie – Laura Lee (London production)

== Reception ==
The review in The New York Times noted the show's length: "When at 11:30 Virginia Earle said to Sam Bernard, 'Look here, old man, I'm tired of all this nonsense', a large part of the great audience that packed the theatre quietly sent up an echoing sentiment." It mentioned that the show had no plot, but that audiences don't attend the Casino for plot, rather "for pretty and shapely girls". Virginia Earle came in for the most praise although Mabelle Gilman was also given compliments. The unnamed reviewer complimented both of them in the duet "How Actresses Are Made". In addition to praising the other leads, the reviewer said that composers Cook and McConnell had written good songs that will "improve upon acquaintance." The unnamed critic of The Stage in London called the New York production a "distinct success," despite not ending until 12:30 am. The critic thought the book "most efficient" and in a "clever and satirical vein" though not up to the standard set by W. S. Gilbert due to its "heavy hand." The same critic found the music "on the whole, tuneful, though not quite up to the standard of excellence which one looks for at the Casino."

Some London critics liked the libretto, which they found full of "pleasant jokes and business" and called the lyrics "for the most part really humorous in idea and execution". The critic of The Times was less enthusiastic, commenting on, "its threadbare music, its partially intelligible dialogue, [and] the ineptitude of the way in which most of the female parts were played", while the critic for The Stage this time stated that it would have been "difficult to find a musical farce with a weaker or sillier plot".
