= Knickerbocker Theatre (Broadway) =

Former theatre in Manhattan, New York

Coordinates: 40°45′9.5″N 73°59′13.5″W

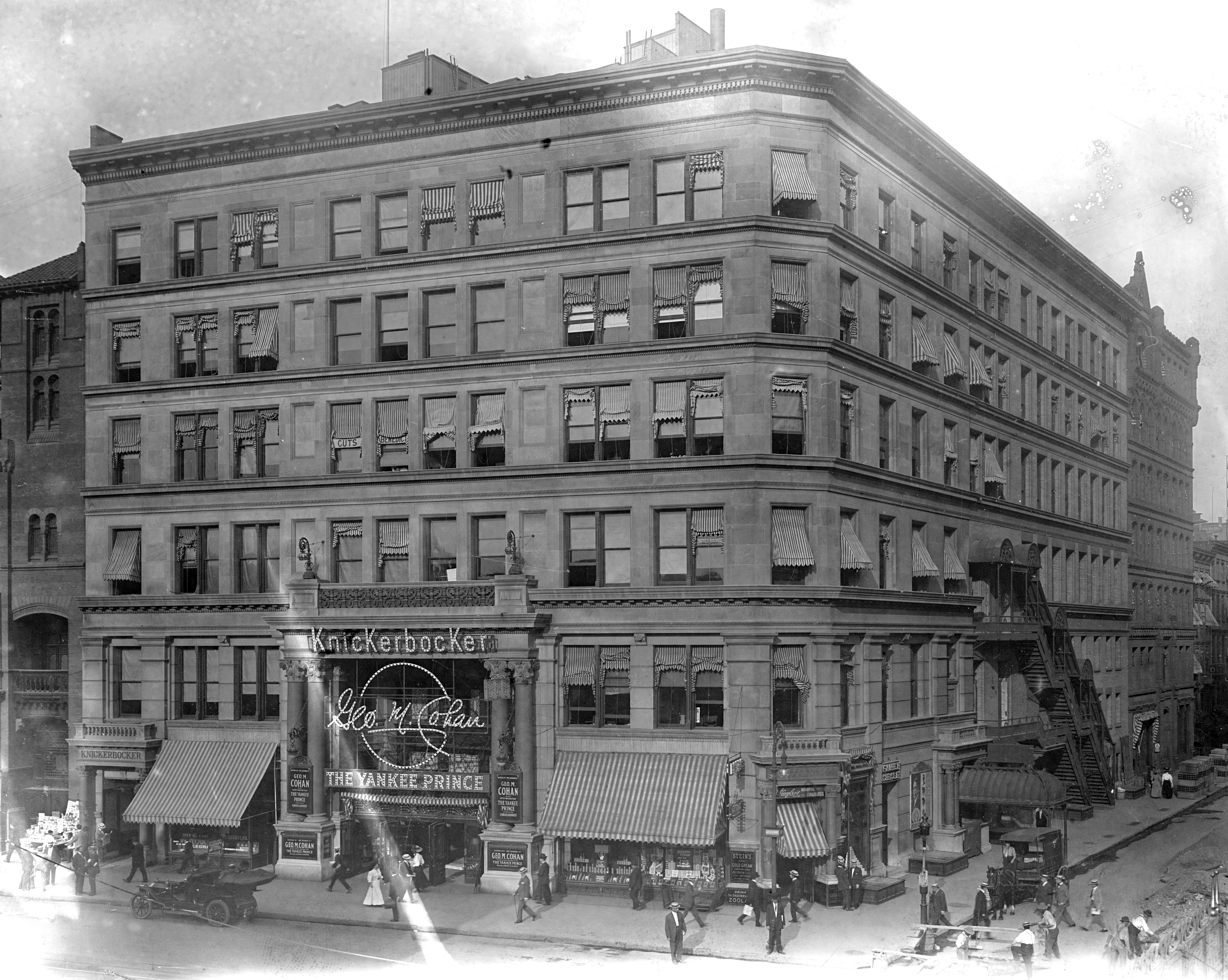
- The Knickerbocker Theatre in 1908, during the run of George M. Cohan's The Yankee Prince

General information
- Location: Manhattan, New York City
- Opened: 1893
- Closed: 1929
- Demolished: 1930

The Knickerbocker Theatre, previously known as Abbey's Theatre and Henry Abbey's Theatre, was a Broadway theatre located at 1396 Broadway (West 38th Street) in New York City. It operated from 1893 to 1930. In 1906, the theatre introduced the first moving electrical sign on Broadway to advertise its productions.

== History ==
The theatre was located inside a six story structure that also included offices for other businesses. The 1500-seat theatre was designed by the architectural firm of J. B. McElfatrick & Co. It opened as Abbey's Theatre, named after Broadway theatre manager and producer Henry Eugene Abbey, on November 8, 1893, with a production of the melodrama The Countess Valeska. In the mid-1890s, Lillian Russell starred at the theatre, including in The Queen of Brilliants, a flop.

Following Abbey's death in 1896, Al Hayman and the Theatrical Syndicate group took control of the theatre and rechristened it the Knickerbocker. In its early years, the theatre hosted productions of Shakespeare's plays and Edwardian musical comedy. Several of Victor Herbert's operettas premièred there. In 1906, the theatre introduced the first moving electrical sign on Broadway with an advertisement for its production of Herbert's The Red Mill. Operettas by European composers, such as The Dollar Princess and The Merry Widow also played there.

In 1905, Variety opened its first office at the theatre.

After World War I, the theatre continued to present a mixture of musicals, new plays and classics. Following the Wall Street crash of 1929, the theatre closed. It was demolished in 1930, along with the nearby Casino Theatre, to make way for the expanding Garment District.

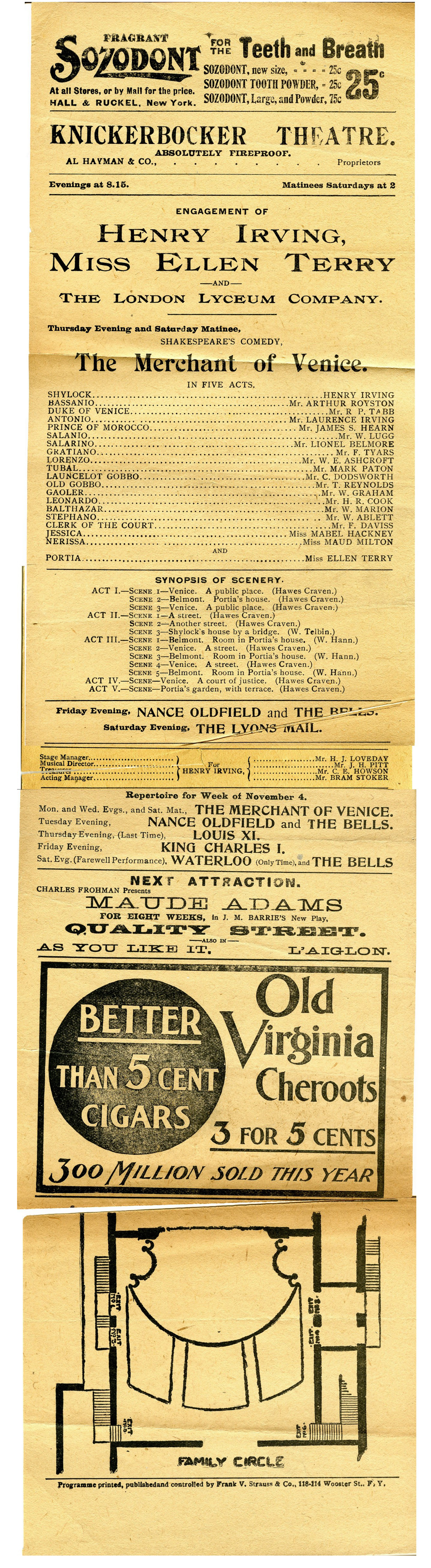
Program for The Merchant of Venice with Henry Irving and Ellen Terry, 1901

== Notable productions ==
- 1895: An Enemy of the People
- 1896: The Sign of the Cross (play by Wilson Barrett) (November)
- 1897: The Serenade
- 1898: The Christian
- 1901: Quality Street
- 1901: The Strollers (70 perf.)
- 1901 The Casino Girl (40 perf.)
- 1902: The Toreador (121 perf.)
- 1902: The Wild Rose (136 perf.)
- 1903: Mr. Bluebeard (135 perf.)
- 1905: Mlle. Modiste (202 perf.)
- 1906: The Red Mill (274 perf.)
- 1907: The Talk of New York (173 perf.)
- 1908: The Girls of Gottenberg (103 perf.)
- 1909: The Fair Co-ed (136 perf.)
- 1909: The Dollar Princess (250 perf.)
- 1910: The Arcadians (201 perf. across multiple theatres)
- 1910: The Scarlet Pimpernel
- 1911: The Siren (116 perf.)
- 1911: Kismet (the play by Edward Knoblauch) (184 perf.)
- 1912: Oh! Oh! Delphine (258 perf.)
- 1913: The Sunshine Girl
- 1913: The Marriage Market
- 1914: The Girl from Utah (120 perf.)
- 1916: The Music Master (159 perf., revival)
- 1917: Hamilton
- 1918: Listen Lester (272 perf.)
- 1920: Mary (220 perf.)
- 1922: The Clinging Vine (188 perf.)
- 1924: Peter Pan (96 perf., revival)
- 1925: Dearest Enemy (286 perf.)
- 1926: Honeymoon Lane (353 perf.)
- 1927: Sidewalks of New York (112 perf.)
