= Winfield Blake =

American actor

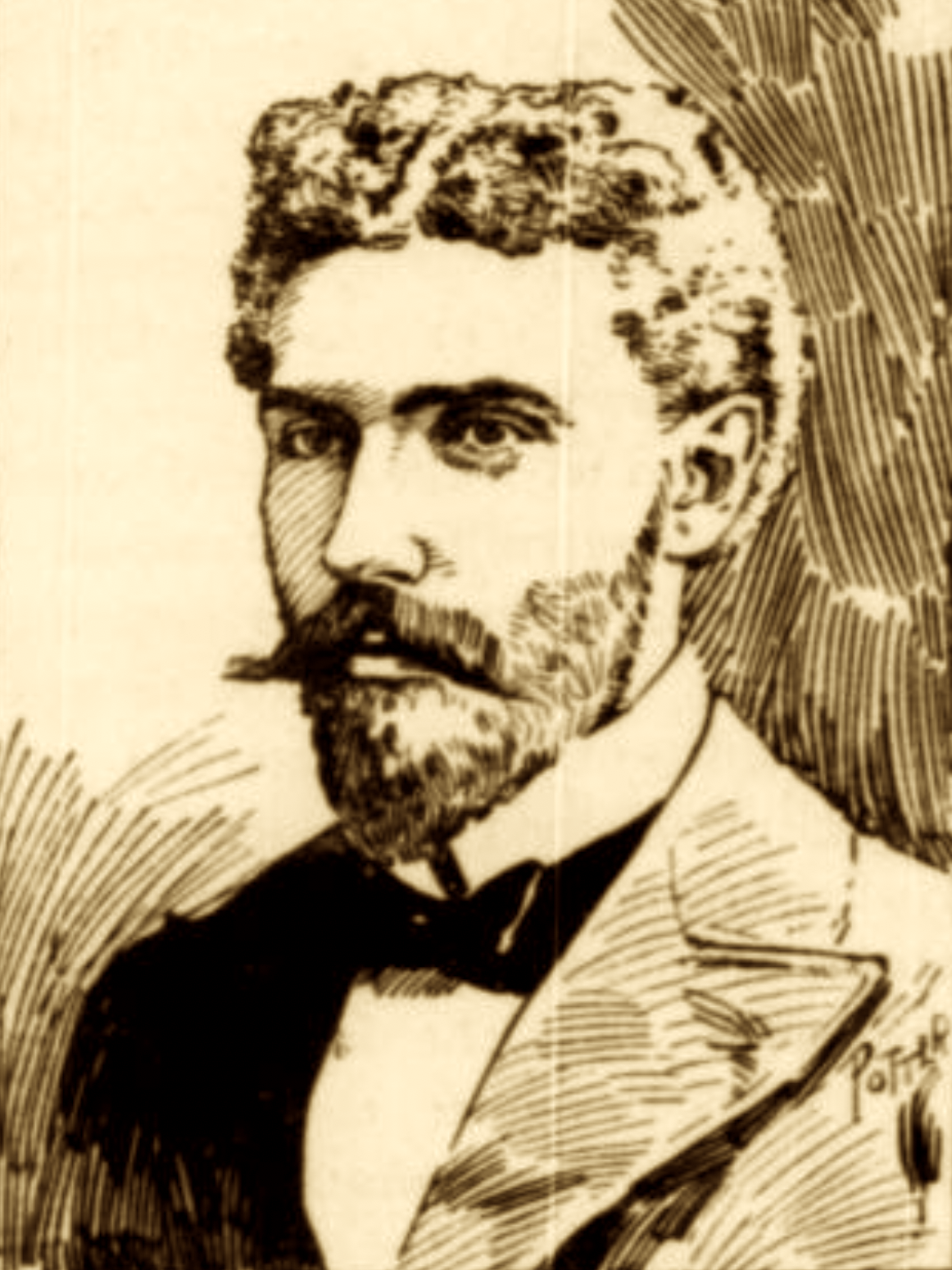
Winfield Blake as depicted in the Los Angeles Times in 1897

Winfield S. Blake (July 4, 1868 – April 12, 1932) was an American actor, comedian, bass, lyricist, playwright, theatre director and producer, talent manager, and costume designer. He was the son of oil business magnate Isaac E. Blake, who founded the Continental Oil Company (later re-named Conoco and now part of ConocoPhillips) in 1875.

Winfield Blake had an active performance career from 1889 into the early 1920s. In his early career he worked as a concert and opera singer in California from 1889 through early 1895. He spent the remainder of 1895 touring the United States and to Canada as a leading member of the Pyke Opera Company. His work then branched out into burlesque and musical theatre performances in Chicago, Washington D.C., and St. Louis before joining the comic opera troupe of Jefferson De Angelis. With that company he created leading roles in three original light operas by composer Julian Edwards: The Wedding Day, The Jolly Musketeer, and The Princess Chic. He performed these works in runs on Broadway as well as in national tours in the years 1896 through 1901. During this period he simultaneously became a prominent national advocate for the creation of American music conservatories, opera companies, and orchestras at a time when these kinds of institutions were rare in the United States. He played an instrumental role in the founding of The American Patriotic Music League in 1897, and worked as that organization's secretary in its offices at Carnegie Hall when not touring.

In 1902 Blake married the actress Maude Amber. Together they formed the comedy duo Blake and Amber. The couple performed in musical comedies and burlesques together, and also wrote their own original comedic sketches and musical entertainments in addition to performing material written by others. They were active in vaudeville at Fischer's Theatre in San Francisco from 1902 to 1904 where they performed frequently with Kolb and Dill and Barney Bernard. Together, Blake, Amber, Kolb, Dill, and Bernard toured to Hawaii, South Africa, and Australia in 1904. Blake and Amber remained in Australia as members of John F. Sheridan's theatre troupe in 1905. The couple then toured Asia in 1906 with the magician Howard Thurston before spending five years working in British music halls. They gave an international tour in 1910–1911 before returning to England where they gave their final performances in that country at the London Hippodrome in October 1911.

Blake and Amber returned to the United States in December 1911 and resumed performing in vaudeville in America. After 1914 their appearances on the stage diminished as they devoted their time to running a theatrical booking agency. Blake also worked as a theatrical director and producer and costume designer in San Francisco, and was a performing member of the Bohemian Club. He and his wife also co-authored musical theatre works staged in San Francisco by the San Francisco Press Club. By 1924 they were no longer performing and were operating a costume company in San Francisco in addition to their talent management business. Blake died in San Francisco in 1932 at the age of 63.

== Early life and career in California ==
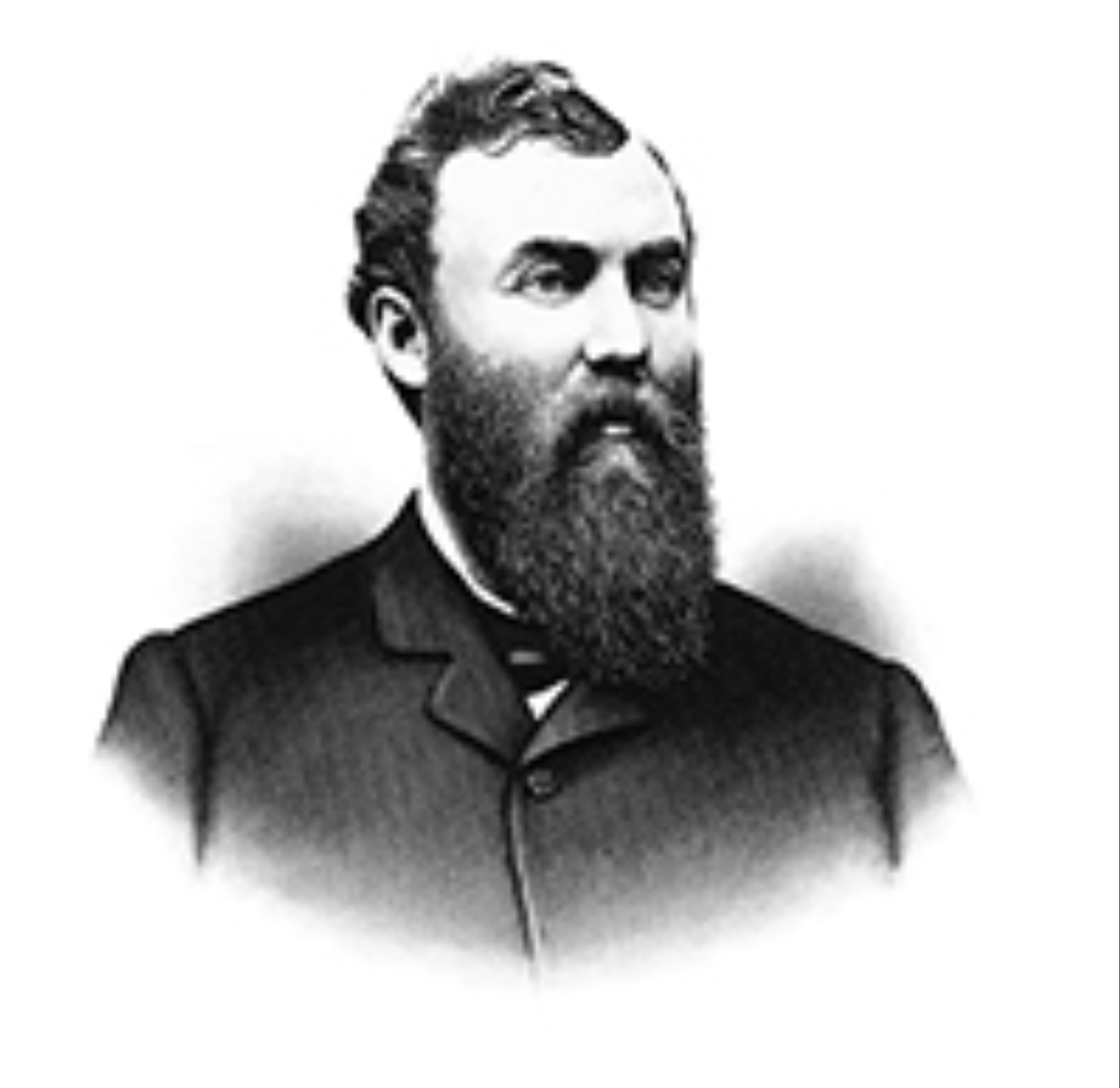
Isaac Blake, Winfield Blake's father and the founder of the Continental Oil Company (now ConocoPhillips)

The son of Isaac and Agnes Blake, Winfield S. Blake was born on July 4, 1868, in Pennsylvania. At the time of the 1880 United States census Blake was living with his parents and his younger sister and brother in San Francisco, California. The family had previously lived in Denver, Colorado, where Isaac E. Blake was the president of the Continental Oil Company (COC). Business interests for the COC in California brought the family to San Francisco, with Winfield's father investing millions of dollars in mining interests in The Needles region of the state. Isaac Blake founded the COC (later re-named Conoco and now a part of ConocoPhillips) in 1875. Isaac Blake was also founder and president of the Nevada Southern Railway, and had petroleum extraction, railway, and mining projects in various parts of California in addition to similar projects in Colorado and Nevada.

Blake made his concert debut in November 1889 at the Tivoli Opera House in San Francisco during a concert featuring the music of Giuseppe Verdi. He was a featured soloist in the trio "Te sol, te sol quest'anima" from Verdi's Attila alongside soprano Belle Thorne and tenor Edgar Temple. He performed in a concert at San Francisco's Irving Hall in January 1890, singing Cassius Clement Stearns's The Parish Sexton and Gustav Graben-Hoffmann's duet "I Feel Thy Blissful Presence" ("Ich fuhle deinen odem"; Op. 39).

By 1894, Blake was working as a professional bass and actor in Los Angeles. He was engaged as a soloist for concerts given at multiple churches in L.A. including Unity Church and Simpson's Tabernacle. In February 1894, he gave a recital at Blanchard Hall. He was one of a small group of professional singers hired for a semi-professional production of Gilbert and Sullivan's Patience in Los Angeles, performing the role of Colonel Calverley in March 1894. In April 1894 he was the bass soloist in Handel's Messiah with the Los Angeles Oratorio Society under conductor F. A. Bacon, a professor at the USC Thornton School of Music. That same month he was "the Herald" to the Queen of Los Angeles's Fiesta Ball (a role which was fulfilled that year by the wife of Ozro W. Childs), and portrayed Captain George D'Alroy in T. W. Robertson's play Caste at the Los Angeles Theater.

In May 1894 Blake was a guest soloist in a concert given by the Woman's Orchestra of Los Angeles at the city's Grand Opera House. He returned to the Los Angeles Theater in multiple productions staged from May through June 1894, including H.M.S. Pinafore (as Dick Deadeye), Cox and Box, The Mikado (as Poo-Bah), and Humphrey John Stewart's Robin Hood (as Ralph, the Chief of Outlaws), He then performed with the Pyke Opera Company in Sacramento, California, in productions of Johann Strauss II's Das Spitzentuch der Königin, Charles Lecocq's Le petit duc and Procida Bucalossi's Les Manteaux Noirs (as Don Jose) in August and September 1894.

Blake returned to Los Angeles in October 1894. He gave another recital at Blanchard Hall on November 22, 1894, and that same month performed in a series of Sunday night concerts presented at Los Angeles's Grand Opera House led by conductor A. J. Stamm. He performed the role of Alfio in a concert version of Cavalleria rusticana at the Pasadena Presbyterian Church in December 1894. In January 1895 he directed a musical pantomime that was staged as a charity fundraiser to benefit homeless youth in Los Angeles. He composed the song "Brother's Lullaby" for performance in this production. That same month he performed in a concert at the Jonathan Club, a social club in L.A. of which he was a member. In February 1895 he returned to the Los Angeles Theater in a musical entitled Home, Sweet, Home, and in the role of King Solomon in Karl Goldmark's Die Königin von Saba (performed in English under the title King Solomon).

== Early career on the national stage ==
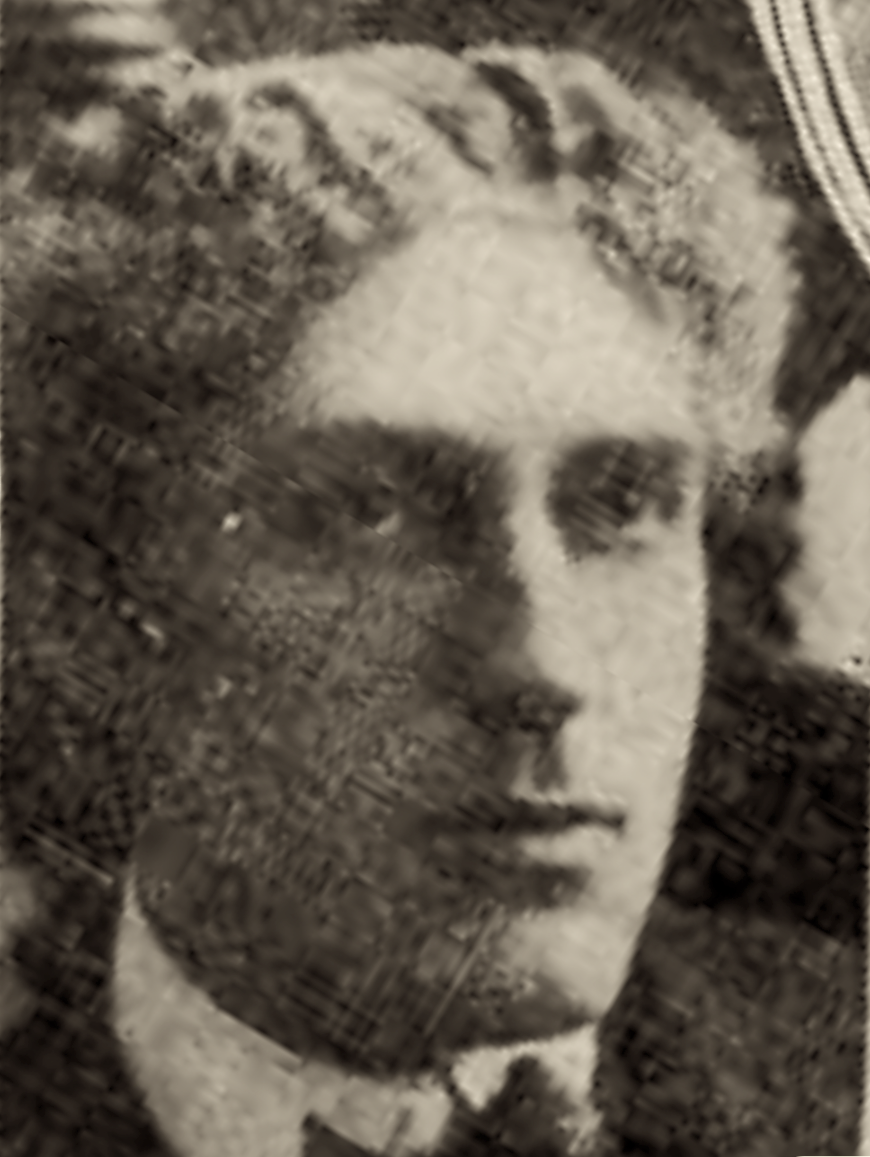
Winfield Blake in 1902

By March 1895 Blake had left Los Angeles and was once again with the Pyke Opera Company, starring as Boleslas, chief of the Tzigani in a new production of Francis Chassaigne's Falka in addition to reprising some of his earlier roles with the company in Seattle. He toured with the company through June 1895 with stops in Wyoming; Utah; and Victoria, British Columbia. His other repertoire with the company included Dick Deadeye in H.M.S. Pinafore and Poo-Bah in The Mikado. In August and September 1895 he was performing with the Dunbar Opera Company, again as Boleslas in Falka for performances in Denver, Colorado; North Platte, Nebraska; and Cheyenne, Wyoming.

In early 1896 Blake was touring as a member of Lilly Clay's burlesque troupe which included a stop at Sam T. Jack's Opera House in Chicago. In April 1896 he starred in Joseph Hart's musical A Gay Old Boy at the Academy in Washington D.C. In May 1896 he was one of several performers featured during the grand opening of Forest Park Highlands in St. Louis.

Blake created the role of Sergeant Sabre in the original production of Julian Edwards and Stanislaus Stange's comic opera The Wedding Day. The work premiered for the grand opening of the newly renovated Wieting Opera House in Syracuse, New York, on September 15, 1896. The production by Jefferson De Angelis's opera troupe moved to Broadway's Casino Theatre where it opened on April 8, 1897, running for a total of 36 performances. In July 1897 he repeated the role of Poo-Bah in The Mikado in a performance given to benefit the Shearith Israel Sisterhood charity, and later returned to the role again for a charity benefit at the Waldorf Astoria New York in January 1898. He returned to Broadway later that year in another original light opera by Stange and Edwards, The Jolly Musketeer, in which he portrayed the part of Capote. It was staged at the Broadway Theatre where it opened on November 14, 1898. He toured in The Jolly Musketeer in 1898–1899 to Brooklyn; Philadelphia; Wilmington, Delaware; Baltimore; Washington D. C.; Boston; and St. Louis.

Blake starred in a third original comic opera by Julian Edwards in 1900 presented by the troupe of Jefferson De Angelis, The Princess Chic, this time with a libretto by Kirke La Shelle. In this opera he portrayed the real historical figure of Charles the Bold, the Duke of Burgundy, but in a fictitious plot in which his character has a romance with the Princess Chic of Normandy at a time when he is in conflict with Louis XI. The opera premiered on New Year's Day 1900 at the Lafayette Square Opera House in Washington D. C., and then toured to the Columbia Theatre in Boston where it opened on January 16, 1900. The work then played at Broadway's Casino Theatre from February 12, 1900, through March 3, 1900. He then toured with the production in 1900–1901 for performances at the Grand Opera House in London, Ontario; the Grand Opera House in Toronto; the Walnut Street Theatre in Philadelphia; Ford's Grand Opera House in Baltimore; the Lyceum Theatre in Scranton, Pennsylvania; the Grand Opera House in Dubuque, Iowa; Greene's Opera House in Cedar Rapids; the Grand Opera House in Chicago; the Grand Theater in Topeka, Kansas; the Grand Opera House in Burlington, Iowa; the Masonic Temple in Fort Wayne, Indiana; and DeGive's Grand Opera House in Atlanta.

== Advocate for music institutions in the United States ==
In the May 19, 1897, issue of The Musical Courier, a letter written by Blake to the paper's editor was published in which he advocated for the creation of an opera company in the city of New York that featured American opera singers, and which would stage works by American composers. At the time Blake wrote this letter, The Musical Courier had recently questioned whether the Metropolitan Opera, then only a year old, would survive, and the paper had acknowledged the dominance of European singers and composers on the American stage. Blake's letter was a response to these opinions. Blake's letter inspired many responses, and for weeks after The Musical Courier published many replies to his letter in succeeding issues. A second letter written by Blake which detailed efforts he made in conjunction with several supporters to establish a national movement and fundraising effort to support opera in America and more broadly resident American music institutions appeared in the paper's June 23, 1897, issue.

Blake's ideas expanded further, and he became a leading voice in a national conversation around the establishment of resident orchestras, opera companies, and conservatories in America at a time when most American musicians had to travel to Europe to receive musical education, and when most American cities did not have permanent orchestras, opera companies, or music schools. His role as a main leader in this national conversation and its connected movement was profiled in the Los Angeles Times on August 29, 1897. Others working with Blake in this movement included composers Dudley Buck, Bruno Klein, Harry Rowe Shelley, and Frederick Grant Gleason; voice teacher and Columbia University researcher Floyd S. Muckey; and Herbert Wilber Greene, the founder of the Metropolitan College of Music in New York. This movement led to the establishment of the American Patriotic Music League in September 1897 with Gleason as the organization's president, and Blake employed as the organization's secretary. Its headquarters were located inside Carnegie Hall.

== Blake and Amber ==
=== San Francisco vaudeville ===
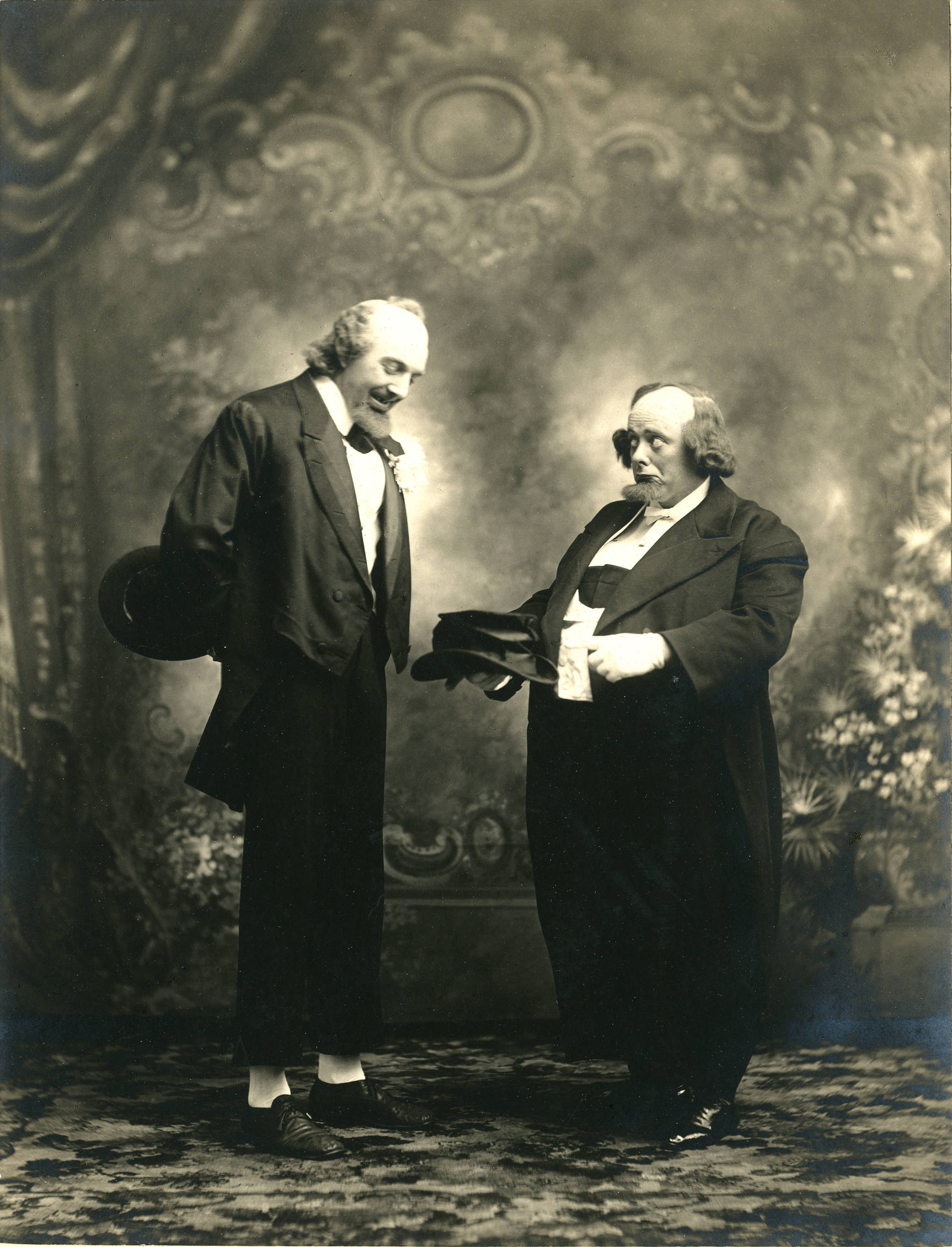
Kolb and Dill

In 1902 Blake married the actress Maude Amber. Together they formed a comedic duo known as Blake and Amber. The duo starred alongside Kolb and Dill and Barney Bernard in the vaudeville show Hurley Burly. They performed this work at Fischer's Theatre in San Francisco in 1902. The pair worked regularly at Fischer's Theatre for the next several years, often in collaboration with Kolb, Dill, and Bernard.

Other works Blake and Amber performed in at Fischer's included the Weber and Fields work Fiddle-dee-dee (1902 and 1903); Basil Hood and Walter Slaughter's musical The French Maid (1902); Louis De Lange and Edgar Smith's burlesque Pousse Cafe (1902); Captain R. Marshall and William Furst's A Royal Family (1902); a burlesque parody of Shakespeare's Antony and Cleopatra (1902); John Stromberg and Edgar Smith's burlesques Whirl-i-gig (1902) and Hoity Toity (1903 and 1904); a burlesque parody of The Geisha entitled The Geezer (1902); Stromberg and Smith's musical Helter Skelter (1903); Judson Brusie and Humphrey John Stewart's musical I.O.U. (1903 and 1904); Edgar Smith and W.T. Francis's burlesque The Big Little Princess (1903); W.T. Francis, John Stromberg, and Edgar Smith's musical Twirly Whirly (1903); Under the Red Globe (1903) which was a Weber and Fields parody of Stanley J. Weyman's Under the Red Robe; Robert Hood Bowers's musical Rubes and Roses (1903); and a burlesque parody of Clyde Fitch's play Barbara Frietchie entitled Barbara Fidgety (1903). They also performed a parody of Paul M. Potter's The Conquerors entitled The Con-Curers (1903) and J. C. Crawford's musical The Beauty Shop (1904).

=== International performers ===
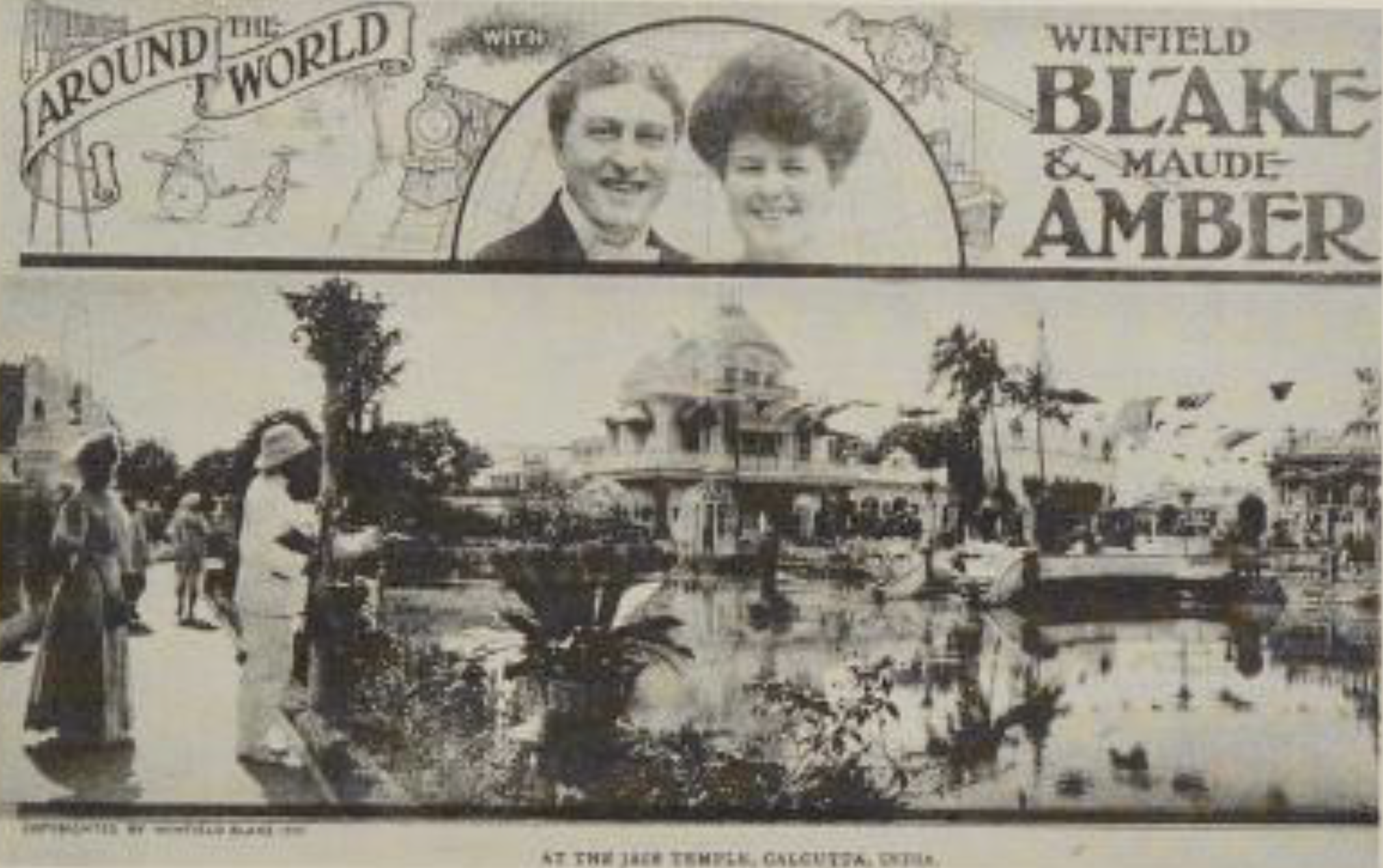
A postcard from India featuring Blake and Amber. Published in 1910. The couple sent a series of 25 unique postcards to Billboard magazine to promote their 1910 international performance tour entitled "Around the World".

In March 1904 Blake and Amber performed a show of Weber and Fields sketches in Austin, Texas. That same year they toured Australia and South Africa with Kolb, Dill, and Bernard in performances of Hoity Toity, Hurley Burly, and Fiddle-dee-dee. On their way to Australia, the group, billed as "The American Travesty Stars", stopped in Hawaii for performances at the Orpheum Theatre in Honolulu in May and June 1904. Beginning in July 1904, the American Travesty Stars performed a season of works at the Palace Theatre, Sydney. After their final performance at that theatre in October 1904, the company went to Melbourne where they performed the same season of works at the Melbourne Opera House in October–November 1904. In December 1904 the company performed at His Majesty's Theatre in Geelong, and then returned to Sydney for more performances at the Palace Theatre.

The majority of the American Travesty Stars company left Australia on January 2, 1905, at the conclusion of their tour. However, Blake and Amber remained in Australia for a season of performances at the Criterion Theatre in Sydney in a troupe managed by John F. Sheridan in 1905. Blake received particularly good reviews for his performance of the title role in Gustav Luders's King Dodo with Amber portraying Queen Lili. They were committed to Sheridan's company until the season ended in September 1905. In 1906 Blake and Amber toured China and Japan with the magician Howard Thurston.

Blake and Amber spent five years performing in music halls and theaters in the United Kingdom. By June 1907 they were in South London performing at the Empress Theatre in Brixton where they were a popular success with English audiences. Later that year they performed at the Oxford Music Hall in Westminster with the New-York Tribune critic writing the following:

Their act is an affair of hurricane swiftness, In which the blatancies of cheap melodrama and the methods of grand opera artists are delightfully skitted. Both Winfield and Maude sing capitally in the "straight" way, but the spirit of grotesqueness and broad caricature prevails, and the turn is, to borrow a colloquialism from the other side, "a scream" from start to finish.

Blake was a prominent member of the Variety Artistes' Federation in the UK, serving on that union's executive committee during the early years of the organization. Both Blake and Amber supported the Music Hall Ladies Guild as well. In 1908 they worked at the Vaudeville Club in London, the Olympia Theatre in Shoreditch, the Rotherhithe Hippodrome, the Empire Theatre in Croydon, the Bedford Music Hall in Camden Town, the Winter Gardens, Blackpool, the Hamilton Hippodrome in Scotland, and the Canterbury Music Hall. In 1909 they returned to the Empress Theatre in Brixton, and toured the British provinces.

In early 1910 Blake and Amber were engaged at the Palace Theatre, London. They then spent three months performing in variety theatre in South Africa. They returned to the United Kingdom where they were engaged for performances at The Empire in Liverpool. In December 1910 they embarked on an international tour which they billed as Blake and Amber's "Around the World" tour. After returning to England, they were engaged at the London Hippodrome in October 1911.

=== Return to theatre in North America ===
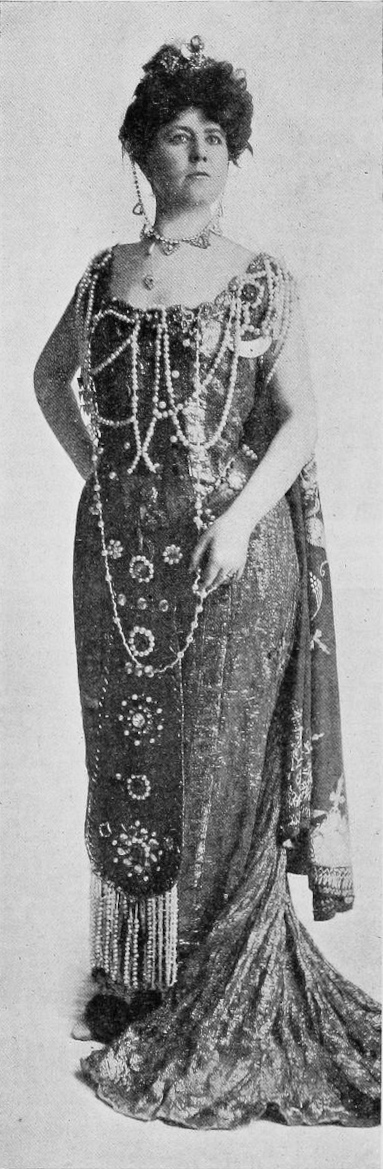
Maude Amber

In December 1911 Blake and Amber returned to the United States after six years abroad. In 1912 the couple starred in variety programs at the Garrick Theatre in Wilmington, Delaware, the National Theatre in Boston and at the Fifth Avenue Theatre on Broadway. They also worked in several vaudeville theaters in the United States and Canada, including Orpheum Circuit theaters in Reading, Pennsylvania, Altoona, Pennsylvania, and Montreal, Canada. In January 1913 they returned to San Francisco performing at the Savoy Theatre. In February 1913, they starred alongside Kolb and Dill in a production of Victor Herbert's Algeria at the Grand Opera House in Santa Ana, California, and the Majestic Theatre in Los Angeles.

In September 1913 Blake and Amber performed at the grand opening of the new headquarters of the San Francisco Press Club (SFPC). Blake and Amber co-wrote an original musical, The Follies of the Fair, which the SFPC staged in April 1914. The success of this production led to the creation of the San Francisco Stage Society, of which Blake was elected director general, with his wife serving as treasurer. Also in 1914, Blake starred in the premiere of George Sterling's play The Flight. He later originated the role of Atticus in Sterling's musical The Twilight of the Kings with the Bohemian Club in 1918. This work used music by Wallace Arthur Sabin and was staged at the Cort Theatre in San Francisco.

In January 1915 Blake directed a vaudeville stage show for the SFPC which was reviewed well in the local press. In 1918 he directed and produced the Fairmont Follies at the Fairmont San Francisco, continuing to produce and direct new iterations of the show in 1919. This show toured to Santa Barbara and Pasadena. In addition to producing and directing the show, Blake also designed the production's costumes. In 1925 he directed the world premiere of Thomas Vincent Cator's musical The Beggar of Bagdad at the Victory Theatre in San Jose, California.

=== Later life as talent managers and costume designers ===
In the autumn of 1913 Blake applied for a booking agent's license with the intent of starting his own talent management firm. Soon after he began managing vaudeville talent, sometimes writing material for the artists he managed. After this, Blake and Amber's appearances on the stage significantly diminished as their attentions became invested in this business venture. The firm, the Blake & Amber Booking Office of San Francisco, expanded outside of California in 1920 when it opened a second office in Salt Lake City with the intent of setting up a musical comedy "touring wheel" in which performers would appear in a theater circuit across California, Utah, Idaho, Montana, and Colorado.

By 1924 Blake and Amber were no longer performing. They divided their time between three different businesses: their talent management firm, a costume company, and teaching actors their craft.

On Sunday, April 10, 1932, Blake suffered an apoplectic stroke. He died on April 12, 1932, in San Francisco, California, at age 63.

== Selected works ==
- "Unrequited" (1900), lyrics by Winfield Blake; music by G. J. Couchois
- The Follies of the Fair (1914), musical book and lyrics by Winfield Blake; music by Maude Amber
