= Sophie Brandt =

American opera singer

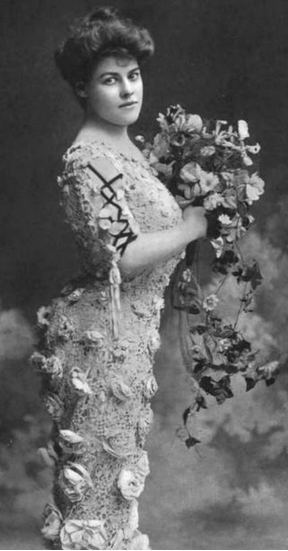
Sophie Brandt, from a 1904 publication

Sophie Brandt (born Sophie Barth, July 2, 1876 – February 4, 1946) was an American actress and soprano. A native of St. Louis, Missouri, she made her stage debut in 1899 in the play A False Alarm. She had an active career in musical theatre and opera that extended from 1903 until 1922. After touring the United States extensively in light operas from 1904-1906, she starred in several Broadway shows in 1908-1909, and performed in one light opera with Oscar Hammerstein I's company in 1910.

Brandt toured in operettas and in vaudeville in the early 1910s, and then went to Italy to pursue further vocal training. There she made her grand opera debut in Naples in 1916. She was active as an opera singer in Italy during the late 1910s at La Scala and the Teatro di San Carlo, and in 1920 performed with the Carl Rosa Opera Company in England. After her marriage to her second husband in London in 1921, she was known in private life as Mrs. William Burlock. She and her husband returned the United States and settled in Chicago. Her last performances in operettas were in 1922 with the St. Louis Municipal Opera. After this she continued to periodically perform in concerts, recitals, and on American radio until as late as 1927.

== Life and career ==
The daughter of Felix and Marie Barth (née Brandt), Sophie Barth was born on July 2, 1876, in St. Louis. (Note: Primary sources give conflicting information on Brandt's date of birth. The Illinois, U.S., Deaths and Stillbirths Index, 1916-1947 gives her date of birth as c. 1892 A 1934 passenger manifest gives her date of birth as July 2, 1889. Her United States passport gives her date of birth as July 2, 1886, and contains the names of her parents, Felix and Marie. This exact date of birth is identical in another passenger manifest from 1921 which gives her name as Sophie Barth Brandt Burlock. However, all of these dates are contradicted by the 1880 United States Federal Census record for St. Louis, Missouri which give's Sophie's age of birth as 4 years old and states she was born in c. 1876. The census record is dated to November 1880, and contains the names of her parents identical to her passport. Given that her date of birth is given as July 2 in multiple primary documents, she would have been four years old in November 1880 with a date of birth of July 2, 1876. Note that The Actors Birthday Book gives her date of birth as July 4, but this date does not match any primary documents and is likely in error.) Barth made her stage debut using her birth name in 1899 with the Columbia Comedy Company in the farce A False Alarm at the Columbia Theater in Saint Louis. She adopted the stage name Sophie Brandt; which she was using as early as 1903 while in the touring company of Edward E. Kidder's A Pass for Two. Prior to this she married her first husband, Ellsworth Ives Chapman, on February 7, 1900 in Chicago.

In 1904 Brandt starred as Nanetta in the premiere of Frederic Coit Wright and Cornelia Osgood Tyler's comic opera A Venetian Romance which was given in New London, Connecticut in what was described as Brandt's stage debut. She was hired for this part by Frank L. Perley. She subsequently toured in this part to the Chestnut Street Opera House in Philadelphia. Reviews of her singing were positive, but her overall performance was marred by an uncomfortable nervousness on stage and she was replaced by Genevieve Day by the time the production reached Broadway in May 1904.

After this, Brandt traveled to London, England where she was engaged by Henry W. Savage for a production of Gustav Luders's operetta The Prince of Pilsen. The production opened in July 1904 at the Shaftesbury Theatre with Brandt receiving positive reviews for her performance as the widow Mrs. Crocker. Upon returning to America she succeeded Christie MacDonald in the title role of The Princess Chic for the show's 1904-1905 national tour. For the 1905-1906 season she toured as Mary Tudor in Harry B. Smith and Ludwig Engländer's comic opera A Madcap Princess; a role that was originally a success for Lulu Glaser.

In 1908 Brandt made her Broadway debut as Franzi Steingruber in the Oscar Straus operetta A Waltz Dream at the Broadway Theatre. She returned to Broadway later that year as Marie Dubois in Julian Edwards's musical The Gay Musician at Wallack's Theatre, and replaced Ida Brooks Hunt as Zoradie in the Broadway cast of Victor Herbert's Algeria in September 1908. In 1909 she toured in A Waltz Dream prior to traveling to Paris where she studied singing to prepare for a career in grand opera. She had left the United States for Europe in May 1909. She studied voice with Frank King Clark in both France and in Germany, and while in Europe it was announced she had signed a contract with Oscar Hammerstein I's opera company in July 1910.

Brandt returned to the United States in August 1910, and soon after made her debut with Hammerstein's company as Lisbeth in the premiere Louis Ganne's light opera Hans, the Flute Player at the Manhattan Opera House on September 20, 1910. In December 1910 she portrayed the title role in Felix Albini's Madame Troubadour at the Chicago Grand Opera House. In 1911 she performed in The Gay Musician in Saint Louis, and January 1912 she gave her first performance in vaudeville at the Fifth Avenue Theatre, and toured in Paul M. Potter's Halfway to Paris.

By 1915 Brandt was in Italy pursuing further studies in opera, and she finally performed in her first grand opera, Georges Bizet's Carmen, in Naples in 1916. She performed in grand opera in Italy at the Teatro di San Carlo in Naples, the Teatro Bellini, Naples, and at La Scala in Milan. In 1920 she performed the title role in Carmen with the Carl Rosa Opera Company in England. In April 1921 she married her second husband, William Elliot Burlock, in London, England. Burlock was an American theatre manager and talent agent. They moved back to the United States where they made their home in Chicago.

In 1922 Brandt starred in a season of light operas with the St. Louis Municipal Opera, and in 1923-1924 she performed in vaudeville in Chicago. In 1925 she gave a recital in Lexington, Kentucky sponsored by the Women's Club of Central Kentucky that included music by Johannes Brahms, Amilcare Ponchielli, and Amy Beach. In 1926 she gave a concert with Ramon Girvin's Little Symphony Orchestra in Chicago, and performed a recital on WMAQ radio where she was billed as a mezzo-soprano after long being labeled a soprano. She worked as a radio singer for WMAQ in 1927.

Sophie Brandt Burlock died on February 4, 1946 in Chicago, Illinois.
