= Melville Collins =

American musical theatre actor, baritone, composer and pianist

- Born: Melville Stanley Collins; December 4, 1878; Middletown, Ohio, U.S.
- Died: April 1, 1924 (aged 45); Brooklyn, New York, U.S.
- Occupations: Actor, singer, composer, pianist
- Spouse: Lillian M Skelding (m. 1914)
- Parents: Stanford Collins; Elizabeth Collins

Melville Collins (December 4, 1878 — April 1, 1924) was an American musical theatre actor, baritone in light operas, composer, and pianist. After beginning his stage career as a baritone with The Bostonians, he made his Broadway debut in 1900 as Louis XI in the original cast of Julian Edwards and Kirke La Shelle's operetta The Princess Chic. He then starred as Ned Royster in the 1902-1903 national tour of Reginald de Koven's Foxy Quiller and as Wakeful M. Jones in the 1903-1904 tour of Alfred G. Wathall and George Ade's The Sultan of Sulu.

In 1905 Collins starred in the Broadway musical The Sambo Girl with the actress Eva Tanguay as his romantic co-star. This began a longterm professional partnership between Collins and Tanguay, with Collins serving as her permanent accompanist in vaudeville for many years and also her manager on a periodic basis. Collins composed the music to the 1906 musical A Good Fellow which was created as a starring vehicle for Tanguay. He also wrote several songs for her, including the 1907 hit tune "Get Happy". According to Tanquay researcher and journalist Wes Eichenwald, Tanquay was deeply in love with Collins, but he never returned her feelings. Collins married Tanquay's niece, Lillian M Skelding, in 1914. He died in 1924 at the age of 45. In 1947 an urn containing his ashes was placed inside Tanquay's casket, and they were buried together.

== Early life and career ==
The son of Stanford and Elizabeth Collins, Melville Stanley Collins was born on December 4, 1878, in Middletown, Ohio. In his early career he worked as a baritone with The Bostonians. In 1900 he starred as Louis XI in the original cast of Julian Edwards and Kirke La Shelle's operetta The Princess Chic for performances at the Lafayette Square Opera House in Washington D. C., the Columbia Theatre in Boston, and Broadway's Casino Theatre.

In 1901 Collins was a principal actor in a revival of William Gill and Richard Golden's play Old Jed Prouty at the Walnut Theatre in Cincinnati, Ohio with Golden in the title role. He starred alongside Golden again in the 1902-1903 national tour of Reginald de Koven's Foxy Quiller in the role of the sailor Ned Royster. Some of the stops on this tour included performances at the Victoria Theatre in Victoria, British Columbia, the Myers Opera House in Janesville, Wisconsin, the Faurot Opera House in Lima, Ohio, the Broadway Theater in Denver, Colorado, the Grand Opera House in St. Louis and the Great Northern Theatre in Chicago.

Collins starred as Wakeful M. Jones in Alfred G. Wathall and George Ade's The Sultan of Sulu; touring in that show to Wallack's Theatre (1903), the Harlem Opera House (1903), and Chicago's Studebaker Theater (1904). With fellow The Sultan of Sulu castmate Walter Lawrence, he co-authored a book on stage calisthenics that was published by Macmillan Publishers in October 1903.

== Work with Eva Tanguay and later life ==
In 1905 Collins returned to Broadway as Raphael Rubens in the original cast of Gustav Kerker and Harry B. Smith's The Sambo Girl. In addition to acting in the musical, he also contributed the song "I'm for You" to the show. The musical marked the beginning of his relationship with the actress Eva Tanguay who portrayed the title character in the show in her first leading part in a professional production. Collins portrayed the main romantic lead in the musical opposite Tanguay as his love interest. The two formed a close friendship that led to a longterm professional collaboration. According to journalist Wes Eichenwald, a recognized authority on Tanquay, the actress was deeply in love with Collins but he never reciprocated her feelings. In 1914 Collins married Lillian M Skelding; the niece of Tanguay.

After The Sambo Girl left Broadway, Collins went on tour with the production in a modified vaudeville version of the show. During the tour he became Tanguay's manager after she fired Frank Norcross. Together, Tanguay and Collins developed a successful marketing and "star branding" strategy which Tanguay would use throughout her career. Later Collins worked only periodically as Tanguay's manager, but served as her accompanist for many years.

With the playwright Mark Swan (1871–1942) Collins created the musical A Good Fellow as a starring vehicle for Tanguay; composing the music to the show with Swan serving as both book writer and lyricist. It premiered at the Alvin Theatre in Pittsburgh, Pennsylvania in 1906. His compositional output for Tanquay also included the 1907 hit song "Get Happy" (1907). He also wrote the 1913 popular song "I'd Like to Give You Something that You've Never Had Before".

Collins died on April 1, 1924, in Brooklyn. He was 45 years old. When Eva Tanquay died in 1947, an urn containing Melville Collins's ashes was placed inside Tanquay's casket and they were buried together.
