= Marguerite Sylva =

Belgian singer and actress (1875–1957)

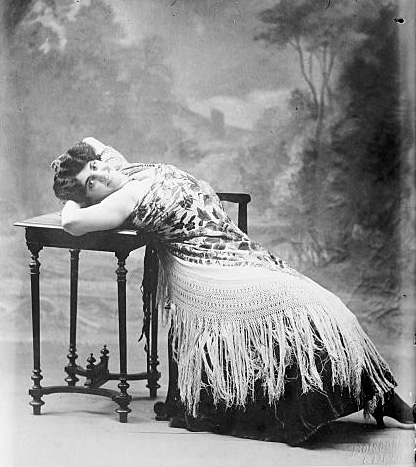
- Marguerite Sylva as Carmen, her signature role. (Paris circa 1906)
- Born: Marguerite Alice Hélène Smith; 5 July 1875; Brussels, Belgium
- Died: 21 February 1957 (aged 81); Glendale, California, U.S.
- Occupations: Mezzo-soprano, actress
- Years active: 1920–1945
- Spouse(s): William Mann (?–1912) divorced Bernard L. Smith (1915–1929) divorced (2 children)

Marguerite Sylva (also known as Marguerita Sylva) (05 July 1875 – 21 February 1957) was a Belgian born mezzo-soprano who achieved fame in opera, operetta, and musical theatre. She was particularly known for her performances in the title role of Bizet's Carmen, which she sang over 300 times in the course of her career. Sylva was a pioneering recording artist for Edison Records and made many recordings for the company from 1910 to 1912.

== Biography ==
Marguerite Sylva was born Marguerite Alice Hélène Smith in Brussel, to Mathilde (Schearer) Smith and Dr. Christian Charles Louis Smith, a Belgian of English parentage who was a consulting physician to the royal court of Belgium. Both she and her sister Edith were trained in music at the Belgian Royal Conservatory. Marguerite primarily studied the piano but also took private singing lessons. Edith went on to become a concert violinist of some renown, performing as Nadia Sylva.

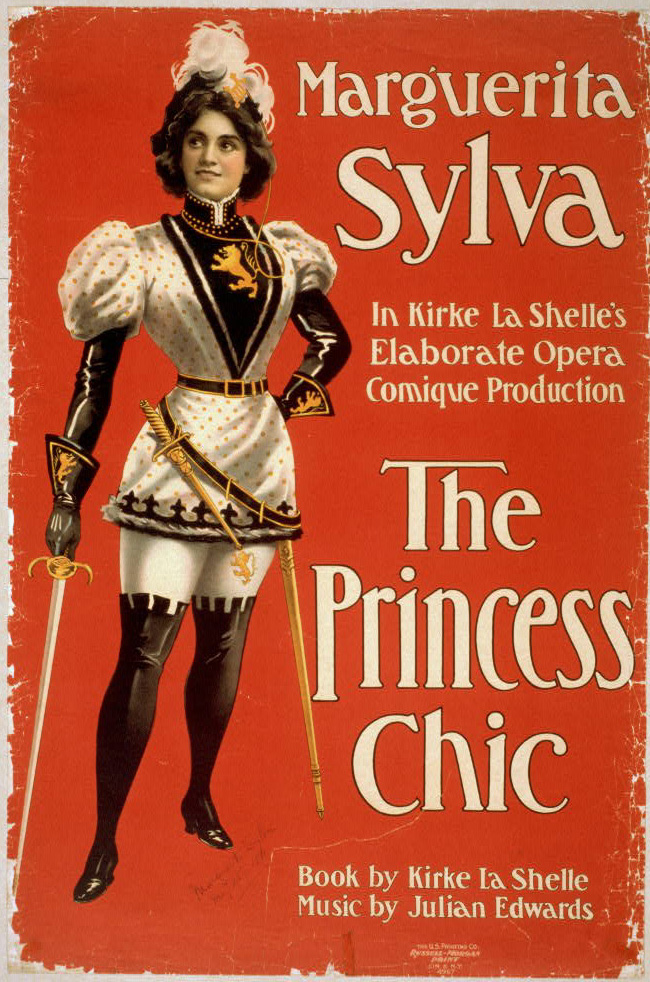
Marguerite Sylva on a poster of the Kirke La Shelle and Julian Edwards comic opera, The Princess Chic. The part was originated by Christie MacDonald in its original 1900 production. Sylva later took over the role for part of its tour which lasted until 1910.

According to Marguerite Sylva's entry in the 1935 edition of American Women, it was W. S. Gilbert who gave the sisters their stage names. In early 1896 they were in London, where Edith was to play her violin for Gilbert, with Marguerite providing the piano accompaniment. Sylva recalled that after Edith finished playing, Gilbert asked her, "Don't you do anything?". She told him she "sang a little" and proceeded to sing the Habanera from Carmen to him. He offered her a part in his upcoming production of The Grand Duke, but she turned it down saying that she wanted to "try grand opera first". After an audition with Augustus Harris, she was engaged to sing for the Drury Lane Theatre, and made her debut there in Carmen. However, with Harris' death in June 1896, her opera aspirations ended. Instead she went to the United States with Herbert Beerbohm Tree's theatre company for a production of Gilbert Parker's The Seats of the Mighty at the Knickerbocker Theatre. Amongst the actors in the company was Gerald Du Maurier to whom she became engaged. The young couple had planned to pursue musical theatre careers together in the United States, but in the end, the engagement was broken off. According to Beerbohm Tree, Sylva's mother had been opposed to the marriage.

Du Maurier returned to the London stage. Sylva remained in the United States where she carved out an increasingly successful career in musical comedy, operetta and vaudeville. She appeared in the world premiere of The Fortune Teller by Victor Herbert and toured several U.S. cities playing the leading roles in The Princess Chic, Miss Bob White, and The Strollers. She eventually formed the Marguerite Sylva Opera Company to produce comic operas and operettas under the management of Samuel F. Nixon and J. Fred Zimmerman. In 1902 she married the theatrical manager William David Mann. The couple left for France in 1904 where Sylva again became fascinated by opera. She found a teacher, Madame Delattre, and was soon engaged by the Opéra-Comique. She made her debut there on 14 September 1906 in the title role of Carmen to very good reviews. For the next three years Sylva sang with great success throughout France and Germany where she was a particular favourite. In 1909, Oscar Hammerstein invited her to return to America to sing for his opera company. On 1 September 1909, Marguerite Sylva made her American operatic debut as Carmen at the Manhattan Opera House.

In the ensuing years Sylva sang with Hammerstein's company (until a contractual dispute ended their professional relationship), the Boston Opera Company and with the San Carlo Opera Company in the United States. She also sang in Europe, including an acclaimed 1912 performance in Carmen at the Berlin Royal Opera with Enrico Caruso as Don José. She continued to appear on Broadway as well, with performances in the premieres of Gypsy Love and The Skylark. For a time, Sylva enjoyed a celebrity status normally accorded to movie stars, and even had her own line of cosmetics. In 2008, Mark Swed wrote in Los Angeles Times:

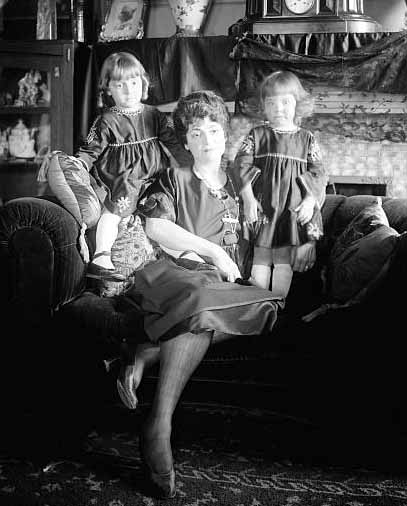
Marguerite Sylva with her daughters

"Carmen" is not new to the Hollywood Bowl. On July 8, 1922, three days before the first season of "Symphonies Under the Stars," the Los Angeles Philharmonic, itself only 3 years old, mounted a lavish production of Bizet's opera. The cast numbered nearly 500. Massive sets of Seville surrounded the brand-new amphitheater. When soprano Marguerita Sylva, who starred, rolled into Union Station five days earlier, reporters were there to greet her as if she were a movie star. Proceeds from the performance financed the installation of the Bowl's first benches.

Sylva and her husband, William Mann, had become estranged during her years in France and were divorced in 1912. On 1 December 1915, Sylva married Lieut. Bernard L. Smith, who at the time was the assistant naval attaché at the American Embassy in Paris. The couple later had two daughters, Daphnee and Marita, both of whom went on to have minor careers as actresses. The marriage ended in divorce on grounds of desertion in 1929. In her later years, Sylva lived in North Hollywood, where she played a series of small character roles in films and taught singing. A year before her death, she was the subject of the popular NBC television show This Is Your Life. Amongst those paying tribute to Sylva was the mezzo-soprano Mariska Aldrich who had sung with her in Hammerstein's opera company and whose career path had been somewhat similar to Sylva's. On 20 February 1957, Marguerite Sylva was driving her car when it went off the road and plowed into a house. She was severely injured in the accident and died the following day at the age of 81 in Behrens Memorial Hospital in Glendale, California.

== Opera roles ==
Although Marguerite Sylva's basic voice type was mezzo-soprano, she often took on soprano roles as well. Her roles in operetta and comic opera are included in this list.

- Carmen (Carmen)
- Cavalleria rusticana (Santuzza)
- Erminie (Erminie)
- Faust (Marguerite)
- Gypsy Love (Zorika)
- La bohème (Musetta (?))
- La favorite (Léonore)
- Le Chemineau (Catherine)
- Le Point d'Argentan (Rose-Marie)
- Les contes d'Hoffmann (Giulietta)
- Manon (Manon)
- Mignon (Mignon)
- Mireille (Taven)
- Pagliacci (Nedda)
- The Fortune Teller (Mlle. Pompom)
- The Princess Chic (Princess Chic of Normandy)
- Tosca (Tosca)
- Werther (Charlotte)

== On Broadway ==
Marguerite Sylva's American stage debut was in the play The Seats of the Mighty (1896). However, her early appearances on Broadway were mainly in musical comedies, comic operas and operettas. Sylva toured widely in the United States in this repertoire. This list is restricted to her known Broadway performances only:

- Mlle. Pompom in the premiere of The Fortune Teller an operetta by Victor Herbert (26 September - 29 October 1898)
- Lady Janet Belford in the premiere Mam'selle 'Awkins, a musical comedy by Herman Perlêt and Alfred E. Aarons (26 February - 31 March 1900.
- Erminie in the revival of Erminie, a comic opera by Edward Jakobowski (19 October - 28 November 1903)
- Zorika in the premiere of Gypsy Love, an English version of Zigeunerliebe, an operetta by Franz Lehár (17 October - 11 November 1911)
- Elsie in the premiere of The Skylark, a comedy by Thomas P. Robinson (25 July - August 1921)
- Sonya Orlova Varilovna in the premiere of Cousin Sonia, a comedy by Louis Verneuil (7 December 1925 - January 1926)
- Mooda in the premiere of Golden Dawn a musical by Emmerich Kalman (30 November 1927 – 5 May 1928)
- Mahuna in the premiere of Luana a musical comedy by Rudolf Friml (17 September - 4 October 1930
- Giulia Sabittini in the revival of The Great Lover, a comedy by Frederic and Fanny Hatton and Leo Ditrichstein (11 October - October 1932)
- Countess von Hohenbrunn in the premiere of Three Waltzes, a musical by Clare Kummer and Rowland Leigh from the play by Paul Knepler using music by Johann Strauss I, Johann Strauss II, and Oscar Straus (25 December 1937 – 9 April 1938)

== In film ==
Sylva's early venture into cinema was probably the title role in a 1913 silent film of Carmen shot in Nîmes, France with M. Habay (an actor with the Théâtre Sarah Bernhardt) as Don José. Her first major role in a Hollywood film came in 1920 when she played Hilda Wilson in The Honey Bee directed by Rupert Julian. Her other film roles included:

| Title | Year | Role | Director | Notes |
|---|---|---|---|---|
| The Honey Bee | 1920 | Hilda Wilson | Rupert Julian | |
| They Dare Not Love | 1941 | Countess Marlik | James Whale | uncredited |
| The Leopard Man | 1943 | Marta | Jacques Tourneur | uncredited |
| The Seventh Victim | 1943 | Mrs. Bella Romari | Mark Robson | |
| To Have and Have Not | 1944 | Cashier | Howard Hawks | uncredited |
| The Conspirators | 1944 | Older Woman | Jean Negulesco | uncredited |
| The Gay Senorita | 1945 | Doña Maria Sandoval | Arthur Dreifuss | |
| Her Highness and the Bellboy | 1945 | Diplomat's Wife | Richard Thorpe | uncredited |

== Recordings ==
"Pleurez, pleurez, mes yeux".
From Le Cid (1885); sung for Edison Records in 1910.
