= The Princess Chic =

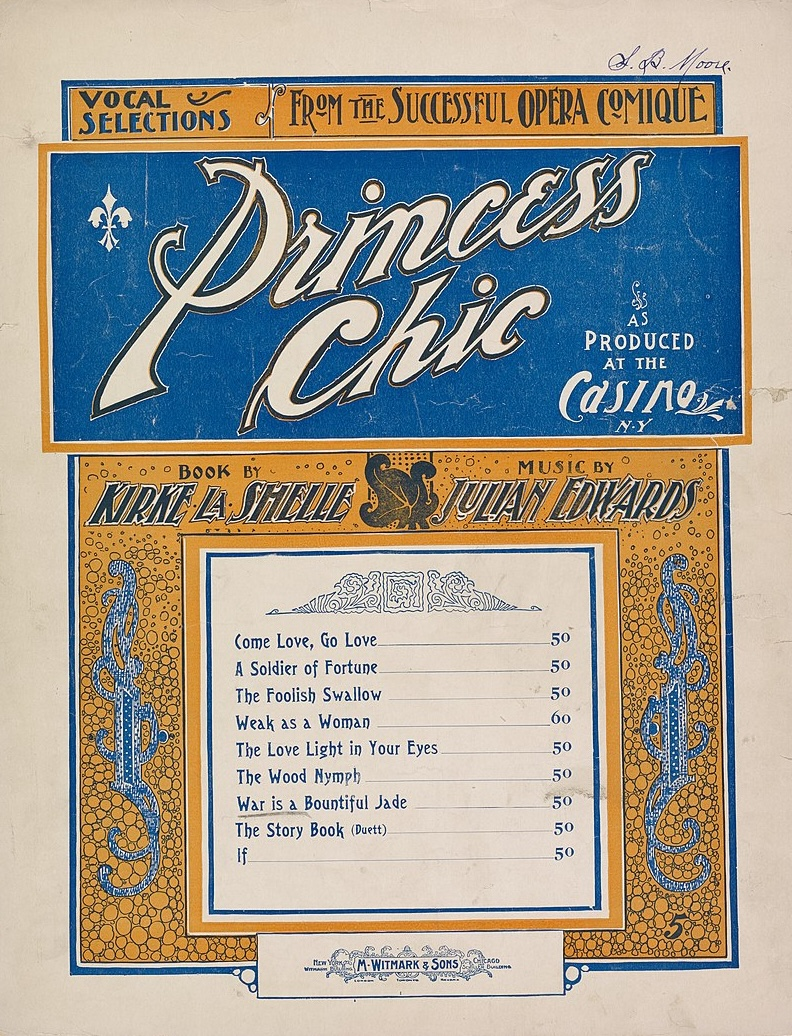
Sheet music for The Princess Chic.

The Princess Chic is an operetta in three acts with music by Julian Edwards and a libretto by Kirke La Shelle. Set in 15th century France, the work tells the tale of a fictional romance between Princess Chic of Normandy and Charles the Bold, the Duke of Burgundy during the time when the duke is in conflict with King Louis XI. While the operetta was not a success with New York critics and its Broadway run in 1900 was short, the work was ultimately profitable for its creators and had a lengthy tour that lasted ten years. The work is notable for forwarding the career of popular operetta soprano Christie MacDonald who portrayed the title role as her first leading part on the stage. Both musical selections from the operetta and a complete vocal score of the work were published by M. Witmark & Sons.

== Plot ==
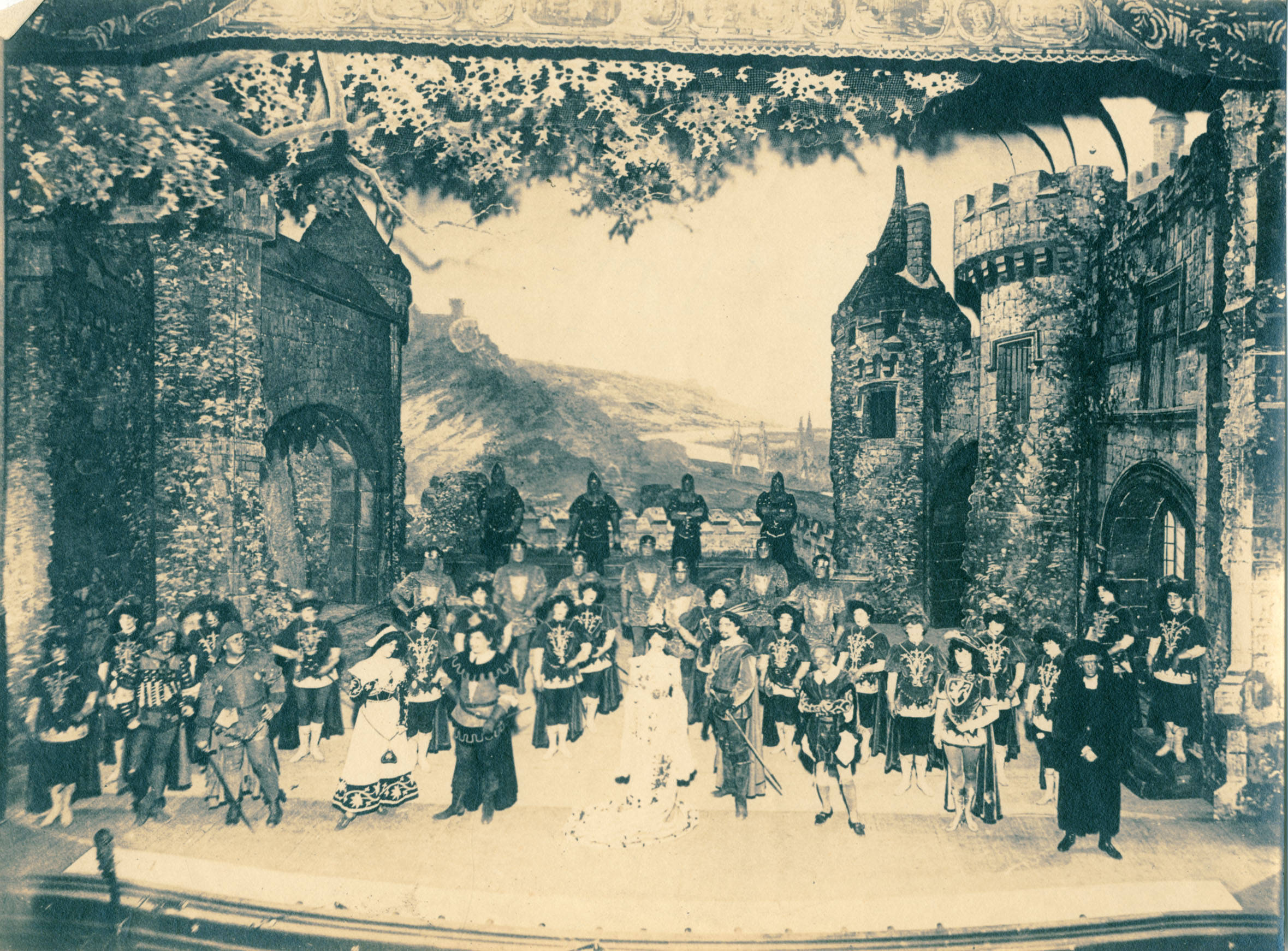
Scene in the Courtyard of the Duke's Chateau from The Princess Chic during its run at the Grand Opera House, Seattle in 1903.

Setting: Peronne, Burgundy, France in 1468

The plot of the operetta centers around the historical figure of Charles the Bold, the Duke of Burgundy, and his romance with the fictional Princess Chic of Normandy. The duke and the princess have never met but are betrothed. When the couple first meet, Charles mistakes the princess as one of her ladies-in-waiting; a mistake which she does not correct. During their conversation, she warns the duke of a plot against him orchestrated by King Louis XI. Later Princess Chic disguises herself as a peasant and spends time with the duke as both the princess and the peasant girl to try and ascertain his character and affections for her. Ultimately she is satisfied that he really loves her for her true self and reveals that she is both peasant and princess.

== Musical numbers ==
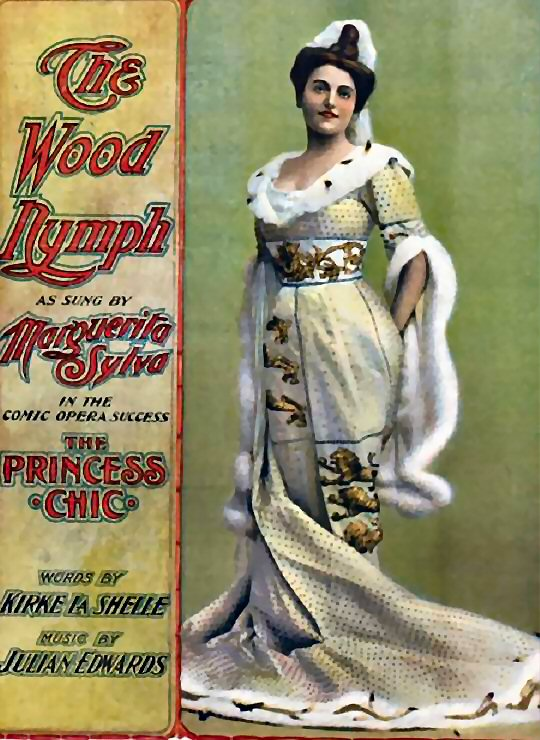
The Princess Chic sheet music featuring Marguerita Sylva, c. 1901

=== Act I: Courtyard of the Duke's Chateau ===
- Number 1a - Opening Men's Chorus - "Sing hey! to the wild-eyed, antlered stag; Sing hey! to the chase so keen..."
- Number 1b - Ensemble - Estelle, François and Male Chorus - "A greeting, merry gentlemen ... A greeting, fair Estelle! ..."
- Number 2 - Entrance of Duke, and Song with Male Chorus - "The Duke! The Duke! Give greeting to the Duke..."
- Number 3 - Trio - Brevet, Brabeau and Chambertin - "The soldier of fortune is gallant and gay..."
- Number 4 - Chorus and Song - Princess Chic - "We're blades of a temper both fine and tried..." & "An envoy's duty is to greet..."
- Number 5 - Song - Chambertin and Girls - "There was once a foolish swallow found of wine a brimming cup..."
- Number 6 - Ensemble Septette, and Song - Princess Chic - "Hold, I command! He dies who disobeys..."
- Number 7 - Song - Lorraine - "If I might tell you all my heart doth feel..."
- Number 8 - Finale Act I - "Save me! Oh, save me, save me, brave and gracious lord..."

=== Act II: Grand Hall of the Chateau ===
- Number 9 - Song - François and Chorus - "A gallant goes a-courting, a-courting, a-courting..."
- Number 10 - Duet - Brevet and Brabeau - "If only we lived in the olden days, when magic carpets did men amaze..."
- Number 11 - Chorus Entrance - "She's but a woman, he's but a man; noble is he and knightly..."
- Number 12 - Song - Princess Chic and Chorus - "'Tis said that love is a butterfly that dwells in a beautiful river..."
- Number 13 - Duet - Estelle and François - "A youth met a maiden with eyes of heaven's blue, once in a story book..."
- Number 14 - Quartette - Brevet, Brabeau, Chambertin and Pommard - "When a man says a thing, it should have a true ring..."
- Number 15 - Ensemble - "Fair Burgundy lifts up her voice in welcome to the King..."
- Number 16 - Song - Princess Chic - "A wood nymph lived in a old oak tree on a river's bend in a forest fair..."
- Number 17 - Finale Act I - "What does it mean? What can the trouble be? Is madness in the air? ..."

=== Act III: Courtyard of the Duke's Chateau ===
- Number 18 - Opening Chorus, and Song - Brevet - "There's a feeling of war in the air..." & "War gives to a lover the soldier bold..."
- Number 19 - Trio - Estelle, Brevet and Brabeau - "When a damsel meets with a fighting man, she always affects disdain..."
- Number 20 - Quartette - Chic, Lorraine, Duke and François - "Love came to me one day, decked out in colors gay..."
- Number 21 - Double Chorus, and "Love and War" Song - Chic - "The Princess's men at arms are we, the very flow'r of chivalry..."
- Number 22 - Finale Act III - "She's but a woman, he's but a man, noble is he and knightly..."

== Performance history and critical assessment ==
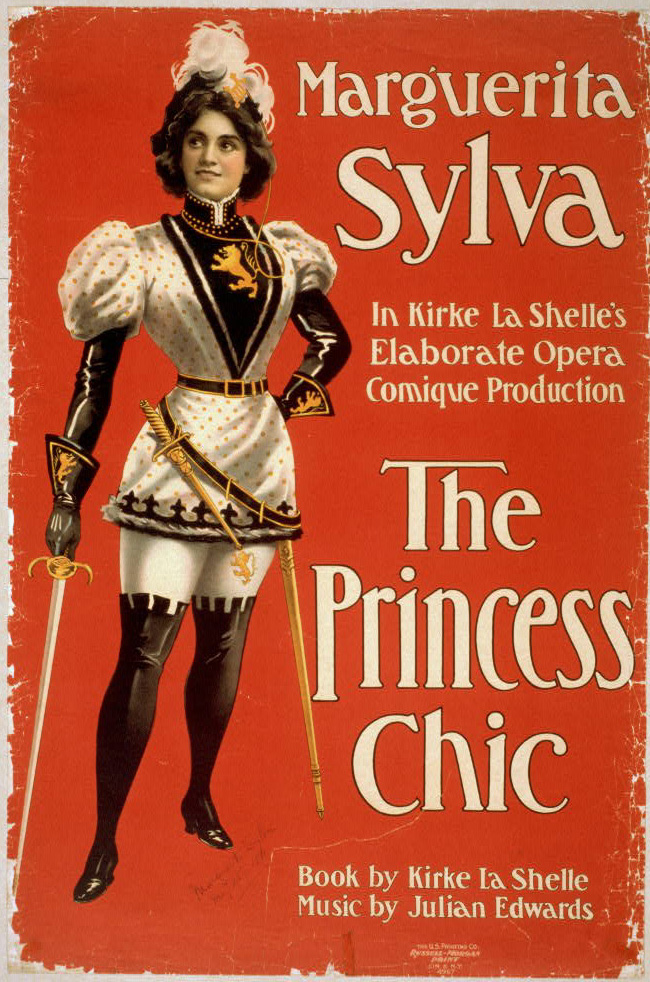
Marguerite Sylva in The Princess Chic.

The Princess Chic premiered on New Year's Day 1900 at the Lafayette Square Opera House in Washington D. C. with Minnie Methot in the title role. It then toured to the Columbia Theatre in Boston where it opened on January 16, 1900. During its Boston run, Christie MacDonald replaced Methot as Princess Chic due to a nagging injury in early February 1900. It was MacDonald's first leading role and she received critical acclaim in Boston in the part. The role launched her career as a popular soprano in operettas on Broadway when the work played at the Casino Theatre from February 12, 1900, through March 3, 1900. Others in the original cast included Winfield Blake as Duke Charles the Bold, Melville Collins as King Louis XI, Edgar Temple as Francois, Richard Golden as Chambertin, Joseph C. Miron as Brevet, Walter A. Lawrence as Brabeau, Mathilde Preville as Lorraine, Harry Brown as Pommard, Louise Willis Hepner as Estelle, E. S. Beverley as the Herald, and F. S. Dearduff as the Captain.

While it was initially speculated that The Princess Chic would transfer to another Broadway theatre after it completed its limited engagement at the Casino Theatre, this did not happen; possibly due to the criticisms in the New York press in regards to the work's libretto. New York critics were mostly complimentary of the score by Julian Edwards, but skewered the plot of the book by Kirke La Shelle. The New York Times review stated, "The development of the story is not at all skillful. Mr. La Shelle is apparently a mere novice in the art of dramatic construction, or he may have never given it any attention at all." The Washington Times critic Nancy Sykes was likewise impressed by Edwards music, describing it as "delightful", but dismissed the operetta's libretto as "very stupid". Harper's Weekly named The Princess Chic as one example of a librettist who had "wandered into an unproductive direction".

While the show's Broadway run was short and lasted only 22 performance, the show was ultimately very successful and had a long touring life which lasted 10 years. Several performers took on the role of Princess Chic during its tour, including Marguerite Sylva, Maude Lillian Berrl, Vera Michelena, and Sophie Brandt. Reviews in other cities tended to be more positive with the Detroit Free Press describing the work as "a razzle dazzle of fun, song, and dance" with "light and jingling music". Theatre historian Gerald Bordman described the operetta's score as "bold" for its period.

Sheet music of both the complete vocal score and individual selected musical numbers from the operetta were published by M. Witmark & Sons.
