= Quo Vadis (play) =

Play in six acts by Stanislaus Stange

Quo Vadis, sometimes given as Quo Vadis?, is a play in six acts by Stanislaus Stange that is based on Henryk Sienkiewicz's 19th century novel of the same name. It should not be confused with the play of the same name by Jeannette Leonard Gilder which also was staged on Broadway in the year 1900 during the same period of time.

== Production history ==
Quo Vadis premiered in Chicago at McVicker's Theater's on December 12, 1899.

The play's New York premiere took place at Broadway's New York Theatre on April 9, 1900. This production was directed by Max Freeman and produced by F. C. Whitney. The cast included William V. Ranous as Vitellius, Joseph Haworth as Vincius, Arthur Forrest as Petronius, Maude Fealy as Eunice, Margaret Fealy as Pomponia, and Lucia Moore as Paulina among others. In its production on Broadway, the production utilized incidental music by Julian Edwards. After the original Broadway production closed in July 1900, a revival was mounted just five months later at the Academy of Music where it opened on New Year's Eve 1900 and ran through the month of January 1901.

The United Kingdom premiere of the work took place at the West End's Adelphi Theatre on May 5, 1900; closing on June 1, 1900, after 28 performances.

== Reception ==
After the Chicago premier, The Chicago Tribune said the play needed to be revised and shortened.

After the Broadway opening, The New York Times also said the play was too long, but was well acted and well staged. A review of the Broadway production in The Sun said the acting was mostly good, but criticized the rest of the production, including what it called "ineffective music" and "garish" scenery.
