= The Wedding Day (opera) =

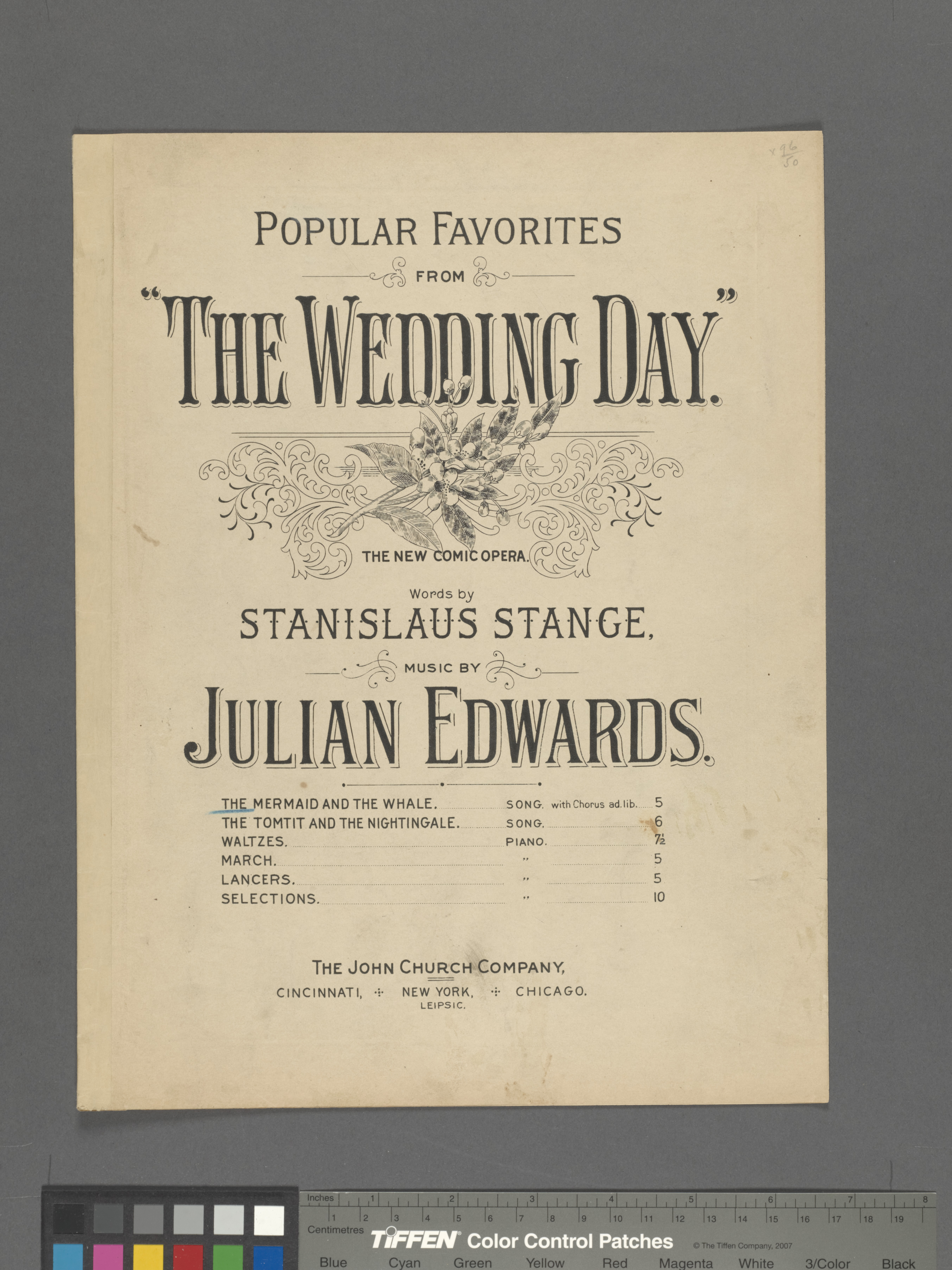
Front cover of sheet music from The Wedding Day, published 1897

The Wedding Day is a comic opera in three acts with music by Julian Edwards and a libretto by Stanislaus Stange. Prior to a production on Broadway, the work premiered for the grand opening of the newly renovated Wieting Opera House in Syracuse, New York, on September 15, 1896. It was staged at The Boston Theatre where it began a two-week run on February 7, 1897. Critic Roland Burke Hennessy of The Illustrated American wrote, "I consider The Wedding Day to be by far the best native comic opera we have had in many a year."

The original production moved to Broadway's Casino Theatre where it opened on April 8, 1897, running for a total of 36 performances. The production was directed by Richard Barker and used sets designed by Ernest Albert and costumes by Caroline Siedle. The cast included Lillian Russell as Lucille D' Herblay, Jefferson De Angelis as Polycop, Della Fox as Rose-Marie, Winfield Blake as Sergeant Sabre, and May Cuthbert as Mille Courcey among others.

The Wedding Day was revived by Henry W. Savage's Boston-based Castle Square Opera Company in 1901 who presented performances of the work on tour to Chicago at The Studebaker in May of that year. The Castle Square cast was led by soprano Gertrude Quinlan.

== Bibliography ==
- Beauchamp, William Martin (1908). Past and Present of Syracuse and Onondaga County, New York: From Prehistoric Times to the Beginning of 1908. S. J. Clarke Publishing Company.
- Fields, Armond (2008). Lillian Russell: A Biography of "America's Beauty". McFarland & Company. ISBN 978-0-7864-3868-6.
- Letellier, Robert Ignatius (2015). Operetta: A Sourcebook. Vol. II. Cambridge Scholars Publishing. ISBN 9781443885089.
- Schwartz, Donald R.; Bowbeer, Anne A. (1997). Lillian Russell: A Bio-Bibliography. Bloomsbury Academic. ISBN 9780313277641.
- Tompkins, Eugene; Kilby, Quincy (1908). The History of the Boston Theatre, 1854–1901. Houghton Mifflin.
