= Kirke La Shelle =

American dramatist (1862–1905)

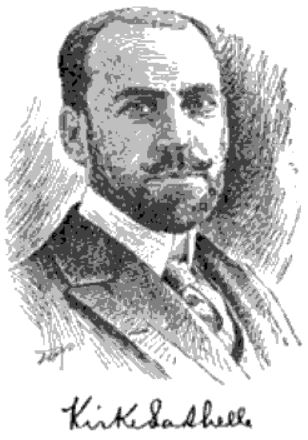
- Kirke La Shelle c. 1904
- Born: Martin Kirk LaShells; September 23, 1862; Wyoming, Illinois, US
- Died: May 16, 1905 (aged 42); Bellport, New York, US
- Occupations: Journalist, Playwright and Theatrical Producer
- Spouse: Mazie Elizabeth Nodine (1893-1905)
- Children: Mazie Marie c. 1898; Kirke c. 1901

Kirke La Shelle (September 23, 1862 – May 16, 1905) was an American journalist, playwright and theatrical producer. He was known for his association with such successful productions as The Wizard of the Nile, The Princess Chic, Beside the Bonnie Brier Bush, Arizona, The Earl of Pawtucket, The Virginian, The Education of Mr. Pipp and The Heir to the Hoorah. La Shelle's career as a playwright and producer was relatively brief due to an illness that led to his demise at the age of forty-two.

== Early life ==
Milton Kirk LaShells was born at Wyoming, Illinois the son of Sarah Williams and James Ralph LaShells. His father, the son of a prominent Philadelphia lawyer, settled in Stark County around 1844 where he farmed and later worked as a tradesman. La Shelle's mother was a native of Vermont. His father lost his first wife, Harriet, in May 1850 to tuberculosis. The same fate befell La Shelle's mother when he was just seven years old. James LaShells later relocated to Biggs, California where he died in 1888 at the age of 80.

In his early teens La Shelle began his newspaper career as a printer's apprentice with the Wyoming Post Herald.

== Newspaper years ==
While still in his teens La Shelle joined the printing department of the Chicago Telegraph and eventually rose to be a foreman with the same division at the Chicago Morning News. La Shelle later became a newspaper reporter, drama critic and would, during the 1880s, go on to hold a number of reporting and editorial positions with several Chicago area newspapers. In the early 1880s La Shelle spent a year or two in Bismarck, Dakota Territory as editor of the Bismarck Tribune and later founding editor of an evening paper called the Daily Advertiser. By 1884 La Shelle returned to Chicago, where he continued working on Chicago papers and at some point composed poetry that appeared in The Ladies Home Journal. In 1891 La Shelle left the dramatic desk of The Chicago Mail to join the English actor E. S. Willard as his business manager and advance man for an upcoming American tour.

== Theatre ==
From 1892 to 1895 La Shelle served as general manager and director of the Bostonians, a theatrical troupe previously known as the Boston Ideal Opera Company. It was during this period that La Shelle first met with success as a producer when the Bostonians presented the comic opera Robin Hood.

In 1895 La Shelle partnered with Arthur F. Clarke, the Bostonians’ former business manager and advance man, to back the Frank Daniels’ Comic Opera Company. Their first production The Wizard of the Nile, a comic operetta by Victor Herbert and Harry B. Smith, proved to be a huge success that earned its producers a fortune. La Shelle and Clarke followed with Daniels’ successful productions of the comic operas The Idol's Eye (1897), by Smith and Herbert, The Ameer (1899), written by La Shelle in collaboration with Frederic Ranken, and Miss Simplicity (1901) from R. A. Barnet and Harry Lawson Heartz.

In 1899 La Shelle directed a touring company headed by Wilton Lackaye that presented a stage adaptation of the Charles Lever novel, Charles O'Malley, the Irish Dragoon.

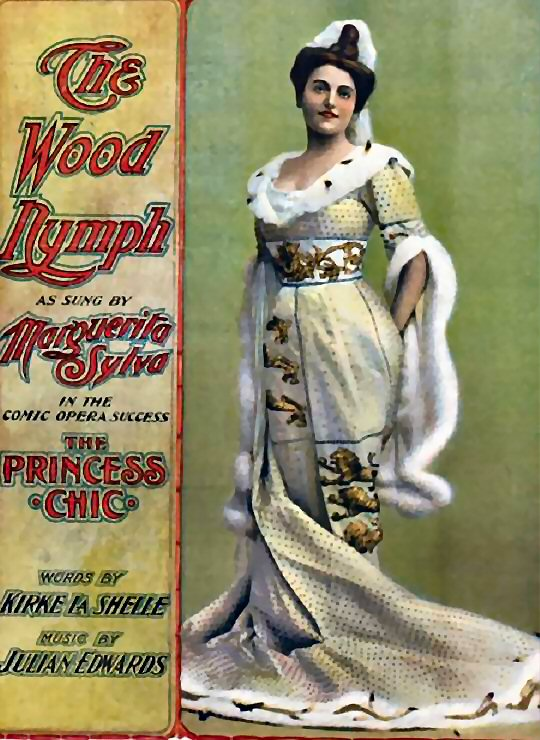
The Princess Chic sheet music featuring Marguerita Sylva, c. 1901

That same year La Shelle wrote the book and lyrics for The Princess Chic, a comic opera composed by Julian Edwards. The Princess Chic premiered on New Year's Day 1900 at the Lafayette Square Opera House in Washington D. C. with Minnie Methot in the title role. It then toured to the Columbia Theatre in Boston where it opened on January 16, 1900. During its Boston run, Christie MacDonald replaced Methot as Princess Chic due to a nagging injury in early February 1900. She continued to play the role for its Broadway premier at the Casino Theatre some three weeks later. After closing early in March 1900 The Princess Chic embarked on a road tour that, over the next several seasons, would see the Princess Chic of Normandy played by MacDonald, Marguerite Sylva, Maude Lillian Berrl and Vera Michelena.

In 1899 La Shelle produced the successful Augustus Thomas drama Arizona and, in 1901, The Bonnie Brier Bush, a drama adapted by playwright James MacArthur from the novel Beside the Bonnie Brier Bush by Ian Maclaren. With Rupert Hughes, Joseph W. Herbert, and Paul West he co-authored the book to the 1902 musical Tommy Rot. He produced Augustus Thomas' 1903 hit comedy The Earl of Pawtucket, and the following year he produced Checkers, a comedy by Henry Blossom.

La Shelle produced and shared the writing credits with Owen Wister on their successful 1903 stage adaptation of the author's popular novel The Virginian. In 1905 he produced The Education of Mr. Pipp, a comedy Augustus Thomas based on a series of drawings by Charles Dana Gibson and, what would prove to be his final project, The Heir to the Hoorah, a comedy by Paul Armstrong.

== Personal life ==
On June 15, 1893, La Shelle married, in Chicago, Mazie Elizabeth Nodine, an Illinois native. The couple had two children, Mazie Maria and Kirke, born between 1898 and 1901. In 1904 La Shelle's health began to decline and he was eventually diagnosed as diabetic. La Shelle suffered two accidents early in May 1905 while at his summer residence in Bellport, Long Island—a badly cut foot from a lawn mower and serious burns to his face while attempting to repair a hot water pipe. The stress from these events were thought to have aggravated the diabetes that led to his death on May 16, 1905.

La Shelle was laid to rest at a small cemetery near his summer home in Bellport. Serving as his pallbearers were Frank Vanderlip, theatre manager Harry Hamlin, artist Lawrence Mazzanovich, author Henry L. Wilson, Digby Bell, author Ray Brown, writer William Eugene Lewis and friend J. Louis White. Not long after her husband's death Mazie La Shelle, as president, and J. Louis White, as secretary, formed the Kirke La Shelle Co. to continue to produce and protect his intellectual properties. On June 8, 1908 she married the noted architect Richard Howland Hunt at Frank Vanderlip's country estate in Scarborough, New York.
