= Evelyn Campbell (actress) =

British-born American actress (1865–?)

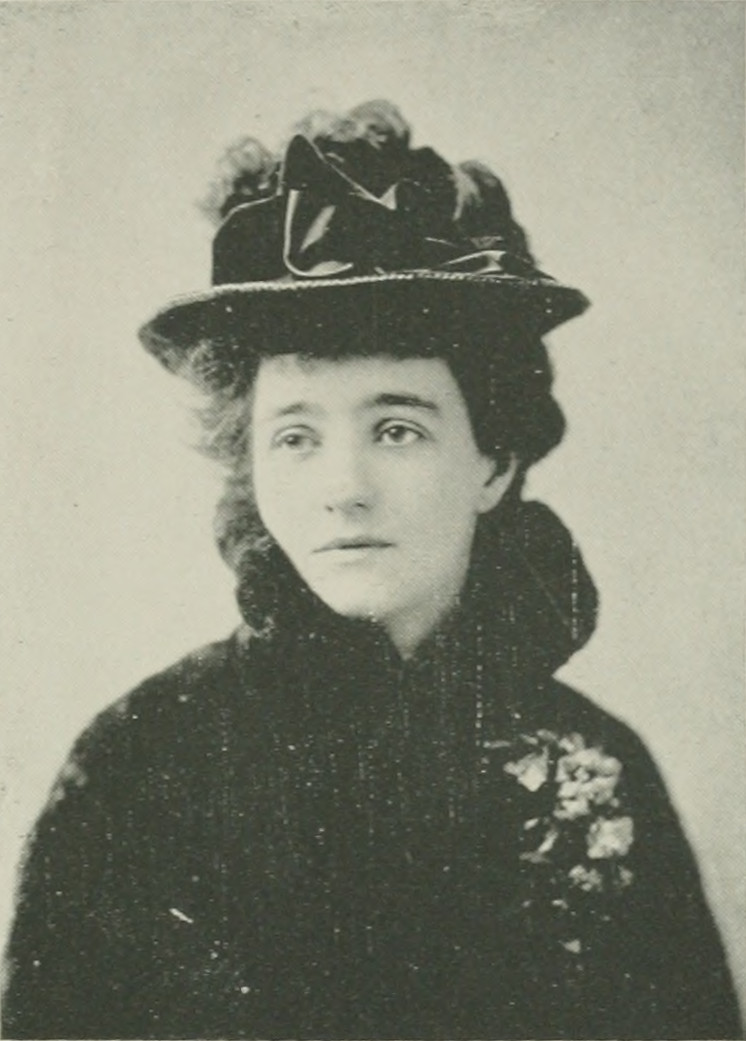
Evelyn Campbell, a Woman of the Century

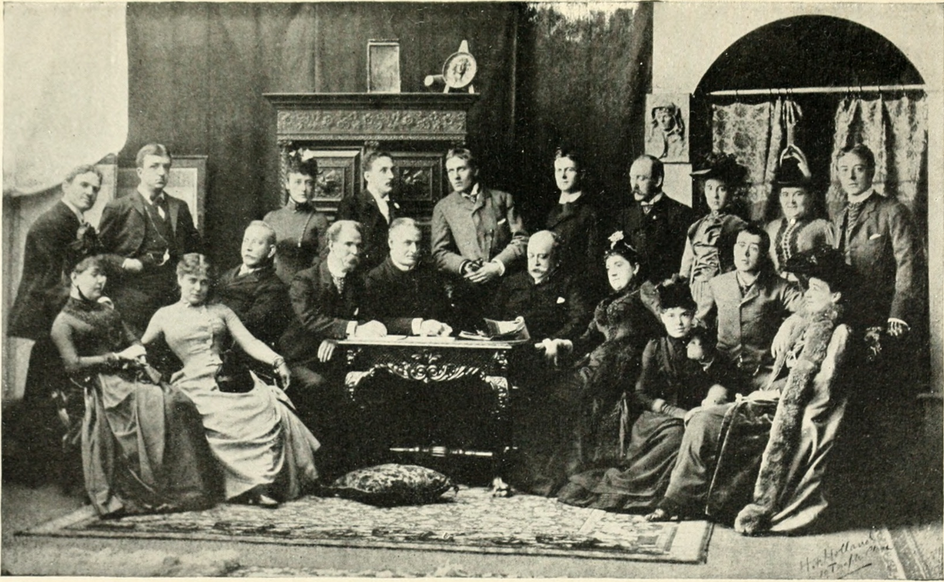
Evelyn Campbell (seated, far right) at the Boston Museum Stock Company, 1889-1890

Evelyn Campbell (1865 – ? ) was a British-born American actress.

== Biography ==
Evelyn Campbell was the stage name of Helen Petrie, born in Liverpool, England, in 1865. She was the daughter of Conrad and Helen Petrie. Coming to the United States when she was quite young, the family settled in New York City, where Campbell entered the Lyceum School for Dramatic Expression, under the charge of L. D. Sargent. She remained there three months.

After leaving the Lyceum School, Campbell was with a traveling company for two years. She was the leading Juvenile with Edwin Arden during the second year of her stage career. She then became a member of Palmer's company in Jim the Penman. She was a success in the character of the daughter and remained with that company two years. She then joined the Boston Museum Company, and was warmly received by its patrons. She was also associated with Hollis Street Theatre, Columbia Theater Company, and the Charles Frohman Company. Campbell earned a reputation for a conscientious and natural portrayal of the characters she represented. She was interested in all that pertained to her profession and won the commendation of the Boston critics.

Her mother died in Edinburgh in 1892. Campbell studied painting as a recreation. In her private life she was the close friend and confidante of Alice Muriel Williamson who in her autobiography "The Inky Way" reveals that Campbell, after retiring from the stage in 1894, began a liaison with author Samuel Rutherford Crockett with whom she cohabited in southern France during winter months from before 1900 until the latter's death in 1914—a liaison enabled by Crockett's need for warmer climes owing to his health. See Richard E. Rex, "Alice Muriel Williamson: The Secret History of an American-English Author" (Mill City Press, 1916), chapter "Alice Livingston."
