= The Honey Bee =

1920 silent film by George L. Cox

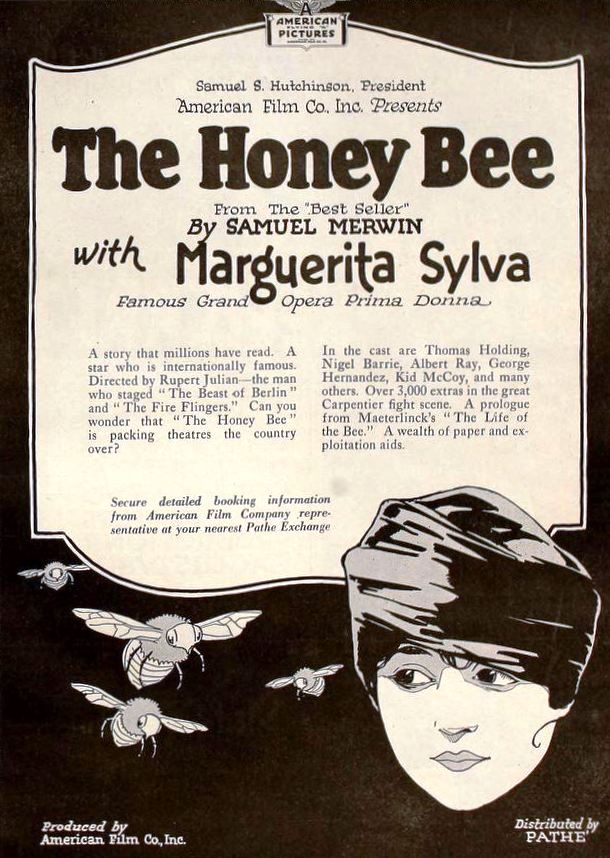
- Directed by: Rupert Julian
- Written by: Rupert Julian
- Starring: Marguerita Sylva; Thomas Holding; Nigel Barrie
- Cinematography: Jack MacKenzie
- Production company: American Film Company
- Distributed by: Pathé Exchange
- Release date: April 1920
- Country: United States
- Languages: Silent; English intertitles

The Honey Bee is a 1920 American silent drama film directed by Rupert Julian and starring Marguerita Sylva, Thomas Holding and Nigel Barrie.

== Cast ==
- Marguerita Sylva as Hilda Wilson
- Thomas Holding as Harris Doreyn
- Nigel Barrie as Blink Moran
- Albert Ray as Will Harper
- George Hernandez as Ed Johnson
- Harvey Clark as Dr. Jules Garceau
- Dell Boone as Mrs. Harris Doreyn
- Ethel Ullman as Adele Rainey
- Charlotte Merriam as Blondie
- Ruth Maurice as Juliette
- Harry Tenbrook as Apache
- Norman Selby as Carpentier

== Bibliography ==
- Goble, Alan. The Complete Index to Literary Sources in Film. Walter de Gruyter, 1999.
