= Stanislaus Stange =

American librettist and lyricist (1862–1917)

Stanislaus Stange (1862–1917) was a playwright, librettist, and lyricist who created many Broadway shows in the fin de siecle era and early 20th century. After minor success as an actor, Stange made his career as a writer in the musical theatre, moving towards more varied theatrical work before his death.

== Early career ==
Stanislaus Stange was born in Liverpool, England. He emigrated to America in 1881 and attempted to establish himself as an actor and elocution teacher, teaching the Delsarte technique of acting. One of his pupils was Alice Nielsen, for whom he later wrote shows. He worked with a drama club in Kansas City, Missouri, where he acted in and directed The Bells and Richard III. He later toured with George C. Milne, Stuart Robson and William H. Crane.

== Musical theatre ==
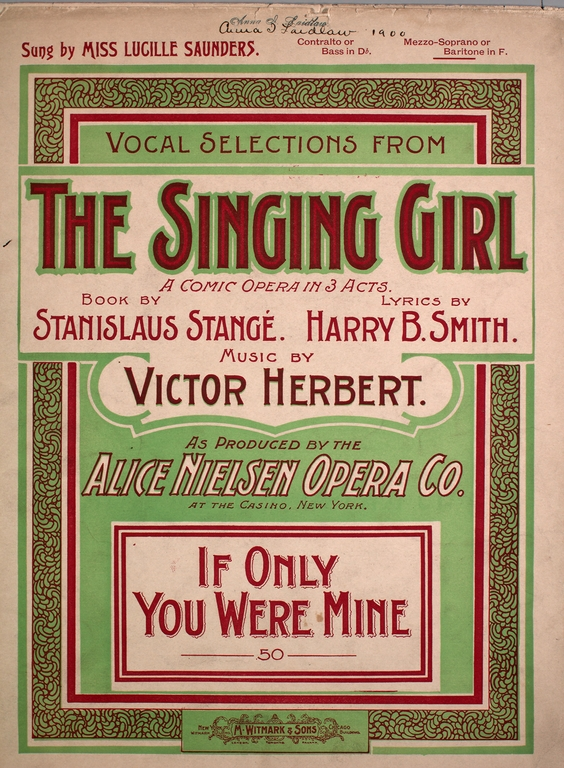
The score for Stange's musical The Singing Girl, music by Victor Herbert, lyrics by Harry B. Smith.

Stange moved to New York, where he had more success as a writer. He teamed up with composer Julian Edwards to create a string of musicals, beginning with Madeline, or the Magic Kiss (1895), a romantic fantasy in which an old man magically gets younger every time he is kissed. When he becomes a handsome young man again he meets the woman of his dreams, but is worried that her kiss will regress him to childhood. However, her "kiss of love" breaks the spell. The show was a big success.

With Edwards, Stange later created Brian Boru (1896), The Wedding Day (1897), The Jolly Musketeer (1898), and When Johnny Comes Marching Home (1902), which produced a popular patriotic song, "My Own United States".

Stange also worked with other composers, including Victor Herbert, for whom he wrote the book of the musical The Singing Girl, the plot of which borrows from Gilbert and Sullivan's The Mikado. This was a vehicle for Stange's old pupil Alice Nielsen.

In 1904, he wrote The Two Roses, with music by Ludwig Engländer. Louise Le Baron starred in the main role. The libretto was adapted from Oliver Goldsmith's She Stoops to Conquer. With the songwriting team of William Jerome and Jean Schwartz he created the 1904 musical Piff! Paff!! Pouf!!! which was a big hit for comedian Eddie Foy and was the longest running musical of the 1903-1904 Broadway season.

== Later work ==
Stange's biggest success was his play Quo Vadis? which was adapted from the novel of the same name by Henryk Sienkiewicz. This work premiered in Chicago at McVicker's Theater's in 1899, and was staged on Broadway and the West End in 1900. He also translated and adapted Oscar Straus's operetta, The Chocolate Soldier (1909), which he also directed. This achieved the longest run of all his works.

In 1910 Stange's play The Girl with the Whooping Cough caused controversy because of its allegedly salacious content. After intervention from the mayor of New York all performances on Broadway were stopped. Drama critic George Jean Nathan called the play "nauseating and ... disgusting in its futile efforts to be risqué".

In 1912 Stange suffered a stroke when working on a production of The Chocolate Soldier. His health and productivity declined from that point. He died at the age of 54 on January 2, 1917. His son, Hugh Stanislaus Stange, was also a successful playwright and screenwriter.
