= Christie MacDonald =

American actress

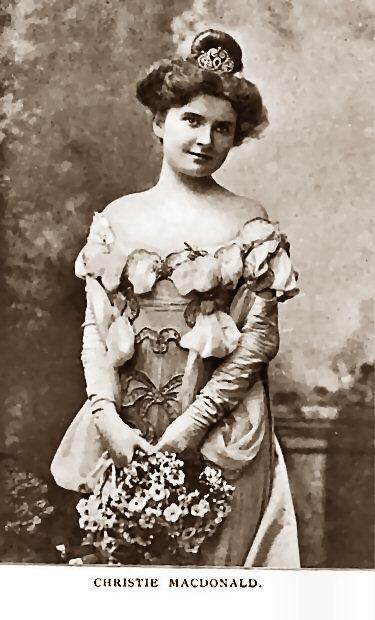
- Photograph from Famous Prima Donnas, 1900
- Born: February 28, 1875; Pictou, Nova Scotia
- Died: July 25, 1962 (aged 87); Fairfield, Connecticut
- Occupations: actress singer
- Years active: 1892-1920
- Spouses: William Jefferson; Henry Lloyd Gillespie

Christie MacDonald (February 28, 1875 – July 25, 1962) was a Canadian-born American musical comedy actress and opera singer. She was perhaps best remembered as the Princess of Bozena in the 1910 operetta Spring Maid. The 1913 musical Sweethearts specifically was written for MacDonald by composer Victor Herbert. She retired from the stage after appearing in a 1920 revival of the musical comedy Florodora.

== Early life ==
MacDonald was born in Pictou, Nova Scotia, the daughter of John MacClean MacDonald, a shipbuilder, mariner and inn-keeper in the coastal town of Pictou and Jessie (née MacKenzie). When she was about nine her family relocated to Boston, Massachusetts where she attended Bowdoin and later Boston High School.

== Career ==
MacDonald began her career performing in small roles in Boston; after which she became a member of Pauline Hall's theatre troupe in 1892. In 1893 she went to New York when she was cast in a small part in The Lion Tamer which was being mounted by Francis Wilson and his theatre troupe. The following season she was given the small part of Marie in the comic opera Erminie within Wilson's company; ultimately taking over the more substantial role of Javotte when Lulu Glaser withdrew due to illness.

With Wilson's company in the 1894-1895 season, MacDonald had success in the secondary role of Mrs. Griggs (a.k.a. Dolly) in Gilbert and Sullivan's The Chieftain. That same season she portrayed the valet Bob in the premiere of the operetta The Devil's Deputy. This operetta was created by an unknown composer. It was originally supposed to use a score by John Philip Sousa, but this course was abandoned after Wilson refused to pay the fee Sousa demanded for his music.

MacDonald's first starring role came in 1900 when she assumed the title role in the Kirke La Shelle and Julian Edwards comic opera The Princess Chic which also starred Melville Collins as Louis XI. MacDonald starred or co-starred in The Belle of Mayfair (1906) with Valeska Suratt, Miss Hook of Holland (1908) with Bertram Wallis and The Mikado (1910) with Fritzi Scheff. In 1910 she starred in one of her best-known musicals, The Spring Maid by Heinrich Reinhardt. Victor Herbert's Sweethearts (1913) was written especially for her.

MacDonald made several gramophone records before retiring in 1920. She was married first to William W. Jefferson, a son of the famous actor Joseph Jefferson, in 1901 and ended in divorce several years thereafter. In 1903 she conceived a child with prominent theatrical promoter and New York State Senator Timothy Sullivan, who was soon placed in the New York Foundling Hospital. MacDonald did not return to the stage until 1904.

In 1911 MacDonald married Henry L. Gillespie, the scion of a wealthy Pittsburgh contracting family and had one daughter, Christie. As of 1950 MacDonald was living with her daughter and grandchildren in Westport, Connecticut. Christie MacDonald died in Fairfield, Connecticut on July 25, 1962.

== Selected musicals ==
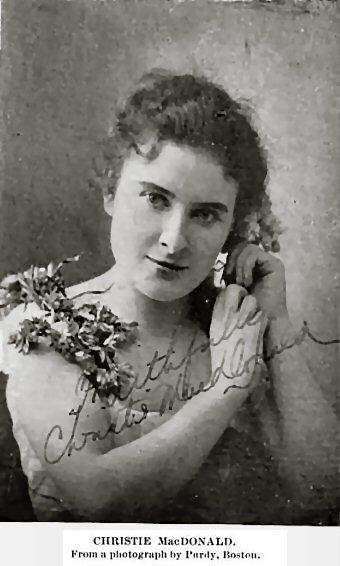
Christie MacDonald, The Opera Glass, 1898

- Erminie (1893)
- The Bride Elect (1898)
- The Man in the Moon (1899)
- The Toreador (1902)
- The Sho-Gun (1904)
- The Belle of Mayfair (1906)
- Miss Hook of Holland (1908)
- The Spring Maid (1910)
- The Mikado (1910) (revival)
- Sweethearts (1913)
- Florodora (1920) (revival)
