= The Rose of Algeria =

Musical by Victor Herbert

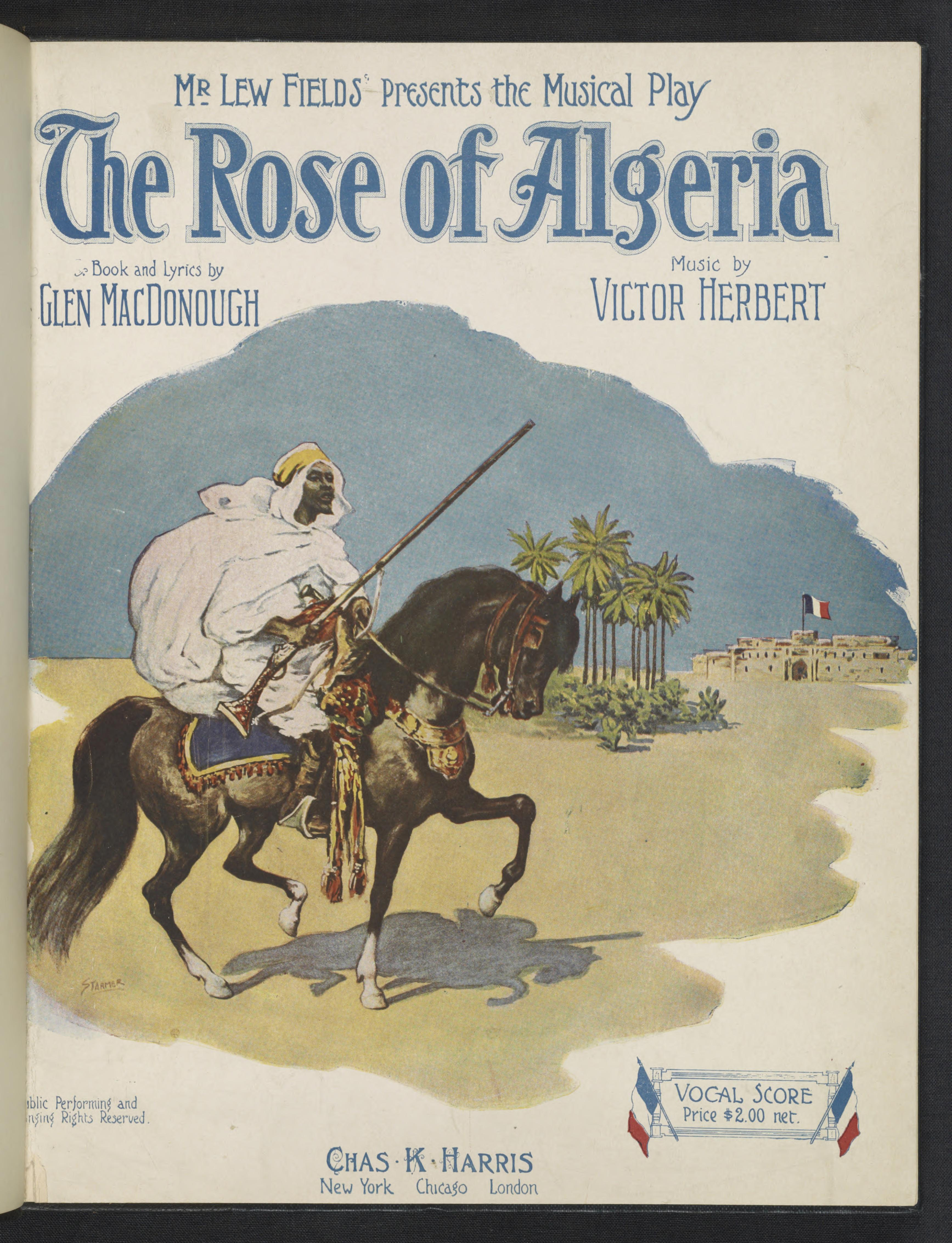
Vocal score of the operetta The Rose of Algeria

The Rose of Algeria is a musical in two acts with music by Victor Herbert and both book and lyrics by Glen McDonough. The work features two songs which have become a part of the classical canon of concert repertoire, "Rose of the World" and "Twilight of Barakeesh". The work is set in the country of Algeria at an oasis in the Sahara desert and at a palace in the nation's capital, Algiers. First staged on Broadway under the title Algeria in 1908, the work was a critical failure in its original version. Believing the work was a strong one, Herbert made numerous revisions after the original Broadway production closed. The revised version, now titled The Rose of Algeria, was mounted at Broadway's Herald Square Theatre in 1909 with a completely different cast and a new director. This second version was more successful with critics and audiences.
