= Jefferson De Angelis =

American actor

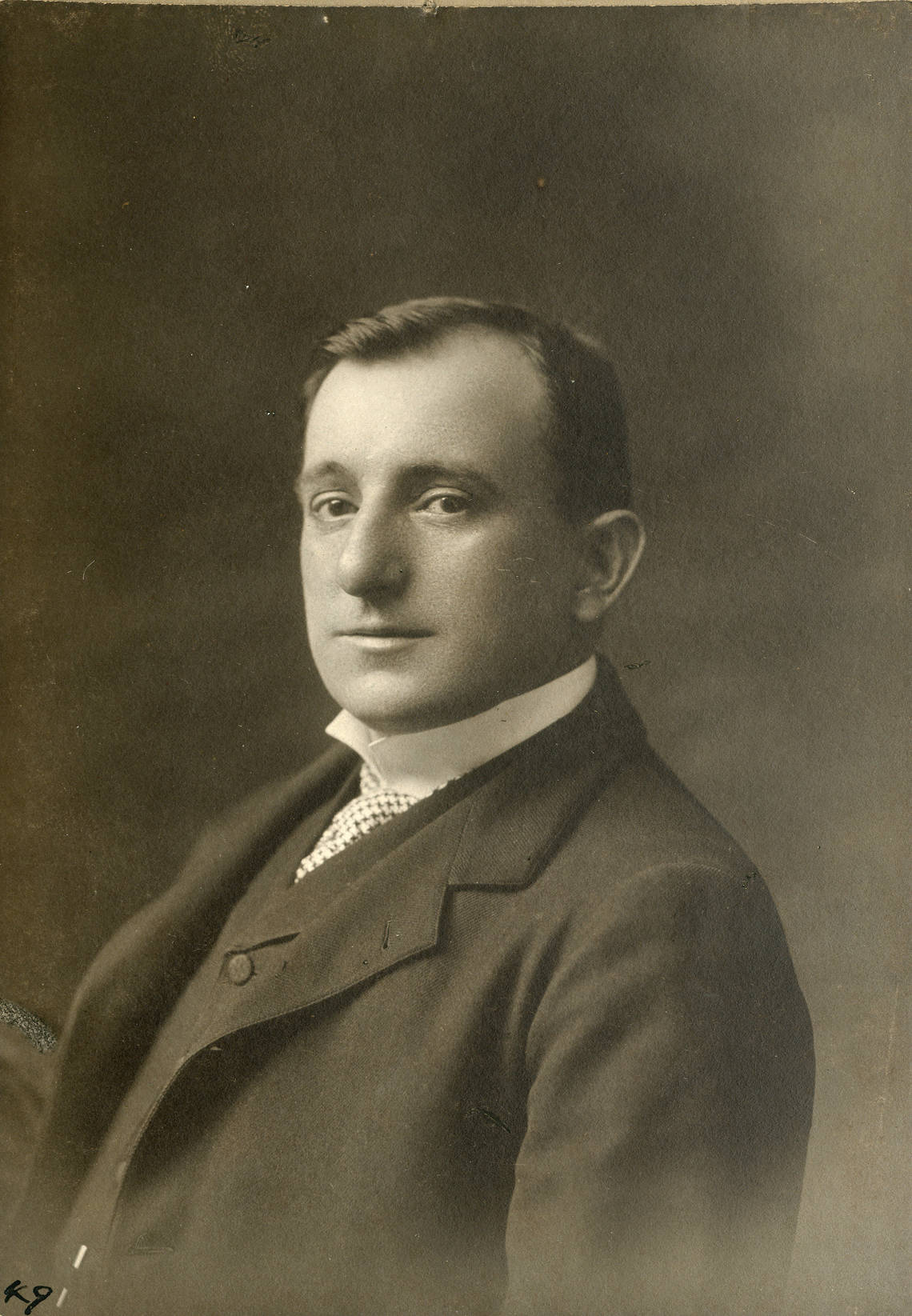
- Born: Thomas Jefferson De Angelis; November 30, 1859; San Francisco, California
- Died: March 20, 1933 (aged 73); Orange, New Jersey, Essex County
- Other name: "Jeff"
- Occupation: actor
- Years active: 1870-1930
- Spouses: Florence Conliffe; Charlotte Elliott

Thomas Jefferson De Angelis (November 30, 1859 – March 20, 1933), born in San Francisco was an American century stage actor who specialized in comedy and acrobatic clowning and who achieved fame in vaudeville and on Broadway. He was also a stage director and producer. He began in Baltimore at age 10. Near the end of his life, he appeared in the hit 1927 Broadway play The Royal Family by Edna Ferber. He sporadically appeared in silent films, mostly shorts. He wrote his 1931 autobiography, A Vagabond Trouper, with Alvin E. Harlow.

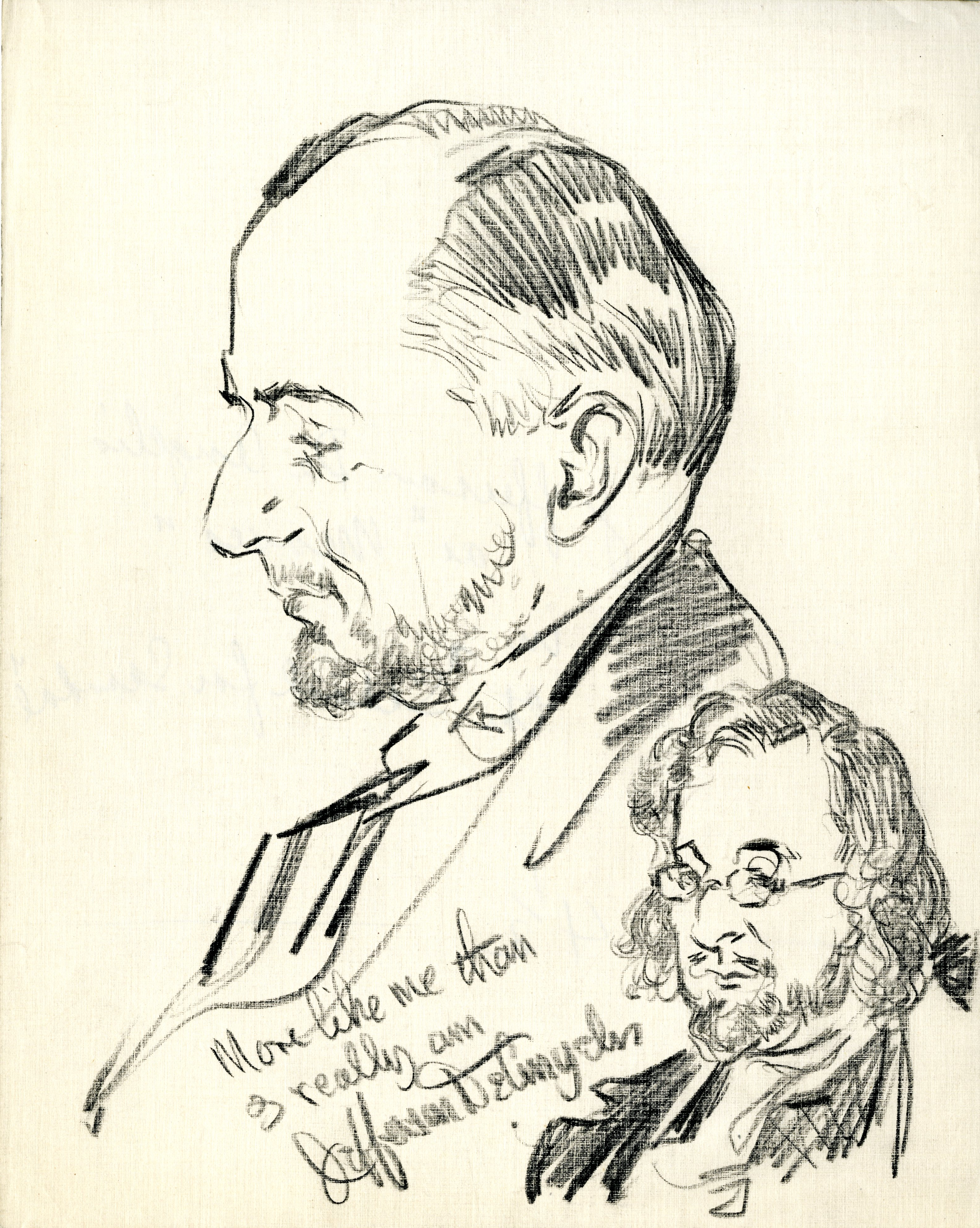
Jefferson DeAngelis autographed drawing by Manuel Rosenberg December 25, 1925 for the Cincinnati Post

== Gallery ==
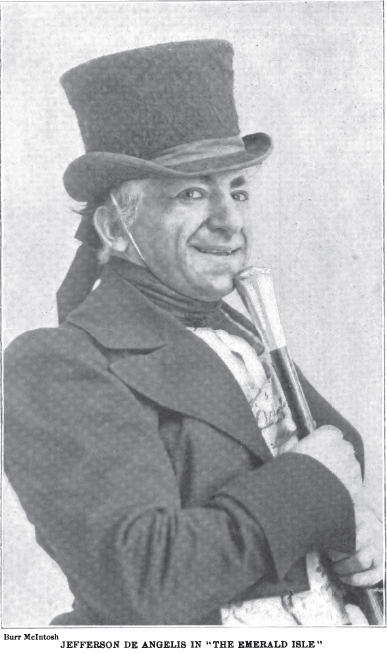
Jefferson De Angelis in The Emerald Isle - 1902

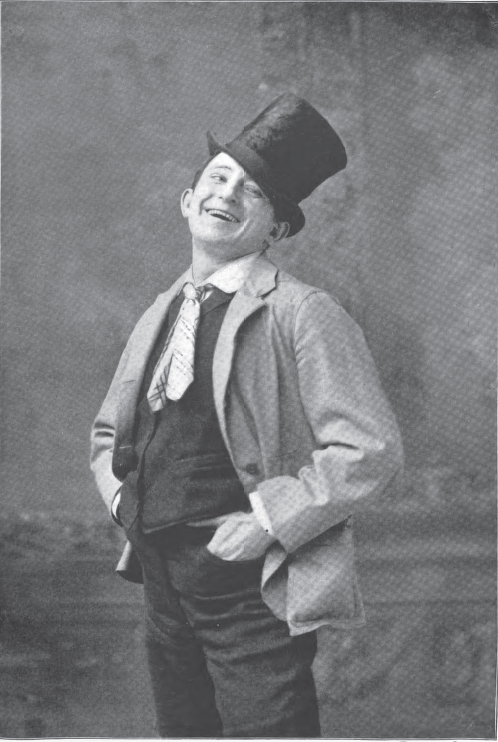
Jefferson de Angelis in an unknown role

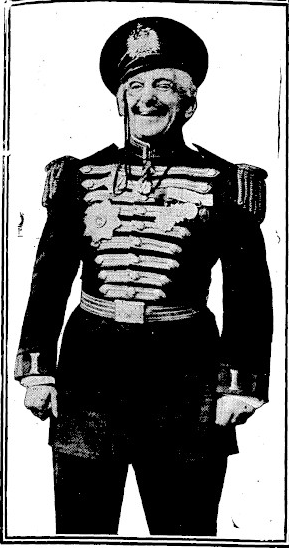
Jefferson De Angelis as General Samovar in The Beauty Spot 1909.
