= Columbia Theatre (Boston) =

Theatre in Boston, Massachusetts, US

Coordinates: 42°20′47.26″N 71°3′52.61″W

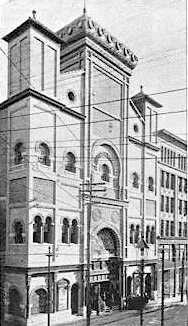
Columbia Theatre, Washington Street, Boston, 1892

The Columbia Theatre (1891 – c. 1957) or Loew's New Columbia Theatre in Boston, Massachusetts, was a playhouse and cinema located in the South End at No. 978 Washington Street. Charles Frohman, Isaac Baker Rich and William Harris ("Rich & Harris and Charles Frohman") oversaw the theatre until 1895. Owners included J.J. Grace of New York and Loews. Staff included Harry Farren, Saul Hamilburg and Philip Shea. The Columbia existed until its demolition in 1957.

== Performances ==
- 1492 Up to Date, with Rice's "Surprise Party"
- Nat C. Goodwin, comedian
- Herbert Graham's "His Wedding Day"
- Brandon Thomas' Charley's Aunt
- Hagenbeck's trained animals
- Sydney Grundy's "Sowing the Wind"
- "The Belle of New York"

== Notable people ==
- Evelyn Campbell

== Images ==
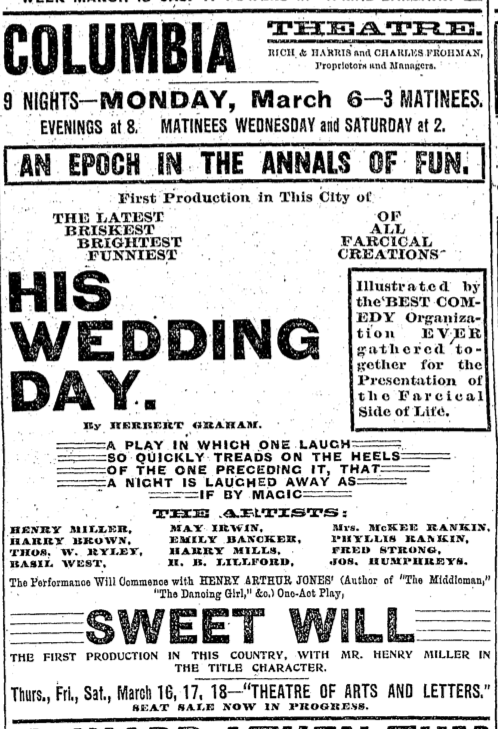
Advertisement for "His Wedding Day," 1893

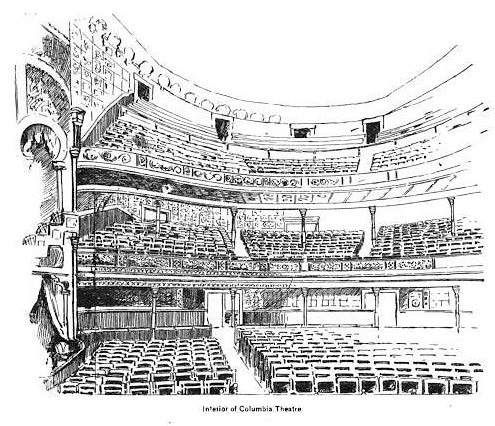
Interior, 1896

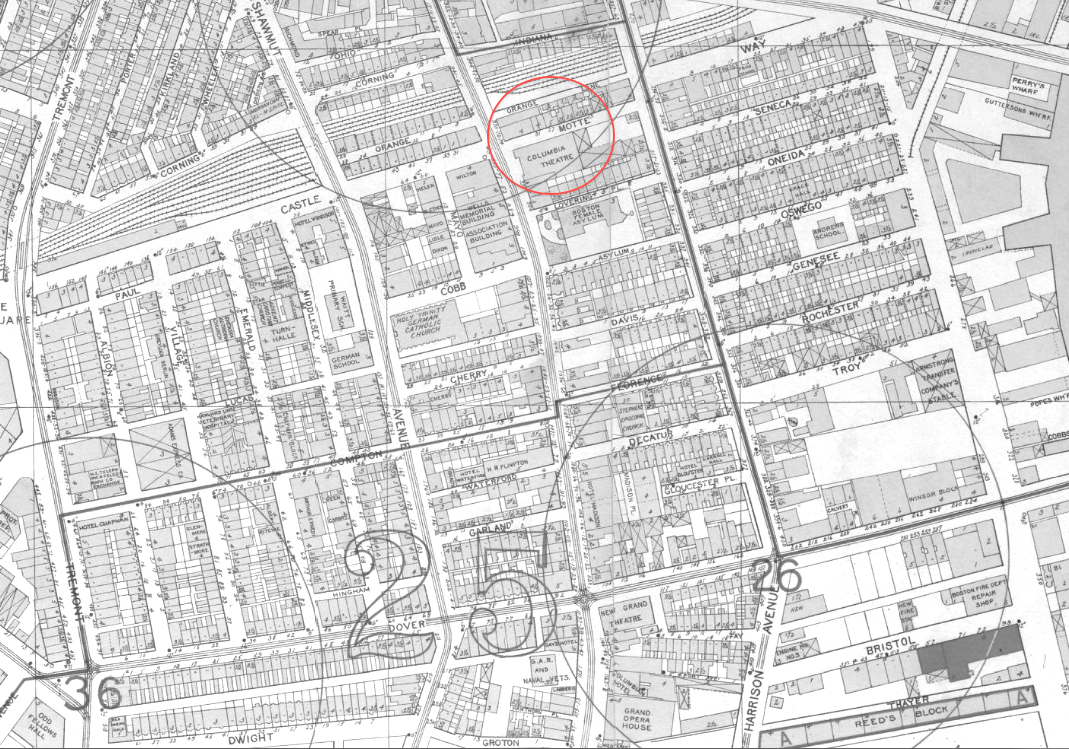
Detail of 1896 map of Boston, showing location of Columbia Theatre

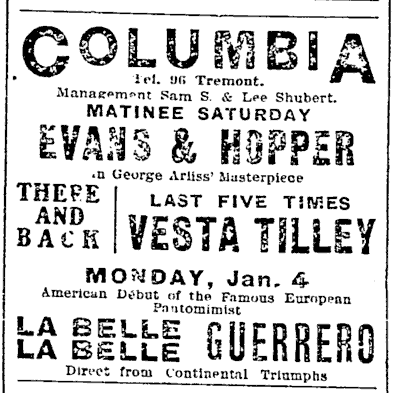
Advertisement for Evans & Hopper, 1903

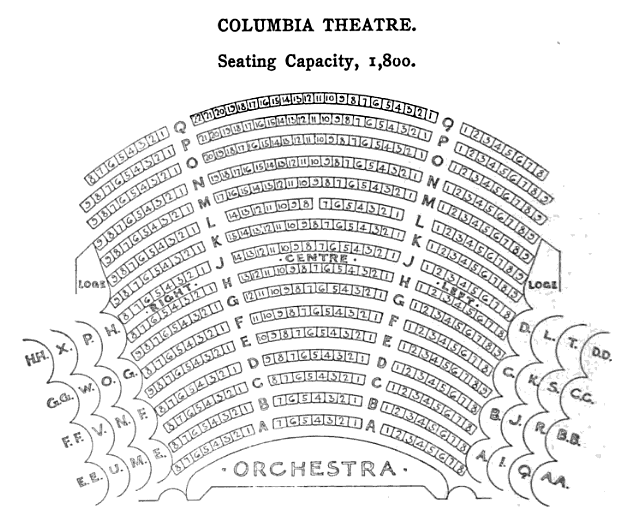
Seating plan, 1904
