= Julian Edwards =

English composer (1855–1910)

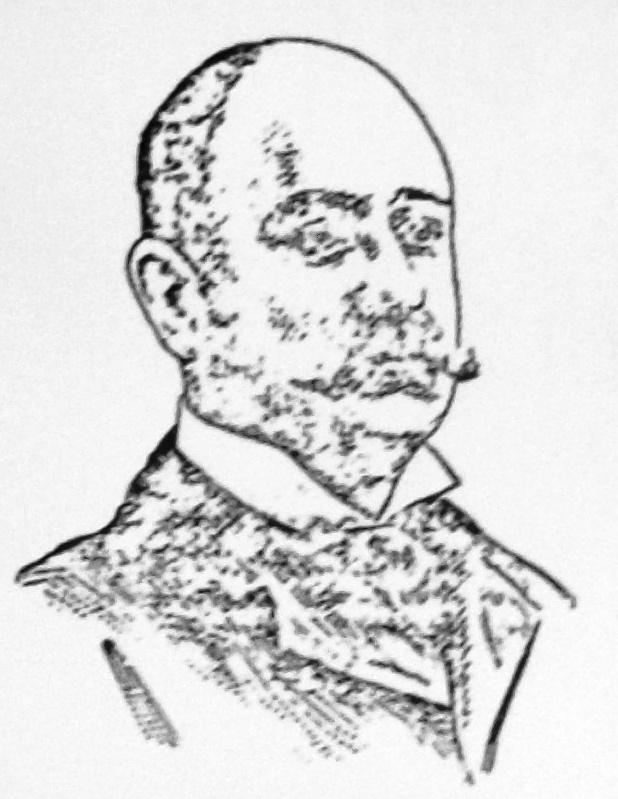
Julian Edwards in 1896

Julian Edwards (December 11, 1855 - September 5, 1910) was an English composer of light operatic music, who composed many successful Broadway shows in the Progressive Era. He attempted to introduce new levels of musical sophistication to the genre. Some of his songs achieved popularity at the time.

== Early life ==
Edwards was born in Manchester, England, and studied in Edinburgh and London. He became conductor of the Carl Rosa Opera Company. He also conducted at the Royal English Opera House, where he met his wife, prima donna Philippine Siedle. He composed a grand opera entitled Victorian, first performed at the Theatre Royal, Sheffield on 6 April 1883, which was also performed at Covent Garden Opera House on 19 January 1884. The libretto, by J F Reynolds-Anderson, was based on Henry Wadsworth Longfellow's play The Spanish Student.

== Broadway career ==
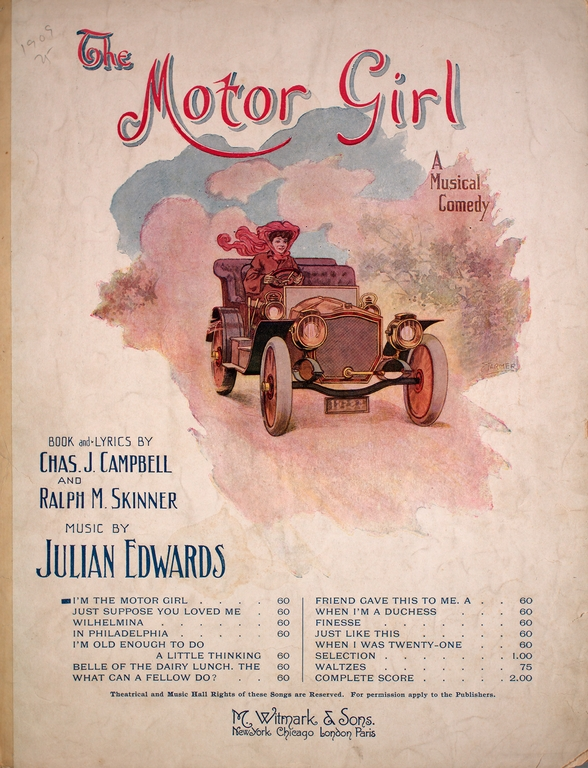
Score for Edwards' musical comedy The Motor Girl.

He soon turned his attention to lighter music, moving to New York at the invitation of Broadway producer James C. Duff, and creating a number of Broadway shows, beginning with Jupiter (1892), to a libretto by Harry B. Smith. He followed it with 17 more musicals.

His first big success was Madeleine, or the Magic Kiss (1893). This was his first collaboration with playwright and lyricist Stanislaus Stange, with whom he worked on several other projects. They later had an even greater success with Brian Boru (1896), a "Romantic Irish Opera" based on the life of the medieval Irish king. One of their critically successful operas was The Wedding Day which premiered for the grand opening of the newly renovated Wieting Opera House on September 15, 1896 before eventually running on Broadway at the Casino Theatre in 1897.

Among his many other works, he also wrote Jolly Musketeer (1898), The Princess Chic (1900), Dolly Varden (1902), When Johnny Comes Marching Home (1902), Love's Lottery (1904), The Gay Musician (1908, with book and lyrics by Chas. J. Campbell and Edward Siedle, his brother-in-law), The Motor Girl (1909) and The Girl and the Wizard (1909). Love's Lottery was intended as a vehicle for the German opera singer Ernestine Schumann-Heink, who withdrew after fifty performances.

Some of Edwards' songs with lyricist Stanislaus Stange were published as independent pieces. Their patriotic song My Own United States from When Johnny Comes Marching Home, achieved particular popularity. Among the stars of the era who performed his work were Lillian Russell, Jefferson De Angelis, Della Fox, Christie MacDonald, and Lulu Glaser.

== Other works ==
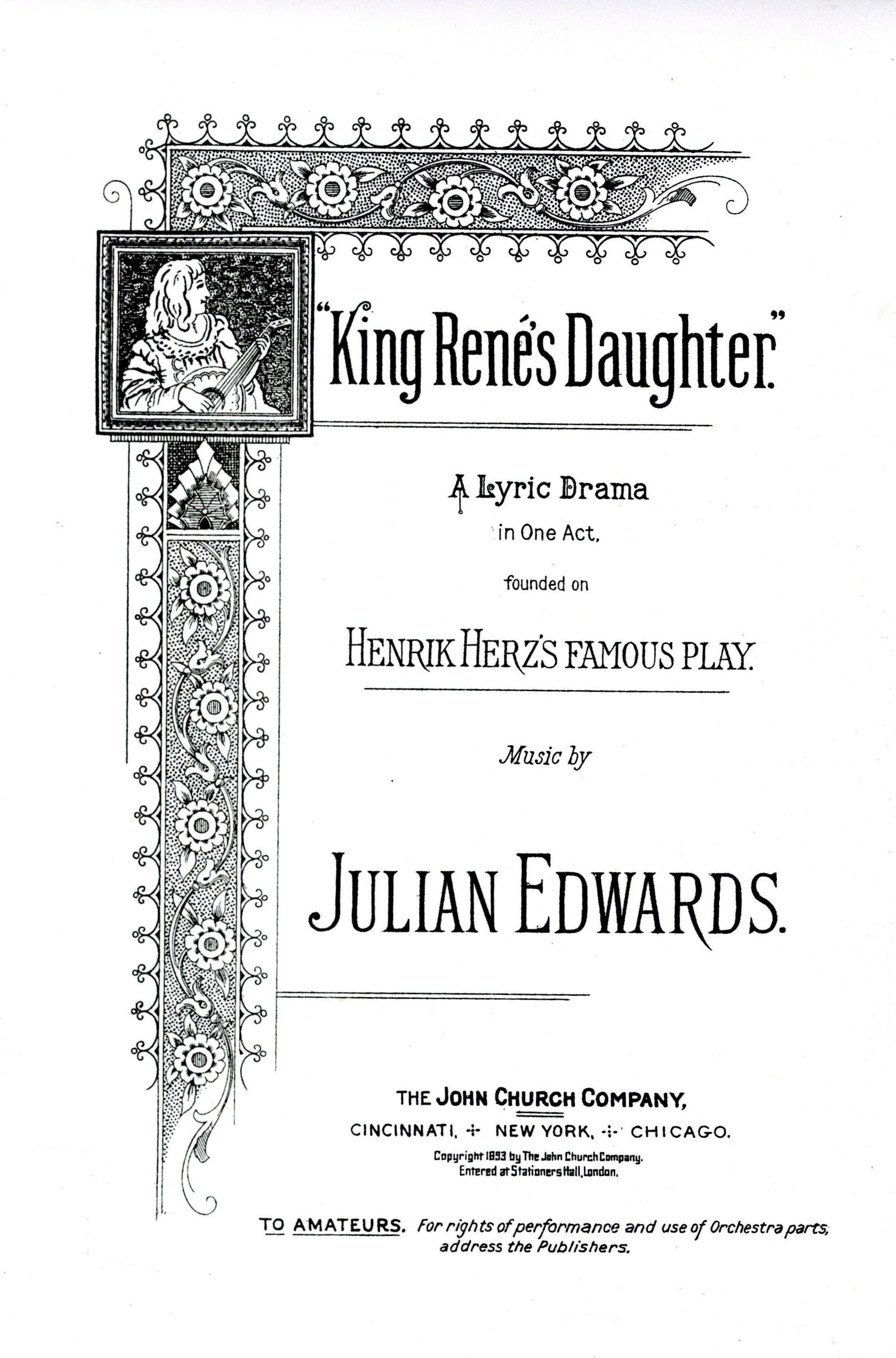
The published score of King René's Daughter

While writing his Broadway shows, Edwards continued to work on more serious pieces. He made his name in America with an operatic adaptation of the play King René's Daughter (1893), presented as a one-act lyrical drama. Edwards wrote the libretto himself, from an existing English translation. The opera was criticised on the grounds that his music "wallows in Wagner". Edwards had intended to submit it for the Sonzogno prize for one-act operas, but it was completed too late. The work had only limited success.

He also composed The Patriot (1907), another one-act grand opera, to a libretto by Stange, set in the American War of Independence. He completed two more grand operas, Elfinella and Corinne, but these were unproduced. He was particularly proud of his sacred cantatas, including The Redeemer and Lazarus. His oratorio Mary Magdalene was not fully completed before his death. In 1907 he set a translation of P. D. A. Atterbom's poem The Mermaid.

He wrote incidental music for productions of many plays, including Quo Vadis, In the Palace of the King, Gringoire, The Wooing of Priscilla, King Robert of Sicily, The Cipher Code, In a Balcony, The Land of Heart's Desire and others.

He also published collections of songs, including "Sunlight and Shadow", and copyists' full scores of two symphonies, in E major and A minor, exist in the Tams-Witmark collection at the Library of Congress.

== Views on music and songwriting ==
When interviewed in 1908 Edwards was asked about the proper relationship between a composer and a lyricist. He took the view that there is no single model but stated that "to my mind the ideal collaboration between the musician and the librettist is that of Gilbert & Sullivan. They stand alone." He especially praised Gilbert's libretti, and described Sullivan's music as "clever". He dismissed his own work in light music, emphasising his serious works, particularly his operas and cantatas. Initially, an opponent of Wagnerism, Edwards had become a strong supporter of the movement. He believed that Richard Strauss's Salome (1905) was the most important work of recent modern music.

Edwards died of heart failure in 1910. He is described as a "serious, but poorly endowed" composer by theatre historian Gerald Bordman, but Bordman's comments on Edwards concern only his operettas.
