= Frank Lawton (vaudevillian) =

American actor (died 1914)

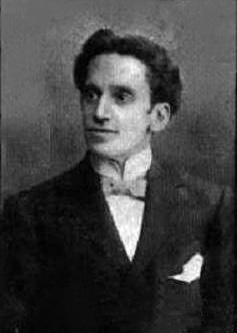
Frank Lawton

Frank Lawton (died 1914) was an American vaudevillian entertainer whose popularity extended far beyond his country's borders.

== Early life ==
Like so many 19th- and early 20th-century actors who made their living traveling from town to town often under assumed stage names, Frank Lawton's past is difficult to trace. What evidence does exist indicates he was an American born in the late 1850s, probably at Hartford, Connecticut. Some sources state his birth name was Frank Mokeley, a claim that seems to date back to a 1933 New York Times article about his son, film actor Frank Lawton. This may be true, though it has proven difficult to locate any public record or contemporary newspaper article that supports this assertion. In later editions of Who's Who in the Theatre, his full name is listed as Frank Mokeley Lawton.

== Career ==
Lawton's professional debut was in 1874 with the Eureka Minstrels as one half of a song and dance duo with Lew Dockstader. He would go on to team up at one time or another with players Joe Sparks, Billy Mitchell and others before joining in the early 1880s Charles Hale Hoyt's Hole in the Ground and Milk White Flag companies. He later received praise for his role as Spartacus Hubbs in the 1887 Cal Wallace play Pa with the Sol Smith Russell Company. By then Lawton had refined his talents as a singer, dance comedian, bones player and amazing siffleur. The latter talent would one day earn him the title, bestowed by at least one British critic, Champion Whistler of the World. In 1898 Lawton's whistling act was recorded by Fred Gaisberg, one of over a thousand sides of recordings Gaisberg made for Berliner Gramophone and later Gramophone Company of artist working in London. Lawton would spend the greater part of the last twenty-five years of his life touring New Zealand, Australia and Great Britain where he was well received. After a successful run playing Blinky Bill in the musical comedy The Belle of New York with actress Edna May, Lawton chose to stay in London after his company returned to New York in 1899. Frank Lawton died there on April 16, 1914, after a long illness and the collapse of a spectacular production planned for London's Earl's Court had left him in financial ruin. A few weeks later the London theatre district put on a benefit show to raise money for his widow, former dancer Daisy May Collier, and their four children.

Lawton's first known marriage in 1894 to actress Virginia Earle ended in divorce eight years later.
