= Wheel of Fate =

Wheel of Fate may refer to:

- Wheel of Fate (Ferris wheel), at the Enchanted Kingdom theme park in Santa Rosa, Laguna, Philippines
- Wheel of Fate (film), a 1953 British drama
