= My Husband and I =

My Husband and I may refer to:

- My Husband and I (1956 TV series), British sitcom starring Evelyn Laye and Frank Lawton
- My Husband and I (1987 TV series), British sitcom starring Mollie Sugden and William Moore
