= Emily Bancker =

American actress

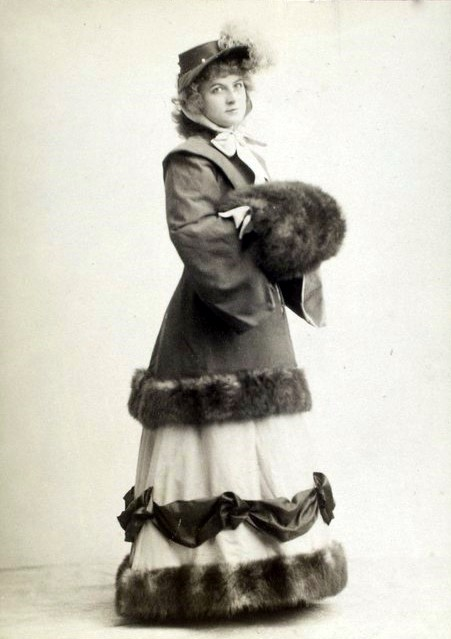
Emily Bancker c. 1882–97 New York Public Library Digital Gallery

Emily Bancker (1861/62 – June 5, 1897) was an American stage actress active on the North American stage over the balance of the 1880s and '90s. Sources disagree regarding her origins, with contemporary newsprint articles divided on whether she was English or American.

== Career ==
By 1882 she was playing a juvenile role with comedian Gus Williams in the comedy One of the Finest and two years later in Le Pave de Paris. Bancker next joined the Sol Smith Russell Company where she played Sybil in the Cal Wallace 1887 farce Pa. Bancker appeared in the 1888 Hanlon Brothers’ production of Voyage en Suisse, where she met her future husband, actor Thomas W. Ryley. She was a member of Rosina Vokes’s company that opened at Daly’s Theatre on April 13, 1891, in productions of A Game of Cards, Wig and Gown, and The Rough Diamond. and on May 1, 1891, as Lucy Preston in Grundy's The Silver Shield. Later in the year Bancker joined Charles Frohman's comedy company playing one of the two widows (the other Georgiana Drew) in the Bisson-Carre-Gillette farce, Mr. Wilkinson's Widows. Afterward she performed roles in such plays as The Junior Partner, His Wedding Day, and Gloriana.

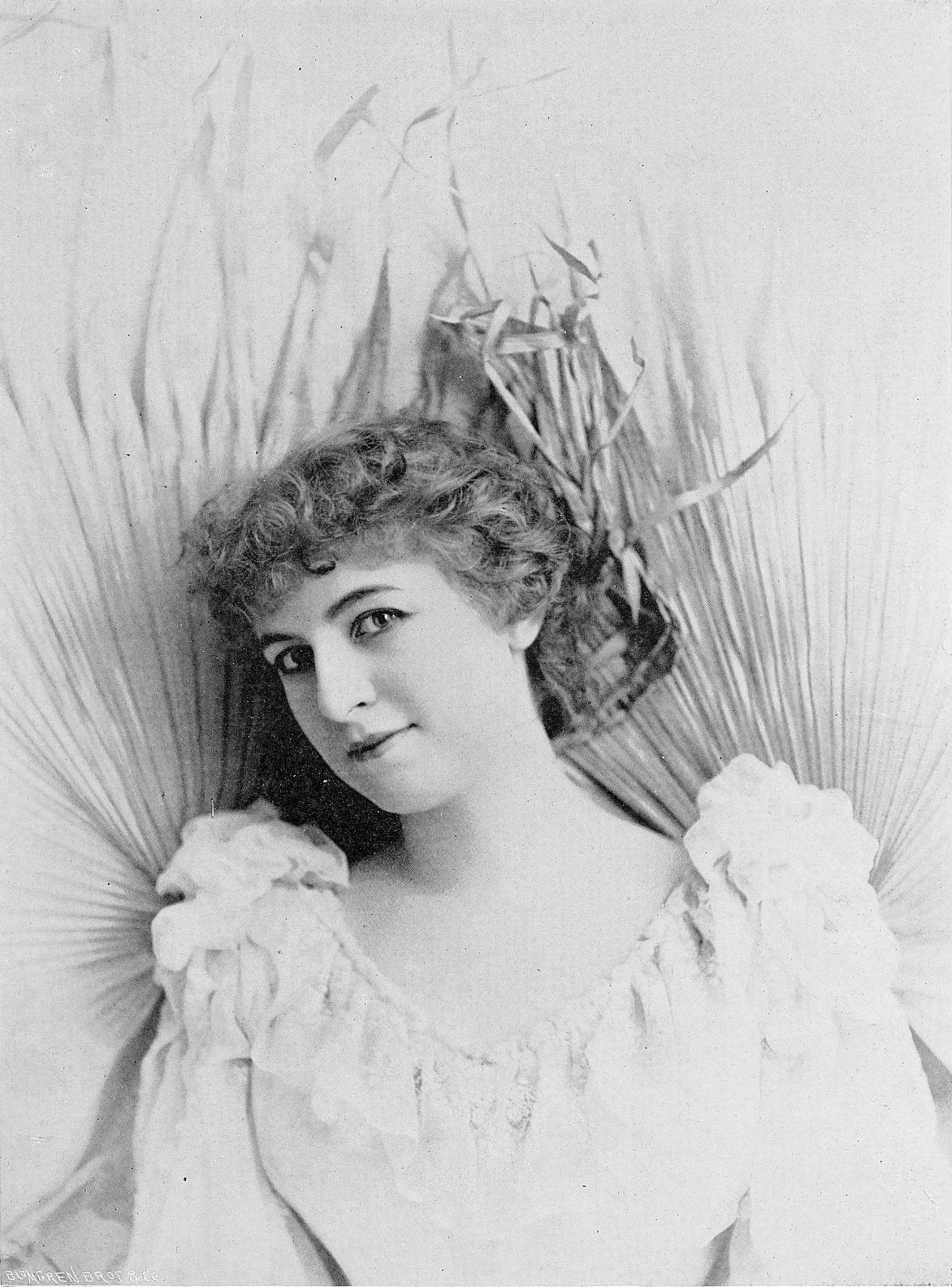
Emily Bancker, c. 1891

Bancker’s final appearance in New York City was in the play Our Flat, staged at the Murray Hill Theatre on April 3, 1897. She had over the mid-1890s achieved great success touring North America with own company in Mrs. Musgrove’s farce-comedy Our Flat, originally produced in 1889 in London and New York.

== Death ==
A few days later Emily Bancker fell ill while visiting an aunt in Albany, N.Y., and as her condition worsened she was rushed to the local hospital, where she died on June 5, 1897, after a failed operation. The cause of death was reportedly the result of complications from peritonitis. Her husband, by then also her business manager, was at her bedside when she died. Thomas W. Ryley went on to have a long career as a manager and Broadway producer. Prior to her illness Bancker had been touring Upstate New York in the play A Divorce Cure by Victorien Sardou. Emily Bancker’s many obituaries have her either born in New York or coming to America from England with Rosina Vokes’ company. Most publications agreed that she was in her mid-thirties at the time of her death.
