= Poor Schmaltz =

1915 film by Hugh Ford

- Directed by: Hugh Ford
- Screenplay by: Mark Swan
- Starring: Sam Bernard; Robert Broderick; Conway Tearle; Dick Bernard; Ruby Hoffman; Leonore Thompson
- Production company: Famous Players Film Company
- Distributed by: Paramount Pictures
- Release date: August 23, 1915
- Country: United States
- Language: English

Poor Schmaltz is a lost 1915 American comedy silent film directed by Hugh Ford and written by Mark Swan. The film stars Sam Bernard, Robert Broderick, Conway Tearle, Dick Bernard, Ruby Hoffman and Leonore Thompson. The film was released on August 23, 1915, by Paramount Pictures.

== Cast ==
- Sam Bernard as Herman Schmaltz
- Robert Broderick as Mr. Hocheimer
- Conway Tearle as Jack
- Dick Bernard as Count Hugo Victor von Mimmeldorf
- Ruby Hoffman as Anne, Queen of the Reds
- Leonore Thompson as Louise Hocheimer
