= In Gay New York =

In Gay New York is a musical revue with a script and lyrics by C. M. S. McLellan, under his pseudonym Hugh Morton, and music by Gustave Kerker. The story revolves around two newlyweds from Maine who come to New York City, do some sightseeing, and see bits from the 1895–96 season at the Casino satirized in vaudevillian action.

The revue premiered on Broadway at the Casino Theatre on May 25, 1896 and closed in mid-August. Virginia Earle had the starring role but left the production because of throat problems. She was replaced by Catherine Linyard. Walter Jones was the male lead, while the production featured an early appearance by Madge Lessing. The Pittsburgh Press called it the best revue that Canary & Lederer had produced at the Casino, saying it was well staged and "as gay as anyone could desire".
