= Sam Bernard =

British actor

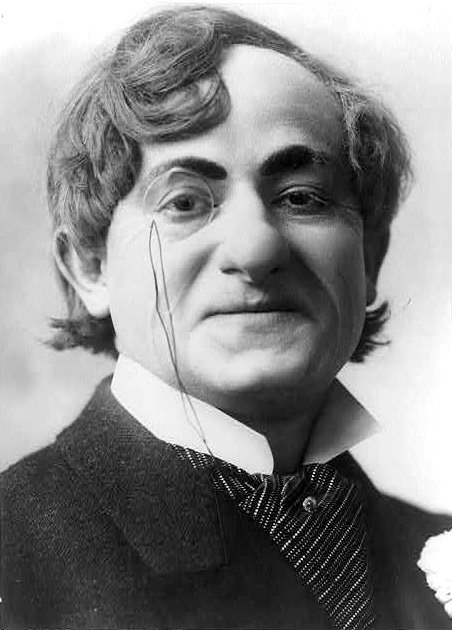
- As Herman Schultz in The Girl and the Wizard (1909); Photo Library of Congress
- Born: Samuel Barnett; 5 June 1863; Birmingham, England
- Died: 16 May 1927 (aged 63); Aboard ship on Atlantic Ocean
- Years active: Late 1870s–1927
- Spouses: Lizzie Reardon (1894–?); Florence Deutsch (1902–1927, his death)

Sam Bernard (born Samuel Barnett, 5 June 1863 – 16 May 1927) was an English-born American vaudeville comedian who also performed in musical theatre, comic opera and burlesque and appeared in a few silent films.

== Life and career ==
Bernard was born in Birmingham, England, and moved to the United States as a child. He began performing a song and dance act with his brother Dick in variety houses in Manhattan, changing their stage name from Barnett as they considered the name Bernard more "ethnic". Sam went solo in 1884, and joined B. F. Keith's theatre company in Providence, Rhode Island. After a brief tour in England, he returned to the U.S., performed in the Night Owls comedy troupe, and then became the part-owner and leading comedy actor in the French Folly Company. He was friendly with Joe Weber and Lew Fields, and in 1890 agreed to manage their troupes, the Russell Brothers Comedians and then the Vaudeville Club touring company, in which Bernard also starred.

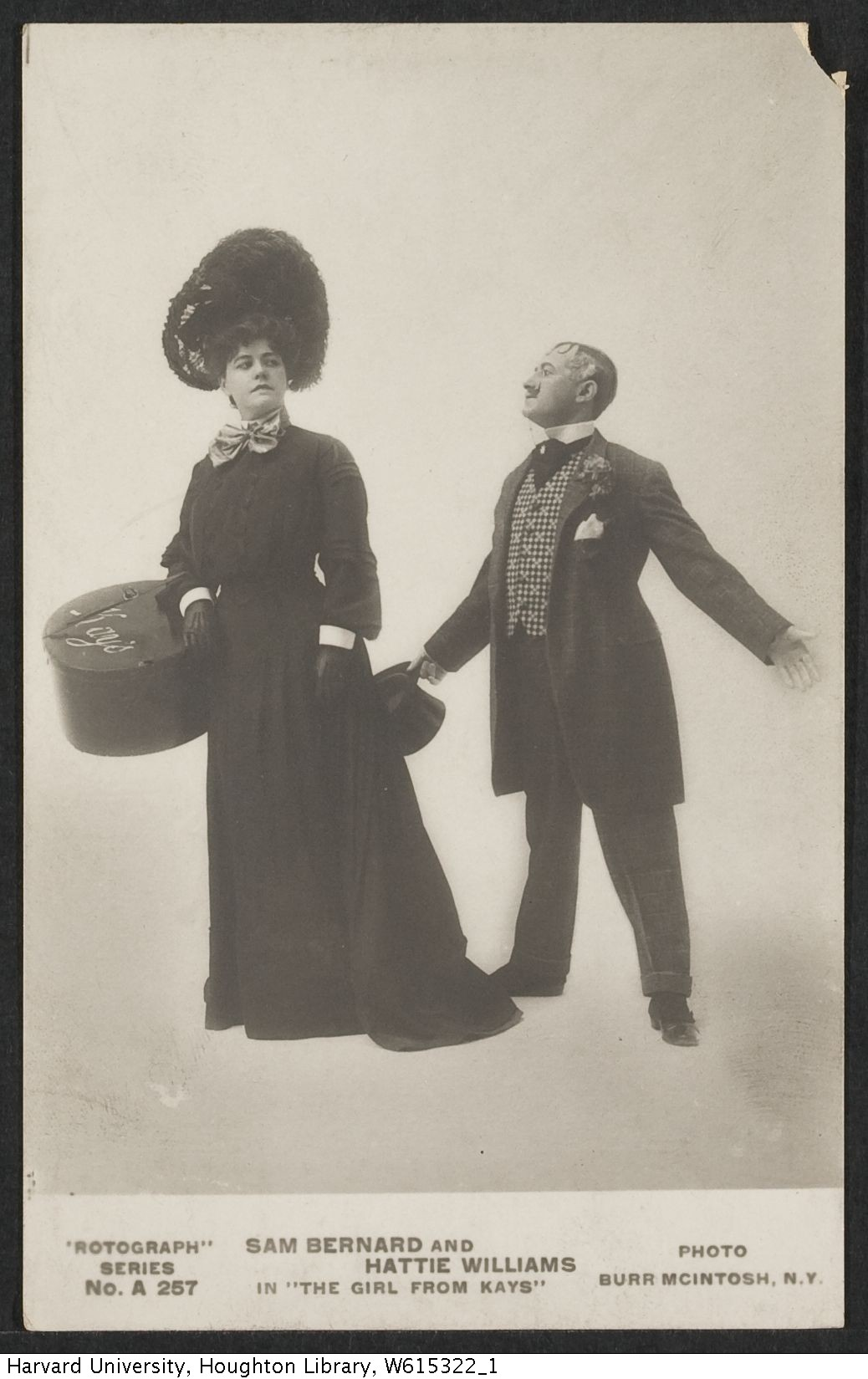
Hattie Williams and Sam Bernard from In the Girl from Kays

In 1896, Bernard became the star performer in the newly formed Weber and Fields' Broadway Music Hall company, and appeared in many of their classic theatre sketches, often performing with Weber and Fields. He remained with the company until 1902, except for a period in 1899–1900 when he starred with Marie Dressler in the musical The Man in the Moon. After 1902, he worked primarily in Broadway musicals, including The Girl from Kays (1903), in which he created his character Mr Hoggenheimer and starred with Hattie Williams. His later successes included The Rollicking Girl (1905), The Rich Mr Hoggenheimer (1906), The Girl and the Wizard (1909), He Came From Milwaukee (1910); All for the Ladies (1912); The Belle of Bond Street (1914); and The Century Girl (1916).

He began to explore acting in motion pictures in 1915, after he was signed to the Triangle Film Corporation. His movies included Fatty and the Broadway Stars (1915, with Fatty Arbuckle), Poor Schmaltz (1915), The Great Pearl Tangle (1916), and Because He Loved Her (1916).

He returned to stage revues in Friendly Enemies (1918), As You Were (1920), and Irving Berlin's Music Box Revue (1921), and wrote and starred in Nifties of 1923.

Sam Bernard died of apoplexy while aboard the SS Columbus after its departure from New York en route to Europe.

== Acting credits ==
=== Theatre ===
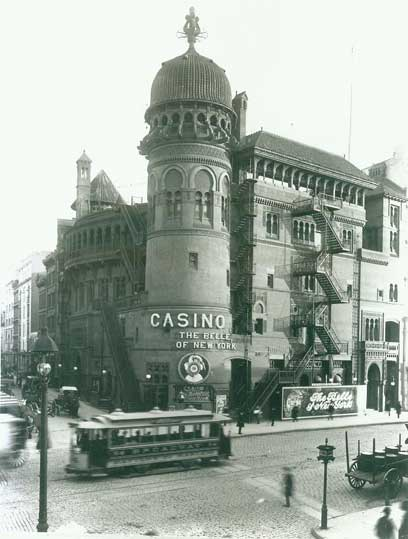
Casino Theatre – 1900 Sam Bernard appeared here in The Belle of Bohemia (1900)

Selected plays:

- The Man in the Moon (1899)
- The Belle of Bohemia (1900)
- Hoity Toity (1901)
- The Girl from Kays (1904)
- The Rollicking Girl (1905)
- The Rich Mr. Hoggenheimer (1906)
- Nearly a Hero (1908)
- The Girl and the Wizard (1909)
- He Came from Milwaukee (1910)
- All for the Ladies (1912)
- The Belle of Bond Street (1914)
- The Century Girl (1916)
- Friendly Enemies (1918)
- As You Were (1920)
- Music Box Revue (1923)

=== Films ===
Some of the movies in which he was featured include:

- A Janitor's Wife's Temptation (1915)
- Because He Loved Her (1915)
- Fatty And The Broadway Stars (1915)
- Poor Schmaltz (1915)
- The Great Pearl Tangle (1916)
- Call A Cop (1921)
