= Hattie Williams =

American actress

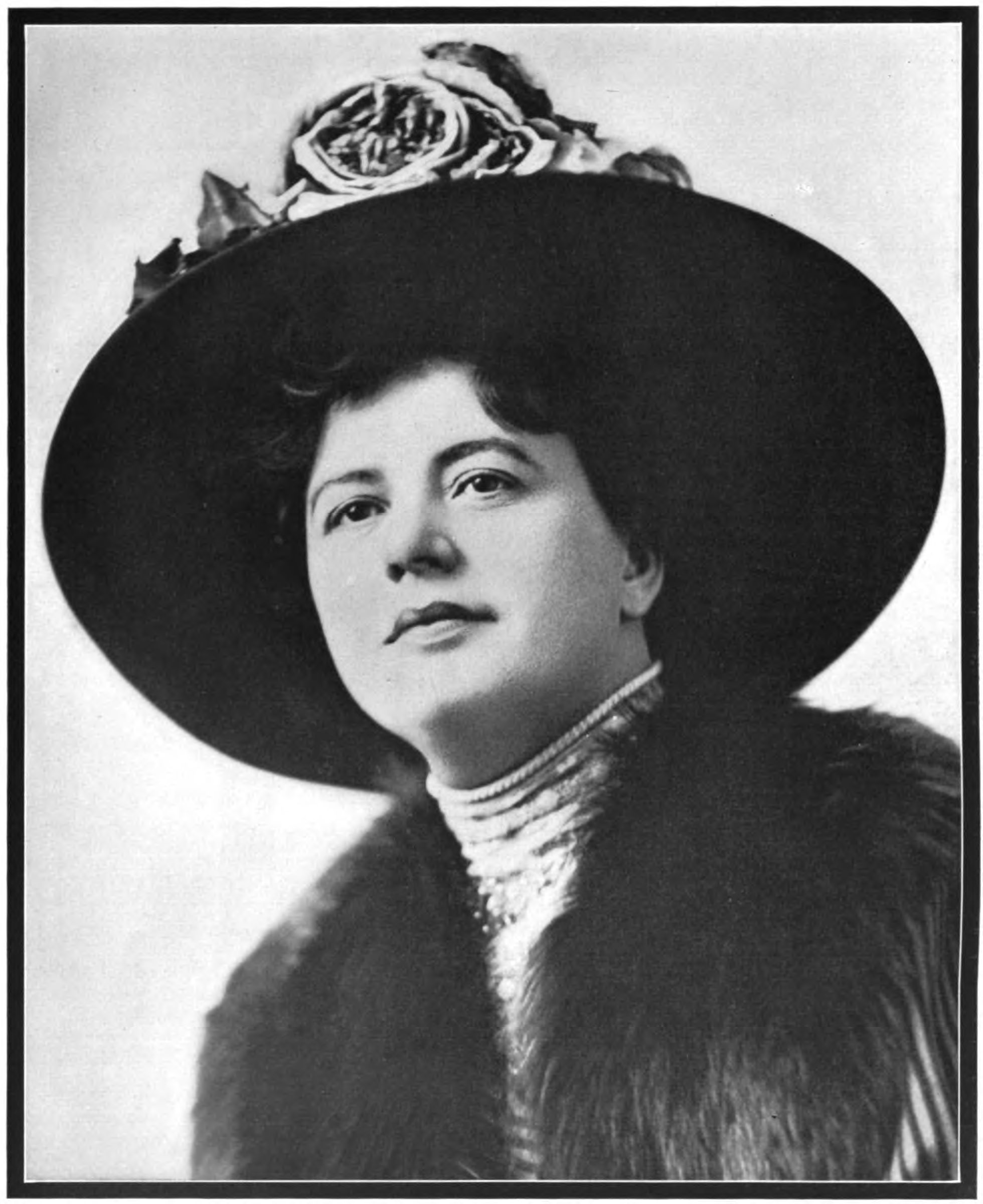
- Williams in 1909
- Born: March 17, 1870; Boston, Massachusetts U.S.
- Died: August 17, 1942 (aged 72); Bronx, New York City, U.S.
- Occupation: Actress
- Years active: 1893–1915

Hattie Williams (March 17, 1870 - August 17, 1942) was an American stage actress, comedian and vocalist from Boston. She was a popular player in vaudeville and with Charles Frohman's theatrical company at the turn of the twentieth century and appeared often at his famous Empire Theatre, New York.

== Career ==
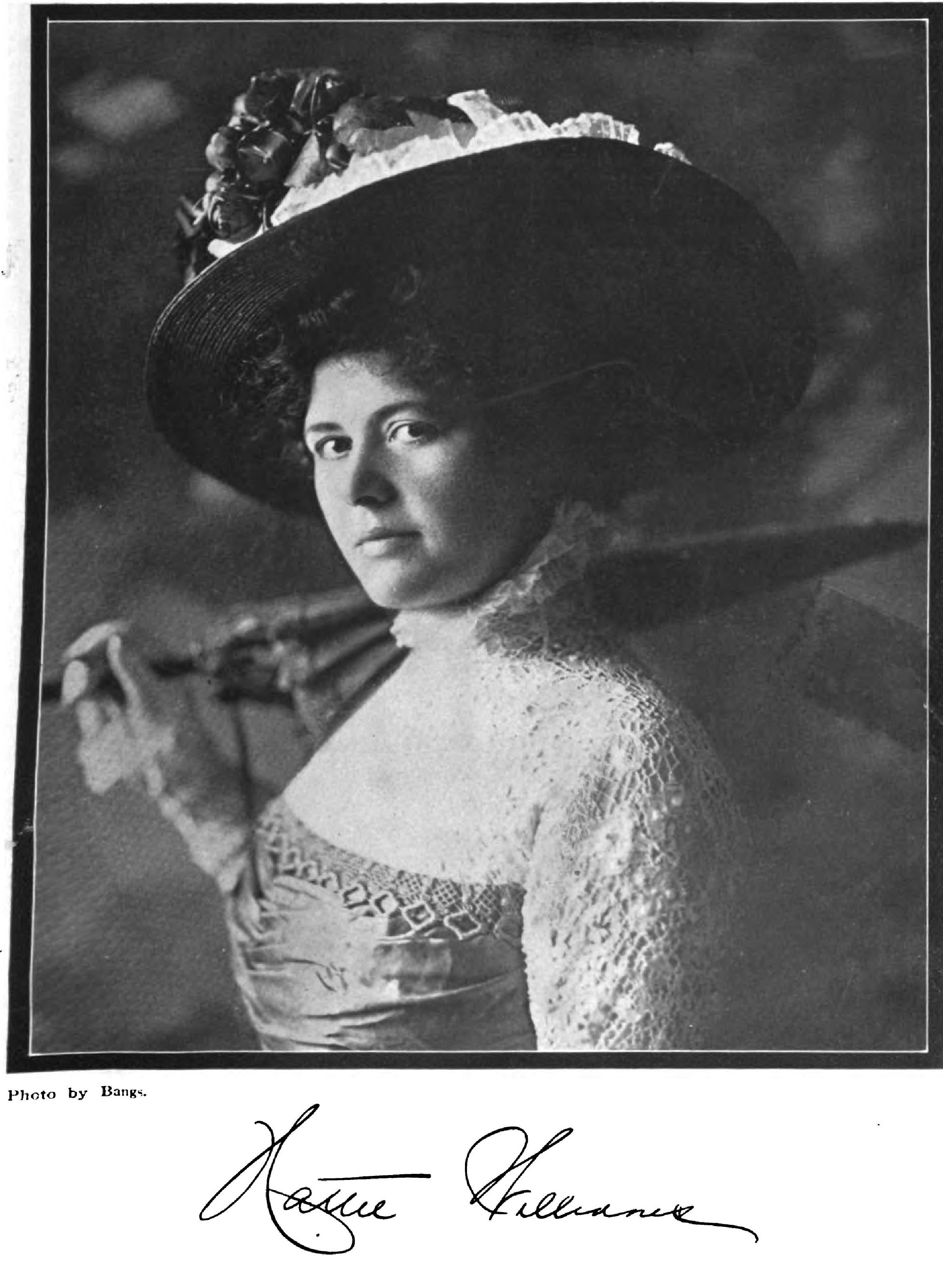
Hattie Williams in 1908.

Williams first gained fame in several farcical plays by Charles Hoyt. In 1886, she performed with John A. Arneaux's Shakespearean acting troupe as Lady Anne in Richard III. Williams retired from the theatre in 1914 at the height of her career. She appeared in only one motion picture Glorianna's Getaway (1915), a short film.

Under the Frohman banner she and Ethel Barrymore were occasionally rivals.

== Personal life ==
Williams was good friends with the actor Richard Carle and they sometimes summered together on Long Island in the off season. She died August 17, 1942, in the Bronx New York.

== Popular plays ==
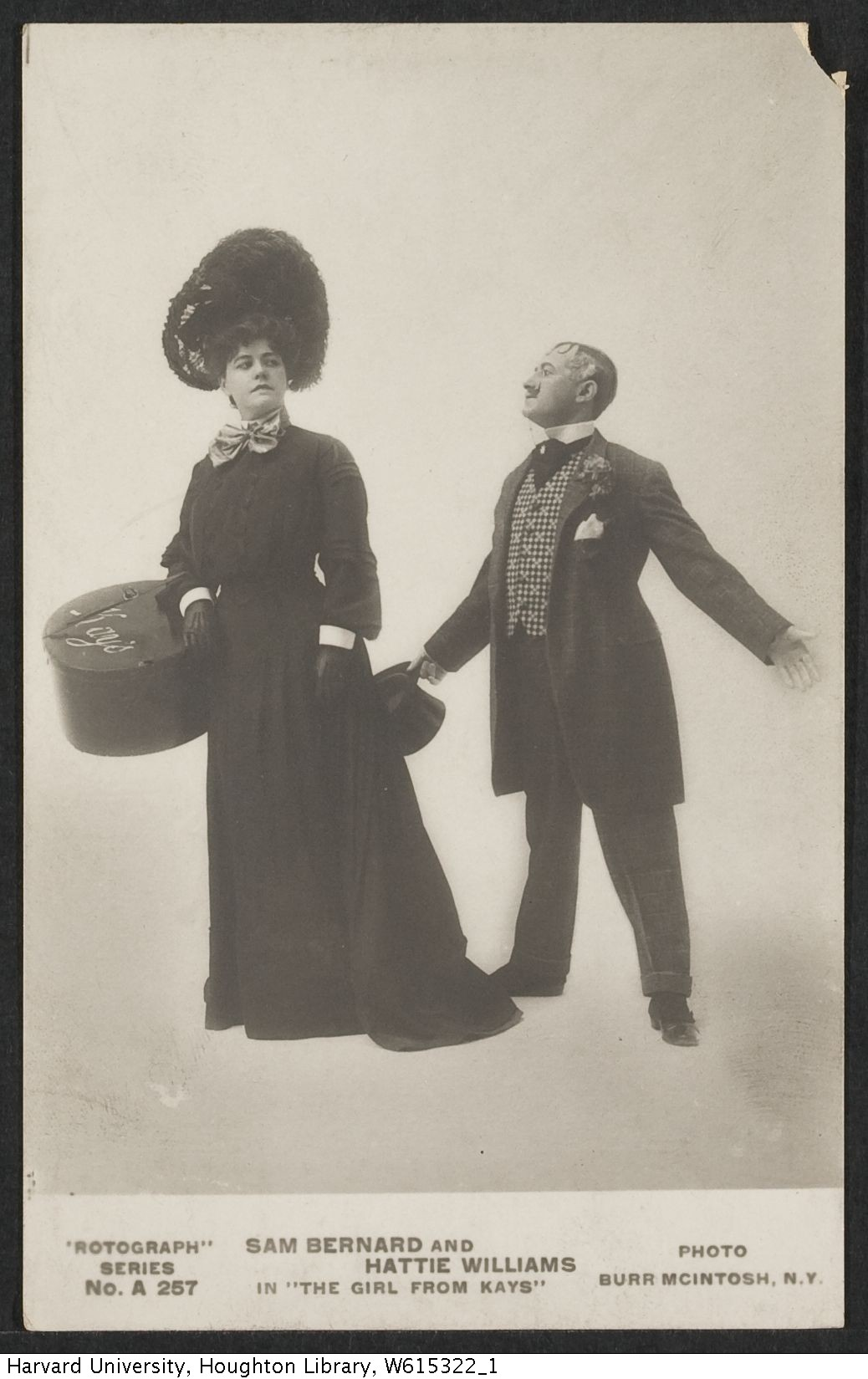
Hattie Williams and Sam Bernard in The Girl from Kays

- Vivian's Papas (1903)
- The Girl from Kays (1904)
- The Rollicking Girl (1905)
- The Little Cherub (1906)
- Fluffy Ruffles (1908)
- A Slice of Life (1912) (*with Ethel and John Barrymore)
- The Doll Girl (1913)
