= Two Little Girls in Blue =

1921 musical theatre work composed by Paul Lannin and Vincent Youmans

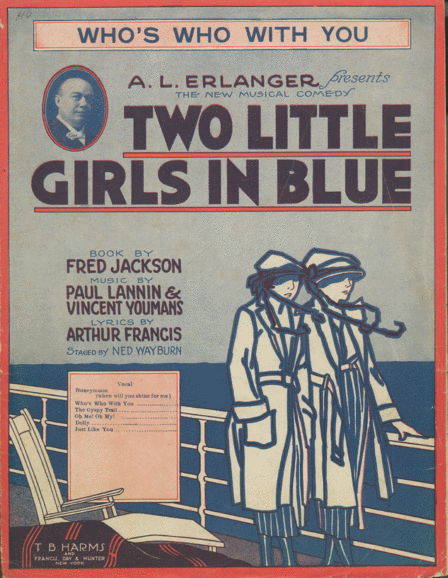
- Original sheet music cover
- Music: Paul Lannin; Vincent Youmans
- Lyrics: Ira Gershwin
- Book: Fred Jackson
- Productions: 1921 Broadway

Two Little Girls in Blue is a musical theatre work composed by Paul Lannin and Vincent Youmans, with lyrics primarily by Ira Gershwin (under the pseudonym "Arthur Francis") and a libretto by Fred Jackson. The musical takes place aboard the S.S. Empress and in India. The musical premiered at George M. Cohan's Theatre on Broadway on May 3, 1921, and closed on August 27 of the same year.

== History ==
=== Background ===
The first "conference" for the show was held at the Garden City Hotel, where Lannin worked as a chef. According to Gershwin, "His father wanted him to learn every phase of the hotel business, which didn't include composing." A.L. Erlanger was brought in as producer, though Youmans and Gershwin were "urged to keep in the background," as Erlanger would be hesitant to produce a work with young writers.

=== 1921 Broadway premiere ===
The original production, produced by Erlanger and staged by Ned Wayburn, premiered at the George M. Cohan's Theatre in the Broadway Theater District in New York City on May 3, 1921, beginning a run of 135 performances. The opening night cast included Olin Howland, Madeline and Marion Fairbanks, Oscar Shaw, Edward Begley, and Virginia Earle. There had been a tryout in the Colonial Theatre in Boston on April 11, 1921, and there was a post-Broadway tour that included Baltimore and Philadelphia.

The May 4 review in The New York Clipper stated: "The lyrics written by Arthur Francis are the best, and seem to show that there are some lyricists who are still able to write a lyric that rhymes also means something." Despite positive comments, Gershwin later wrote that working with Youmans was not a pleasure, as "he wanted to do everything; write, publish, produce, conduct, and show people down the aisle." Wayburn also gave negative statements: "I'm not satisfied to retire from the calling of Producing Stage Director with the reputation of being 'the world's greatest buck dancer.'"

=== 1978 Off-Broadway revival ===
An off-Broadway revival was produced in 1978. While all of Gershwin's lyrics remained intact, roughly one third of the score had been lost and was recomposed by Nathan Hurwitz. This production was produced by David Mayhew and Victoria Sanders, directed by Joe Restuccia, starring Alison Bevan, Amelia Davis, Wayne Federman, and Leigh Strimbeck. It ran for only a few weeks at The West 3rd Street Theatre, a 99-seat black box venue downtown.

== Musical numbers ==
Act I

- (We're Off on) A Wonderful Trip
- (Your) Wonderful U.S.A
- When I'm With the Girls
- Two Little Girls in Blue
- The Silly Season
- Oh Me, Oh My, Oh You
- You Started Something When You Came Along
- We're Off to India

Act II

- Here, Steward
- The Gypsy Trail††
- Dolly†
- Who's Who With You?
- Just Like You
- There's Something About Me They Like§
- Rice and Shoes (Sweetest Girl)†
- She's Innocent

Act III

- Honeymoon (When Will You Shine for Me?)
- I'm Tickled Silly (Slapstick)
- Orienta‡

- § Additional lyrics by Fred Jackson.
- † Additional lyrics by Schuyler Greene.
- †† Lyrics by Irving Caesar.
- ‡ Lyrics by Caesar and Greene.

A medley of Oh me! Oh my!, Two Little Girls in Blue, and Dolly
Performed by the Paul Whiteman Orchestra
