= John A. Arneaux =

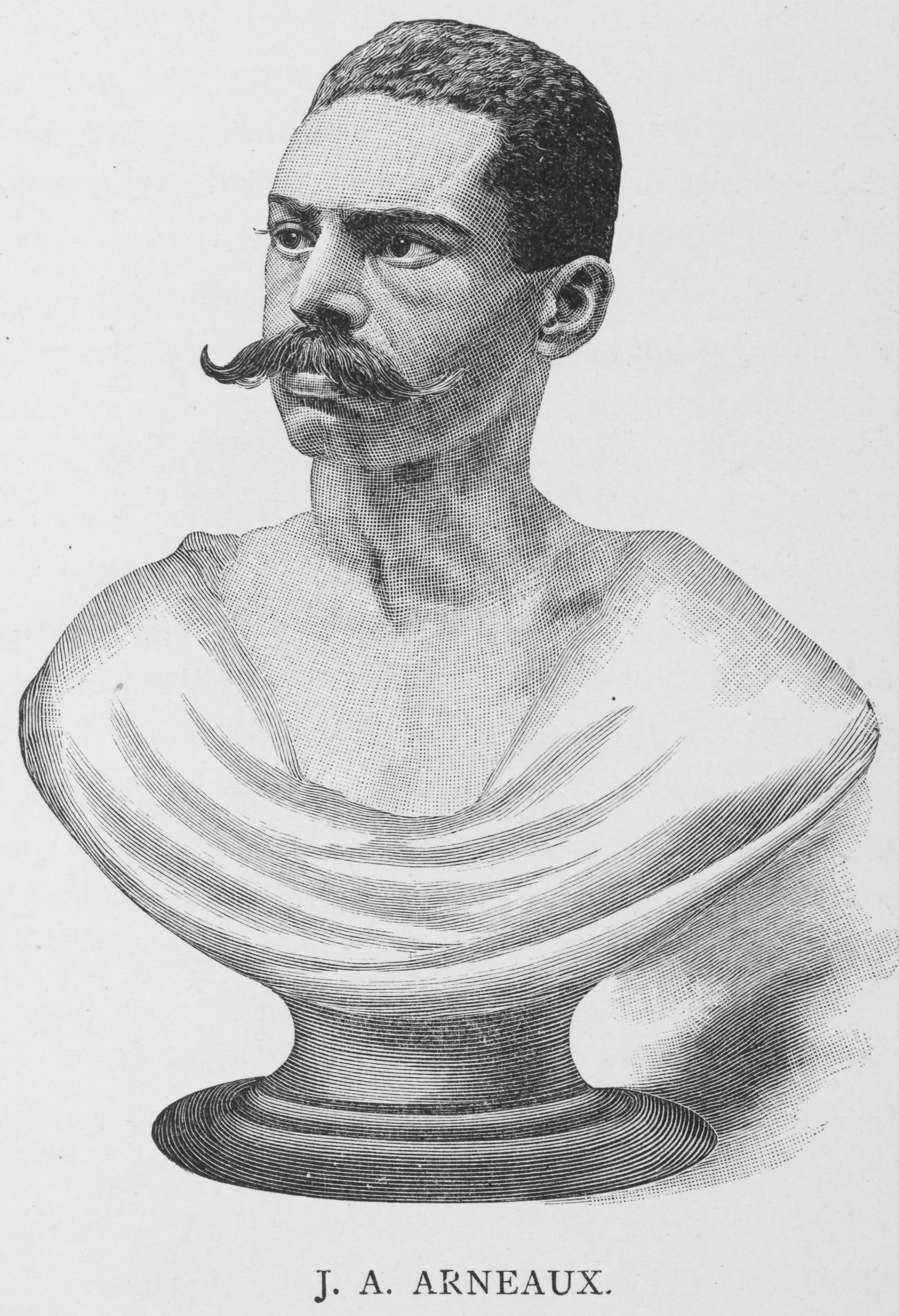
- Sketch of Bust of Arneaux from 1887
- Born: 1855; Savannah, Georgia, U.S.
- Occupations: Actor, journalist
- Political party: Republican

John A. Arneaux (born 1855) was an American Shakespearean actor and journalist in New York City. From 1884 to 1886 he was editor and owner of the New York Enterprise which had the largest circulation of any African American newspaper in the country at that time. As a journalist and a civil rights activist, he was widely respected. He was also an actor and leader of an African American theatre troupe, the Astor Place Tragedy company. Together with his friend Benjamin J. Ford, he was the leading black Shakespearean actor of his period.

== Early life ==
According to the 1887 book Men of Mark by William J. Simmons, John or Jean A. Arneaux was born in Savannah, Georgia in 1855. The chapter on Arneaux further states that his father was from Paris, France and his that his mother, who died when he was twelve years old, was an African American. However, there is no independent verification of these facts. Simmons seems to have drawn most of the biographical details about Arneaux's past from his subject's own account, and recent scholarship has called into question Arneaux's veracity when speaking of his personal history. (https://www.aithpodcast.com/the-black-booth-part-one/) The following facts are also often cited when discussing Arneaux's education (though many of them are nonsensical, as they refer to institutions that do not exist, or are misnamed): He attended school starting in 1865, and then attended "the Beach Institute" [sic] in Savannah for four years. Arneaux then moved to New York where he studied German and Latin, followed by a time in Providence, Rhode Island where he learned French at the Berlitz School of Languages (There is no record of Arneaux actually speaking French.) He then supposedly visited Paris and took two courses, one at the Académie Royal Des Inscriptions et Belles-Lettres. (However, the Académie was not then and never has been an institution of instruction, rather, it is an association of distinguished authors and scholars.) Simmons also wrote that Arneaux entered and graduated from "The New York Grand Conservatory of Music and Elocution." This institution did once exist, but it seems that Arneaux only publicly stated that he intended to attend this Conservatory, but never actually did so.

== Acting career ==
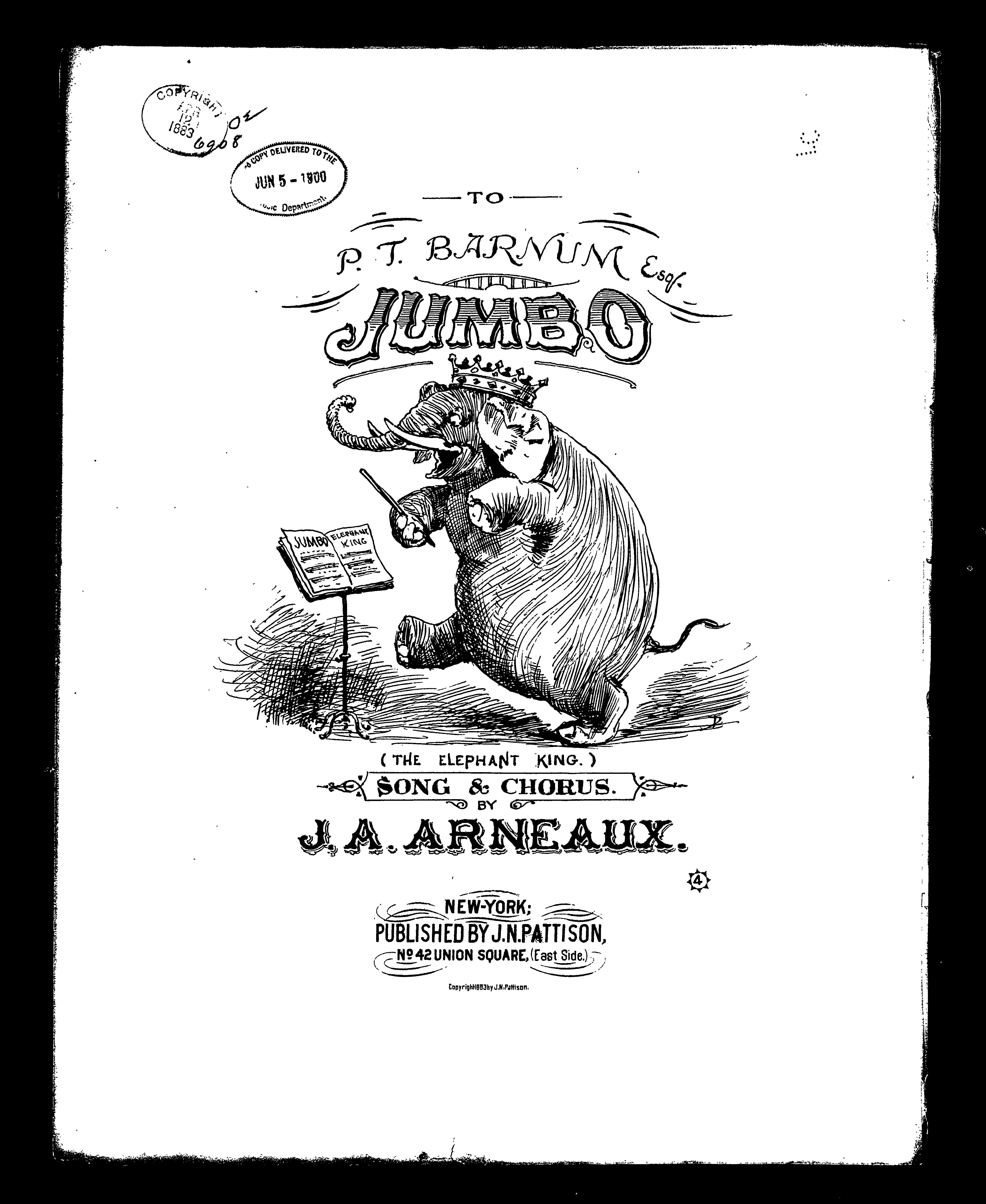
Sheet music of Arneaux's "Jumbo; the Elephant King" (1883) is on file at the United States Library of Congress.

Arneaux started in vaudeville. His first appearance on a major stage was in 1876, when he played Tom Walcott, a Southern Planter, in John S. Ladue's "Under the Yoke, or Bond and Free" at the Third Avenue theatre in New York. He did not immediately pursue a career in acting, but worked for a time as a waiter and also as a barber. In 1883, he published a song, "Jumbo, the Elephant King!". In 1884, at the urging of a theatre manager, he took the role of Iago in Othello at the Brooklyn Athenaeum, for which he received strong praise. This production was organized by Benjamin J. Ford, who had success at the New York City Lyric Theatre in 1878 as the lead of an all-black cast production of Richard III. Ford played the role of Othello, Alice Brooks played Desdemona, Marie Lavere as Emilia, B. C. Devreaux as Michael Cassio, and R. R. Cranvell as Brabantio. The group then formed what was perhaps the first Shakespearean troupe of black actors which became known as the Astor Place Tragedy company. The company was managed by Arneaux and presented plays throughout New York City; its most prominent stage was in November 1884 at the Academy of Music where it presented John Banim's Damon and Pythias, with Arneaux as Damon and Ford as Pythias. John Ladue, Henrietta Vinton Davis, and Belle Martin were also in the production.

In 1885, Arneaux took the title role in Richard III. The play was entered into an amateur theatre contest put on by the New York Enterprise and judged by editors from that paper and the New York Sun. For his work, Arneaux was awarded a gold medal. The troupe took the play to Providence, Rhode Island and then back to a number of New York stages. The show continued to tour the next year. In October 1886, the Baltimore Director wrote of Arneaux, "We have seen him in the difficult role of the Duke of Gloster [Richard III]. We have also seen Macready, Booth, and Barrett in the same character and we are free to say that Mr. Arneaux's conception of the character, his superb management of the part he assumed, were perfect." About the same time, the New York Daily News gave him the epithet, "Black Booth", referring to the lauded actor Edwin Booth. Other actors in that production include Benjamin Lightfoot as Richmond and Henry VI and Hattie Williams as Lady Anne. That November, the company revived Othello at Steinway Hall with the same actors in their previous roles except Eloise Molineaux played Emilia. Sissieretta Jones performed before the show in Providence and the entire show got good reviews in both the white and black press.

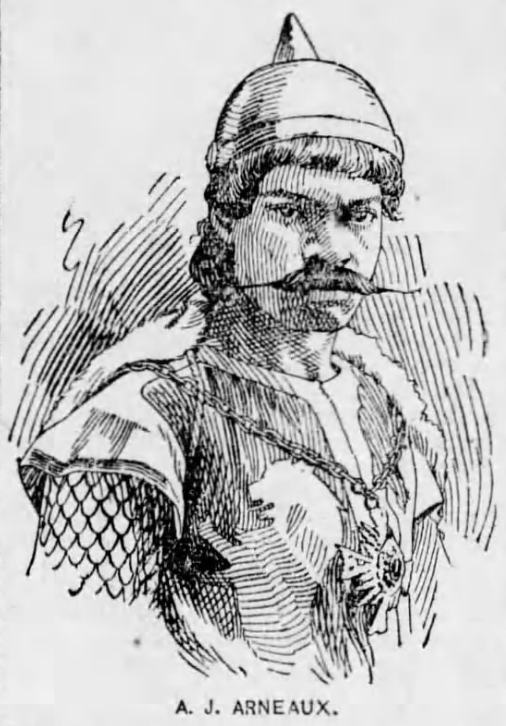
Arneaux as Richard III in 1887

In 1886, Arneaux played Romeo to Alice Franklin's Juliet in a performance of Romeo and Juliet at the Lyric Hall. Later that year Arneaux again played Richard III with Ladue as King Henry and Bertie Toney (later wife of Walter F. Craig) as Lady Anne at the Lexington Avenue Opera House. The following January the play was performed at the Academy of Music in Philadelphia. In 1887, Arneaux announced he wished to retire from the stage for two years to improve his voice and his craft as an actor. During this period, he continued to give occasional performances. He performed scenes from Macbeth as the title character with Henrietta Vinton Davis as Lady Macbeth and Thomas Symmonds as Macduff and as Duncan in April 1887 at Clarendon Hall. In 1888, Arneaux performed scenes from Othello and Macbeth with Hurle Bavardo and Alice Franklin at Baltimore's Wilson Post Hall.

=== Style ===
He based his performance of "Richard III" on that of Edwin Booth, to whom he was often favorably compared. He was also noted for his long mustache worn for that role. Especially due to his roles in Othello, he was said to be a follower of African American actor Ira Aldridge, who had become famous worldwide for his performance as Othello from the 1820s through the 1860s. Arnaux fit into a pantheon of black actors who played that role starting with Aldridge, followed by Arneaux, John Hewlett, and Paul Robeson.

== Journalism ==
Arneaux also was on the staff of many New York newspapers, first the New York World in 1883 where he worked for one year before taking a position with the New York Daily News and then the New York Sun. In 1884 he resigned from a position at the Sun to become associate editor of the Literary Enterprise which of which he became editor. The Enterprise had been formed in 1883 by Lanson, Wilson, and Firman as the journal of the Lincoln Literary Society. He then became the owner of the paper and changed its name to New York Enterprise. In the paper he opposed the word "colored" in favor of "Africo-American" and advocated for other causes, including industrial schools and the creation of an African Historical Society. in 1886, the Enterprise was reputed to have the largest circulation of any African American newspaper and was called the perfection of African American journals. His office was burned down on December 14, 1886, probably in an accident, and the paper closed.

Arneaux was an important part of a network of African American journalists active at that time, such as T. Thomas Fortune, A. F. Bradley, John Wesley Cromwell, L. A. Martinet, J. H. Keeble, and Richard R. Wright, who were all prominent speakers at the 1886 Atlantic City convention of the Negro Press Association. He was also a correspondent and friend to Ida B. Wells. In 1887, Arneaux returned to the Sun and then moved to the New York World. In August, Arneaux again presented at the National Colored Press Convention, which was in Louisville, Kentucky that year. Arneaux was noted for being one of the few black journalists writing for non-African American papers, which included Sun, World, and Daily News.

== Later life ==
In late 1887, Arneaux traveled to the Catskills with a plan to move to Paris and pursue a stage career there. He was asked by a newspaper reporter if he would re-open the Enterprise, but he noted that an editor of an African American journal will lose money on the paper, and after the fire, he was not certain it would be supported. He did wish to go back into journalism at some point in the future. Shortly before April 14, 1888, Arneaux traveled to Canada, and later that year to Paris. He suffered from vertigo and was seeking a change in climate. He supposedly made his home in Europe for at least a decade, but not much is known about his later career. He left Paris for London in 1890, and then traveled to Germany. A play was supposedly written for Arneaux while he was in Europe, and he announced plans to return to the US in October 1891 to produce the work. But no tour ever took place. In 1900, it was stated in a newspaper item that Arneaux was "still living in Paris," but it's unclear if he actually was actually in Paris at the time - no other references supporting his presence there can be found.

== Politics and other activities ==
He was a Republican and an outspoken opponent of segregation and Jim Crow laws. He was radical in his approach and together with William A. Freeman, Arneaux publicly clashed with Frederick Douglass in December 1884 over Douglass's inactivity. He also published a number of poems and was active in freemasonry.
