= Mr. Wilkinson's Widows =

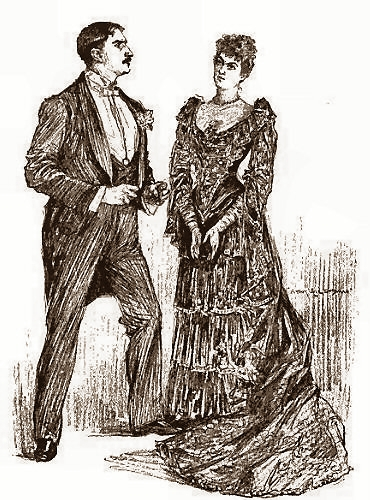
Scene with Mr. and Mrs. Perrin. Mr. Perrin: You told him you were married to a fool! Mrs. Perrin: I wouldn’t tell anyone that; there are some things we should keep to ourselves. Illustrated American, 1891

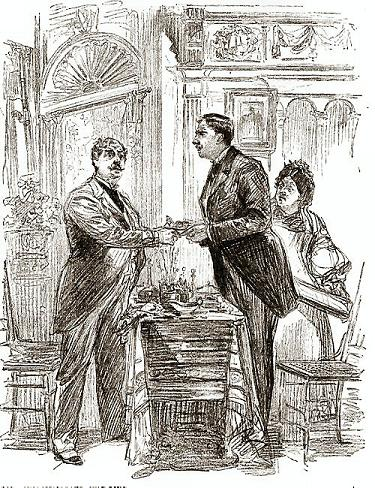
Scene with Mr. Perrin, Maj. Mallory and Mary; Perrin: Never mind; if you don’t like it, I’ll take it away. Mallory: It’s all right. I do like it, my boy, I do like it. Illustrated American, 1891

Mr. Wilkinson's Widows is a farce-comedy in Three Acts by William Gillette from the Alexandre Bisson play Feu Toupinel. The play opened under the management of Charles Frohman on Monday, March 30, 1891 at Proctor's Theatre and continued until the end of the season with the final curtain falling on June 13. Mr. Wilkinson's Widows returned some ten weeks later with the coming of the new season and remained open until October 3, 1891.

== Synopsis ==
The plot of Mr. Wilkinson's Widows, revolves around Mrs. Percival Perrin and Mrs. Henry F. Dickerson, both widowed seven years earlier, now remarried and living under the same roof. Each is unaware that their late husbands were in fact the same man, Mr. Wilkinson. The introduction into the story of a former admirer of Mrs. Dickerson, Major Mallory, sets off a chain of events that disrupts the domestic bliss of both women and eventually unravels the late Mr. Wilkinson’s secret.

== Revue ==
Los Angeles Herald, February 5, 1892

"Why is it that American play-writers still have to go to Germany or France for themes of their work? Mr. Gillette has made a delightful comedy out of Mr. Wilkinson's Widows, but all he did to the original play was to cut out the risqué lines. There was an entire absence of any American tone or color, or of originality about the comedy, delightful as it was. It is to be hoped that Mr. Gillette will not become a mere adapter."

== New York Cast ==
- Benjamin Duckworth: J. W. Thompson
- Susanna McAuliff: Maud White
- Henry F. Dickerson: Fred Bond
- Mrs. Henry F. Dickerson: Henrietta Crosman/ Esther Lyons (June 1–13)
- Percival Perrin: Joseph Holland
- Mrs. Percival Perrin: Louise Thorndyke Bouciacault
- E. E. Pembroke: Thomas Wise
- Maj. P. Ferguson Mallory: Thomas Burns
- Mary: Annie Wood
- Julia: Lillian Leach

August Replacements

- Mrs. Percival Perrin: Georgiana Drew
- Mrs. Henry F. Dickerson: Emily Bancker
- E. E. Pembroke: Harry Allen
- Susanna McAulff: Mattie Ferguson

== Sources ==
- Allston Brown (1903). A History of the New York Stage from the First Performance in 1732 to 1901. Vol. 3. p. 512.
- Charles Smith Cheltnam (1892). The Dramatic Year Book for 1891. Trischler. p. 346.
