= Frank Lawton =

English actor (1904–1969)

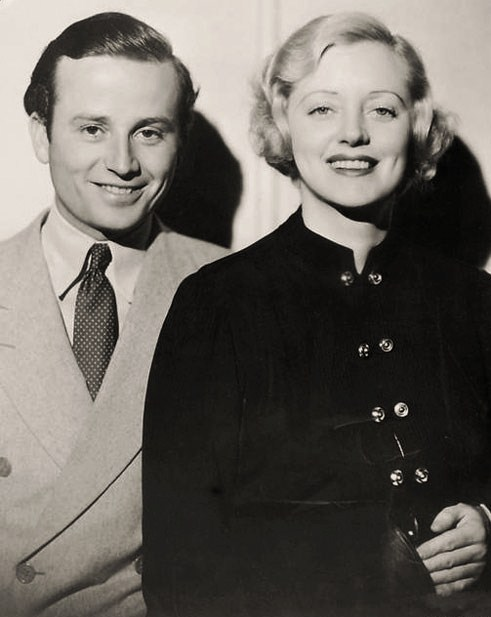
- Lawton and his wife, Evelyn Laye, in 1934
- Born: Frank Lawton Mokeley; 30 September 1904; St Giles, London, England
- Died: 10 June 1969 (aged 64); Marylebone, London, England
- Occupation: Actor
- Spouse: Evelyn Laye (m. 1934)
- Father: Frank Lawton

Frank Lawton Mokeley (30 September 1904 – 10 June 1969) was an English actor.

== Biography ==
Frank Lawton was born in St Giles, London, on 30 September 1904. His parents were stage players Daisy May Collier and Frank Mokely Lawton. His first major screen credit was Young Woodley (1930). In the mid-1930s, Lawton appeared in some Hollywood films, most significantly as the adult David Copperfield in MGM's classic literature adaptation of David Copperfield (1935). However, Lawton never made his big breakthrough in Hollywood and returned to British film and theatre.

He was married to actress Evelyn Laye from 1934 until his death in 1969 aged 64. They acted together several times, including in the TV series My Husband and I.

During World War II, he joined the British Army in the Kings Royal Rifle Corps and rose to the rank of major. He was assigned as a liaison officer to the United States Army and ultimately was awarded the Legion of Merit, Degree of Legionnaire for his service.

In the West End, he appeared in Alex Atkinson's Four Winds (1953) and Ronald Miller's Waiting for Gillian (1954). He appeared alongside his wife in Michael Clayton Hutton's Silver Wedding in 1957.

Frank Lawton died at his home in London on 10 June 1969.

== Filmography ==
Year	Title	Role	Notes
1930	Young Woodley	Woodley	
1930	Birds of Prey	Jimmy Hilton	
1931	The Skin Game	Rolf Hornblower	
1931	The Outsider	Basil Owen	
1931	Michael and Mary	David Rowe	
1931	After Office Hours	Hec	
1933	Cavalcade	Joe Marryot	
1933	Heads We Go	Toby Tyrrell	
1933	Friday the Thirteenth	Frank Parsons	
1934	One More River	Tony Croom	
1935	David Copperfield	David Copperfield	
1936	The Invisible Ray	Ronald Drake	
1936	The Devil-Doll	Toto	
1936	The Mill on the Floss	Philip Wakem	
1939	The Four Just Men	James Terry	
1942	Went the Day Well?	Tom Sturry	
1948	The Winslow Boy	John Watherstone	
1953	Rough Shoot	Hassingham	
1955	Above Us the Waves	Naval officer in briefing roon	Uncredited
1956	Doublecross	Chief Constable	
1957	The Rising of the Moon	British officer	(3rd Episode)
1958	Gideon's Day	Liggot	
1958	A Night to Remember	Chairman and managing director of White Star Line J. Bruce Ismay	
1961	The Queen's Guards	Cmdr. Hewson	
