= Our Flat =

1889 play by Mrs. H. Musgrave

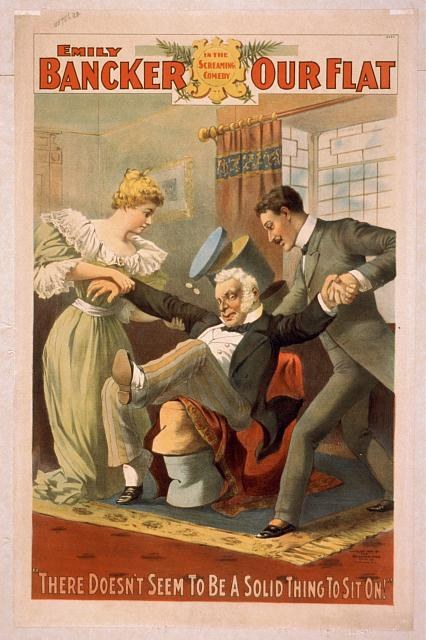
Library of Congress Prints and Photographs Division

Our Flat is a farce-comedy by Mrs. H. Musgrave first produced as a matinee performance on June 13, 1889, at the Prince of Wales Theatre. The play made its New York premier on October 21, 1889, at the Lyceum Theatre. In the mid-1890s Our Flat became a successful vehicle for actress Emily Bancker on road tours of North American venues.

== Synopsis ==
The Gazette, January 9, 1895

The story of the play runs as follows: Mr. and Mrs. Sylvester are two young persons who have rushed into matrimony on the Micawber Principle; are living from hand to mouth in a London flat, husband and wife alike striving hard to get a foothold in the literary sphere, in which they are confident they can ultimately acquire both fame and fortune. Early in their careers, however, they are overwhelmed with debt. The flat they have hired is invaded by a continual stream of creditors; the cook threaten to leave, and at the height of the excitement three men in and deliberately carry off all the furniture, which has been bought on the installment plan, because the last payment has not been made. At that instant Mrs. Sylvester receives a note informing her that a play she has written without the knowledge of her husband, describing her own marriage experience, has been accepted, and that the manager is coming to settle as to its price. Therefore, with the assistance of the cook, she proceeds to improvise the furniture with whatever comes to hand, soap boxes, barrels, an ironing-board, a sit bath tub, a clothes-horse, etc., and proceeds to rehabilitate the apartment. They are so draped and arranged as to form quite a beautiful outfit, and when the manager comes, he is so impressed with the handsome and prosperous look of the surroundings that he pays $1,000 for the play. Many laughable complications arise from attempts to use the makeshift furniture. Then Mr. Sylvester’s father, who has been angered by the marriage, relents and the comedy comes to a happy conclusion.

== Reviews ==
Outing Magazine, October, 1889-March, 1890

OUR FLAT, a comedy by Mrs. Musgrove, delighted large audiences at the Lyceum Theatre for a number of weeks. To be sure the play should rather be called a farce than a comedy. However, much in it was laughter provoking, and the scene in which Mrs. Sylvester cleverly provides makeshifts for the furniture procured on the installment plan, which is seized because of failure to pay on account, is really very good. The play was succeeded by "The Charity Ball," with which the regular season was begun. Mr. Frohman's excellent company made the most of the play, which is a pleasing bit of humor. It will probably be on the boards for a long run.

The Gazette, January 9, 1895

Much interest is manifested in the appearance of Miss Emily Bancker and her company, at Grand Opera House, next Saturday night in Our Flat, one of the finest and most humorous farce comedies on the American stage. The cast is headed by Miss Emily Bancker, who was the late Rosina Vokes' leading lady for two seasons and principle in Chas. Frohman’s original productions. Last year she was the star of “Gloriana.” Her success this season as Margery Sylvester has been phenomenal.

== Cast ==
- New York
- Reginald Sylvester: H. B. Conway
- Margery Sylvester: Mrs. Thorndyke-Boucicault
- Clarence Vane: Morton Selten
- McCullum: Thomas Whiffen
- Nathaniel Glover: R. F. Cotton
- Stout: Louis Hendricks
- Pinchard: Edward Coleman
- Lucy McCullum: Josie Stoffer
- Bella: Lillian Alliston
- Madame Volant: Kate Pattison-Selten
- Clara: Marion Russell
- Elise Claremont: Ida Waterman
