= Four Winds (play) =

1953 play

- Written by: Alex Atkinson
- Original language: English
- Genre: Mystery thriller

Premiere
- Date premiered: 6 July 1953
- Place premiered: Theatre Royal, Brighton

Four Winds is a 1953 thriller play by the British writer Alex Atkinson. A murder mystery it takes place entirely in a cottage on the edge of the Yorkshire Moors.

It premiered at the Theatre Royal, Brighton before transferring to the Phoenix Theatre in London's West where it ran for 38 performances between 29 September and 31 October 1953. The original cast included William Kendall, Frank Lawton, Raymond Francis, Peggy Evans, Betty Ann Davies and Patricia Cutts. It then went on tour.

== Bibliography ==
- Wearing, J.P. The London Stage 1950-1959: A Calendar of Productions, Performers, and Personnel. Rowman & Littlefield, 2014.
