= Marie Dainton =

British opera singer (1881–1938)

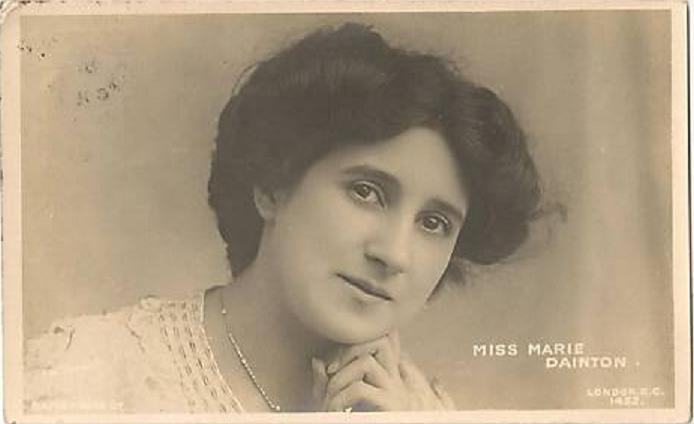
Marie Dainton c.1910

Marie Dainton (8 June c. 1881 – 1 February 1938) was an actress of the Victorian and Edwardian eras who appeared regularly in both music halls and in dramatic theatre.

== Early career ==
Dainton was born in Russia, apparently in 1881, but other sources cite 1877. Her father was Robert E. Sharlach, and her mother was the English actress and singer Jenny Dawson (d. 1936). Dainton made her stage debut on 24 March 1894 at York Theatre Royal in Little Red Riding Hood. In this show, she gave imitations of well-known theatrical personalities, and this gift for mimicry became her trademark. Dainton became a versatile performer in various theatrical genres, including musical comedy, pantomime and revue.

Dainton made her first London appearance at the Metropolitan music hall in Edgware Road on 6 August 1894. On 24 December 1894 she opened as 'Mr Falsehood' in The House that Jack Built at the Opera Comique, and the following year toured as Flo in Buttercup and Daisy. The next few years were spent appearing mainly in the music halls until June 1899 when she scored a big success at the Avenue Theatre giving impressions of popular stage stars in a production titled Pot Pourri. In 1898 Dainton appeared in the pantomime Puss in Boots with Eugene Stratton at the Prince of Wales Theatre in Birmingham. She also appeared in the legitimate theatre. Dainton was in demand both in London and on tour in the British provinces and abroad. During 1900 and 1901 she appeared at the Casino Theatre in New York, and at the Apollo Theatre in London, as Paquita in The Belle of Bohemia. In New York, she temporarily was restrained from appearing in the show until a breach of contract case was resolved in the courts. She also toured Austria as Fifi in The Belle of New York. At the Strand Theatre in London in 1902, she appeared in the successful musical play A Chinese Honeymoon. In 1902, she made several gramophone recordings for the Gramophone & Typewriter Co Ltd and Pathé of songs from this show, namely "The à la Girl", "Sweet Little Sing-Sing", and "Mandie of Ohio".

== Later years ==
Marie Dainton

Dainton was the original Peggy Machree at Wyndham's Theatre in London from 28 December 1904, and played the leading role in the original production of The Girl Behind the Counter, again at Wyndham's, from 21 April 1906. Dainton was a leading figure in the Music Hall War of 1907, alongside, among others, Joe Elvin, Gus Elen and Marie Lloyd. At the Colonial Theatre in New York in March 1909 Dainton appeared in vaudeville, again performing her mimicry of celebrities, including Harry Lauder, Anna Held, Marie Tempest, Marie Lloyd and Mrs Patrick Campbell.

In October 1909 Dainton made a second tour of the United States, playing in Philadelphia and Chicago in The Silver Star and Madame Sherry. In 1910, she toured the English provinces as Clarice in the opera The Mountaineers before returning to the music halls. Among other productions, she took part in Autumn Manoeuvres on tour in 1912, I Should Worry at The Palace Theatre and on tour in 1913.

She appeared in Society Ltd in 1920, Riverside Nights in 1926, The Eternal Flame in 1929, and in Getting George Married in 1930. Her latter appearances took place in the early 1930s, playing the Duchess of Capablanca in The Werewolf, an eight-performance run produced at the Kingsway Theatre, London, on 9 November 1932 by the Independent Theatre Club; and as a slut in the play Mary Read at London's Phoenix Theatre in 1934.

== Death ==
Marie Dainton died at the age of 56 in London on 1 February 1938 after a short illness.
