= Virginia Earle =

American actress

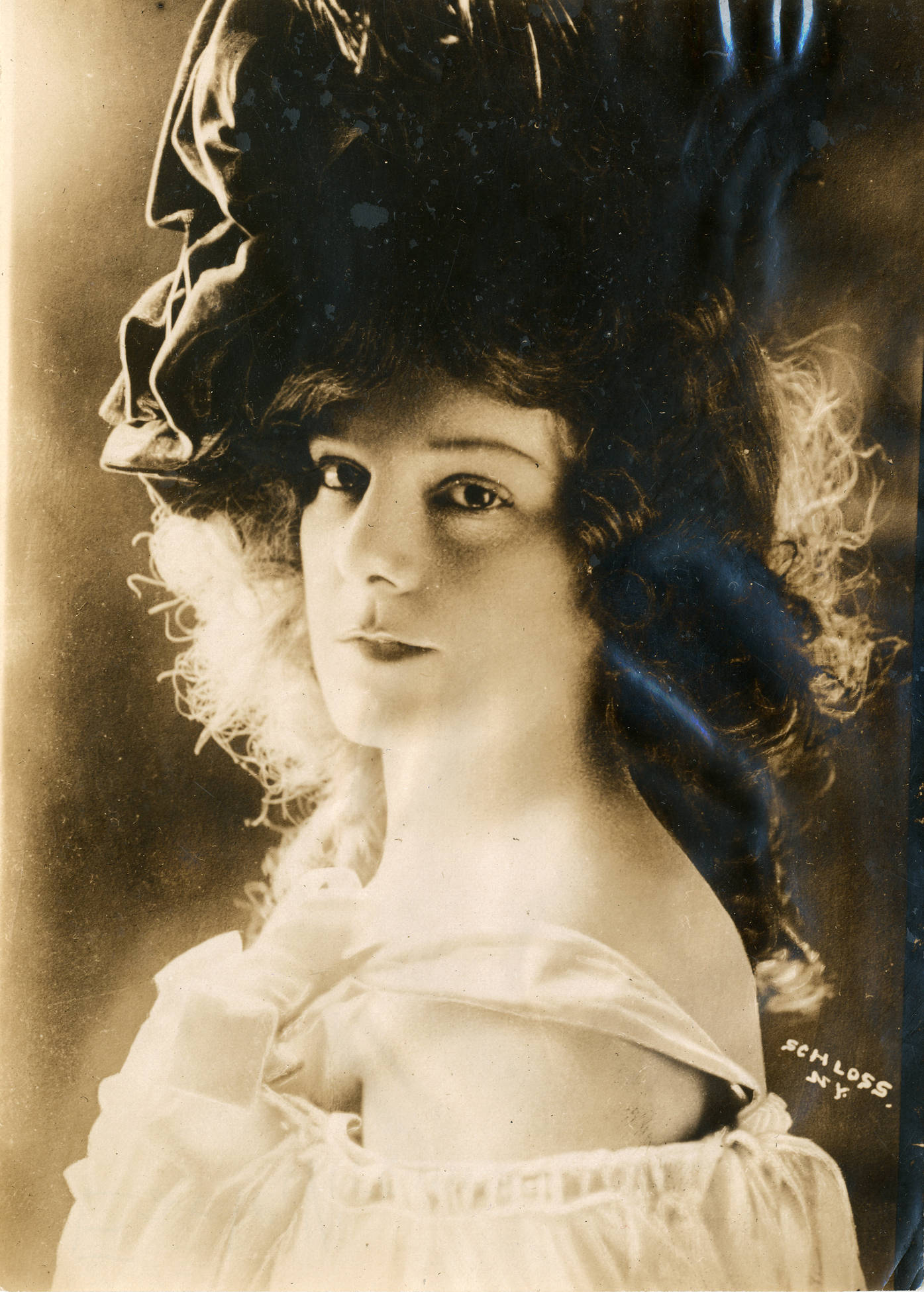
- Earle in 1908
- Born: Virginia Earl; August 6, 1873; Cincinnati, Ohio, U.S.
- Died: September 21, 1937 (aged 64); Englewood, New Jersey, U.S.
- Resting place: Calvary Cemetery; 40.7389451°N 73.9121318°W
- Occupation: Stage Actress
- Years active: 1887–1937
- Notable work: The Circus Girl, A Runaway Girl
- Spouse: Frank Lawton (m. 1894; div. 1897)

Virginia Earle (née Earl; August 6, 1873 – September 21, 1937) was an American stage actress remembered for her work in light operas, Edwardian musical comedies and vaudeville over the decades surrounding the turn of the 20th century.

== Early life and career ==
Born Virginia Earl on August 6, 1873, in Cincinnati, Ohio, she was the daughter of Irish immigrants Sara and Nathan Wheeler Earl. Earle's family later moved to Chicago where her father found employment as a machinist. Her mother and father were both said to have done some theater work, as did her younger brother, Wheeler Earl, who performed for a number of years on stage before becoming a salesman for the Hupp Motor Company.

Earle made her stage debut in 1887 playing Nanki-Poo in Gilbert and Sullivan's The Mikado with the Home Juvenile Opera Company. During her time with the Home Juvenile Opera she also played principal roles in The Pirates of Penzance, H.M.S. Pinafore and Patience.

== Vaudeville and musical comedy ==
Earle next joined the Pike Opera Company on a tour of the American West that eventually brought her to San Francisco, where she was engaged by Frederick Hallen and Joseph Hart's vaudeville company. After completing two seasons with Hallen and Hart she became associated with producer Edward E. Rice and in 1891 traveled to Australia with a troupe of actors that included George Fortescue, his wife and daughter (both named Viola) and actresses Lillian Karl, and Agnes Pearl.

Earle appeared in the comic opera portion of The Merry World, a revue written by Edgar Smith and Nicholas Biddle. It was staged at the Casino Theatre in New York City in June 1895. She was joined in the musical burlesque section by Willard Simms, Wallace Black, and Lee Harrison. As the character Vaseline, Earle sang along with Marie Laurens. Leonardo by Gilbert Burgess is a book about a Florentine sculptor who designs a statue of the Duke of Milan. During his work he falls in love with the Duke's daughter. The operetta of the same name was produced at the Garrick Theatre in October 1895 with Earle in the role of Cecilia. A critic commented that the production's costumes were "tasteful" and the operetta was "well rehearsed", but the performance itself was merely "tolerable".

The next year, The Lady Slavey, at the Casino Theatre, featured Daniel Daly, Marie Dressler, and Earle in a humorous scene in the first act. After being out of the cast for many nights, Earle returned to play the title role on April 13, 1896. She was forced to leave the cast of In Gay New York because of throat problems on June 14. She had been singing the leading role. When she returned Earle sang a new song in the part, "Only a Lump of Sugar for the Bird".

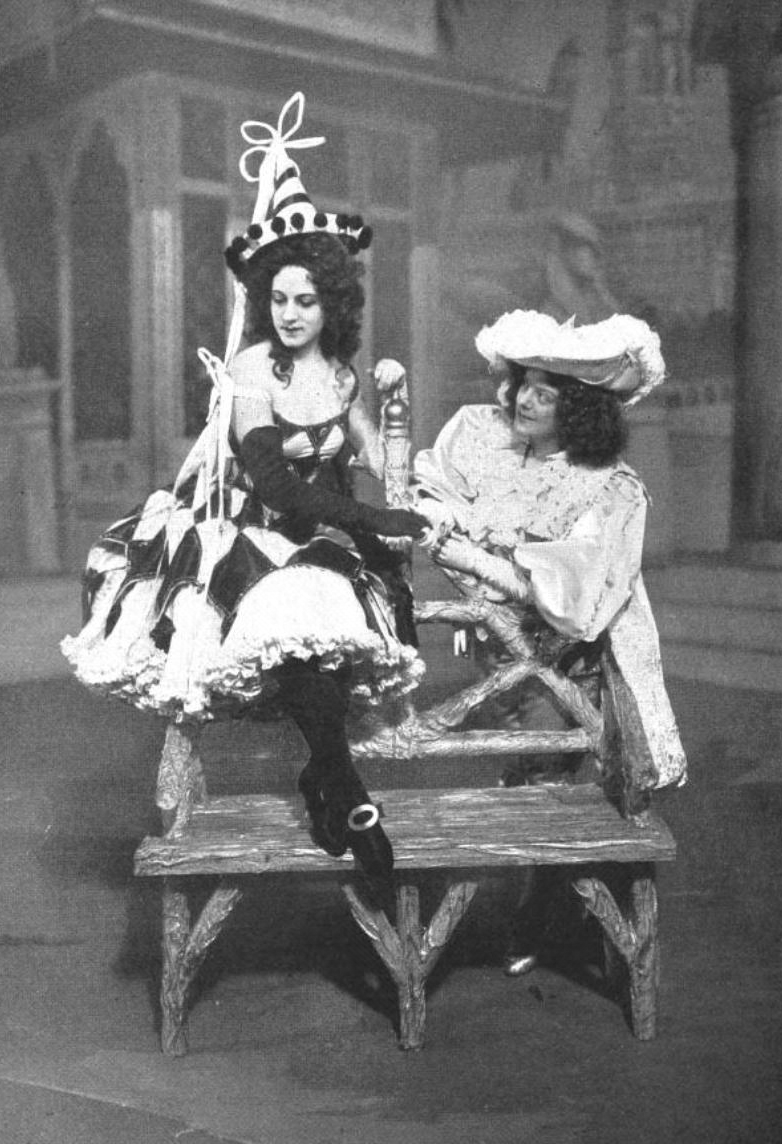
Earle as Percy (right) romances Mabelle Gilman's Laura Lee in The Casino Girl

She was identified with the Edwardian musical comedy productions of Augustin Daly for many years. Two of these musicals were The Circus Girl and A Runaway Girl. Both Earle and James T. Powers signed contracts with George W. Lederer in July 1899. In 1900 she appeared in The Belle of Bohemia and a review from the same year described Earle as being without a rival "in the present stage of her artistic development." Specifically, he made mention of her acting in a revival of The Belle of New York. In The Casino Girl she returned to the theater after an absence and depicted a young man named Percy. The setting of the play was Egypt, and it was performed at the Casino Theatre. One of the highlights was a duet between Earle and Mabelle Gilman. The New Yorkers with Earle and Daly was put on by the Herald Square Theatre in November 1901.

In April 1903 Earle was signed to be in a musical comedy at the Gaiety Theatre in London, England, by George Edwardes. It was her second London engagement and was planned for the following season. The piece was the A. Baldwin Sloane opera, Sergeant Kitty. Her services were obtained by Samuel S. Shubert of the Shubert Theatre in May 1903. She appeared in Sergeant Kitty at Daly's Theatre on Broadway (30th Street), New York City, in January 1904. Earle was summoned to rehearsal at the New Amsterdam Theatre as a member of the Klaw & Erlanger Comedy Company in October 1904. The troupe included Fay Templeton. The production, a musical burlesque about fashionable society entitled In Newport, was staged at the Liberty Theatre, 234 West 42nd Street, New York City.

Earle was in vaudeville for several seasons prior to becoming ill. She was unable to perform on Broadway for several seasons prior to landing a leading role in The Wedding Trip, with music by Reginald De Koven, in November 1911. She replaced Lina Abarbanell as Molly Seamore, the heroine, in an April 1913 production of The Geisha.

Earle appeared with the Madeline and Marion Fairbanks in a production of Two Little Girls in Blue by A.L. Erlanger in 1921. The Tomsen twins and Edward Begley were also in the cast.

== Robbery victim; superstitions ==
Earle was robbed of valuables on several occasions. She apprehended Jennie Baldwin when she recognized the woman wearing one of the cloaks she wore in a production of The Merry World. Baldwin was walking along Sixth Avenue, near 28th Street in Manhattan, when Earle seized her and screamed for help. The cloak was one of a number of thefts at the Casino during the month of September 1895. Baldwin testified that she got the cloak from her brother who was employed by the Sixth Avenue elevated railroad and had found it on the railroad tracks. Her husband admitted to finding the cloak and several people vouched for Baldwin's character. Earle received the garment back, noticing its worn condition. She offered it to a deputy clerk who declined it. Then she threw it at the deputy district attorney, exclaiming "Take the old cloak there; there!" The cloak was returned to police headquarters.

A diamond pendant valued at $550 was taken from Earle in the Hotel Bartholdt on New Year's Eve in 1895. The diamonds were found in a Ninth Avenue pawnshop, where $100 had been advanced on them. A man in charge of the "hallboys" at the hotel was charged with the crime and pleaded not guilty to a charge of grand larceny.

Earle confessed to the superstition of wearing a ring on her thumb for nine years. She thought it brought her good luck. She said the sole occasion she experienced bad luck was when she wore a hat with a peacock feather on it.

== Marriage ==
Earle married Frank Lawton (d. 1914). Lawton was an actor, whistler and comedian who became known when he played the role of Blinky Bill McGuirk in the London production of The Belle of New York, which opened at the Shaftesbury Theatre on April 12, 1899. Earle brought a divorce action against Lawton in February 1897.

== Death ==
Virginia Earle died at the age of 64 on September 21, 1937, in Englewood, New Jersey.

== Filmography ==
=== Stage ===
Year	Title	Role
1898	A Runaway Girl	Winnifred Gray
1900	The Casino Girl	
1900	The Belle of Bohemia	Katie
1901	The Girl from Up There	Phyrnette
1901	The New Yorkers	Olive Green
1901	The Supper Club	Mrs. Winifred Darling Smith
1902	Florodora	
1904	Sergeant Kitty	Kitty LaTour
1904	In Newport	Viola Cartwright
1905	Lifting the Lid	Bessie Otis Adams
1910	The Jolly Bachelors	
