= The Belle of Bohemia =

Edwardian musical comedy

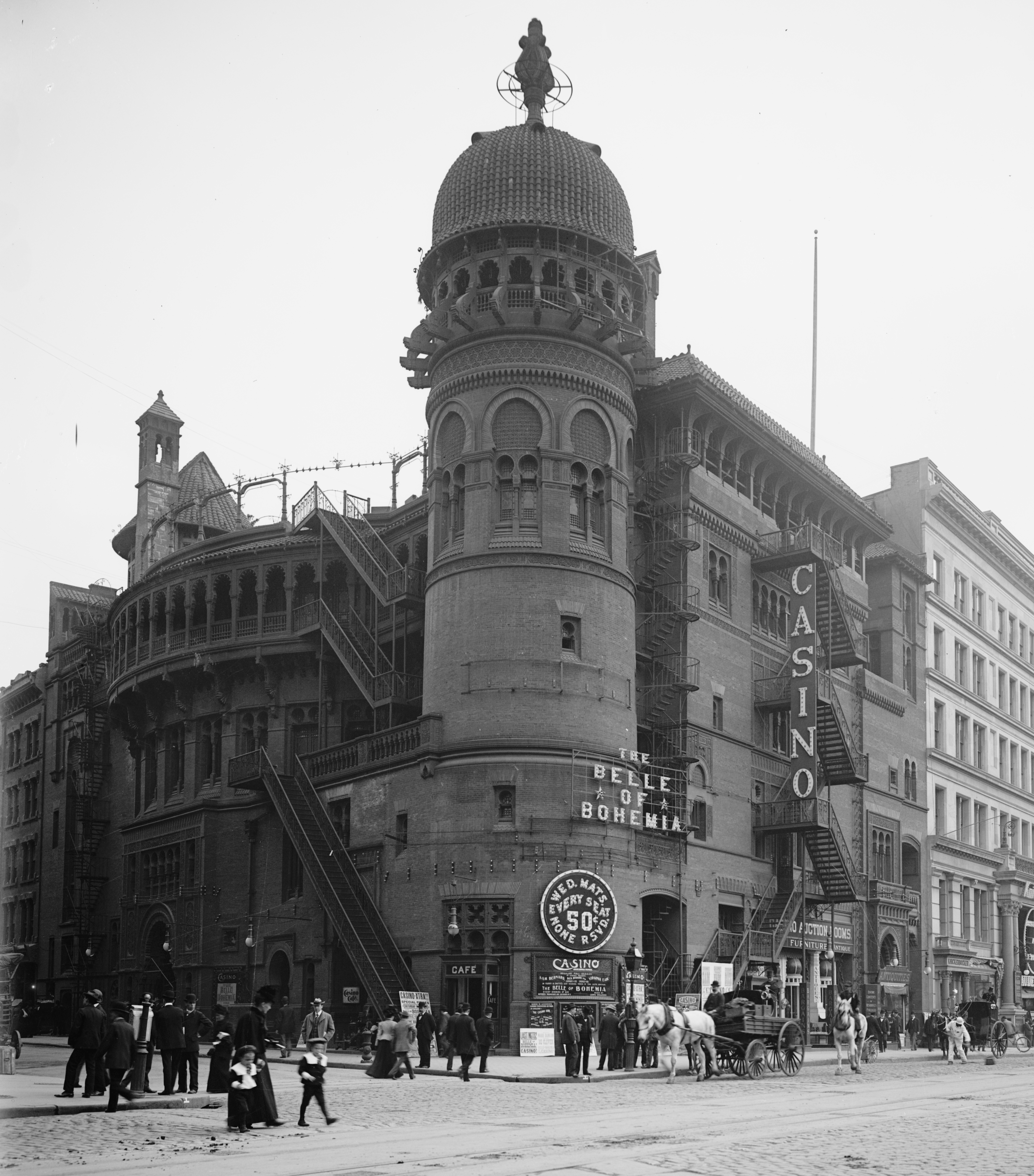
The Casino Theatre in New York during run of The Belle of Bohemia in 1900

The Belle of Bohemia is an Edwardian musical comedy in two acts with music by Ludwig Engländer and Harry Truman MacConnell and lyrics and musical book by Harry B. Smith. The musical opened on Broadway in 1900 before having a run on the West End of London in 1901. It was one of a series of musicals with Belle in the title that were popular on both sides of the Atlantic in the Edwardian era.

== Production ==
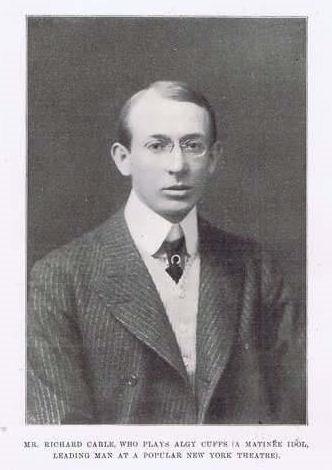
Richard Carle as Algy Cuffs in the London production (1901)

It had been intended that The Belle of Bohemia would open at the Hyperion Theatre in New Haven, Connecticut on 22 September 1900, but the day before its scheduled opening its producer George Lederer found himself in a legal dispute as a result of which four police officers were sent to the Hyperion to ensure the production would not leave New Haven. After some legal maneuvring the production was able to go to New York where it opened at the Casino Theatre on 24 September 1900 and closed on 10 November 1900, having a run of 55 performances. Included in the cast were Lotta Faust, Virginia Earle, Sam Bernard as Adolph Klotz, and also featured Trixie Friganza, Sol Solomon, D. L. Don, Fred Titus and John Hyams (all of whom went on to appear in the London production in the following year) with Marguerite Clark making her Broadway début in the production. The musical was produced by George Lederer with music by Ludwig Engländer and Harry Truman MacConnell to a book by Harry B. Smith and with lyrics by Harry B. Smith in a plot that borrows heavily from Plautus and Shakespeare. The case of mistaken identity in the New York version was helped by the fact that the two leading actors, Dick and Sam Bernard were brothers. Despite the fact that "the costumes were distinctly not up to the Casino average" and some of the road signs in the scenes were misspelt, the show was generally well received.

The Belle of Bohemia was the first production to be staged at the new Apollo Theatre in London on its opening night on 21 February 1901 and starred Marie George, Richard Carle and Marie Dainton. The British premiere on 21 February caused some controversy as it was performed before an invited audience with the first public performance being on the next day - 22 February. This resulted in a small disturbance at the theatre's opening with The Times in particular refusing to write a review of the 'private' performance and went to that the next day explaining that "part of the duty of a newspaper in dealing with theatrical entertainments is to record their reception by the public, and this cannot, of course, be done when the ordinary paying public are not admitted." While The Guardian commented that "it is to be regretted that so elegant a building should have opened its doors to the public with an entertainment of such inferior calibre" During the run the show was 'overhauled with manifest advantage' resulting in The Belle of Bohemia managing a run of 72 performances until 10 May 1900.

== Synopsis ==
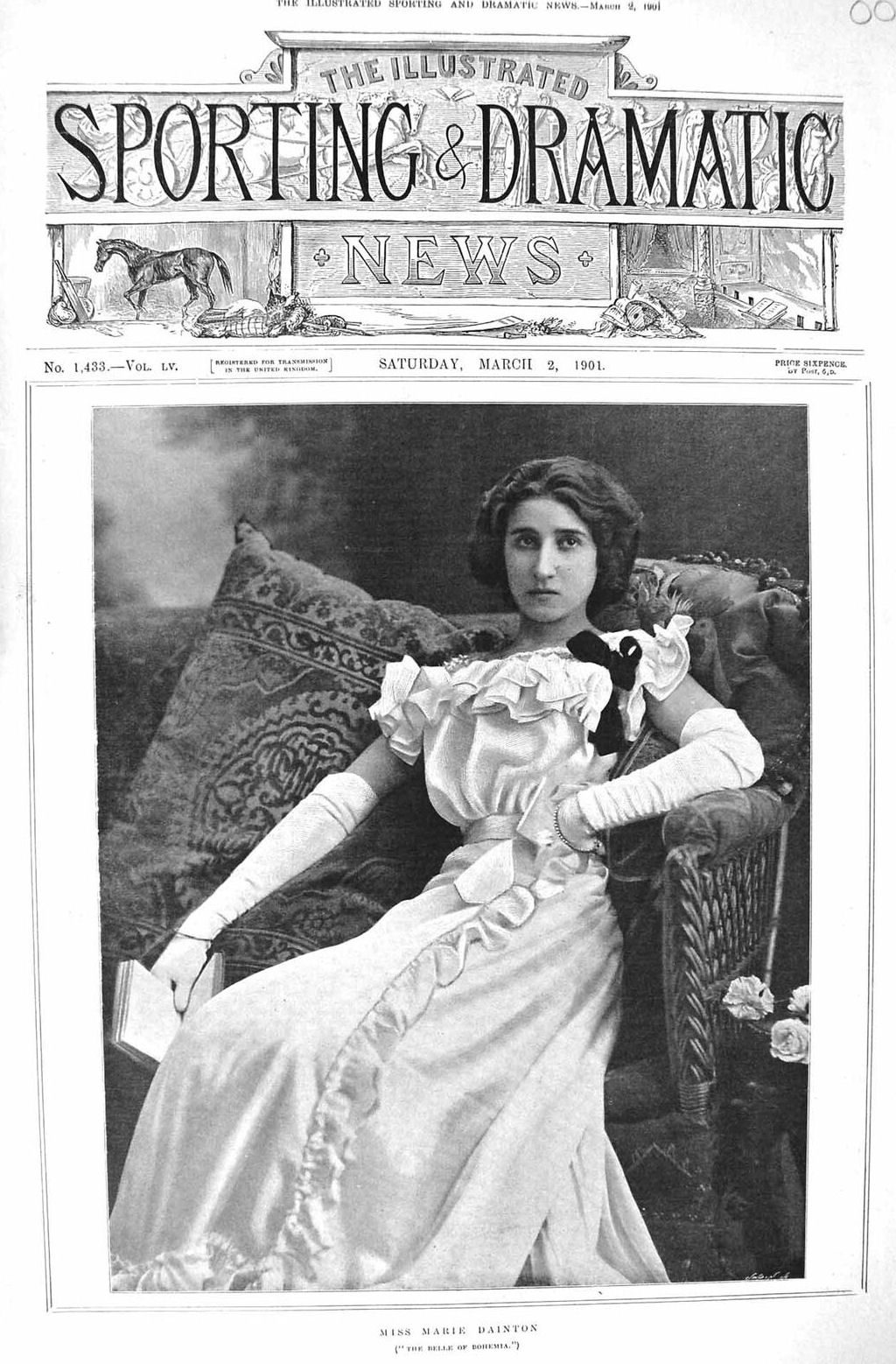
Marie Dainton as Paquita in the London production (1901)

Smith based The Belle of Bohemia on Plautus's Menaechmi with its case of mistaken identity.

- Act I – Klotz's Tin-Type Gallery at Coney Island
- Act II:
- Scene I – Dinkelhauser's Villa at Newport, Rhode Island
- Scene II – Garden of Same
- Scene III: Chateau in Switzerland

Adolph Klotz, a Coney Island photographer, is married to Katie, a singer. Klotz bears a striking resemblance to Rudolph Dinkelhauser, a prosperous brewer. When Klotz commits misdeeds while drunk Dinkelhauser is blamed in a case of mistake identity and is thrown in jail. Klotz manages to set himself up in Dinkelhauser's mansion in Newport. Each of the men pretends to be the husband of the other's wife, which causes confusion. Adding to this, local politician Phelim McDuffy and his 'matinee girl' daughter Geraldine try to cheat Dinkelhauser out of a Swiss chateau he has inherited from his uncle. When all the cast journey to Switzerland all the identities are corrected and Dinkelhauser saves his chateau.

== Musical numbers ==
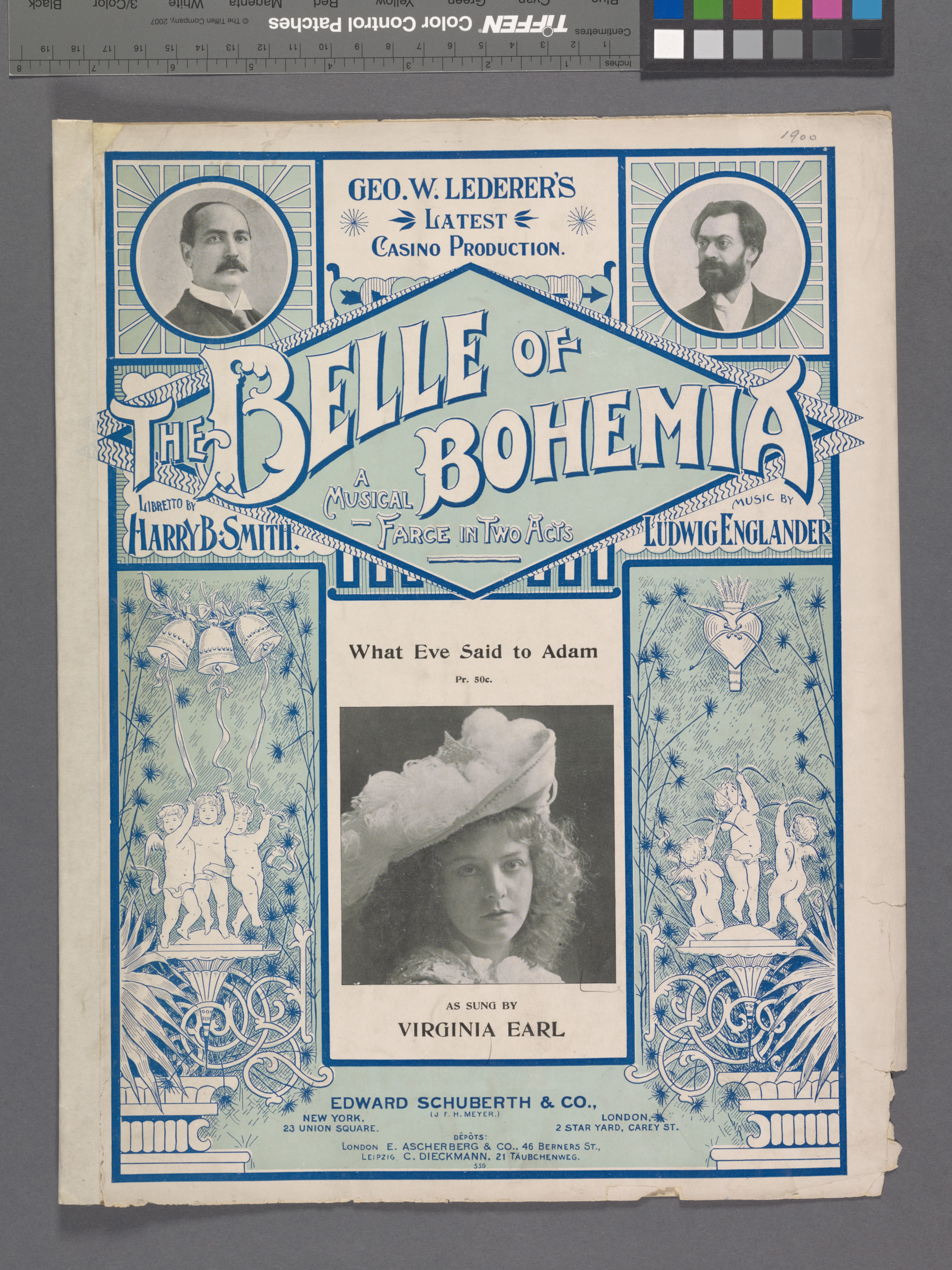
Sheet music cover for 'What Eve Said to Adam' - sung by Virginia Earle in the American production

- The Amateur Entertainer
- Be Clever
- Beer, Beautiful Beer
- The Fairies Lullaby
- The Girl Who Is Up to Date
- The Matinee Girl
- Never Again
- Only in Dreams
- My Lady in the Moon
- What Eve Said to Adam – Katie
- The Wishing Cap
- He Was a Married Man' – Adolph Klotz
- My Mobile Gal
- She Never Loved a Man as Much as That

The score consisted of waltzes, 'coon songs', love songs and a wide range of other musical types.

== New York cast ==
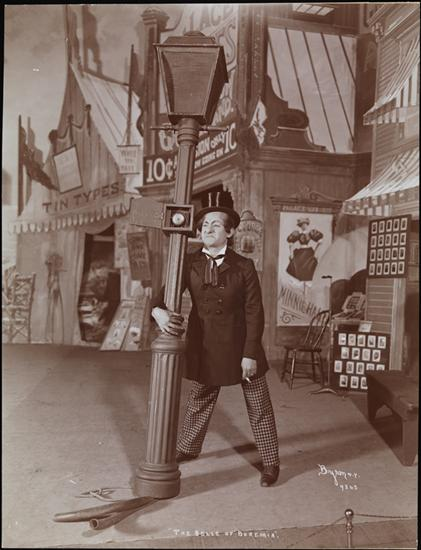
Sam Bernard as Adolph Klotz in the New York production (1900)

- Rudolph Dinkelhauser (A Brewer) – Dick Bernard
- Adolph Klotz (A Wandering Photographer) – Sam Bernard
- Algy Cuffs (A Matinee Idol, leading man at a popular New York Theatre) – Paul F. Nicholson Jr.
- Yellowplush (Dinkelhauser's English Valet) – Frederick Solomon
- Arris – Sol Solomon
- Holligan – Fred Titus
- Mrs. Muggins – Trixie Friganza
- Katie – Virginia Earle
- Camembert – Otto Heilig
- Phelim McDuffy – D. L. Don
- Geraldine McDuffy – Irene Bentley

== London cast ==
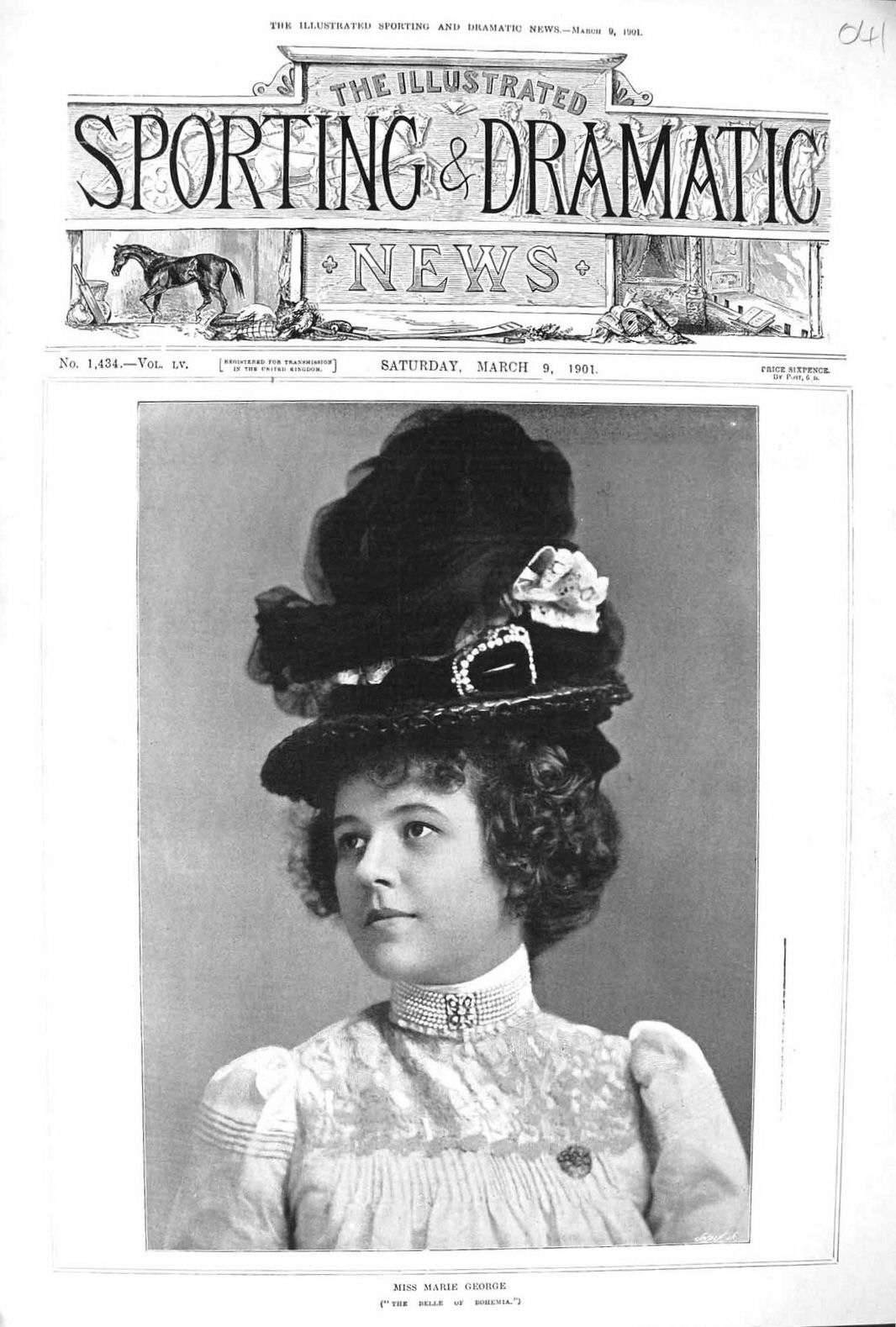
Marie George as Katie in the London production (1901)

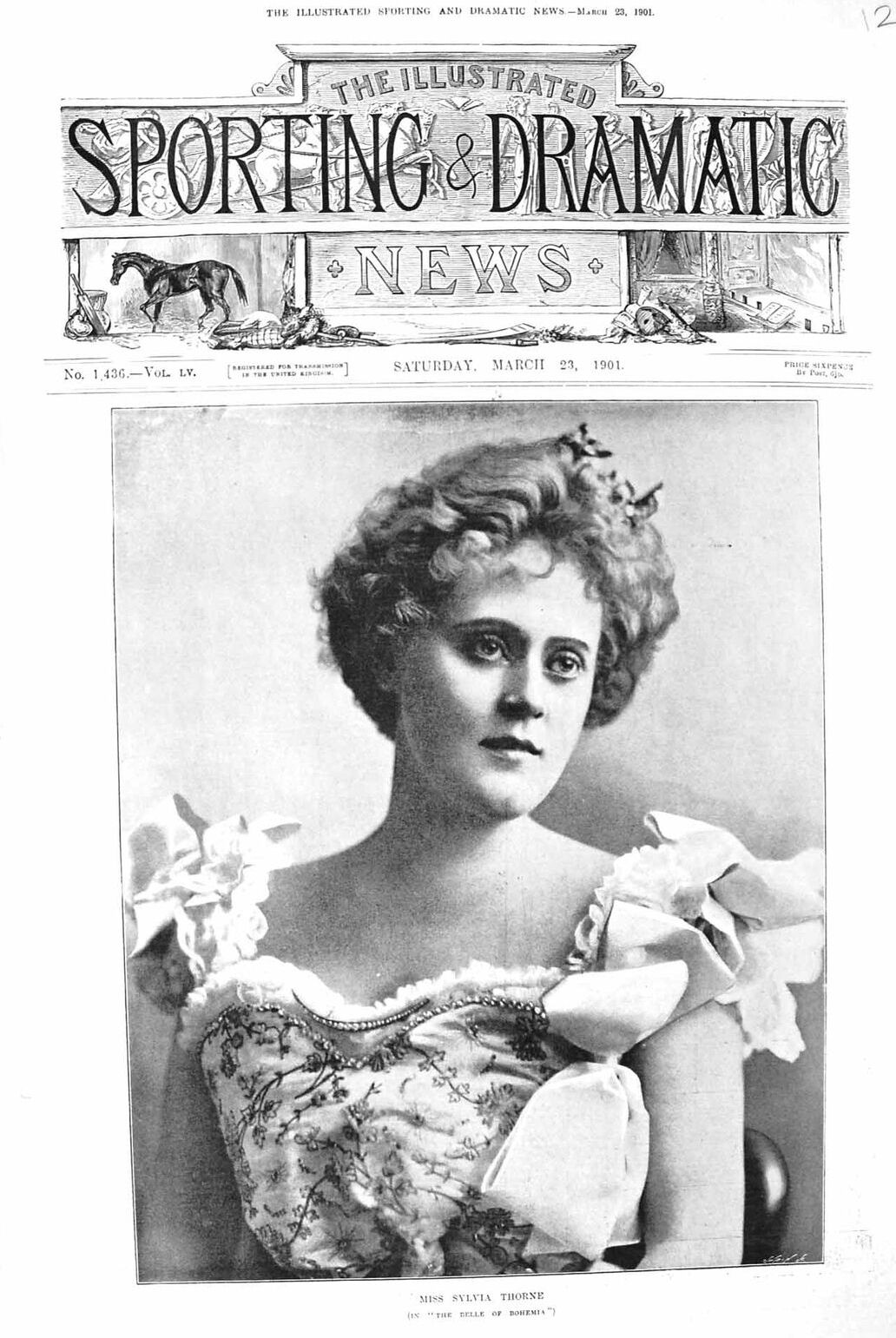
Sylvia Thorne as Mamie in the London production (1901)

- Rudolph Dinkelhauser (A Brewer) – Dave Lewis
- Adolph Klotz (A Wandering Photographer) – D. L. Don
- Dolphin Shark (An Influential Politician and Lawyer) – George A. Schiller
- Yellowplush (Dinkelhauser's English Valet) – Charles A. Maynard
- Chick Riley (The Pride of the Bowery) – John Hyams
- Dr. Pilsbury (A Veterinary Surgeon) – James A. Furey
- Ludwig Dollar (Solo Cornetist) – Sol Solomon
- Holligan (Two of the Finest) – Fred Titus
- Mulligan (Two of the Finest) – Joseph Sullivan
- Algy Cuffs (A Matinee Idol, leading man at a popular New York Theatre) – Richard Carle
- Katie (Wife of Klotz, and a Serio-Comic Singer known as Mlle. Clarisse) – Marie George
- Paquita (Formerly Spanish Dancer, Wife of Dinkelhauser) – Marie Dainton
- Angelica Shark (A Matinee Girl) – Anna Laughlin
- Mamie (Otherwise La Sahara, a Snake Charmer and Fortune Teller) – Sylvia Thorne
- Chloe (Nurse to Dinkelhauser) – Trixie Friganza

Matinee Girls:

- Sadie Stuyvesant – Vashti Earle
- Mamie Livingstone – Ruby Jay
- Carrie Van Courtlandt – Lou Middleton
- Daisy Manhattan – Cecilia Rohda
- Laura Astergill – Jessie Banks
- Hattie Van Tiviller – Lulu Shepherd
- Nettie Rubygold – Don Kersley
- Myrtle Claremont – Mildred Devere
