= Pa (play) =

Farce-musical comedy in three acts by Cal Wallace

Pa is a farce-musical comedy in three acts by playwright Cal Wallace that was originally performed by the Sol Smith Russell Company. The play made its New York premier at the Standard Theatre on February 14, 1887.

== Synopsis ==
Boston Daily Globe, December 28, 1886

“Pa” is a widower and wears a wig. He has three daughters, the eldest of whom has reached the rather advanced age, for a marriageable daughter, of 35. The next in line is 30. The youngest, still in short clothing is 17. “Pa” is possessed of the laudable ambition of providing his daughters with wealthy husbands. In order to scale down the age of the eldest to a marketable tenderness, the youngest is forced to remain a baby and confine herself to dolls and the “Chatterbox.” Pa’s only income seems to be the interest on the $20,000 left to a dog, of which he is the administrator. Consequently, when the millionaire father of Sydney Bumps expresses a wish that his son should unite himself with one of Pa’s daughters, Pa makes the effort to forward the contract. Successive endeavors to unite young Bumps, who is a farcical cross between a country bumpkin and an idiot, to the eldest and the next in line are unsuccessful. Pa’s troubles come to an end, however, when the rustic child of fortune elopes with the baby.

== Review ==
The Toronto Daily Mail, February 4, 1887

Sol Smith Russell is a general favourite wherever he goes and his engagements are invariably successful ones. Toronto is no exception to the rule and always turns out good audiences to see and hear him. Last evening the Grand Opera House was well filled with an audience that went away delighted with Mr. Russell’s new comedy “Pa” by Cal Wallace. The play is a highly amusing one, somewhat of the farcical order, witty in dialogue and full of comical situations. It portrays the adventures of an old gentleman, Perkimen Guinney or “Pa,” who has three daughters, two marriageable and one who thinks she is. “Pa” is the legal guardian of a dog to which a small fortune was bequeathed by its owner, and he seeks to add to his pecuniary advantage in this respect by marrying one of his daughters to a loony medical student whose father is millionaire. Many absurd situations arise out of this scheme and “Pa” finds himself as a rule, in a sea of difficulties, which however, he safely crosses in the end, and all is happiness and joy. It is needless to say that Mr. Russell is the life of the piece, and those who have seen him before need not be told that while he is on stage the house is kept in continual laughter. His comicalities are never exaggerated, but they never fail to excite the utmost merriment. His power of facial expression is wonderful and the imitations which he gave were very true to nature. A recitation of a rural idyll also was enthusiastically applauded, and his songs met with equal favour. It may safely be said that the quaint humour of Mr. Russell’s acting is inimitable. His company is a very good one. The four ladies take their parts well, as do the gentleman. Miss Emma Hagger’s dancing won her an encore, and Frank Lawton proved himself wonderfully agile in the same line. The whistling of the latter with banjo accompaniment brought down the house. “Pa” is very funny and should draw crowded houses. It will be repeated this evening and at both performances to-morrow.

== Cast ==
- Perkimen Guinney (Pa): Sol Smith Russell
- Beatrice Guinney: Emma Hagger
- Hope Guinney: Virginia Nelson
- Sybil Guinney: Emily Bancker
- Raymond Dawsey: Fred Percy Marsh
- Spartacus Hubbs: Frank Lawton
- Sydney Bumps: Fred P. Ham
- Capt. Startle: Albert H. Warren
- Mrs. Rymer: Mattie Ferguson
