= Wheel of Fate (film) =

1953 film

- Directed by: Francis Searle
- Written by: Guy Elmes
- Based on: Nightmare by Alex Atkinson
- Produced by: Francis Searle
- Starring: Patric Doonan; Sandra Dorne; Bryan Forbes
- Cinematography: Reg Wyer
- Edited by: Vera Campbell
- Music by: Temple Abady
- Production company: Kenilworth Film Productions
- Distributed by: General Film Distributors
- Release date: 3 August 1953
- Running time: 72 minutes
- Country: United Kingdom
- Language: English

Wheel of Fate is a 1953 British second feature ('B') drama film directed by Francis Searle and starring Patric Doonan, Sandra Dorne and Bryan Forbes. It was written by Guy Elmes based on the story "Nightmare" by Alex Atkinson. It was released by Rank's General Film Distributors.

A man turns to crime to raise the money he needs to spend time with the woman he loves.

== Plot ==
Two brothers working in their father's repair garage, quiet sensible Johnny and the younger and wilder Ted, fall out when Ted brings home Lucky, a beautiful dance hall singer. The brothers feud when she unexpectedly falls for Johnny, and crime and mayhem ensue.

== Cast ==
- Patric Doonan as Johnny Burrows
- Sandra Dorne as Lucky Price
- Bryan Forbes as Ted Reid
- John Horsley as Detective Sergeant Simpson
- Johnnie Schofield as Len Bright
- Martin Benson as Riscoe
- Cyril Smith as Perce
- Bernard Rebel
- Fred Griffiths
- Michael McCarthy
- Bartlett Mullins
- Frederick Treves

== Production ==
The film was shot at Riverside Studios in London with sets designed by the art director Wilfred Arnold.

== Reception ==
The Monthly Film Bulletin wrote: "'The most convincing things in this flat little crime story are Johnny's sketches and the old, paralysed father, neither of which appears on the screen."

In British Sound Films: The Studio Years 1928–1959 David Quinlan rated the film as "poor", writing: "A low-point even of British 'B's of the 1950s – alternately ludicrous and depressing." Chibnall and McFarlane in The British 'B' Film called the film: "an entertainingly gritty piece of English noir."
