= Alex Atkinson =

British writer (1916–1962)

Alex Atkinson (1916–1962) was an English journalist, novelist and playwright who is best remembered for his collaborative works with the illustrator Ronald Searle.

== Early life and career ==
He was born in Liverpool, where he began his career as an actor. In 1935 Atkinson's play Ferry Inn was produced at the Liverpool Playhouse. Atkinson gained considerable experience as a repertory actor and began writing for Punch in 1948. In 1950 he ended his acting career to devote his time to writing.

In 1953 Atkinson's play Four Winds was produced at the Phoenix Theatre in London's West End. That same year saw the release of the film Wheel of Fate, which Atkinson co-wrote with Guy Elmes.

In 1958 The Big City or the New Mayhew was published. Written by Atkinson and illustrated by Ronald Searle, this collection of humorous character studies had appeared previously in Punch. These studies were based upon the journalism of Henry Mayhew, particularly his famous survey London Labour and the London Poor which appeared in the Morning Chronicle newspaper, throughout the 1840s.

Atkinson again collaborated with Ronald Searle in 1959 publishing the humorous book, By the Rocking Chair Across America. The book opened with a statement by Atkinson, "Too Many books about the United States are written by men who have spent only a few weeks in the country. This one is different; it is by a man who has never been there in his life." With the publication of the book, Atkinson moved to America in 1960 to write for Holiday magazine. He remained as Associate editor until his death in 1962.

In his 1957 article 'Over Seventy', P. G. Wodehouse, lamenting the decline of the humorist, wrote, "I want to see an A. P. Herbert on every street corner, an Alex Atkinson in every local."

== Personal life ==
Alex Atkinson was married to Peggy Atkinson who remained in England. Atkinson lived at 308 South Quince Street, Philadelphia, Pennsylvania.

== Selected bibliography ==
- All Next Week (1952)
- Cry for Shadows (1953)
- Exit Charlie (1955)
- The Big City or the New Mayhew (1958)
- USA for Beginners: By Rocking Chair across America (1959)
- Russia for Beginners: By Rocking Chair across Russia (1960)

== Selected filmography ==
- Wheel of Fate (Film, story "Nightmare") (1953)
- Saturday Playhouse (TV Series, 1 episode, writer "Design for Murder") (1958)
- Monitor (TV Series, 1 episode, Commentary "Variations on a Mechanical Theme") (1959)
- Design for Murder (TV Movie, writer) (1961)
