= My Husband and I (1956 TV series) =

1956 British television series

- Genre: Sitcom
- Starring: Evelyn Laye; Frank Lawton; Linda Gray
- Country of origin: United Kingdom
- No. of series: 1
- No. of episodes: 7

Production
- Running time: 30 minutes
- Production company: Associated-Rediffusion

Original release
- Network: ITV
- Release: 20 July – 12 October 1956

My Husband and I was a short-lived black-and-white British sitcom starring Evelyn Laye and her husband Frank Lawton, who played themselves. It ran for seven episodes in 1956. My Husband and I was written by Geoffrey Kerr and James Leasor. It was made for the ITV network by Associated-Rediffusion.

== Cast ==
- Evelyn Laye – Herself
- Frank Lawton – Himself
- Linda Gray – Molly
- Peter Collingwood – Jennings
- Alicia Massy-Beresford – Jane

== Plot ==
My Husband and I was a typical domestic sitcom made for the refined husband and wife team Evelyn Laye and Frank Lawton. As well as typical comedy situations for domestic sitcoms, My Husband and I also featured humorous songs.

== Episodes ==
1. Episode One (20 July 1956)
2. Episode Two (3 August 1956)
3. Episode Three (17 August 1956)
4. Episode Four (31 August 1956)
5. Episode Five (14 September 1956)
6. Episode Six (28 September 1956)
7. Episode Seven (12 October 1956)

All seven episodes were later wiped, and none of them exist in the television archives as of 2026.
