= Sol Smith Russell =

American actor

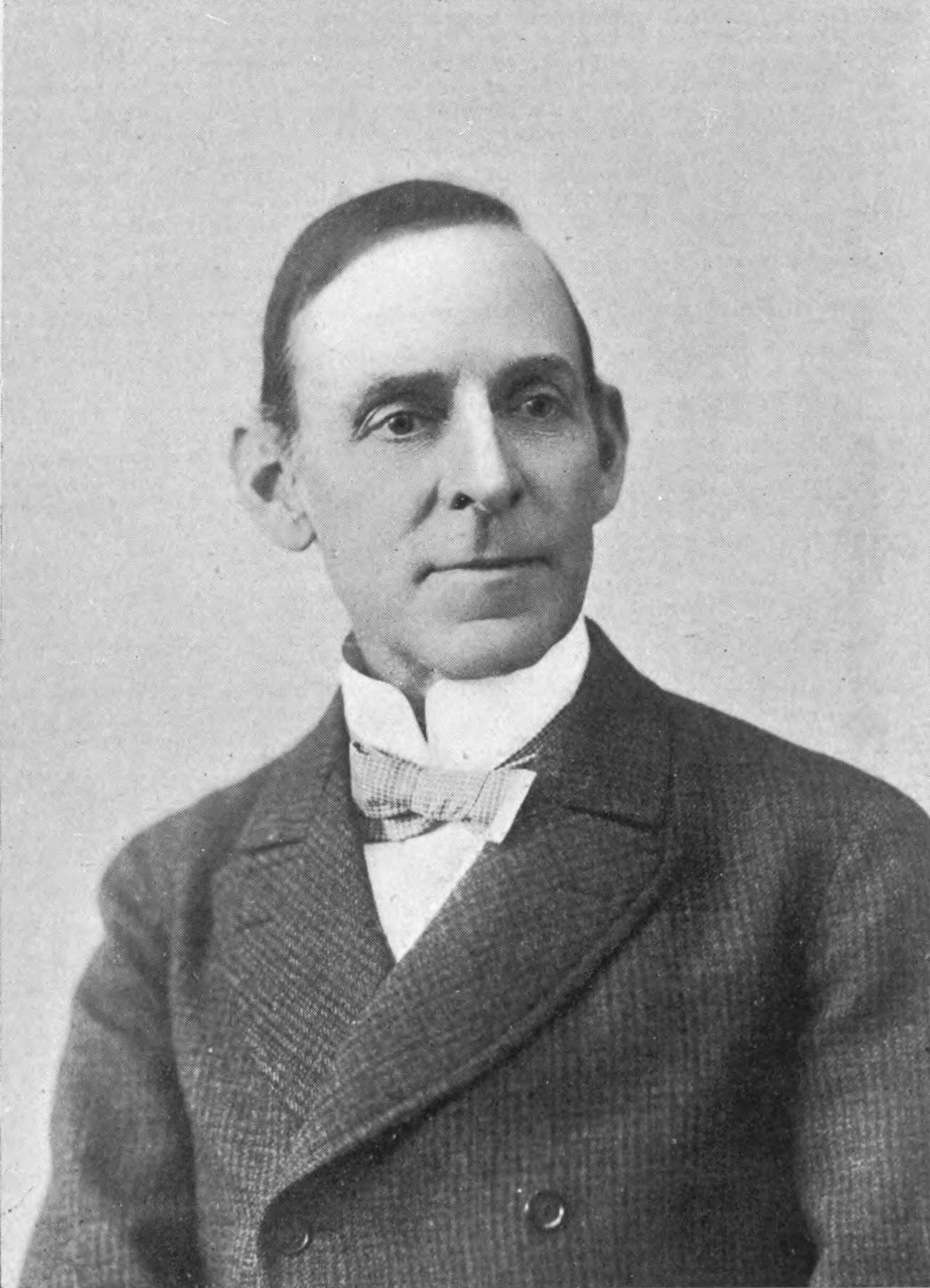
- Born: June 15, 1848; Brunswick, Missouri, U.S.A.
- Died: April 28, 1902 (aged 53); Washington, District of Columbia, USA
- Occupation: Actor

Solomon Smith Russell (June 15, 1848 – April 28, 1902) was a 19th-century American comedic stage actor who began performing as a boy during the American Civil War.

== Early life ==
Russell was born at Brunswick, Missouri, the eldest of two sons and a daughter raised by Charles and Louise (née Mathews) Russell. While a young boy Russell's family moved to St. Louis where his father manufactured and sold tinware. Russell's mother was from Ohio, the daughter of a Cincinnati music teacher. It soon became apparent that Russell did not share his father's talent as a tin maker and that his best option would be to prepare for a college education. Both his parents were very religious and had a prejudice against the theater, even though Russell's uncle, Sol Smith (1801–1869), was a well-known actor and theater manager in St. Louis. This family connection enabled Russell easy access to area theaters watching plays, sometimes from backstage, without his parents' knowledge.

At the age of thirteen, not long after the outbreak of the American Civil War, Russell ran away from home to serve in the Union Army as a drummer boy. He tried to enlist as a musician, but was unable to obtain the required written consent of his parents. Russell soon became popular with the officers and soldiers providing entertainment to break the dull routine of daily camp life. He fell ill while stationed at Paducah, Kentucky, and after being told that he was likely to die managed to return home to St. Louis, where his mother eventually nursed him back to health.

== Career ==
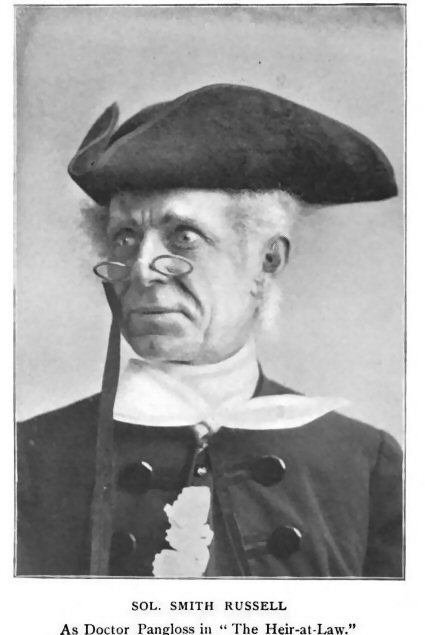
Sol Smith Russell as Dr. Pangloss in The Heir at Law

Transcribed from "Famous Actors of the Day in America" by Lewis Clinton Strang; 1899, pg. 248–260

"My first theatrical engagement was at the Defiance Theatre, Cairo, Illinois, in 1862, at the magnificent salary of six dollars a week," said Mr. Russell. "For this recompense I sang between the acts and played and drummed in the orchestra. I had for a bed the stage lounge, and counted myself lucky to have even so good a place to sleep as that. The manager of the theatre, Mr. Holland, was very kind to me. He took me to his home and gave me free access to his excellent theatrical library, and during such spare time as I had, I read. My first acting was in a play called 'The Hidden Hand,' and my part was that of a negro girl. I made quite a success of it." He was then offered twelve dollars a week if he would learn to walk the slack wire. He accepted and joined "Bob Carter's Dog Show," which traveled on a canal boat. When it was necessary Mr. Russell joined the mules in hauling the craft. His next engagement was at John Bates's National Theatre in Cincinnati, where he sang between the acts, and after that he was a stock actor and a singer in Deagle's Theatre, St. Louis. Then he played in Milwaukee, later becoming connected with the Peake Family Bell Ringers, who followed the army into Arkansas and Tennessee. During the season of 1864–65 Mr. Russell was second comedian in the Nashville Theatre, where Laura Keene and Maggie Mitchell also played, and the following season he was at Ben DeBar's Theatre, St. Louis, with Lawrence Barrett. The fall of 1866 found him visiting some small Western towns and experiencing every variety of hard luck. "Perhaps you'd like to have me tell you of my walk of thirty-six miles on a given occasion, with my wardrobe, tied up in a yellow handkerchief, under my arm," Mr. Russell remarked; "of my offering to give an entertainment, single-handed and alone, in a town,—one of the small towns of the region,—for which exhibition of my talents the boys of the place drove me into the river and pummeled me to their evident delight and satisfaction; of my subsisting for three days on one chicken ; of my arriving at the little town of Meredosia, Illinois, where there was no printing-office; of my taking one old handbill from my bundle, and, procuring a bell, going about the village and arousing the inhabitants, taking my bill from house to house, from store to store, and showing my program, and then, when evening came, exhibiting my abilities and talents to a house' whose receipts brought me, all told, exactly sixty-five cents! But after all this was a good house for me at that particular time.

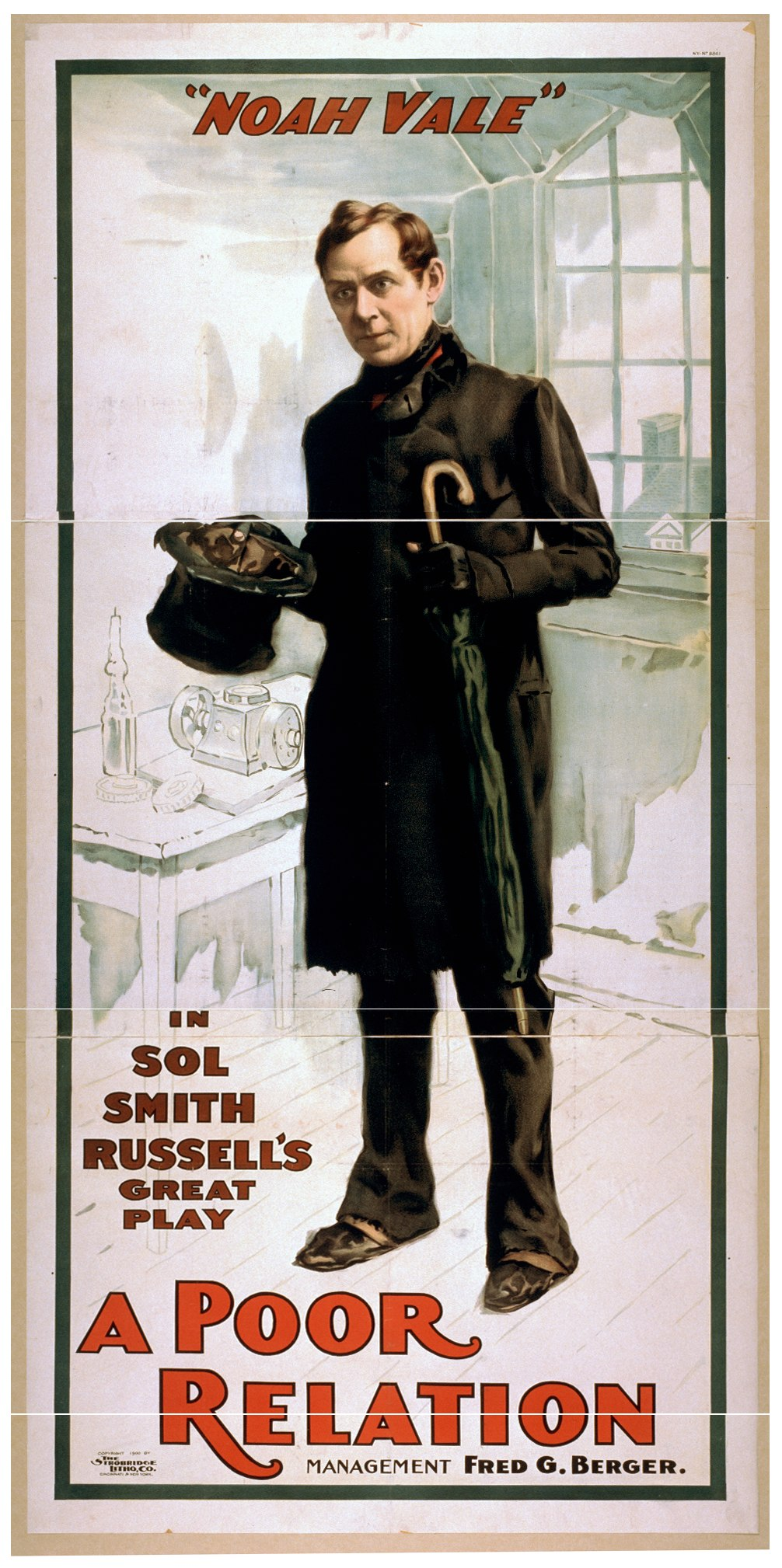
1900 poster of Sol Smith Russell in A Poor Relation, later adapted for a 1921 film starring Will Rogers

Often I avoided hall hire, sang in the open air, and took up a collection; and on a certain occasion I added the sale of eye-water, at ten cents a bottle, to my entertainment without any noticeable increase of receipts." Mr. Russell first came East with the Berger Family, and his impersonations of eccentric characters and imitations of John B. Grough attracted considerable attention. During 1867 he was connected with the stock company of William E. Sinn's Arch Street Theatre, Philadelphia, of which James E. Murdock was the leading actor. The next three years were spent as a monologue entertainer in variety theatres in New England and elsewhere. Mr. Russell's first appearance in New York was in 1871, at Lina Edwin's Theatre. He was then engaged for the Olympic Theatre, New York, of which James Duff, the father-in-law of Augustin Daly, was then manager. The stock company, which regularly played at the Olympic Theatre, was an unusually large one, and included a ballet corps and a numerous chorus. Two or three different plays were given every night; and sometimes, during the same evening, Mr. Russell was called upon to appear as a ballet girl in one piece and to impersonate one of the bearded ruffians in the next. The late James Lewis, formerly of Daly's Theatre, was also a member of the company.

In 1874, Mr. Russell joined Augustin Daly's company, making his first appearance, on August 24, as Mr. Peabody in "What Could She Do? or Jealousy." He left the organization after one season, but rejoined it again in 1876. While with Mr. Daly he played Trip in "The School for Scandal", Colander in "Masks and Faces", and like characters. Mr. Russell first appeared as a star in 1880. He opened in Buffalo in "Edgewood Folks", a piece written for him by J. E. Brown, of Boston, especially to display his peculiar abilities as a character impersonator and entertainer, Mr. Russell's specialties being made a prominent feature.

"I organized the best company, in the way of support, that I could gather, including several members of Wallack's stock company," said Mr. Russell. "I made a great effort, looking to splendid success. Our company played thirty-eight weeks with varying fortunes; indeed, with small luster and little profit. But the following season was good; the third better still, and, at the end of the fifth year the play in question—'Edgewood Folks'—had made my reputation as a 'drawing' star."

Then on the retirement of William Warren in 1885 from the Boston Museum, Mr. Russell succeeded him as leading comedian, but in 1886 he resumed his starring tours, bringing out "Felix McKusick," by J. E. Brown. In 1887 he produced "Pa;" in 1887 "Bewitched," by Edward Kidder; in 1889 "A Poor Relation," by the same author; "The Tale of a Coat," by Dion Boucicault, in 1890. Since then "Peaceful Valley," "April Weather," a revival of "The Heir at Law," "A Bachelor's Romance," and "Hon. John Grigsby" have shown him at his best. Mr. Russell's home is in Minneapolis, and his wife is the daughter of the late William T. Adams, known to boy readers as "Oliver Optic."

== Death ==
Russell died at the Richmond Hotel in Washington, D.C., on April 28, 1902, after suffering several strokes. He was survived by his wife and daughter, both named Alice, and son Thomas.

"Sol Smith Russell's smile was as near to human sunshine as anyone's smile can be. Those who saw him as Noah Vale or as Hosea Howe, will never forget his quaint, genial, captivating, winning smile. My association with him, at a critical period in his stage career, resulted not only in material prosperity for both of us, but gave me for all time, cherished memories of a delightful comradeship which can never be forgotten." Edward E. Kidder (playwright)
