= Elise de Vère =

British actress and model (1879–1966)

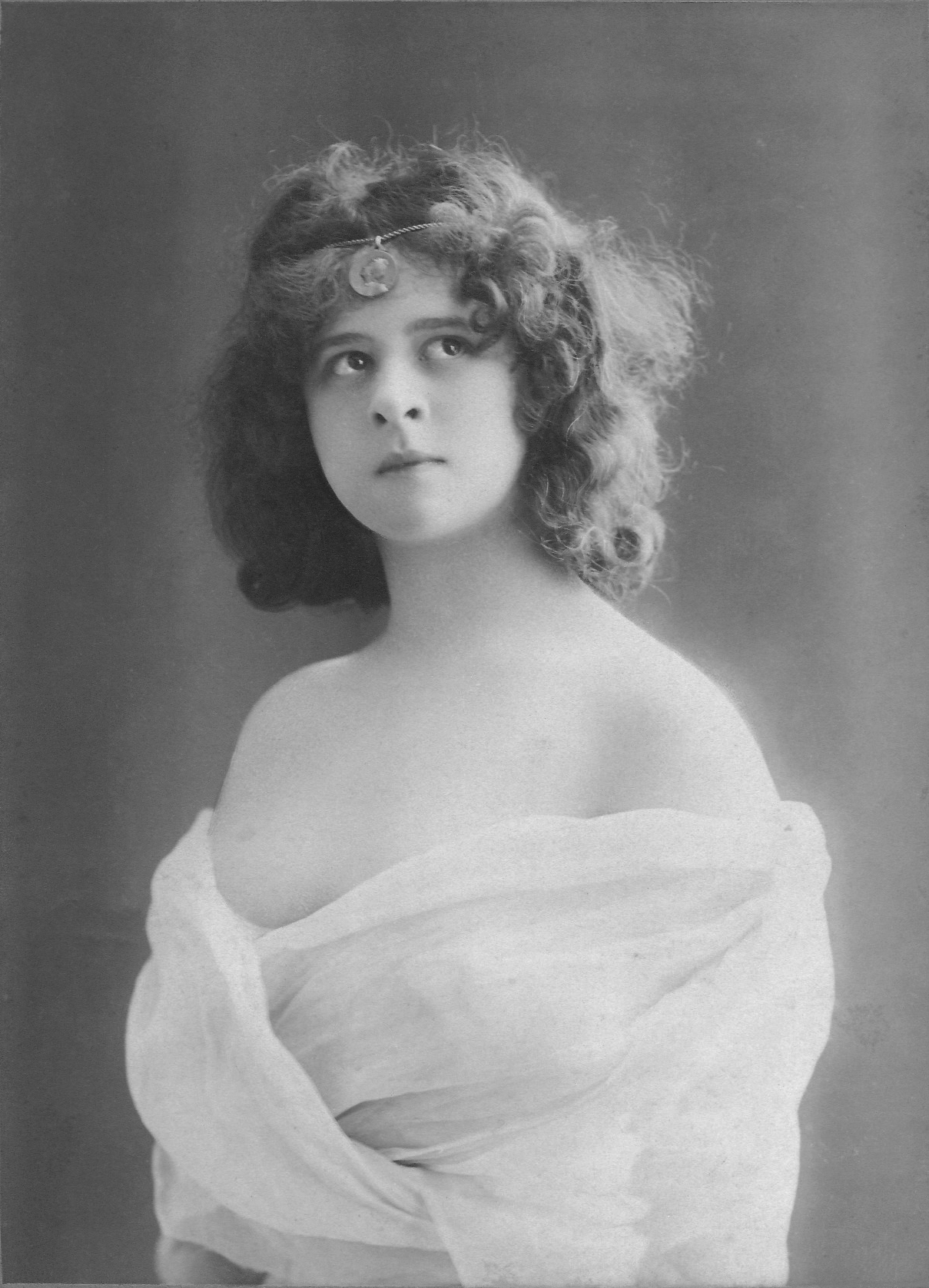
- Portrait of Elise de Vère by Léopold-Émile Reutlinger
- Born: Constance Elise de Vère; 1879; Brussels, Belgium
- Died: 8 November 1966 (aged 86–87); Switzerland
- Other name: Miss de Vère
- Occupations: Actress; Model; Dancer; Singer
- Years active: 1894 – 1918
- Spouse: Frank Joseph Goldsoll (m. 1917; died 1934)
- Relatives: Clementine de Vere (sister)

Constance Elise de Vère (1879 – November 8, 1966), known professionally as Elise de Vère, was a British-born stage actress, singer, dancer, and early cinema pioneer who achieved widespread prominence in France and the United States during the Belle Époque. Celebrated as a premier chanteuse excentrique (eccentric singer) and operatic soubrette, she performed in renowned music halls across Europe before starring on Broadway. She is also recognized for her collaboration with cinema pioneer Georges Méliès in one of the earliest silent films ever made.

Following her marriage to the highly influential and controversial multi-millionaire corporate investor Frank Joseph Godsol in 1917, she permanently retired from the stage. Her later life connected her to the corporate boardroom maneuvers that ultimately birthed Metro-Goldwyn-Mayer (MGM).

== Early life and family dynasty ==
Constance Elise de Vère was born into an international show-business family heavily entrenched in the late 19th-century theatrical and illusionist communities. She was one of eight children born to British and French parents. Elise's father Charles de Vère (born Herbert Shakespeare Gardiner Williams), an elite English professional magician. After establishing successful hubs in Brussels, he moved the family to Paris in 1892 to open a famous conjuring supply shop, supplying magic apparatus, early electrical systems, and pioneering film equipment and her mother Julia de Vère (née Ferrett), a celebrated stage performer in her own right. Under the stage name Okita, she became the first Western woman to perform a dedicated "Oriental magic" illusion act, frequently gracing the stage of the historic Théâtre Robert-Houdin alongside Georges Méliès.

Her brother, Cyrille "Cyril" de Vère, chose a path in engineering and motorsports, later becoming a celebrated French racing driver and receiving the appointment of Chevalier de la Légion d'honneur in 1926. Her sister, Clementine de Vere, achieved global stardom under the moniker Ionia ("The Goddess of Mystery"), headlining massive, multi-ton international magic illusions. Her other sister, Caroline (Carrie) and brother Camille, were also active in the family's artistic and theatrical network.

== Career ==
=== Rise to fame and european stage ===
Growing up in Paris, de Vère naturally transitioned into public performance. Her early career spanned dance and experimental early film.

=== Collaboration with Georges Méliès ===
In 1896, de Vère collaborated with legendary film director Georges Méliès. She starred as the dancer in the silent short Miss de Vère (English Jig) (Miss de Vère (gigue anglaise)), which was assigned catalog number 45 by Méliès's Star Film Company. While the original celluloid film print is considered lost, fragments of her energetic British jig performance survived historically through a mass-market flipbook (folioscópio) produced by Léon Beaulieu around 1896–1897.

=== The Belle Époque "Stage Diva" ===
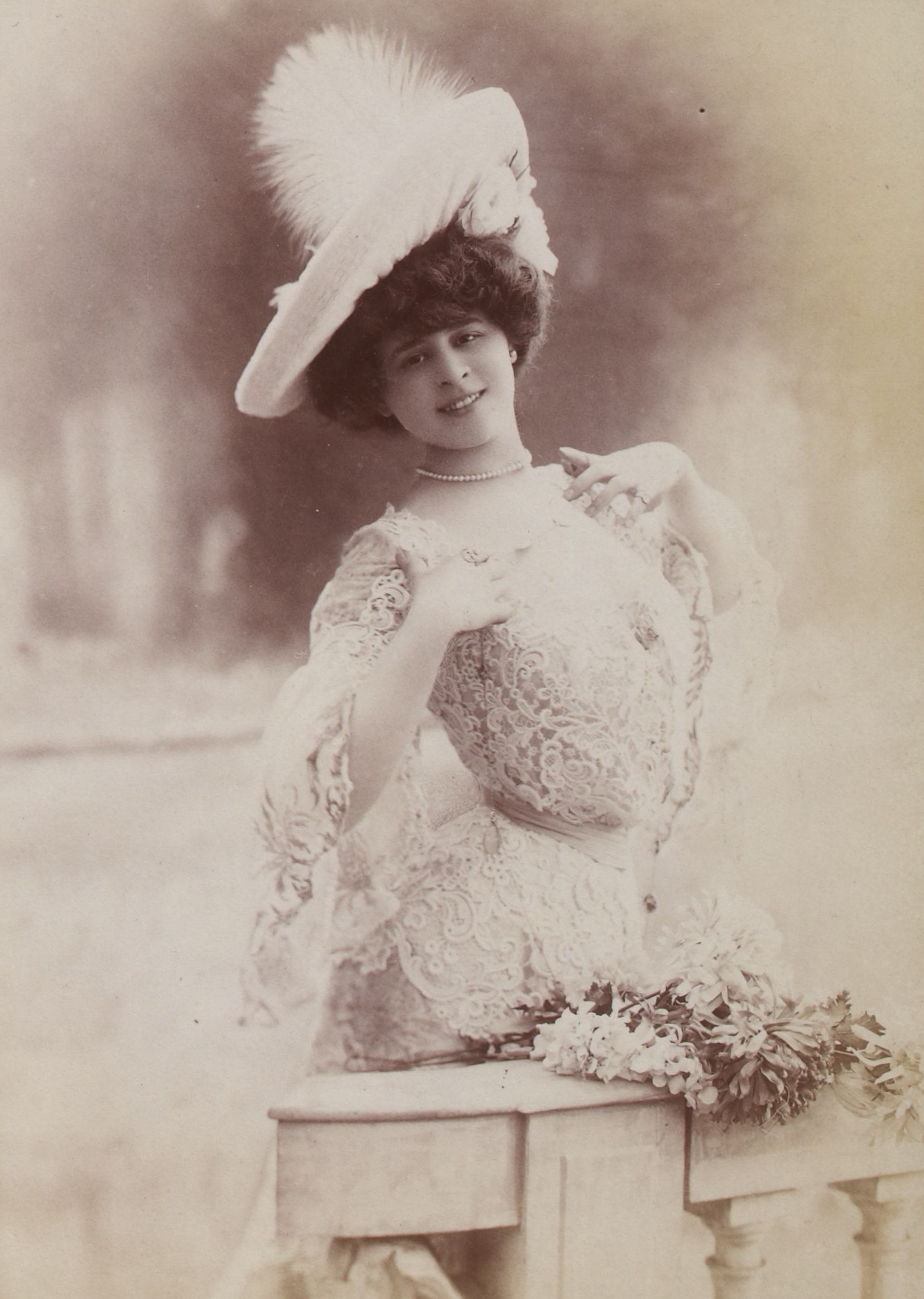
Elise de Vère as Miss de Vère in 1896

By the late 1890s, de Vère had evolved into an iconic fixture of the Parisian nightlife scene. Her career hit a major breakthrough in 1899 when she won second place in the high-profile Gil Blas beauty contest held at the Paris Olympia Theatre.

The French press frequently characterized her as a chanteuse excentrique, leading to headlining slots at premier venues like the Théâtre des Folies-Marigny. Her striking beauty made her a highly sought-after subject for celebrity photographers of the era. She famously modeled for the legendary Léopold-Émile Reutlinger studio at 21 Boulevard des Italiens, resulting in a series of daring, "risqué" cabinet cards published in 1899 that were distributed to fans across Europe.

=== American Transatlantic Success and Broadway ===
In 1903, theatrical impresario Florenz Ziegfeld Jr. recruited de Vère to make her American debut in the grand romantic comic opera Red Feather. When she arrived in New York City, The New York Times noted with surprise that despite her deep professional ties to Paris, she spoke flawless English—a nod to her British lineage that American media often overlooked. The press also noted her versatile linguistic talent, highlighting that she had recently trained to sing in German.

Red Feather premiered on Broadway at the Lyric Theatre on November 9, 1903, running for 60 performances before moving to the Grand Opera House in April 1904. Staged by Joseph W. Herbert and Max Figman, the production featured music by Reginald De Koven.

De Vère was cast as Mlle. Fifine, serving as the production's primary comedic soubrette. Her character—traditionally a light-hearted, vain, and mischievous archetype—was a major hit with audiences. She commanded several crucial numbers, including The Little Milliner, Mo Tichi-tit, and Lessons in Verse a comedic quartet performed alongside theatrical star Thomas Q. Seabrooke.

=== Retirement and later life ===
Through her husband, de Vère became connected to early Hollywood history. Godsol aggressively invested in Goldwyn Pictures Corporation, eventually staging a massive corporate coup in 1922 that ousted founder Samuel Goldwyn and placed Godsol in the president's chair. Godsol used this position to orchestrate the legendary 1924 three-way merger combining Metro Pictures, Goldwyn Pictures, and Louis B. Mayer Productions into Metro-Goldwyn-Mayer (MGM).

Following the massive financial windfall from the MGM merger, Elise and her husband withdrew from the public eye. They relocated back to Europe, maintaining an immensely private, wealthy lifestyle away from the entertainment industry.

== Personal life ==
On December 8, 1917, de Vère married multi-millionaire corporate opportunist and investor Frank Joseph Godsol (Goldsoll) in Newark, New Jersey. Upon her marriage, she permanently retired from the theatre, trading her public career for a private life in global high society.

== Death ==
Following Godsol's death, Elise spent her remaining decades living quietly in Switzerland, where she died in November 1966 at the age of 87.

== Filmography ==
=== Film ===
Year	Title	Role	Notes
1896	Miss de Vère (English Jig)	Miss de Vère	Debut
1899	Miss de Vere, 1er prix de beauté, Concours 1899	Miss de Vère	

=== Stage ===
Year	Title	Role(s)	Venue(s)	Notes
1903	Red Feather	Mlle	Lyric Theatre	
1904	Red Feather	Mlle	Grand Opera House	
