= Joseph Smith (dancer) =

American dancer and choreographer

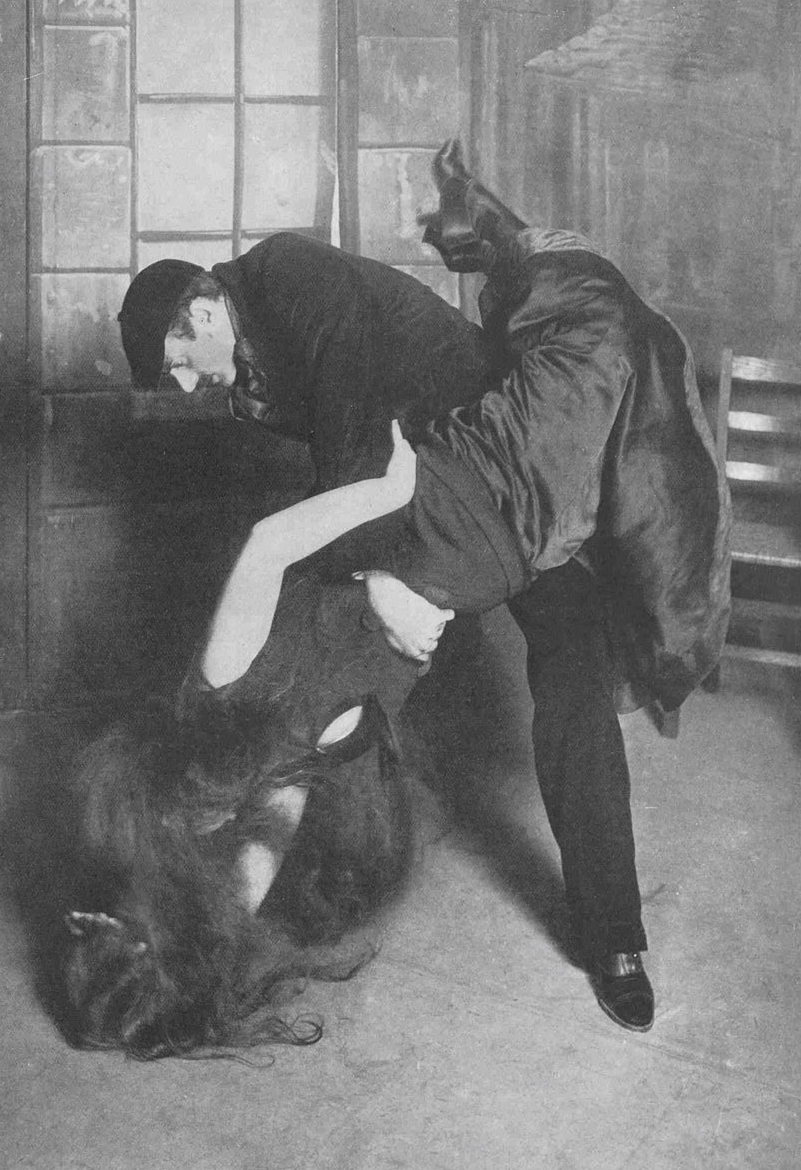
Joseph C. Smith and Louise Alexander dancing the Apache dance in the 1908 Broadway musical, "The Queen of the Moulin Rouge."

Joseph C. Smith (1875–1932) was an American dancer, musical theatre actor, and choreographer. He introduced tango to the United States in 1911. In a letter to the New York Times he claimed that he introduced it at the Winter Garden Theatre, dancing with Dorothy Jardon, in the show called Review of 1911. He was the son of George Washington Smith (1820-1899), America's first male ballet star.

== Early life and career ==
Joseph C. Smith was born in 1875; one of ten children born to the American ballet dancer George Washington Smith. Against the wishes of his mother, Smith was trained by his father as a dancer and actor; learning ballet and skills in stage combat and the art of the harlequin. He also was an accomplished horseman, and became proficient in trick riding. He began his career as a ballet dancer in Europe, ultimately performing in classical ballets at La Scala in Milan and on the London stage.

After returning to America, Smith was a choreographer for Broadway from 1902 through 1914. The first show he choreographed was the musical The Show Girl, or The Cap of Fortune which premiered at Wallack's Theatre on May 5, 1902. Some of the other productions he choreographed included the opera Red Feather (1903, Lyric Theatre), the operetta Vera Violetta (1911, Winter Garden Theatre), and the musicals The Sultan of Sulu (1902, Wallack's Theatre), Coming Thro' the Rye (1906, Herald Square Theatre), The Ziegfeld Follies of 1907, The-Merry-Go-Round (1908, Circle Theatre), A Certain Party (1911, Wallack's Theatre) and My Little Friend (1913, New Amsterdam Theatre). The final Broadway musical he choreographed was Victor Herbert's The Only Girl (1914, Lyric Theatre).

Smith was also a musical theatre actor; portraying characters that heavily featured his dancing abilities. He first performed on Broadway as one of the Apache Dancers in the musical The Queen of the Moulin Rouge at the Circle Theatre in 1908-1909. His first character role was as Bobby in the musical Madame Sherry at the New Amsterdam Theatre in 1910-1911. His other Broadway roles included Charles Bigroll in Over the River (1912), I. Ketchum in The Whirl of New York (1921), and Moe Zimmermann in Sidewalks of New York (1927-1928). He was also a featured dancer in the ensemble of several other musicals in the 1910s and 1920s.

== Personal life and death ==
Smith was married to the dancer Frances Demarest. He died in December 1932 in New York City when he was hit by a truck while crossing the street.

== Bibliography ==
- Ruth Benjamin, Arthur Rosenblatt (2006). Who Sang what on Broadway, 1866-1996, Volume 1. McFarland & Company.
- Dan Dietz (2021). The Complete Book of 1910s Broadway Musicals. Rowman & Littlefield Publishers. ISBN 9781538150283.
- John Franceschina (2018). "Joseph C. Smith". Incidental and Dance Music in the American Theatre from 1786 to 1923, Volume 1. BearManor Media.
- H. Thomas Howell (2014). Eleanor's Pursuit: The Marital Misadventure of 1911 That Triggered Sensational Headlines and a High-Stakes Courtroom Battle. Archway Publishing. ISBN 9781480812147.
- Mark Knowles (2009). "Chapter 7. 5. Joseph C. Smith". The Wicked Waltz and Other Scandalous Dances: Outrage at Couple Dancing in the 19th and Early 20th Centuries. McFarland & Company. ISBN 9780786453603.

== See also ==
- Turkey Trot (dance)
- Apache (dance)

== See also ==
- Carlos G. Groppa, The Tango in the United States, a History, McFarland & Company, Jefferson, North Carolina, 2004, ISBN 0-7864-1406-5
