= Julian Mitchell (disambiguation) =

Julien or Julian Mitchell may refer to:

- Julian Mitchell (director) (1852–1926), American theatre director and choreographer
- Julien Mitchell (1888–1954), English film actor, a/k/a Julian Mitchell
- Julian Mitchell (playwright) (born 1935), English playwright, screenwriter and novelist
