= Comin' Thro' the Rye (disambiguation) =

Comin' Thro' the Rye, is a 1782 poem by Robert Burns

The phrase Comin' Thro' the Rye or Coming Thro' the Rye may also refer to:

- Comin' Thro the Rye (film), 1923 British silent drama film directed by Cecil Hepworth
- Coming Thro' the Rye, 1906 musical by George V. Hobart, A. Baldwin Sloane, and J. Sebastian Hiller
- Coming Through the Rye (film), 2015 American film directed by James Steven Sadwith
