= Louise Alexander =

Louise Alexander may refer to:

- Louise Alexander (politician)
- Louise Alexander (dancer)
