= Red Feather (opera) =

1903 comic opera

Red Feather is a comic opera in two acts with music by Reginald De Koven, a libretto by Charles Klein, and lyrics by Charles Emerson Cook.

== Production history ==
Produced by Florenz Ziegfeld Jr., Red Feather premiered on Broadway at the Lyric Theatre on November 9, 1903. It closed at that theatre on January 2, 1904, after 60 performances. The show was remounted at the Grand Opera House in April 1904 for further performances. Louis F. Gottschalk served as musical director for the production and the work was staged by Joseph W. Herbert and Max Figman. Joseph Smith choreographed dances in the show, and the sets were design by Ernest Albert. Caroline Seidle designed the costumes.

Red Feather starred soprano Grace Van Studdiford as Countess Hilda von Draga, a.k.a. "Red Feather", George L. Tallman as Captain Trevors, and Thomas Q. Seabrooke as Baron Bulverstrauss. Others in the cast included Stanley Hawkins as H.R.H. Crown Prince of Romancia, Elise de Vère as Mlle. Fifine, Louis Casavant as Colonel McPatrick, Olive Celeste Moore as Anita, Lillian Sefton as Prada, Margaret Hubbard Ayer as Daphne, and F. Stuart Hyatt as Bagstock Bowler.

== Plot ==
Setting: The fictional town of Romancia and the Castle of Countess von Draga

Countess Hilda von Draga is romantically pursued by both H.R.H. Crown Prince of Romancia and Captain Trevors. Unknown to both men, the Countess has plans to overthrow the monarchy of Romania, and is in fact the mysterious 'male bandit' "Red Feather" whose activities have been troubling the crown. Captain Trevors is tasked with capturing the elusive Red Feather by the Crown Prince, unaware that his target is the woman he loves.

== Classification ==
The published score of Red Feather describes the work as a comic opera in two acts, and the work has an entry in Operas in English: A Dictionary (2013). However, musical theatre scholar Dan Dietz, while noting that the work was described as a "romantic opera" by its creators in interviews, labeled the work as the first "musical" to be performed on the stage of the newly built Lyric Theatre, and overall questioned its description as an opera. In contrast, the Musical Courier critical review at the time of the production had a very different opinion. It stated the following,

"Red Feather is wholly devoid of coarseness. It can not be classed as a 'comic opera'; it is something higher than that. It possesses all the essentials of a romantic opera and is wanting so many of the objectionable features which mar so many of the light operas."

Music historian Richard Traubner included the work as an example of American operetta in his book Operetta: A Theatrical History (2004).

== Bibliography ==
- Brideson, Cynthia; Brideson, Sara (2015). Ziegfeld and His Follies: A Biography of Broadway's Greatest Producer. University Press of Kentucky. ISBN 9780813160900.
- Dietz, Dan (2022). "Red Feather". The Complete Book of 1900s Broadway Musicals. Rowman & Littlefield Publishers. ISBN 9781538168943.
- Margaret Ross Griffel (2013). "Red Feather". Operas in English: A Dictionary. Scarecrow Press. ISBN 9780810883253.
- Richard Traubner (2004). "American operetta". Operetta: A Theatrical History. Taylor & Francis. ISBN 9781135887834.
