= Clementine de Vere =

British illusionist and actor

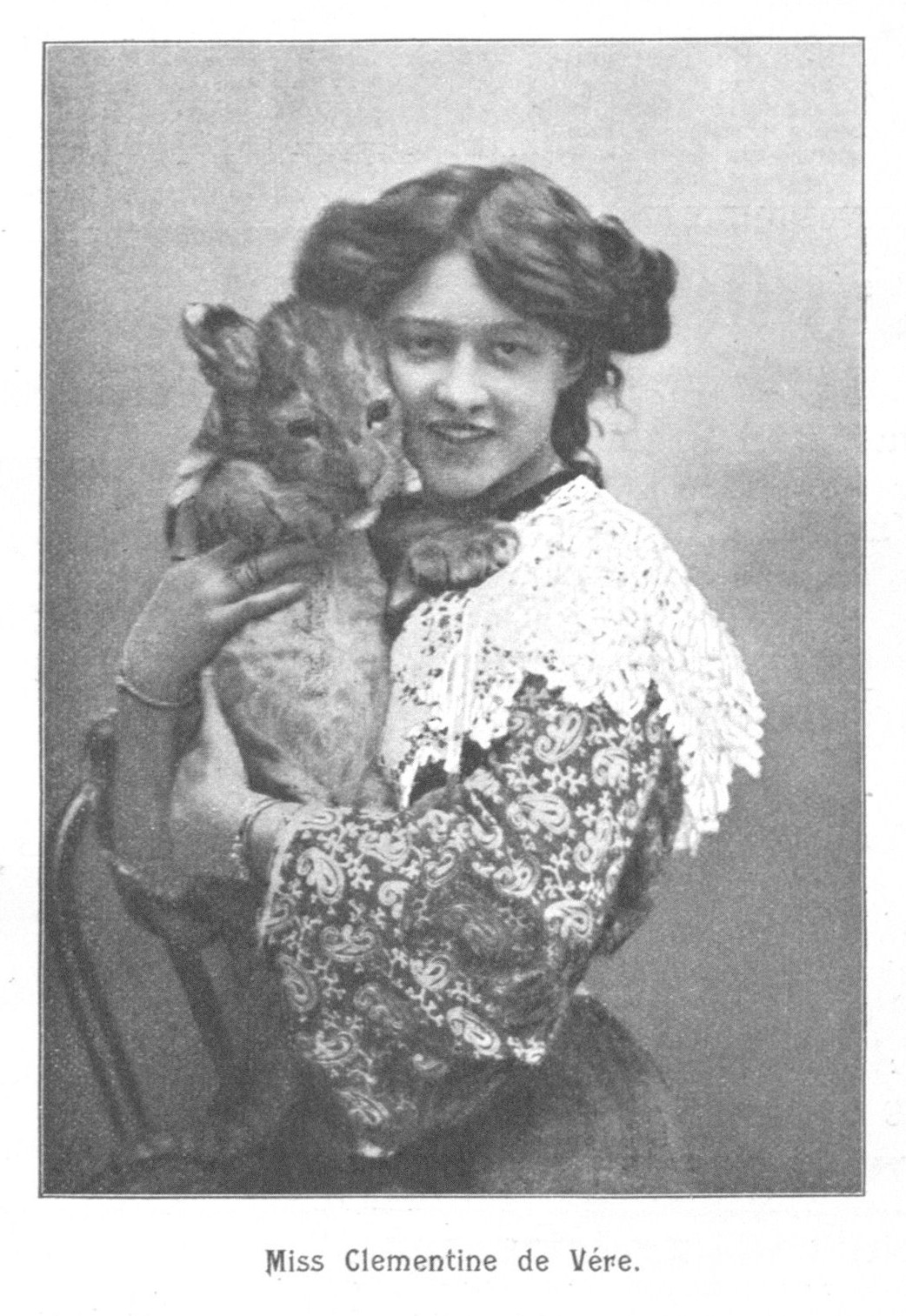
Clementine de Vere aged 15 in 1903

Clementine de Vere, also known by her stage name Ionia (20 December 1888 – 31 March 1973), was a British magician and actor. She was considered by some to be the most influential female magician in the first half of the 20th century. She was also known as Clementine Weedon and Princess Clementine Eristavi Tchitcherine. She was a British citizen, although she was born in Belgium and lived in France for a long period. She performed with the stage name "Ionia - the Enchantress" or the "Goddess of Mystery".

== Early years ==
Born in Brussels, Belgium, Clementine de Vere was the eighth child of the British-born illusionist Herbert Shakespeare Gardiner Williams (1843-1931), a popular conjurer and magician who took the stage name Charles de Vere, and his wife Julia de Vere (née Ferrett, 1852–1916), who performed the first Oriental magic act under the name "Okita". He opened a magic shop in London in 1873, and a magic shop/factory in Brussels in 1878. One of Clementine de Vere's sisters was the French actress Elise de Vère (1879-1917), who starred in the silent film Miss de Vère (English Jig). The family moved to Paris in 1892 where Charles de Vere opened another magic shop which he ran until about 1909, assisted by his sons. Here Clementine de Vere was said to have been influenced by the artists of the Folies Bergère. On 5 May 1904, aged only 15 1/2, she married the American circus artist and tamer Herman Weedon (actually: Herman Armond Wirtheim, 1876–1959) from the Bostock Circus.

In June 1904, the newly married couple travelled to New York as Weedon had a commitment on Coney Island. Clementine accompanied him in the following years on his professional travels in Europe and the United States. From her marriage with Weedon she had a son, Frank H. Weedon (1907-1984), who later was known under the name Frank Wirtheim Tchitcherine. In 1909, Clementine de Vere travelled with Herman Weedon to Denmark, Russia, and Vienna. Between 1900 until 1909 her brother Camille (1885-1909) was working in the family magic business at 13, rue Saulnier in Paris until Camille died of diabetes mellitus. Charles de Vère then gave up his business and retired to Rosny-sous-Bois, where he worked on the preparation of a big show for his daughter Clementine.

== Performing career and "Ionia" ==
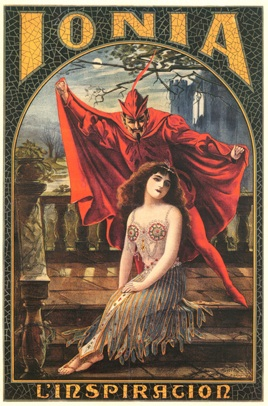
Decorative poster for the magic act "Ionia" c. 1910

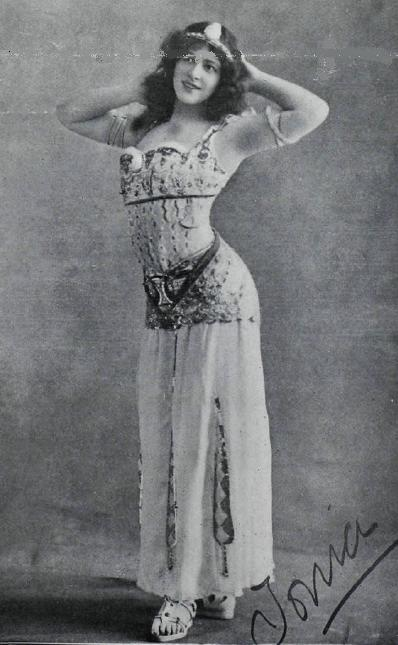
Clementine de Vere as "Ionia" on the cover of The Sphinx March 1911

Clementine's performing career was relatively short, lasting just five years total. Most notably, she performed as "Ionia" for several years in continental Europe before a series of performances in the United Kingdom. Her magic act was constructed by her father Charles de Vere in 1909 and debuted in September 1910 in Marseille. From 1908 until mid-1910, Clementine's act featured trained animals.

On 30 January 1911, she appeared on stage as "Ionia", later sometimes billed as "the Enchantress" or as the "Goddess of Mystery." "Ionia's" act was spectacular, filling the stage with illusions. in an act at the Birmingham Hippodrome in England, in a routine which required six tons of equipment and elaborate Egyptian costumes for Clementine and her male and female assistants. "Ionia" had great success and that year her act was seen in later years in Vienna, Marseille, Lyon, Prague, and other venues. Her last contemporary mention was apparently in the March 1911 issue of the magazine The Sphinx the cover of which showed a photograph de Vère. The text in this issue dealt with her appearance in Manchester.

"Ionia" was contracted to perform in America, but did not due to the sudden closing of Broadway's Folies Bergere of New York. This theatre was opened in the spring of 1911 and closed in October of the same year because of financial difficulties. Clementine de Vere had a contract with this theatre and after its closure could not find suitable employment. In 1912 Clementine spent most of the year performing in Vienna at the KaiserGarten and at the Ronacher theatre.

Her act was advertised with art posters, which many collectors consider to be some of the most artistic posters of magic's Golden Age. Of the 22 known posters for "Ionia" produced by Moody Brothers of Birmingham, only eleven have survived and are now considered expensive collectibles.

Some of the last recorded appearances of Clementine de Vere as "Ionia" were in Vienna, at the Ronacher Theatre. By 1914 Charles de Vere was disappointed that his daughter had not continued her elaborate act and tried to sell the tricks and pieces of equipment to curb the financial losses that had arisen for him.

== Marriage and divorce ==
Clementine de Vere met a Russian-Georgian Prince Vladimir Eristavi Tchitcherine in Austria in 1913 and married him on 21 June 1919 in Paris, after her first marriage had been dissolved on 23 June 1917. The Prince took Clementine to Russia, and in a postscript from a 1928 letter from her father, he noted.

My daughter who was Ionia was at Moscow when the Revolution commenced. All her material pillaged and she was in cellar of Hotel 3 months.

As Clementine had given up magic before when she met Tchitcherine and was not performing magic in Russia, her material did not refer to stage equipment for this purpose. Clementine was in Russia to buy large tracts of real estate.

In the 1920s Clementine de Vere lived temporarily with her second husband in Washington, D.C. and later in Paris. On 26 October 1928, this second marriage too was dissolved, but Clementine de Vere retained the title of Princess, which she had received by the marriage. She lived in France for the rest of her life and was buried with her parents in Batignolles Cemetery in Paris, after her death in 1973.

== Bibliography ==
- Charles Greene III, Ionia. The Queen of Mystery' Magic, December 2006, p. 68 ff.
- Charles Greene III, Ionia Magician Princess Secrets Unlocked, April 2022
