= Alice Fischer (actress) =

American actress

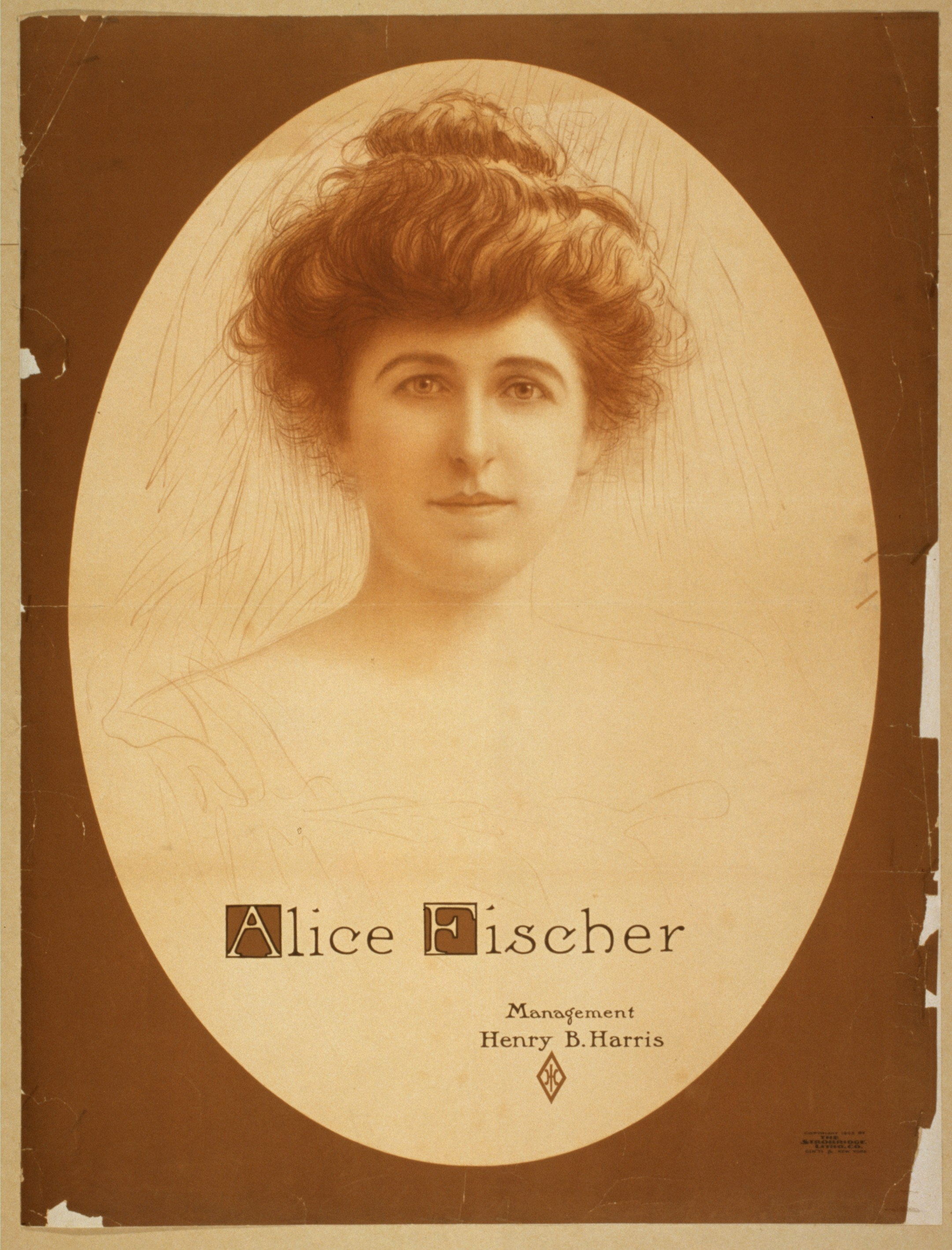
- Alice Fischer in 1903
- Born: January 16, 1869; Terre Haute, Indiana, U.S.
- Died: June 25, 1947 (aged 78); New York City, New York, U.S.
- Occupation: Actress
- Years active: 1887–1935
- Spouse: William King Harcourt

Alice Fischer (January 16, 1869 – June 25, 1947) was an American stage actress born in Indiana. Her one film appearance was the now lost 1917 National Red Cross Pageant.

Fischer was born in Terre Haute, Indiana. When she was 6 years old she portrayed Little Eva in a production of Uncle Tom's Cabin.

She made her stage debut in 1887 in a play called Nordeck. Her Broadway debut was on 3 December 1888 at the Broadway Theatre, playing Minna in Little Lord Fauntleroy. In 1892 she played Agrippina in a production of Nero at the Fourteenth Street Theatre. In 1893 she toured with legendary Joseph Jefferson. She starred as the socialite Mrs. Knobb in the 1906 musical Coming Thro' the Rye at the Herald Square Theatre.

She founded the Twelfth Night Club in New York and was the President of the organization for over 20 years. She married Shakespearian actor William Harcourt King (1866–1923) on May 7, 1893.

== Gallery ==
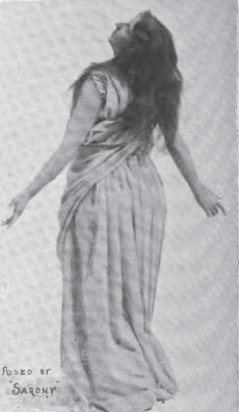
Fischer c. 1896 (studio portrait)

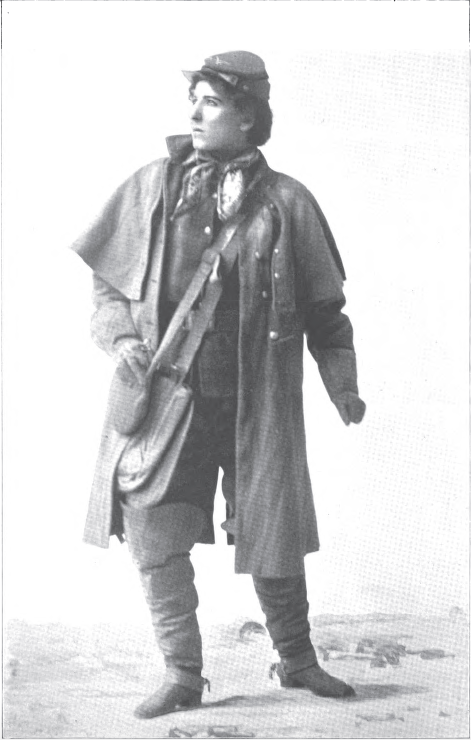
Fischer in an unknown role

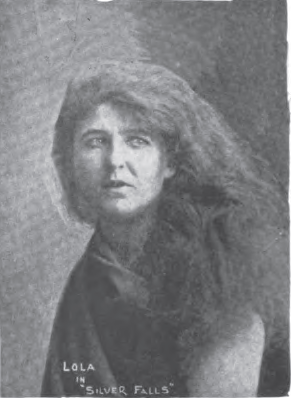
Fischer as Lola in Silver Falls (1896)

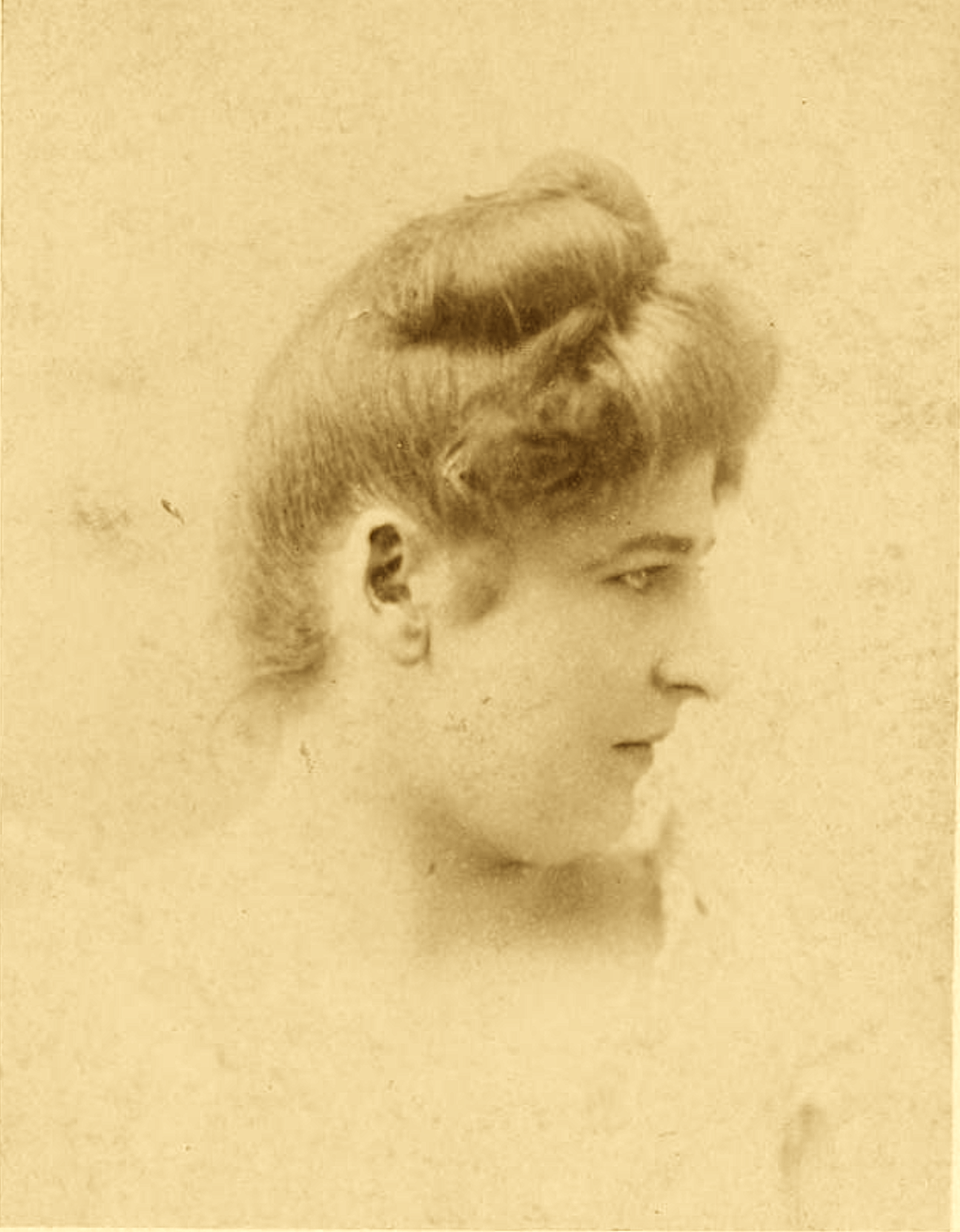
Published in The history of the Boston Theatre, 1854–1901.
