= Ghazaouet =

Ghazaouet الغزوات
- Commune and town
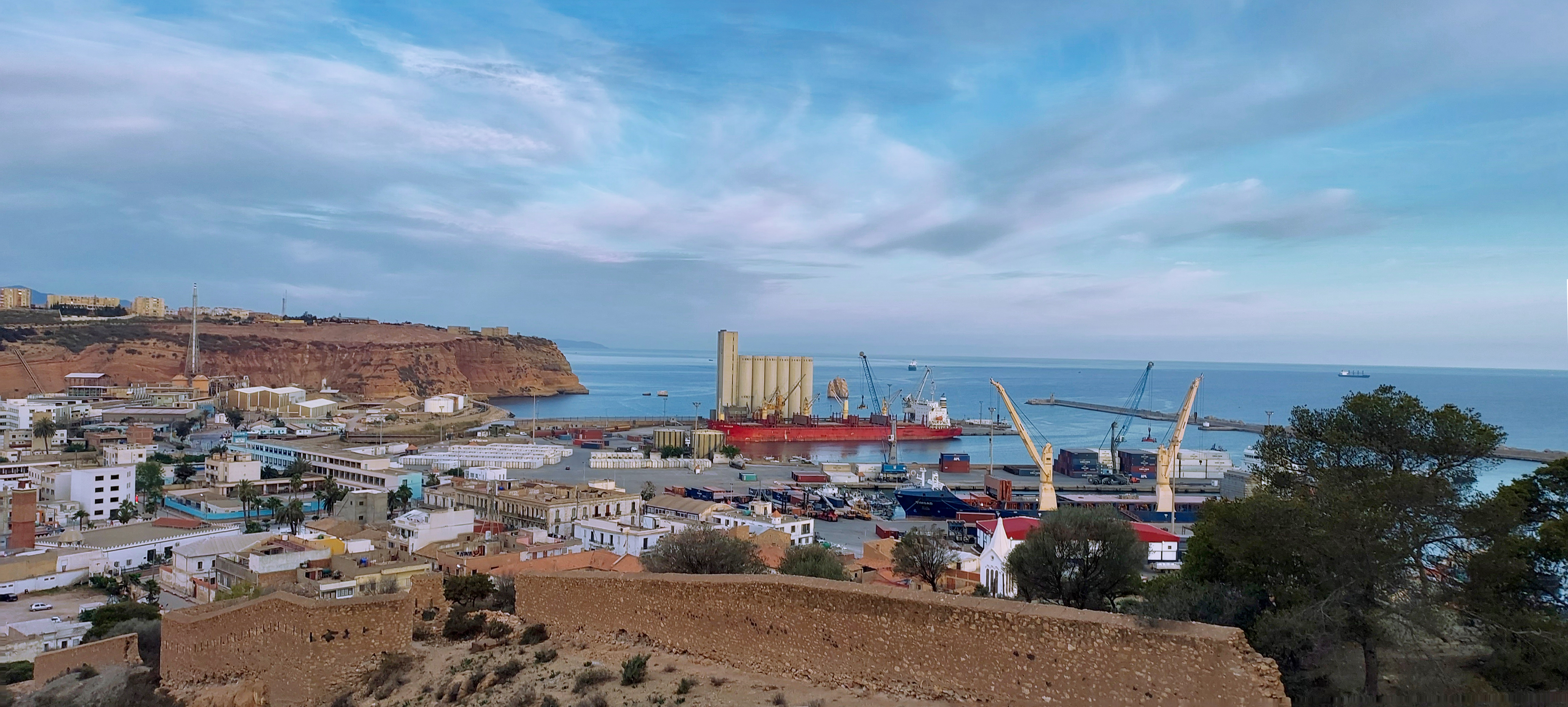

- Location within Algeria
- Coordinates: 35°5′38″N 1°51′37″W
- Country: Algeria
- Province: Tlemcen Province

Population (2008)
  - Total: 33,774
- Time zone: UTC+1 (CET)
- Ghazaouet Lighthouse
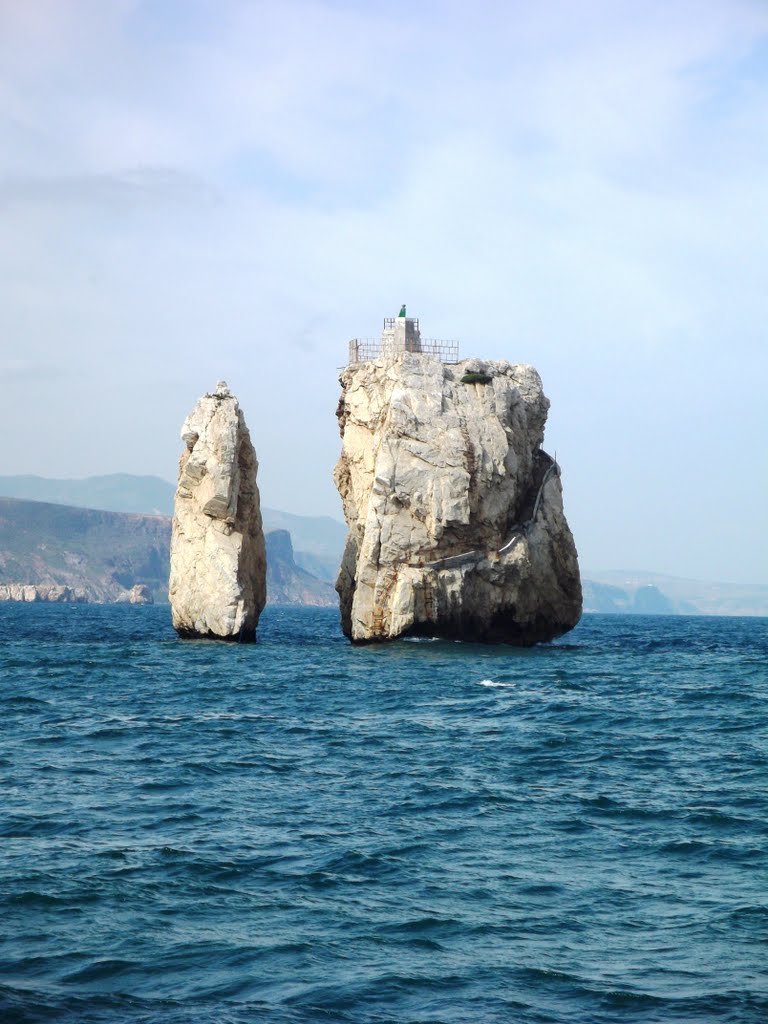
- Coordinates: 35°05′52.45″N 1°52′23.69″W
- Constructed: 1868
- Construction: masonry tower
- Height: 14.5 metres (48 ft)
- Shape: cylindrical tower with balcony and lantern atop the centre of 1-storey keeper’s house
- Markings: white tower, dark green lantern
- Operator: Office Nationale de Signalisation Maritime
- Focal height: 95.4 metres (313 ft)
- Light source: main power
- Range: 22 nautical miles (41 km; 25 mi)
- Characteristic: Fl (3) W 15s.

Ghazaouet is a town and commune in Tlemcen Province in northwestern Algeria. According to the 2008 census it has a population of 33 774. It is renowned for its daily fresh seafood which include: Sardines, mackerels, and red snappers. Ghazaouet boasts with mountainous hills and close ports and beaches where locals can be seen diving and swimming near fishing boats. The port of Ghazaouet is also a point of entry for Algerians entering the country via boat from Almeria, Spain. The well known Algerian comedian Abdelkader Secteur is also from this town. Majority of the Fliti family reside in this area. The Lighthouse of Nemours, as displayed is also known by the locals as "Deux Frères". The rock itself is climbable however, requires a 7-to-10 minute swim from the pier/port to reach whereas, a ladder attached to the rock will allow you to climb onto a staircase to then walk around the top of the lighthouse, in which oftentimes locals dive and jump from 95 meters high. This activity can be recognized just by standing at the pier/port.

== People ==
Jeanne Dortzal was born in Ghazaouet in 1878. Ghazaouet was then a French colony called Nemours and she was called Jeanne-Françoise Thomasset. She found fame in Paris as an actor and poet.

== See also ==
- List of lighthouses in Algeria
