= Jeanne Dortzal =

French actor, poet and playwright (1878–1943)

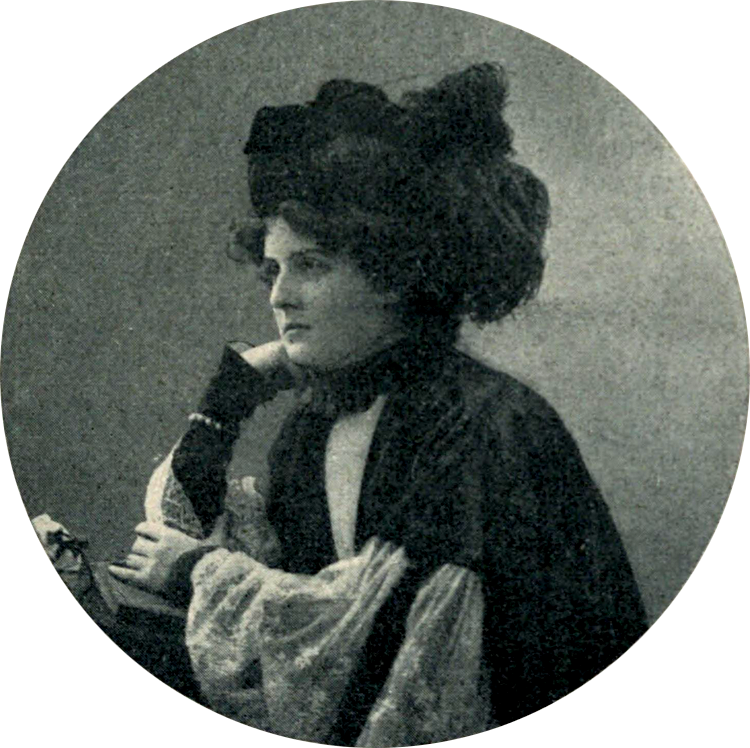
- in 1908
- Born: Jeanne-Françoise Thomasset; January 24, 1878; Ghazaouet
- Died: 1943 (aged 64–65)
- Occupations: actor, poet, playwright
- Known for: acting
- Partner: Pierre Guédy
- Children: Pierre

Signature
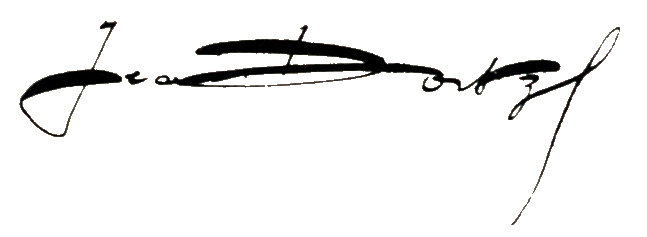

Jeanne Dortzal born Jeanne-Françoise Thomasset (January 24, 1878 – 1943) was a French actor, poet and playwright who was born in Algeria.

== Early life and education ==
Dortzal was born in Ghazaouet in Algeria in 1878. Ghazaouet was then called Nemours and she was called Jeanne-Françoise Thomasset. She said that she had fallen in love with a sheikh but her father objected and the sheikh died in a duel. Her father would not let her become an actress, but her mother left him and took her to Paris. She studied at the Conservatory and also at the Odéon.

== Career ==
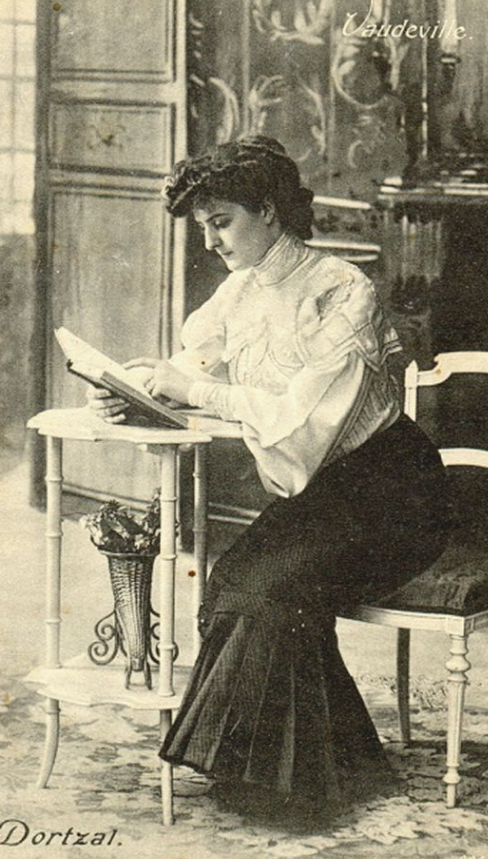
Jeanne Dortzal

François Guermonprez took photos of her and they were used to illustrate Pierre Guédy's 1899 book, The Blue Hour. The illustrations were coloured.

She won the Gil Blas beauty contest in Paris in 1899 beating Elise de Vere. Dortzal was scheduled to appear in vaudeville the following year.

Her partner, Pierre Guédy, died after becoming insane in 1903 leaving her with a son who was also called Pierre. She took to publishing poetry.

Jules Massenet set some of her work to music including a version she had created of the Snow White story after the Brothers Grimm (Perce-Neige et les sept gnomes). It was staged at the Théâtre Fémina in Paris.

In 1921 she published "Les Versets du soleil".

Researchers report that they can find no evidence of her skills after 1930. It is only the discovery of part of a monument to her that confirms that she was alive until 1943.

== Personal life ==
At some point she met Pierre Guédy, with whom she had a son named Pierre.

== Works ==
- Vers sur le sable, 1901
- Vers l'infini, 1904
- Le jardin des dieux, 1908
- Sténio, pièce en 1 acte en vers, 1908
- Perce-neige et les sept gnomes, 1909
- Une bonne leçon, 1910
- Sur les toits bleus du soir, 1911
- Les Cloches de Port-Royal, 1912
- Les versets du soleil, 1921
- La croix de sable, 1927
- Le royaume du sable, 1929
- Le Credo sur la montagne, 1934

== Death ==
She died in 1943, after the death of her son, Pierre. She is the grandmother of actress Antoinette Guédy (1927–2013).
