= Bessie Clayton =

American dancer

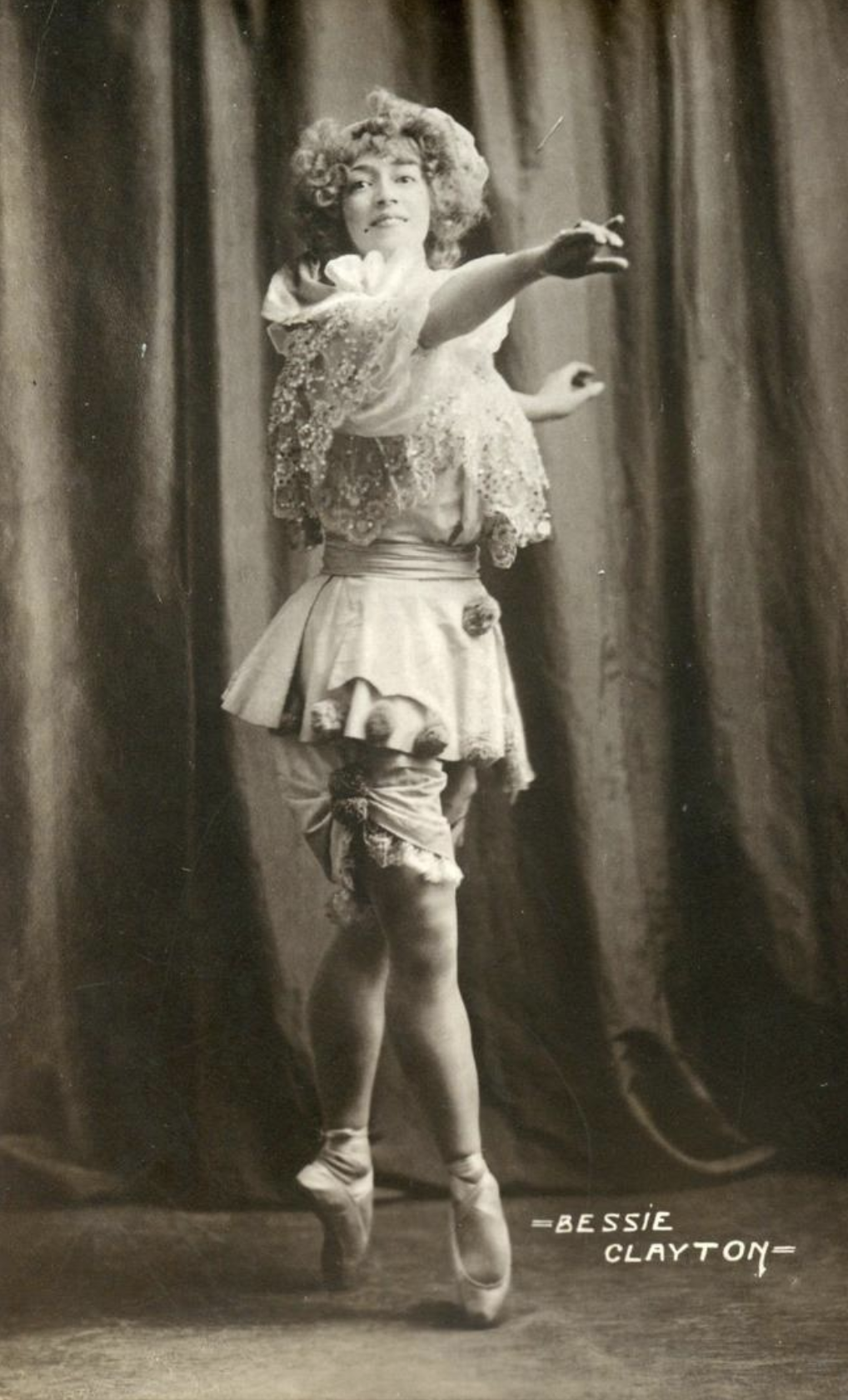
- Bessie Clayton, ca. 1910.png
- Born: c. 1878; Philadelphia, Pennsylvania
- Died: July 16, 1948 (aged 69–70); Long Branch, New Jersey
- Occupation(s): Dancer, choreographer
- Spouse(s): Julian Mitchell 1894-1923 (divorced); Bert Cooper 1924-death
- Children: 1

Bessie Clayton (c. 1878 – July 16, 1948) was an American Broadway and Vaudeville dancer and choreographer. She was an influential bridge between classical ballet and stage dancing. The New York Times called Clayton America’s first native-born prima ballerina.

== Early years ==
The daughter of Edward and Elizabeth Clayton, Bessie Clayton was born in Philadelphia in about 1878. She received her early instruction from the ballet master, George Washington Smith (1820–1899).

== Career ==
During the 1890-91 season, Clayton was under contract to Charles Yale to perform in The Devil's Auction in Philadelphia. In 1891, she replaced Loie Fuller in Charles Hoyt's long-running hit musical, A Trip to Chinatown staged at New York's Madison Square Theatre. . After a company tour to Australia, Clayton returned to Broadway in Hoyt's A Black Sheep. In 1895 she joined the famous variety team of Lew Fields and Joe Weber; she remained with the team until the split of Fields and Weber in 1904."

Clayton became a Vaudeville headliner in 1905 when she appeared at the Hyde and Benham theatre in New York.

She continued to star in Broadway musicals, including The Belle of Mayfair (1906), Hip! Hip! Hooray! (1907) and The Merry Widow Burlesque (1908). She was a principal in the Ziegfeld Follies of 1909. In 1910, she traveled to Europe to perform and work on her classical ballet technique. She studied with M. Curte of the Paris Opera and M. Bossin of La Scala. She achieved fame in Paris and her performances at the Théâtre de la Gaîté contributed to her becoming the first foreign female dancer to receive the French Legion of Honor. Clayton returned to the United States permanently in 1913. She continued performing in Vaudeville venues until retiring from the stage in 1924.

== Critical acclaim ==
Clayton was widely famous in her time, with critics "hailing her as the embodiment and spokesperson of American dance, [and] dubbing her America’s “'greatest premiere danseuse.'" Noting her reputation as "America’s best dancer" and her comparison with the European star Adeline Genée, a contemporary critic declared that "she is the most versatile dancer in the world, can do buck, wing, jig, English skirt dances, all the national dances, ballet, and dramatic dance."

Another critic noted her skill and described her appeal:

What a marvelous whirl of energy is, Bessie Clayton. Her suppleness and absolute control [of] muscle and the lightning speed of her movements leave one gasping. She is here, there, and everywhere, and always buoyant, light-hearted, inconsequential, and full of that restless, tireless nervous energy that animates so much of American life. - Caroline Caffin, author of Vaudeville: the Book, 1914

A modern historian states that Clayton had a lasting influence on dance in America, writing that, with her speed, flexibility, and versatility, she "Became the prototype for the Ziegfeldian stage dancer . . . [her] technique prefigured the kind of female dancing that George Balanchine would create in his Broadway works."

== Personal life ==
On May 23, 1894, Clayton married her choreographer, Julian Mitchell. The couple had one daughter named Priscilla and remained together until 1910 but did not divorce until December 1923. She married her former manager, Bert Cooper, in 1924.

== Death ==
A resident of West Long Branch, New Jersey, where she lived with her granddaughter, Clayton died in 1948 at Hazard Hospital, Long Branch.
