= George Washington Smith (dancer) =

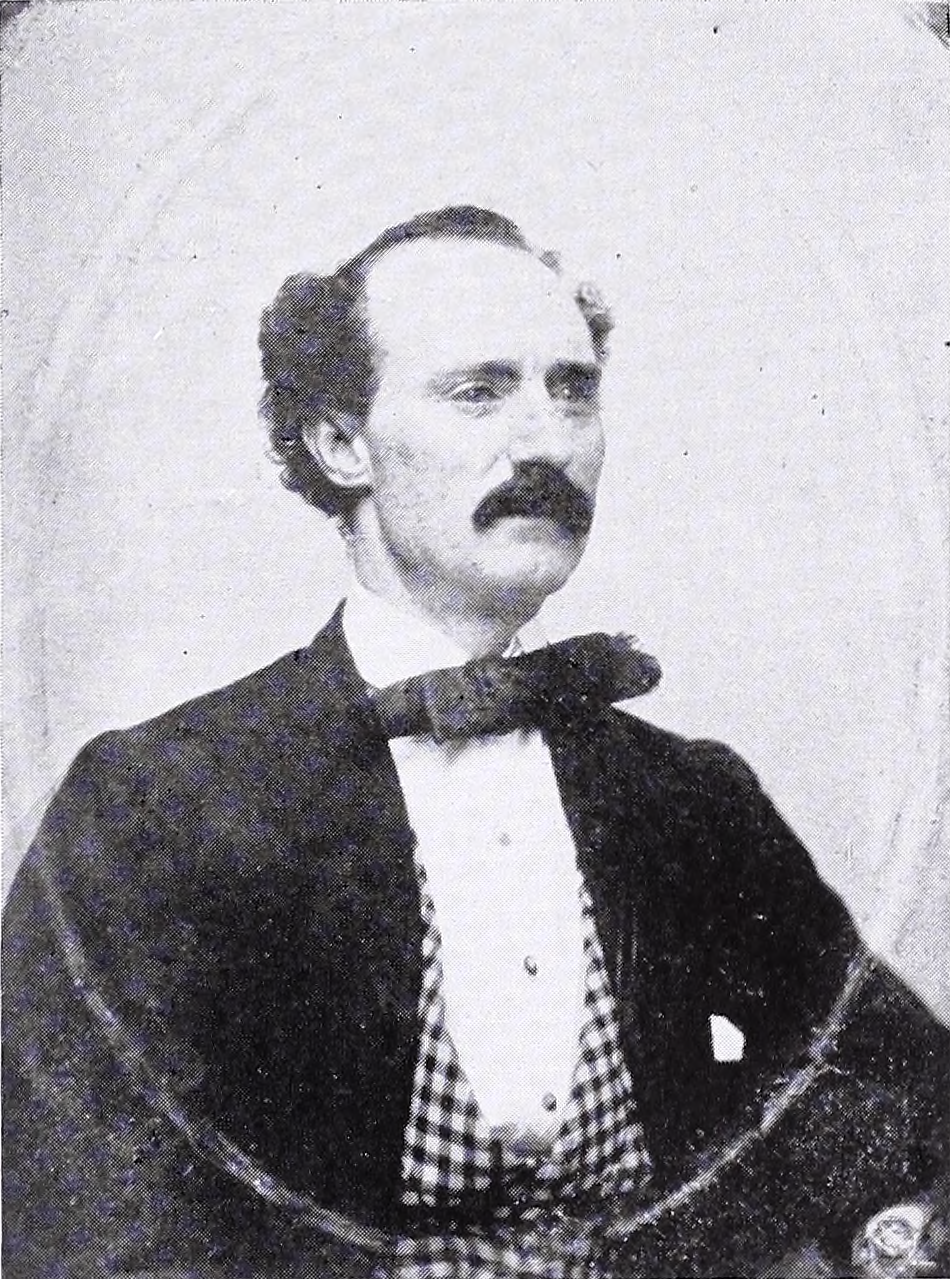
- George Washington Smith
- Occupations: Dancer; Ballet master; Teacher
- Children: Joseph C. Smith

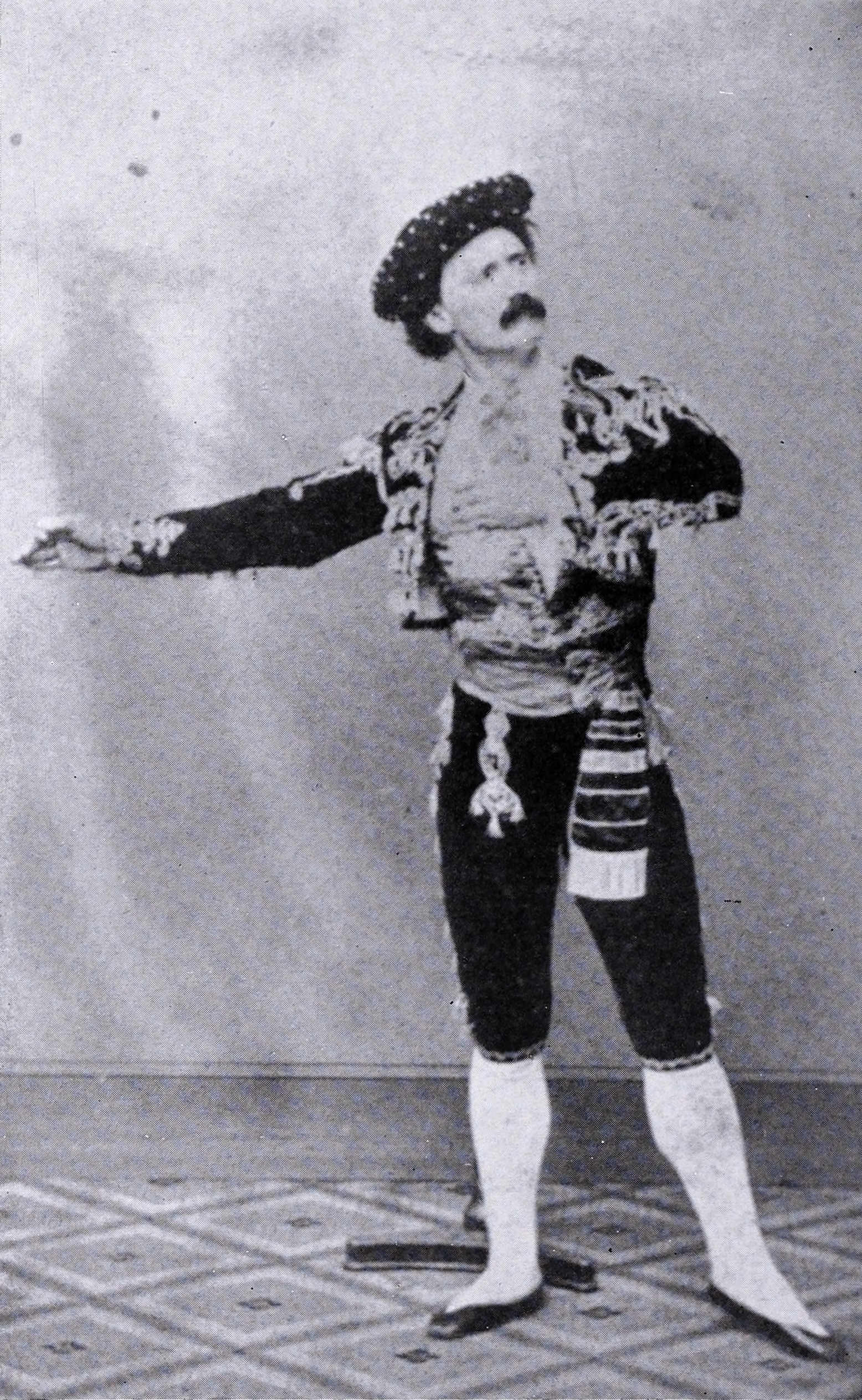
George Washington Smith

George Washington Smith (c. 1820–1899) was an American ballet dancer. He is considered America's first male ballet star.

== Bibliography ==
- Moore, Lillian (1945-06-01). "George Washington Smith". Dance Index. 4 (6–8): 85–136.
