= Coming Thro' the Rye =

1906 musical

Coming Thro' The Rye is a "satiretta" or musical in two acts with both lyrics and book by George V. Hobart and music by A. Baldwin Sloane and J. Sebastian Hiller.

== Plot ==
The plot of Coming Thro' The Rye was fairly loose to allow for a number of vaudeville type specialty acts and for parody asides; including a burlesque send up Edwin Milton Royle's 1905 play The Squaw Man.

Set in Newport, Rhode Island, local wealthy society queen Mrs. Knobs hosts a gathering of poor aspiring artists in the hopes of discovering a genius among them. One of the artists, Vandyke Brown, has displayed his painting "Coming Thro' The Rye" at the party; a work featuring the young model Loleta. Loleta's long-lost father, the Yiddish tailor Ippy Ipstein, is at the gathering and becomes irate upon seeing the painting. Several further misunderstanding unfold and a comedy of errors ensues.

== Performance history ==
Coming Thro' The Rye premiered on Broadway at the Herald Square Theatre on January 9, 1906. It ran at that theatre for 34 performances; closing on February 10, 1906. The musical was directed by Lewis Hooper and produced by George V. Hobart and Will J. Block. It was choreographed by Joseph C. Smith, and used sets by Ernest Albert and costumes by F. Richard Anderson. The original cast included Alice Fischer as Mrs. Knobb, John Park as Vandyke Brown, Dan McAvoy as Ippy Ipstein, Amelia Stone as Loleta, Frank Doane as Lord Battersbee, Georgia Kelly as Diana Conway Black, Nena Blake as Bossie Claude, and William Riley Hatch as William Cactus Claude among others.

The New York critics almost universally skewered the show in the press, and were particularly critical of the performance of Dan McAvoy as Ippy Ipstein and the show's overall vapid storyline. However, the show managed to become a successful road musical after leaving Broadway; touring nationally for two years. The show's creators made numerous alterations to the song list, script, and cast after its initial Broadway run; with only three songs from the original New York production remaining. The actor Frank Lalor replaced McAvoy and fared much better in the part of Ippy Ipstein. Ultimately the show returned to Broadway at the Grand Opera House for further performances beginning January 21, 1907 in a much altered state.

== Bibliography ==
- Bordman, Gerald Martin; Norton, Richard (2010). American Musical Theatre: A Chronicle. Oxford University Press. ISBN 9780199729708.
- Dietz, Dan (2022). "Coming Thro' The Rye". The Complete Book of 1900s Broadway Musicals. Rowman & Littlefield Publishers. ISBN 9781538168943.
- Mantle, Burns; Sherwood, Garrison P.; Chapman, John Arthur (1944). "Coming Thro' The Rye". The Best Plays of 1899-1909. Dodd, Mead & Co.
