= Miss de Vère (English Jig) =

1896 film by Georges Méliès

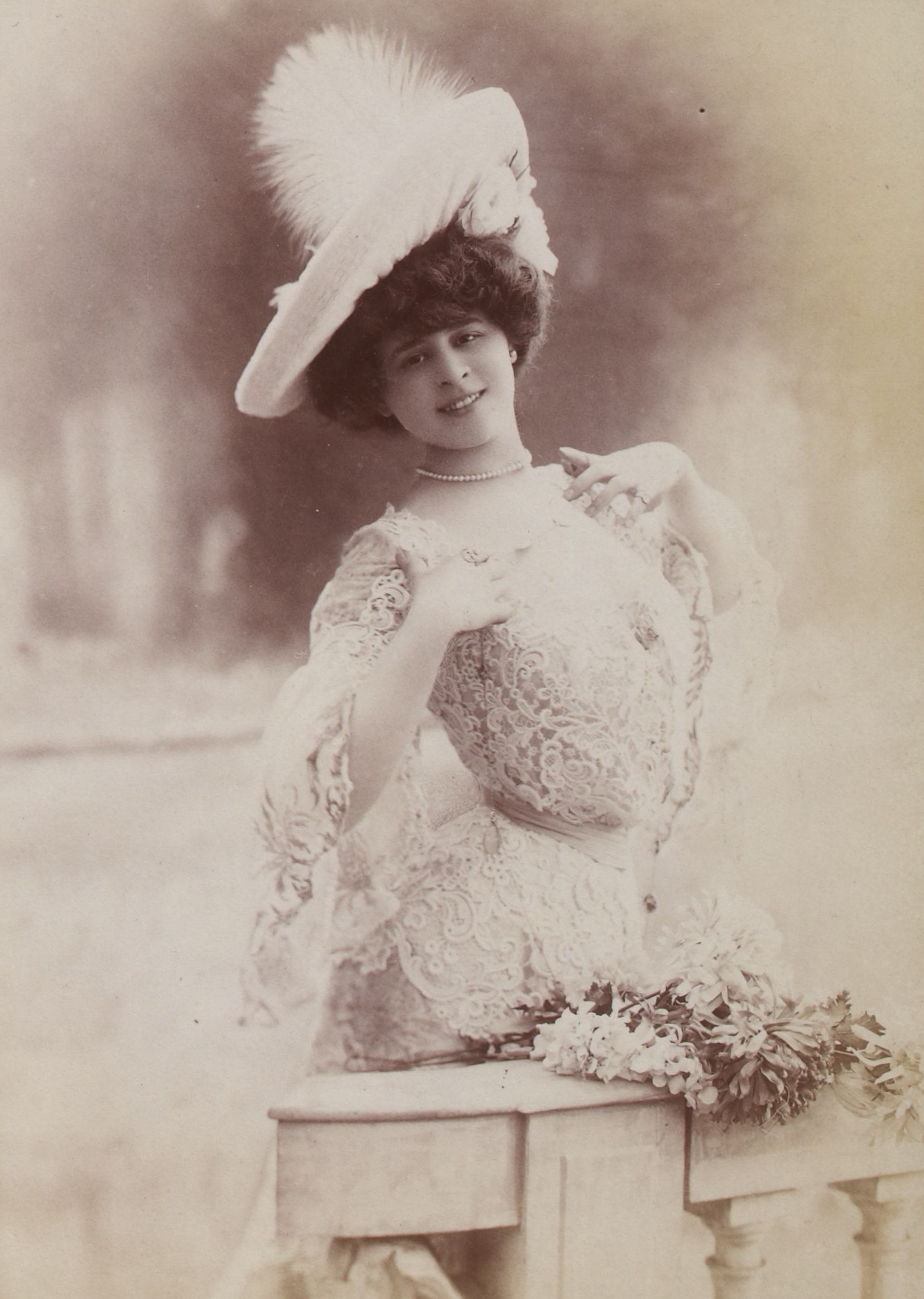
- Elise de Vère
- Directed by: Georges Méliès
- Starring: Elise de Vère
- Distributed by: Star Film Company
- Release date: 1896
- Running time: 20 meters/65 feet
- Country: France
- Language: Silent

Miss de Vère (English Jig) (French: Miss de Vère) is an 1896 French silent film directed by Georges Méliès. It was released by Méliès's Star Film Company and is numbered 45 in its catalogues. The performer, the "Miss de Vère" of the title, is the dancer and actress Constance Elise de Vere. She was, along with Clementine de Vere, a daughter of Charles de Vere (real name H. S. G. Williams), an Englishman who had worked as a professional magician and who was then the owner of a Paris shop selling conjuror's supplies, electrical equipment, and films. Constance Elise de Vere, known professionally as Elise de Vere, married Frank Joseph Godsol in Newark, NJ on December 8, 1917.

== Cast ==
- Elise de Vère as Miss de Vère
  - The dancer

== Production and legacy ==
She was second in the Gil Blas beauty contest in Paris in 1899. The contest was won by Jeanne Dortzal.

The film Miss de Vère in a complete form is currently lost, but a flipbook produced by Léon Beaulieu around 1896–97, rediscovered in the mid-2010s in a private collection, appears to preserve a fragment of the film.

Miss Vère (gigue anglaise) (1896) Méliès (reanimated from flip book)
