= Julian Mitchell (director) =

Julian Mitchell (November 1852 – June 23, 1926) was an American theatre director and choreographer. Known as one of Broadway's most prolific directors, he directed more than eighty musicals between 1884 and 1926. His best remembered show may be The Wizard of Oz (1902).

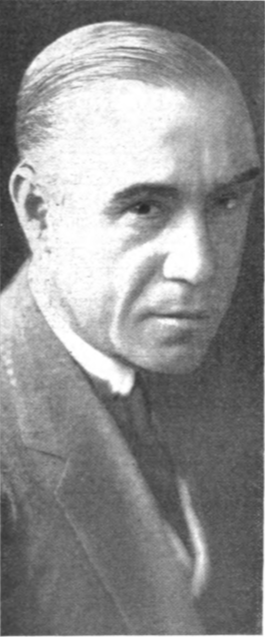
Julian Mitchell in 1912.

Julian was probably born in New York City, and was the nephew of actress Maggie Mitchell. Julian acted in her company from 1879 to 1882.

His education in directing came from Charles Hale Hoyt, for whom he began as a character actor and became a director in 1884. From around the turn of the century he directed and choreographed Weber and Fields shows. In the 1902 Wizard of Oz, it was his idea to summon the North Wind to destroy the poppies in The Wizard of Oz (which were not destroyed in the novel). Other productions he directed include Babes in Toyland, Franz Lehár's Eva, Oh! Oh! Delphine, Ziegfeld Follies of 1912, Ziegfeld Follies of 1925, The Blue Kitten at the Selwyn Theatre, and the ensembles of Our Nell at the Bayes Theatre.

By the time Mitchell was working with Ziegfeld, he reportedly was completely deaf and unable to read music. His methodology was to memorize the lyrics and understand the vibrations of the sounds by standing as close to the piano as possible. Some writers who knew Mitchell disputed the extent of Mitchell's hearing loss, including W. Bob Holland and O. O. McIntyre.

Mitchell had never danced when Weber and Fields hired him to be their director. He was noted for making improvements to numbers without the request of his producer. Mitchell returned to performing on stage in Ziegfeld's Follies of 1910, dancing in the "A Fool There Was" sketch with Louise Alexander.

Mitchell was married first to dancer Georgia Lake, and after they divorced, to Weber & Fields dancer Bessie Clayton, and they had a daughter named Priscilla. His working-class appearance was frequently cited by journalists. Apart from his livelihood, he was interested only in serious literature, such as Charles Dickens and William Makepeace Thackeray. He died in Long Branch, New Jersey, at the age of 72.
