= Joseph W. Herbert =

American dramatist

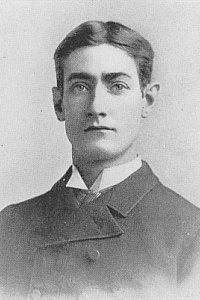
Joseph W. Herbert in 1889

Joseph William Herbert (27 November 1863–18 February 1923) was a British-born American director, silent-film actor, singer and dramatist notable for being the first person to play Ko-Ko in America in a pirate production of Gilbert and Sullivan's The Mikado (1885) before joining D'Oyly Carte Opera Company touring companies across America (1885–1890).

== Early career ==
Herbert was born in Liverpool in 1863 to Irish parents and emigrated to America in 1876 aged 13, living in Chicago where, during his college days, he joined the local Church Choir Company as an amateur chorister. He deputised for a professional comedian who failed to show to play the Lord Chancellor in the company’s production of Iolanthe and when C. D. Hess reformed the company as the Acme Opera Company and sent it on the road (1884) as a professional musical stock company, Herbert went with it. He subsequently played the Lord Chancellor in Iolanthe, Gobo in Les cloches de Corneville, appeared in Fatinitza, The Pirates of Penzance and Patience, played Népomuc in La Grande-Duchesse de Gérolstein and Sir Joseph Porter in H.M.S. Pinafore, etc, through the tour and, following the Acme troupe’s collapse, played with a stuck-together season of a stuck-together company in New Orleans.

Herbert was the first actor to play Ko-Ko in the United States, appearing in Sydney Rosenfeld's pirate production of The Mikado in Chicago in July 1885 before appearing in one performance (breaking a temporary injunction) in the same role at the Union Square Theatre in New York in July 1885, nearly a month before the D'Oyly Carte Opera Company arrived in America with the official production of The Mikado. Herbert appeared as Ko-Ko for two weeks at the Union Square Theatre, opening on 17 August 1885 just two days before the D'Oyly Carte opened with their official production; Herbert and the rest of the cast then transferred to the Grand Opera House in Manhattan.

== D'Oyly Carte and other roles ==
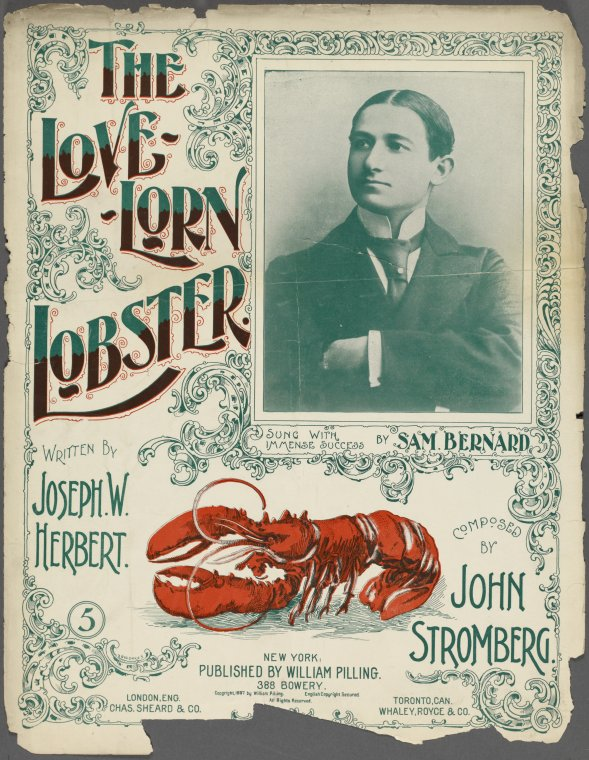
Sheet music cover for 'The Love-Lorn Lobster' (1897) sung by Sam Bernard with lyrics by Herbert and music by John Stromberg

Such was Herbert's success as Ko-Ko that he was engaged by Richard D'Oyly Carte and John Stetson to play the role in New York and New England with the D'Oyly Carte Opera Company's Third American Mikado Company, touring from November 1885 to May 1886. Again for Stetson Herbert played King Gama in Princess Ida from November to December 1886, and he appeared as Reginald Bunthorne in Patience during January 1887 in a D'Oyly Carte approved production in New York. He toured across North-East America for Stetson during the first half of 1887 in other D'Oyly Carte approved productions, again as King Gama in Princess Ida and later as Robin Oakapple in Ruddigore – this time in D'Oyly Carte's Second American Company. In April 1887 he transferred to D'Oyly Carte's Third American Ruddigore Company, playing Sir Despard Murgatroyd; for a short period in early May 1887 he again played Robin Oakapple in New York.

Herbert played Sosoriki in the musical comedy The Pearl of Pekin (1888 and 1889); he made his last appearance with D'Oyly Carte in March 1890 when he briefly took over from Henry Lytton as the Duke of Plaza-Toro in D'Oyly Carte's recast production of The Gondoliers at Palmer's Theatre in New York; he played Mr. Auguste Pompier in the musical The Girl From Paris (1896) at the Herald Square Theatre; Count Berezowski in the operetta The Fortune Teller at Wallack's Theatre (1898); Prince Pumpernickel in the comic opera The Singing Girl (1899–1900); in the musical comedy The Rounders (1900); Maurice de Champignon in the musical comedy The Little Duchess (1901–1902); Damon Marigold in the musical comedy Sally in Our Alley (1902); Michael Dooley in the musical The Street Singer (1904); Washington Graft in The West Point Cadet (1904); The Duke of Toxen in It Happened in Nordland (1904–1905); Captain Carmona in Mexicana (1906); The Laird O'Finnan Haddock in his own About Town alongside his son, Joseph W Herbert Jr. (1906); Marquis d'Aucuneterre in Baron Trenck (1912); Count Buzot in Oh, I Say! (1913) and Duke of Crowborough in Betty (1916).

In his latter years Herbert moved into the media of film, appearing in at least six silent films between 1917 and 1919 including The Divorce Game (1917), The Teeth of the Tiger (1919) and Laughing Bill Hyde (1918).

== Writer and director ==
The chorus in Fascinating Flora (book by R. H. Burnside and Joseph W. Herbert, music by Gustave Kerker) Casino Theatre, New York (1907)

Herbert also carved a career as a successful dramatist and lyricist, writing firstly the book for the comedy After the Ball (1893) while his first musical was The Birth of Venus (1895) with music by Edward Jakobowski. For burlesque he wrote Thrilby (1895), a parody of the successful Trilby and with a score by Frank Osmond Carr; The Geezer (1896–97), a parody of The Geisha; The Social Whirl (1906); Fascinating Flora (1907) and wrote lyrics for The Top o' th' World (1907–1908). He authored a musical play The Prince of Borneo, which was staged in three different versions in three different continents under three different titles in search of success until it eventually emerged in 1909 as The Beauty Spot to music by Reginald De Koven. He wrote The Lamb of Delft (1911); The Duchess (1911); supplied the text for the Al Jolson vehicle The Honeymoon Express (1913); wrote lyrics for Alone at Last (1915–1916) and wrote Honeydew (1920–1921).

As a writer and director Herbert adapted the farce The Turtle (1898); wrote and directed the musical comedy Tommy Rot (1902); wrote, directed and played Miche in the musical Mam'selle Napoleon (1903–1904); wrote and played Laird O'Findon Haddock in About Town (1906); wrote The Great Decide (1906); wrote and played Toby Blockett in The Orchid (1907–1908); wrote the adaptation and played Prince Lothar in A Waltz Dream (1908); wrote and directed the operetta Madame Troubadour (1910) and wrote and directed Sue, Dear (1922). Between 1903 and 1915 Herbert also worked as a stage director, directing, among others the comic opera Red Feather (1903–1904); King of Cadonia (1910); a 1910 revival of The Mikado and The Red Petticoat (1912–1913).

A naturalised American citizen, he married four times: in 1888 to Nanette L. Herbert with whom he had a son, the actor and singer Joseph William Herbert Jr. (1887–1960); in 1895 to the actress Adele Ritchie (divorced); the actress Billie Norton (who he met when they appeared together in It Happened in Nordland in 1904) and Mary Lines Maynard.

Joseph William Herbert died of heart disease in New York in 1923 aged 59.
