= Lyric Theatre (New York City, 1903) =

Former theater in Manhattan, New York

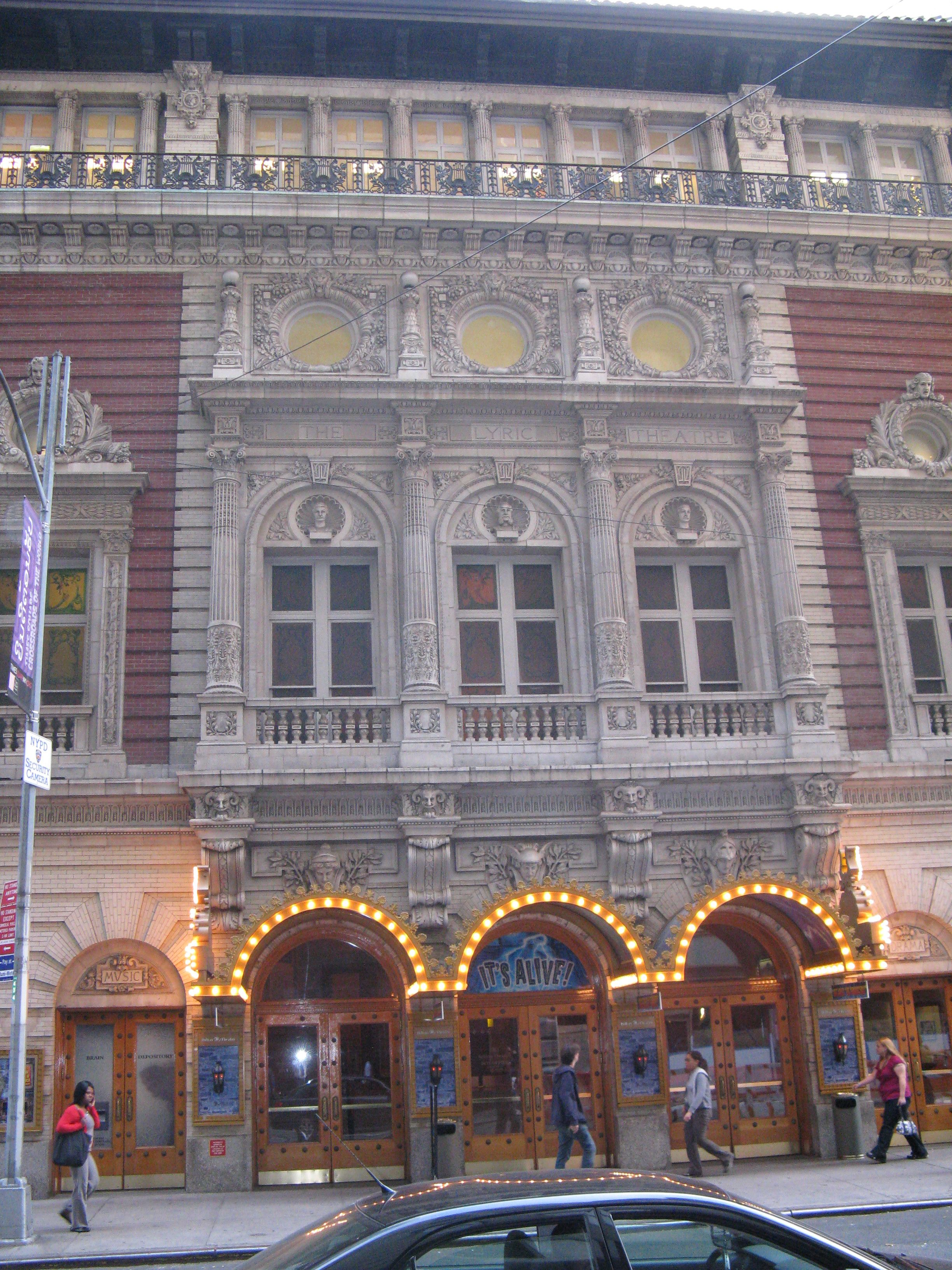
- Former 43rd St. facade of Lyric Theatre in 2008, now the back of the Foxwoods Theatre
- Interactive map of Lyric Theatre
- Address: New York City; United States
- Coordinates: 40°45′24″N 73°59′16″W
- Owner: Shubert Organization
- Capacity: 1,256
- Type: Broadway

Construction
- Opened: October 12, 1903
- Closed: 1992
- Years active: 1903–1934

The Lyric Theatre was a Broadway theatre built in 1903 in the Theater District of Manhattan in New York City. It had two formal entrances: at 213 West 42nd Street and 214-26 West 43rd Street. In 1934, it was converted into a movie theater which it remained until closing in 1992. In 1996, its interior was demolished and the space was combined with that of the former Apollo Theatre to create the Ford Center, now the new Lyric Theatre. Both the 42nd and 43rd Street facades of the original Lyric were preserved and today form the front and back entrances of the modern Lyric Theatre.

== History ==
The theater was originally built by developer Eugene C. Potter as a home for composer Reginald De Koven's American School of Opera. However, the school went bankrupt before construction was finished, and Potter leased the theater and its offices to the Shubert brothers. It was designed by architect Victor Hugo Koehler, and opened on October 12, 1903, with Richard Mansfield's production of Old Heidelberg. While De Koven's plans for the school did not bear fruit, his opera Red Feather was the first stage work with music to be presented at the Lyric Theatre when it premiered on November 9, 1903.

The Lyric originally had approximately 1,350 seats and two balconies. It had eighteen box seats, nine on each side of the auditorium. These were considered far too many for a commercial theater of its size, and six, the top row of each side, were removed soon after the Lyric opened.

The busts shown on the 2nd floor of the facade are of W. S. Gilbert, Arthur Sullivan and Reginald De Koven.

It was converted into a movie theatre in 1934.

== Notable shows ==
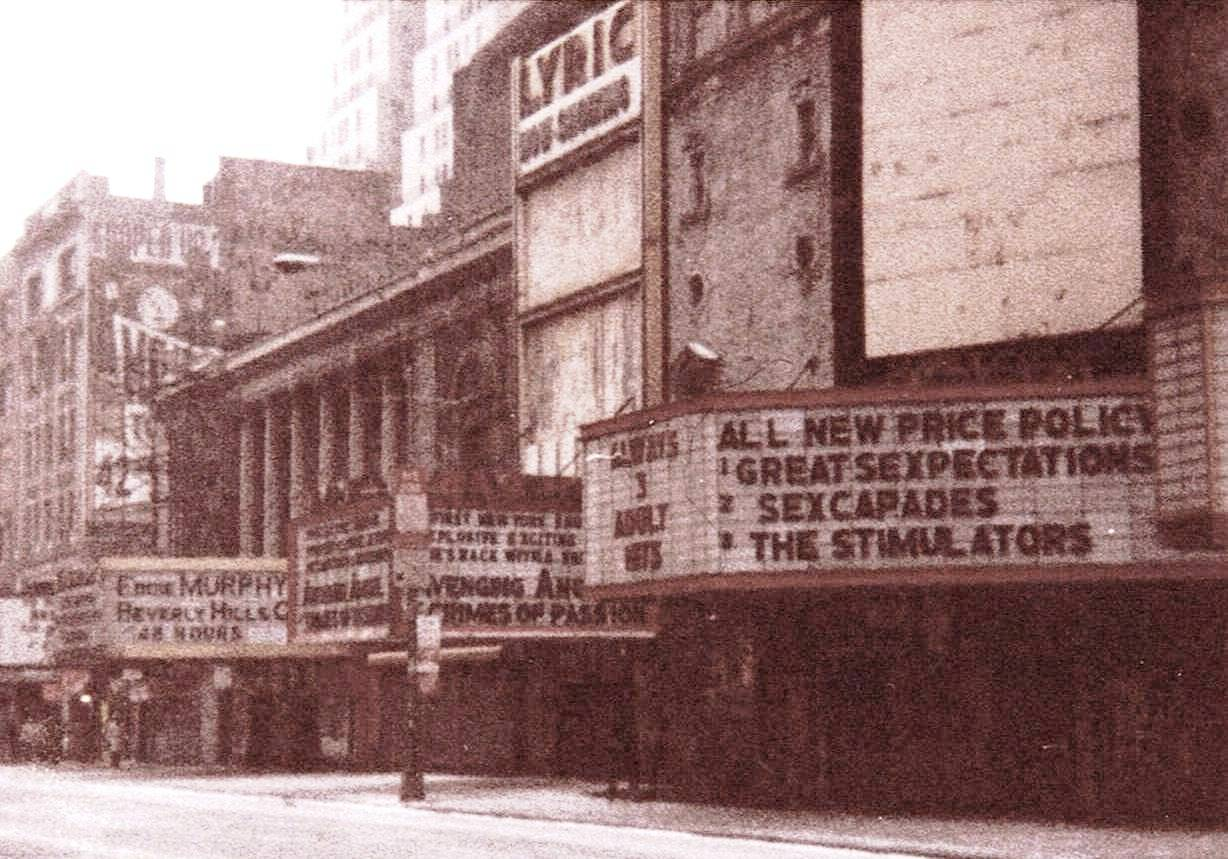
The Lyric as a movie theater in 1985

The Lyric Theatre hosted many notable shows in the early decades of the 20th century. Many plays by William Shakespeare were produced, sometimes multiple times, the most popular being The Merchant of Venice, which was first produced in 1904 and revived three times in 1907. Both Hamlet and Othello were produced three times between 1907 and 1914. Other Shakespearean classics included The Taming of the Shrew, The Twelfth Night, Romeo and Juliet, King Lear, Macbeth and Julius Caesar.

Sarah Bernhardt appeared at the Lyric in 1906. In 1918, Sigmund Romberg's popular operetta Maytime was produced. In 1925, the Marx Brothers appeared in one of their earliest Broadway shows, The Cocoanuts, which in 1929 was adapted into an early sound film, the brothers' first feature film.

Florenz Ziegfeld produced at least three shows there, including Rio Rita in 1927 and The Three Musketeers in 1928.

Cole Porter's musical Fifty Million Frenchmen opened in 1929.

== See also ==
- List of Broadway theaters § Demolished Broadway theaters
