= Nina Sevening =

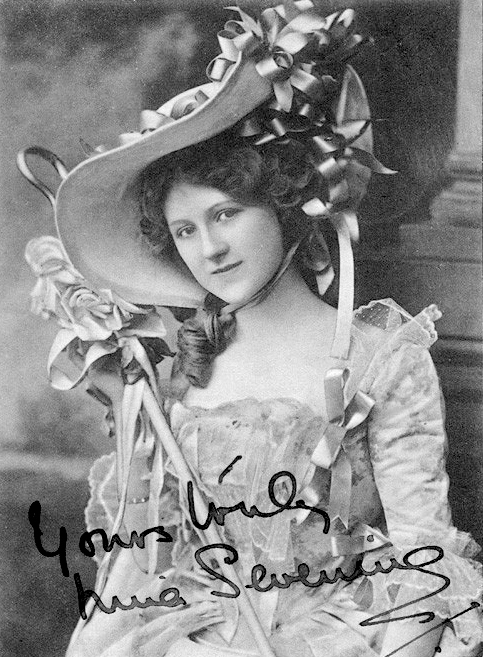
Nina Sevening as Miss Powerscourt in A Country Girl, 1902

Nina Gladys Sevening (1885–1958) was an English stage actress and singer who played minor comedy roles in a long string of Edwardian musical comedies in London and on tour.

== Background ==
Sevening was born in Westminster, London. Her parents were H. W. Sevening, a German-born commercial clerk, and his English wife Gertrude. She was educated in London and Paris.

== Career ==
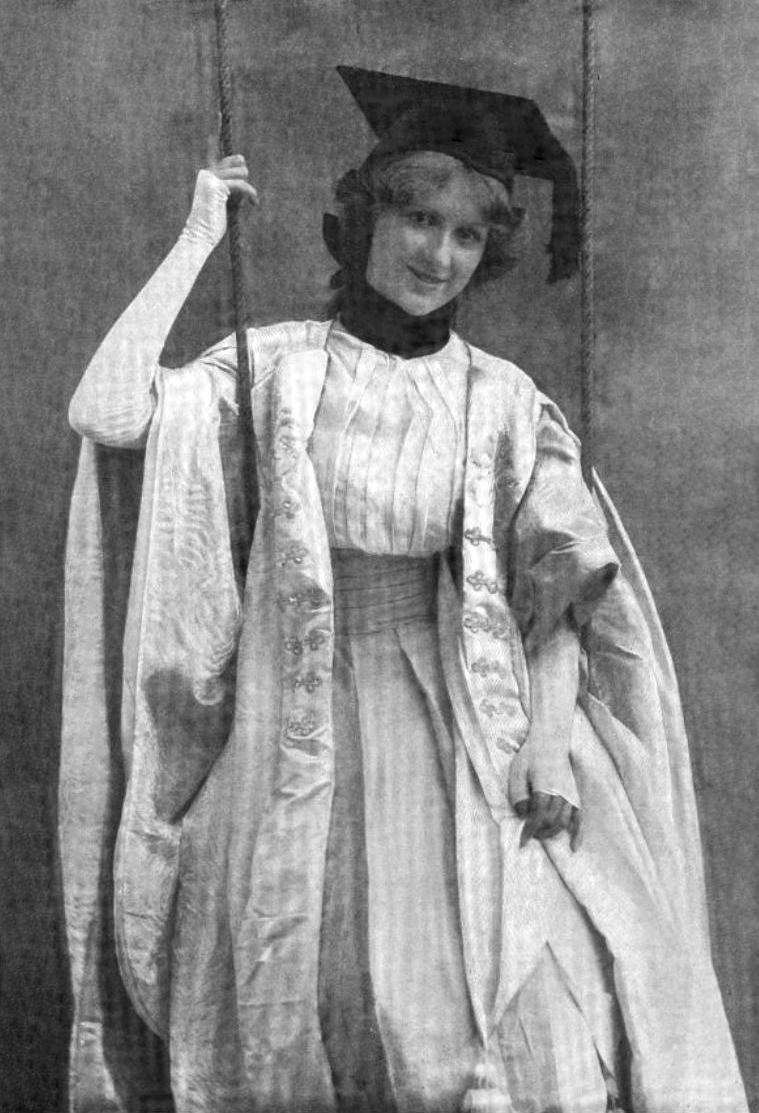
As Mary Anstell in The Silver Slipper

Sevening first appeared on stage in December 1894 in The House That Jack Built at the Opera Comique. She later appeared in:

- My Innocent Boy at the Royalty Theatre 1898
- Florodora at the Lyric Theatre 1899
- The Silver Slipper at the Lyric Theatre 1901
- A Country Girl at Daly's Theatre 1902
- The Cingalee at Daly's Theatre 1904
- The Little Michus at Daly's Theatre 1905
- The Merveilleuses at Daly's Theatre 1906
- The Geisha at Daly's Theatre 1906
- The Merry Widow at Daly's Theatre 1907
- Susannah and Some Others at the Royalty Theatre 1908
- Marjory Strode at The Playhouse 1908
- Mid-Channel at St James's Theatre 1909
- The Great Mrs. Alloway at the Globe Theatre 1909
- Mid-Channel at the Empire Theatre (New York) 1910
- A Woman's Way, Comedy Theatre 1910
- Grace at the Duke of York's Theatre 1910
- Passers By at Wyndham's Theatre 1911
- What Every Woman Knows at the Duke of York's Theatre 1911
- Mind the Paint Girl at the Duke of York's Theatre 1912
- The Perplexed Husband at the Empire Theatre (New York) 1912
- Peter Pan at the Duke of York Theatre 1913
- King's Cup at the Adelphi Theater 1913
- The Clever Ones at Wyndham's Theatre 1914
- Caroline at the New Theatre 1916
- Trelawny of the 'Wells' at the New Theatre 1917

In 1903, Sevening toured in Three Little Maids. In 1905 she was a replacement player in the role of Gwenny Holden in Lady Madcap.

She married Victor Charles Hamilton Longstaffe (born 1885) and changed her last name after him. She retired from the stage in 1917.

There is a memorial to their only son, David John Longstaffe, in Aldeburgh Parish Church in Suffolk, England. David died on 16 September 1945 in Athens, where he was a Captain in the King's Royal Rifle Corps.

== Bibliography ==
- J. P. Wearing (2013). The London Stage 1900-1909: A Calendar of Productions, Performers, and Personnel. Scarecrow Press. ISBN 978-0-8108-9294-1.
