= Florodora =

Edwardian musical comedy by Owen Hall

- Music: Leslie Stuart; Paul Rubens
- Lyrics: Paul Rubens; Ernest Boyd-Jones
- Book: Owen Hall (pseudonym for James Davis)
- Productions: 1899 West End; 1900 Broadway; 1902 Broadway revival 1905 Broadway revival 1915 West End revival 1920 Broadway revival 1931 West End revival International tour 2006 West End revival

Florodora is an Edwardian musical comedy. After its long run in London, it became one of the first successful Broadway musicals of the 20th century. The book was written by Jimmy Davis under the pseudonym Owen Hall, the music was by Leslie Stuart with additional songs by Paul Rubens, and the lyrics were by Ernest Boyd-Jones, George Arthurs and Rubens.

The original London production opened in 1899 where it ran for a very successful 455 performances. The New York production, which opened the following year, was even more popular, running for 552 performances. After this, the piece was produced throughout the English-speaking world and beyond. The musical was famous for its double sextet and its chorus line of "Florodora Girls".

The piece was popular with amateur theatre groups, particularly in Britain, into the 1950s.

== Background ==
Florodora was the first of a series of successful Edwardian musical comedies by Stuart, including The Silver Slipper (1901), The School Girl (1903), The Belle of Mayfair (1906), and Havana (1908).

== Productions ==
Upon opening in London on 11 November 1899 at the Lyric Theatre, the musical starred Evie Greene, Willie Edouin and Ada Reeve. Its original run of 455 performances was unusually long for the time, and it closed in March 1901. The show would prove a training ground for numerous rising stars of the British theatre. After opening at the Casino Theatre on Broadway on 12 November 1900, it moved to the New York Theatre on 14 October 1901 and finally closed on 25 January 1902, a run of 552 performances – the first instance of a London production achieving such a Broadway run, and the third-longest run on Broadway of any theatre piece up to that time.

A good part of the success of the musical was attributed to its chorines, called "the English Girls" in the score, but soon popularly dubbed the "Florodora Girls". They consisted of a "sextette of tall, gorgeous damsels, clad in pink walking costumes, black picture hats and carrying frilly parasols [who] swished onto the stage and captivated New York for no other reason than they were utterly stunning." More than 70 women, each 5 ft. 4 in. (about 1.63 m) tall and weighing 130 lb (59 kg), played these roles in the first run of the play. These women were also the object of a great deal of popular adoration, and many male admirers persuaded chorines to leave show business and settle down. According to W. A. Swanberg: "Each member of its original sextette married a millionaire." Florodora's famous double sextet, "Tell me pretty maiden", became the most successful show tune of its time. Other songs ranged from traditional waltzes such as "The Silver Star of Love" and "The Fellow Who Might" to the more quirky rhythmic and long-lined dance numbers for which Stuart was known. An original cast album featured all six original sextet members from the New York Cast: Marie Wilson, Agnes Wayburn, Marjorie Relyea, Vaughn Texsmith, Daisy Green and Margaret Walker. Recorded on a series of six 78 RPM gramophone records with a full libretto enclosed, the album was a first for musical theatre at that time. The Florodora Girls included Edna Goodrich, Evelyn Nesbit and Clarita Vidal.

The musical was mounted in Australia in 1900 by J. C. Williamson, where it enjoyed another long run. The original production toured for years in the U.S. and was revived on Broadway in 1902, 1905, and 1920. In addition to the numerous local productions mounted throughout the English-speaking world and beyond, including productions translated into more than a dozen languages, the show toured extensively with numerous local touches. London's West End staged two successful revivals in 1915 and 1931, and several Broadway revivals were staged, the first being mounted only a year after the closing of the original production in 1901 followed by another three years later. Among later revivals, a young Milton Berle played one of the Florodora Boys in a production mounted for the 1920–21 Broadway season. The musical was revived at the Finborough Theatre in January 2006 for its first professional London production in many years.

== Synopsis ==
=== Act I ===
In Florodora, a small island in the Philippines, the popular fragrance "Florodora" is manufactured from the essence of the Florodora flower. The perfume factory, along with the island itself, is owned by Cyrus W. Gilfain, an American who finagled the business away from Dolores's family and is now the island's reigning sovereign and sole employer. Although Dolores is now forced to work for Gilfain, she remains optimistic. Frank Abercoed, who is really Lord Abercoed in disguise, has arrived on the island to act as Gilfain's manager. He is immediately smitten with Dolores, and she with him.

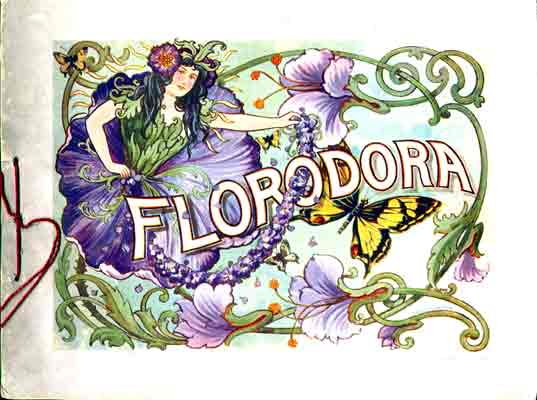
Souvenir programme cover, Broadway (1900)

Aboard a ship docked at the Florodora harbor are Lady Holyrood, titled but penniless, who has come to Florodora at Gilfain's suggestion to find a husband – specifically, Frank. She is accompanied by Gilfain, his daughter Angela, who is betrothed to Captain Arthur Donegal, Lady Holyrood's brother, and several of Angela's friends (the "English Girls"), who intrigue Gilfain's clerks. Also aboard the ship is Anthony Tweedlepunch, a detective who is searching for the girl who rightfully owns the perfume business. He comes to the island disguised as a traveling showman, phrenologist, hypnotist, and palmist.

Gilfain discovers that Frank and Dolores have fallen in love. In an effort to thwart Dolores' rightful claim to the Florodora fortune, Gilfain plans to marry her himself. He hires Tweedlepunch, who he thinks is an actor, to break up the love affair between Dolores and Frank, thereby making Frank available to marry Angela. By presenting Tweedlepunch as a highly respected phrenologist, Gilfain plots to marry off his clerks to the heads of the Florodora farms (all young island girls), thereby attaining even more control of the island. Tweedlepunch plays along, duly examining everyone's cranial bumps of love to pronounce the proper marriage couples.

Frank refuses to marry Angela, and Gilfain discharges him. Gilfain, based on the fraudulent pronouncements of Tweedlepunch, has decreed that the clerks will wed the island girls or be discharged. Everyone is upset. Frank must now return to England, and he tells Dolores he must go but will return for her if she waits patiently. Everyone meets at the dock to see Frank off.

=== Act II ===
Six months later, Gilfain has managed to become the owner of Abercoed Castle, Frank's ancestral home in Wales, and everyone has travelled there. Gilfain's clerks, having been discharged rather than marry the island girls, finally meet up with their English girls (Angela's friends). Tweedlepunch has finally realized that Dolores is the rightful heir to the Florodora fortune. He tells her that her father was his only friend, and that he will help her retrieve her family business. They break into the Abercoed castle but are surprised by a chorus of lords and ladies who demand to know who they are. In desperation they try to convince everyone that they are the evening's entertainment.

The famous double sextet, "Tell me pretty maiden", in the New York production, 1900

Lady Holyrood, with no prospective husbands in sight, decides that Gilfain will become her next husband. Frank, who has been refused entrance to the castle by Gilfain, defies orders and maneuvers his way inside the courtyard. There he sees Dolores for the first time since he left the island. After some confusion, Frank tells Dolores that he is really Lord Abercoed and was unable to return to her in Florodora because he was trying to keep Gilfain from acquiring his ancestral home. Tweedlepunch finally confronts Gilfain and spins a wild ghost yarn that terrifies Gilfain into admitting that he has stolen the perfume business. Gilfain returns the properties he has taken from Dolores and Frank. Frank marries Dolores; Gilfain marries Lady Holyrood; and Angela marries Captain Donegal.

== Roles and original cast ==
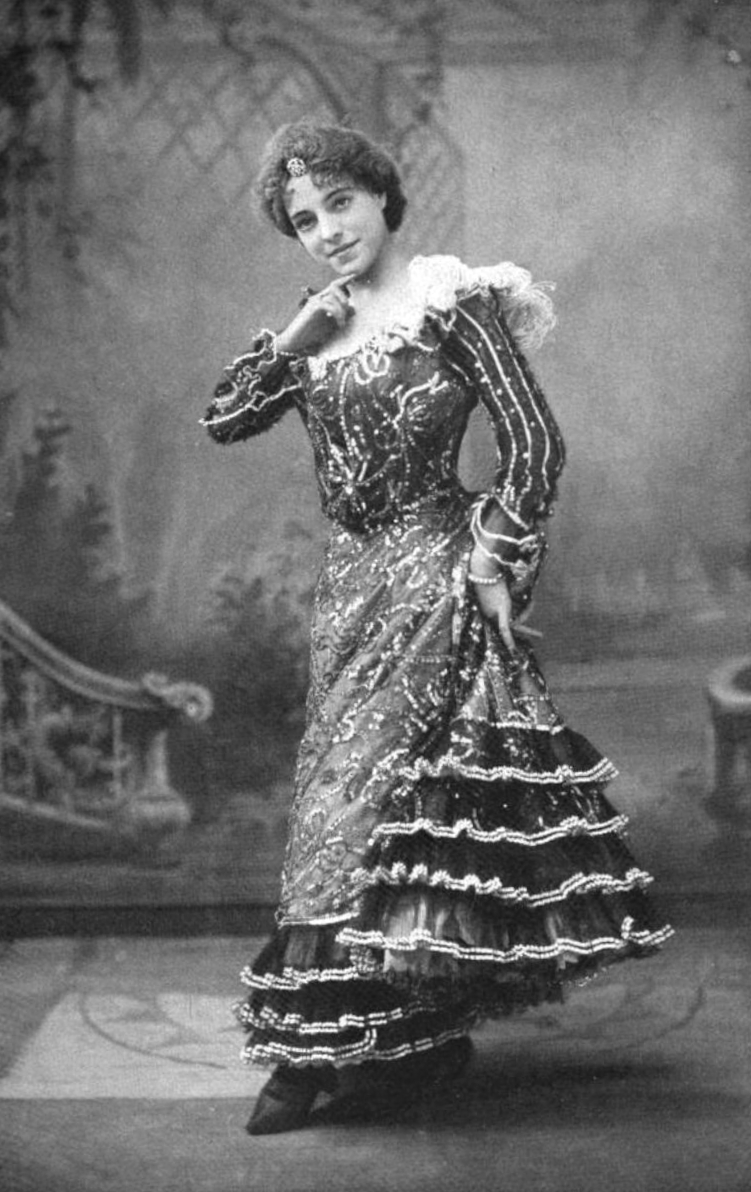
Ada Reeve as Lady Holyrood

- Cyrus W. Gilfain – Charles E. Stevens (Proprietor of the perfume factory and holder of the island of Florodora)
- Frank Abercoed – Melville Stewart (Manager, for Cyrus, of the island of Florodora)
- Leandro – Frank Holt (Overseer of Farms)
- Capt. Arthur Donegal – Edgar Stevens (4th Royal Life Guards – Lady Holyrood's brother)
- Anthony Tweedlepunch – Willie Edouin (Detective disguised as a phrenologist, hypnotist & palmist)
- Gilfain's clerks: Tennyson Sims, Ernest Pym, Max Aepfelbaum and Reginald Langdale – Roy Horniman, Ernest Lambart, Alfred Barron and Frank Hascoll
- Dolores – Evie Greene (Rightful heir to the island)
- Valleda – Nancy Girling (Florodorean maid to Lady Holyrood and head of one of the farms)
- Angela Gilfain – Kate Cutler (daughter of Gilfain)
- Lady Holyrood – Ada Reeve
- Farmers, flower-girls and others

== Musical numbers ==
Music from Florodora
"In the shade of the palm"
First line: "There is a garden fair"; c. 1908 Edison Records recording by Frank C. Stanley

"Tell me pretty maiden"
C. 1908 Edison Records recording by the "Edison Sextette" (Ada Jones, George S. Lenox, Corinne Morgan, Grace Nelson, Bob Roberts and Frank C. Stanley)

Act I

- No. 1. Chorus – "Flowers a-blooming so gay"
- No. 2. The Clerks' Song – Sims, Pym, Aepfelbaum, Langdale, Crogan and Scott – "The credit's due to me."
- No. 3. Dolores – "Bright silver star of love"
- No. 4. Dolores and Abercoed – "If you're in love with somebody"
- No. 5. Chorus of Welcome – "Hurrah! The master comes!"
- No. 6. English Girls and Clerks – "Come, take us round to see the sights"
- No. 7. Lady Holyrood – "I'm a lady, don't forget, with a sense of etiquette"
- No. 8. Angela and Donegal – "Love in his youth is a fiery steed"
- No. 9. Lady Holyrood, Gilfain and Tweedlepunch – "I want to marry a man, I do"
- No. 10. Angela and Chorus – "There was a maiden decidedly fair"
- No. 11. Gilfain – "There is nothing we disparage"
- No. 12. Lady Holyrood, Donegal and Angela – "When an interfering person such as you"
- No. 13. Abercoed – "In the shade of the palm"
- No. 14. Finale Act I – "Hey! hey! Alack-a-day! Our loving hearts asunder"

Act II

- No. 15. Chorus – "Come, lads and lasses, trip your light and airy"
- No. 16. Lady Holyrood – "There are people who have tried to be smart and dignified"
- No. 17. Gilfain – "When you're a millionaire"
- No. 18. English Girls and Clerks – "Tell me, pretty maiden, are there any more at home like you?"
- No. 19. Lady Holyrood – "Now I've met, in my time, some curious men"
- No. 20. Finale – "And the nation will declare"

Supplementary numbers

- No. 21. Dolores – "In the Philippines lived a maiden fair"
- No. 22. Valleda and Leandro – "A maid's career is skittles and beer"
- No. 23. Donegal – "I want to be a military man."
- No. 24. Dolores – "A woman's love is but a tender flow'r"
- No. 25. Angela – "Willie was a gay boy."
- No. 26. Dolores and Tweedlepunch – "We're both on the stage, we two"
- No. 27. Dolores – "Far away on the ocean of sunshine and foam"

== In popular culture ==
- "I Was a Florodora Baby" was a 1920 song with music by Harry Carroll and lyrics by Ballard MacDonald introduced by Fanny Brice in the Ziegfeld Follies.
- The musical film The Florodora Girl (1930) stars Marion Davies as one of the chorus girls in the original Broadway production of Florodora. The song Tell Me Pretty Maiden is featured.
- In the 1935 film The Girl from 10th Avenue, a landlady, Mrs. Martin (Alison Skipworth) recalls her days as a Florodora Girl throughout the movie.
- A subplot in the Little Rascals film Our Gang Follies of 1936 revolves around the specialty act "The Flory-Dory Sixtet" [sic], and their failure to appear at the revue that the Little Rascals present.
- In the film On the Town, Chip (Frank Sinatra) is picking sights to see from an out-of-date guidebook and sings, in "Come Up to My Place", that he wants to see a "girly show" called the "Flora Dora Girl".
- The Floradora cocktail is named after the musical.

== Bibliography ==
- Uruburu, Paula (2008). American Eve: Evelyn Nesbit, Stanford White, the Birth of the 'It' Girl, and the Crime of the Century (hardcover) (1st ed.). Riverhead Books. ISBN 978-1594489938.
