= Ruby Ray (actress) =

English stage actress in Victorian and Edwardian musical comedy and drama

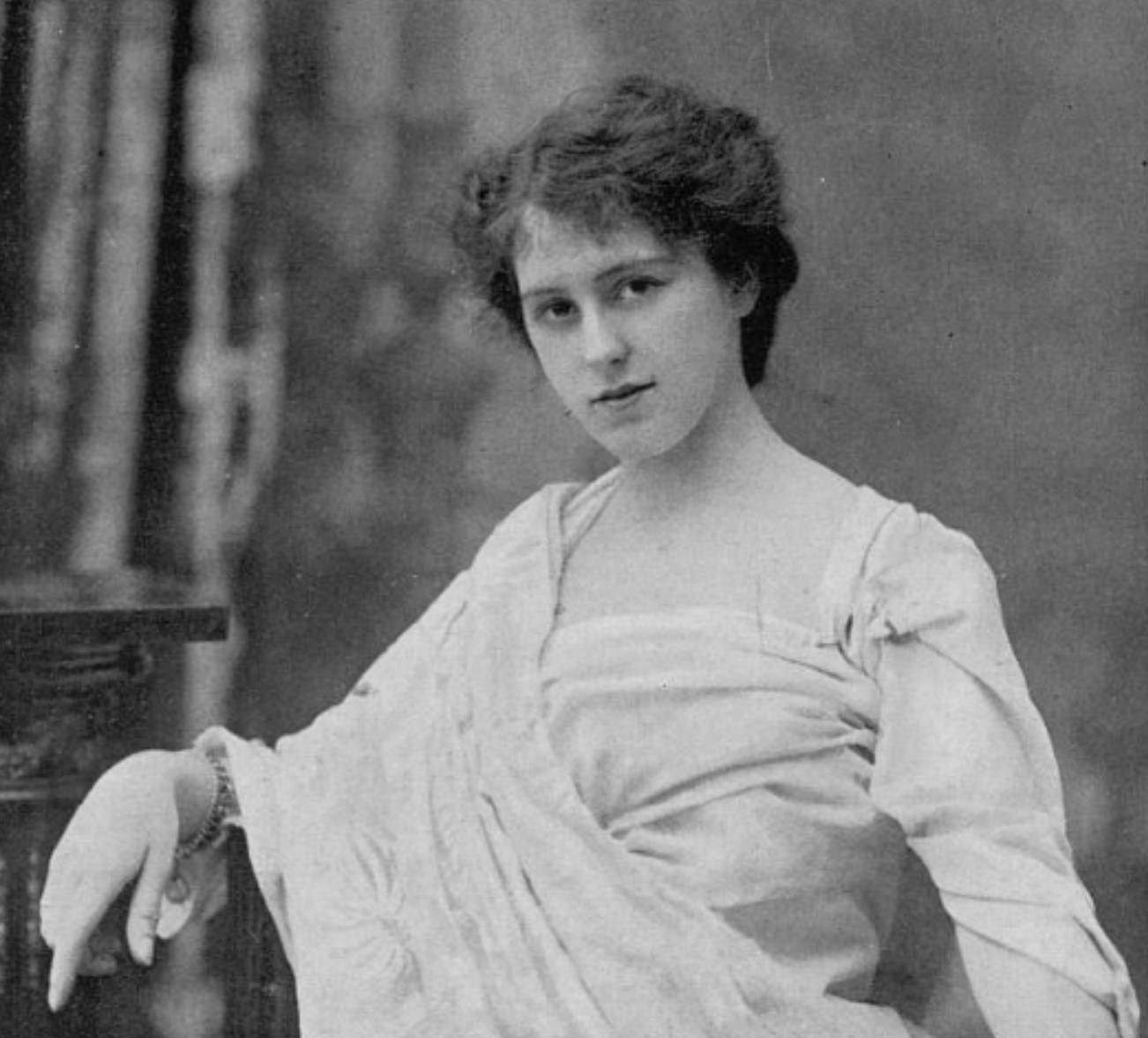
- Born: Blanche Arnold Hameen Nicol; 14 August 1881; Buenos Aires, Argentina
- Occupations: Actress; dancer; singer
- Years active: 1897–after 1909
- Spouse: William Edward Mitchell
- Children: 2

Ruby Ray (born Blanche Arnold Hameen Nicol, 14 August 1881 – after 1973) was an Argentine-born English actress, dancer and singer who performed mainly in Edwardian musical comedy.

Ray began her acting career in London in 1897 despite the misgivings of her late father's family. She played in both musical comedies and drama before travelling to Australia in 1900. There she starred in the play A Message from Mars and the musical Three Little Maids, among other pieces. She later appeared in London and New York, creating supporting roles in The Catch of the Season (1904) and The Belle of Mayfair (1906).

She married in 1909 and left the stage, living with her husband and children in Ceylon, then Switzerland, and later Jersey.

== Early life ==
Ray was born in Buenos Aires to a Scottish father, James Watson Nicol, and an English mother, Blanche Caunter. Her paternal grandfather was the figure and genre painter Erskine Nicol, and her maternal grandfather was the writer and clergyman John Hobart Caunter. Her parents married at Morro Velho, Brazil; her older brother Erskine was also born in Buenos Aires. Her father, a planter who ran the estancia La Aroma southeast of Buenos Aires, drowned at Altamirano just over two months after her birth. The family relocated to England, where they lived in Kensington, London. Ray was often ill as a child and also experienced bouts of illness in adulthood. As a young woman, she enjoyed painting, needlework and punting on the Thames, and was fond of animals of all kinds.

== Career ==
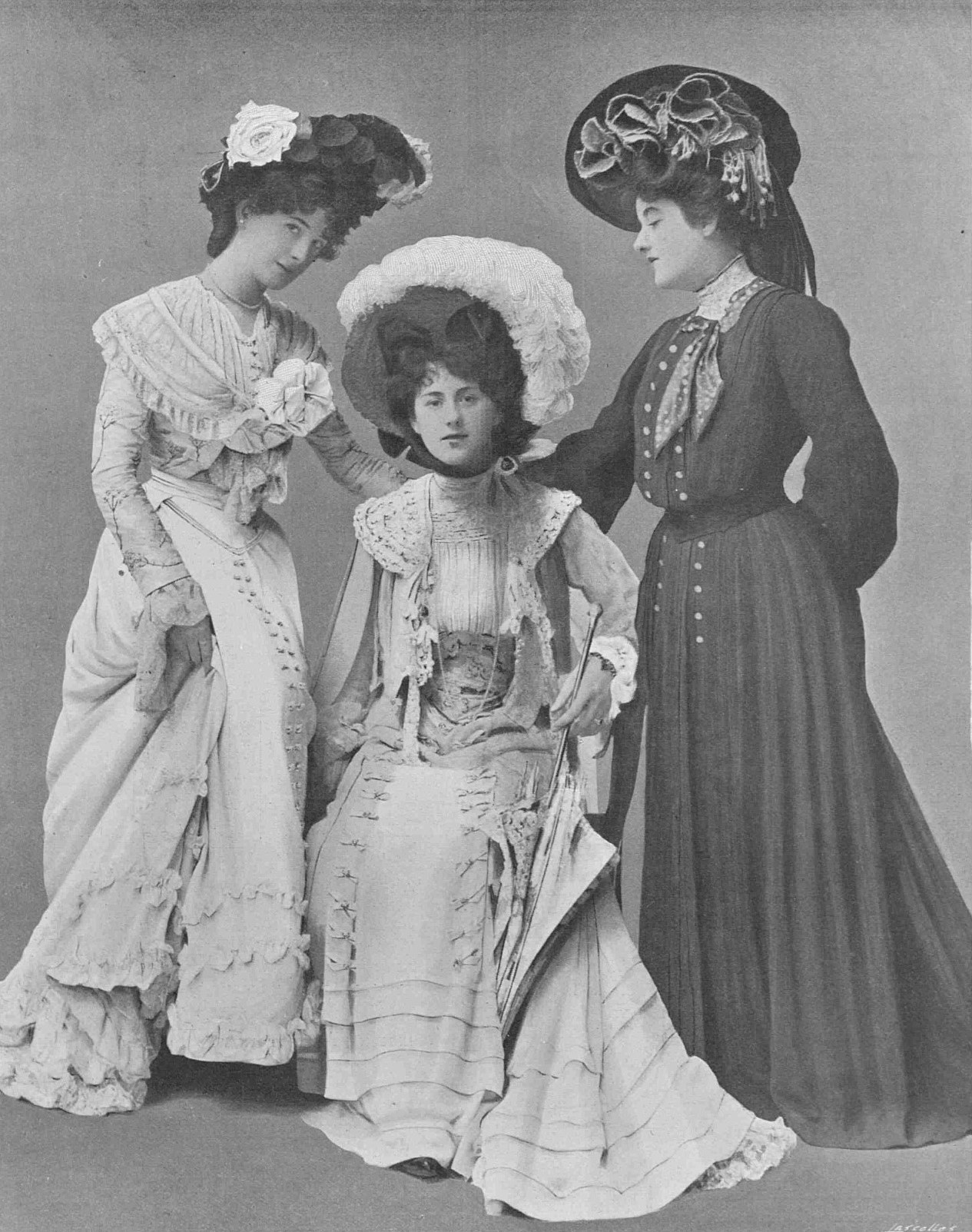
Ruby Ray (centre) with Millie Legarde (L) and Betty Belknap (R) in Three Little Maids at the Apollo, 1902

Ray first appeared in London at the age of sixteen in late 1897, initially as a chorus dancer, and moved on quickly to solo dancing, singing and eventually acting. She studied dancing with John D'Auban. She adopted the stage name Ruby Ray to keep her real name out of the press, as her Scottish paternal family regarded the theatre "with a holy horror" and objected to her choosing the stage for a profession. Her ambition was to work up from musical comedy and pantomime to high comedy. She secured the dramatic role of Lucius in Herbert Beerbohm Tree's revival of Julius Caesar (1900). After the run of this drama she was engaged by George Edwardes, the father of Edwardian musical comedy. An early favourite part of hers was Iris, initially played by Letty Lind, in Edwardes' Gaiety Comedy A Greek Slave.

She became interested in seeing Australia because "all England was talking of the Australians and their pluck in South Africa." She travelled to Australia in 1900 as leading lady of the Hawtrey Comedy Company, which was managed by William F. Hawtrey, the brother of actor-manager Charles Hawtrey. On her travels she was chaperoned by her mother, "a lady as pleasant and bright as her daughter", from whom she was inseparable, according to one interviewer. Mrs Nicol, however, took precautions not to be overbearing and left all business decisions to her daughter. After touring Australia, Ray went to New York, where she played in several successes.

Her roles included Minnie Templar in A Message from Mars (1900), Lady Marjory Crichton and Ada Branscombe in Three Little Maids (1902) – both comedies that met with great success in Australia, Daisy Armitage in Tom, Dick and Harry (1901), Mrs Gillibrand in In the Soup (1901), Lady Violet in A Pantomime Rehearsal, the Duchess of St. Jermyns in The Catch of the Season (1904), Lady Rosaline in The Belle of Mayfair (1906), Jill in Little Bo-Peep (1908) and Rosie Jocelyn in Saucy Sally. Other plays in which she appeared include A Highland Legacy (1901), The School Girl (1903) and Divorcons (1907). Among the plays in which she appeared in America were in the Charles Frohman production of The Dairymaids, composed by Paul A. Rubens (1907), in New York, in which she was Lady Brudenell, and Three Twins (1908) in New York and Detroit, in which she played the leading part of Molly Somers. She played Mrs. Newlywed in The Newlyweds and Their Baby in Toronto in 1908 and on Broadway the next year.

Ray called acting "the only thing I have an ounce of talent for". Once, she played for six weeks with an injured toe: "It was not so bad while I was dancing, but when I walked I felt excruciating pains." Another time, a limelight burst near her, and her clothes were burned into holes, but she escaped without injury. In 1903–04 she was ill for seven months. After her marriage in 1909, she retired from acting. In 1917, however, she made a reappearance on a concert platform in Ceylon for patriotic purposes.

== Reception ==
One interviewer noted that in private, Ray had "a specially winning manner" and appeared "to make friends with all who meet her." Another commented that she had a "girlish, unassuming manner, and a pair of beautiful soft brown eyes", as well as being "Tall and willowy, of slender, girlish proportions, graceful, undulating movements, and gentle, courteous manners". He noted that "Miss Ray's bright manner and personal attractions" might "have something to do with her rapid advancement. It is also well known that she is a beautiful dancer; has a sweet, singing voice, and a certain taking archness in using it." In 1901, The Otago Witness called her "undoubtedly the best lead that has visited Australia for many years", while The Bendigo Independent in that year wrote that she had "already made her name in London and America. She is described as a charming and graceful young actress, gifted with great histrionic abilities, and is credited by the English and American critics as being one of the best artistes of the day."

== Marriage, family life and death ==
In 1906, Ray, who was living in Marylebone, and Frederic de Courcy Helbert from Slough, applied for a marriage license. It appears, however, that the marriage never took place. In 1909, she married the Ceylonese merchant William Edward Mitchell whose father, Sir William Wilson Mitchell, had introduced the cotton industry into Ceylon. Their daughter, Hameen Mary Caunter, was born in 1911 and their son, William Hamish, in 1919. The family lived in Ceylon into the 1920s, when they moved to Montreux, Switzerland, to have their children educated. They subsequently went to live in Jersey. Evacuated from Jersey during the Second World War, Ray and her husband returned there after the war. William died at their home, Broadlands, in Grouville in 1952, and Ray died after 1973.
