= Evie Greene =

English actress and singer (1875–1917)

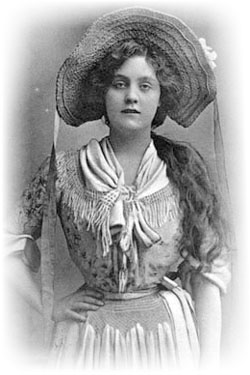
Greene in A Country Girl

Edith Elizabeth "Evie" Greene (14 January 1875 – 11 September 1917) was a much-photographed English actress and singer who played in Edwardian musical comedies in London and on Broadway. She starred as Dolores in the international hit musical Florodora. She also sang on the world's first original cast album, recorded for that musical.

== Life and career ==
Greene was born at 82 Fratton Road in Portsmouth, England, in 1875 (the 1881 census gives her age as 6). She was the daughter of Richard Bentley Greene, a retired naval officer, and his wife Edith. The 1891 census states that she was a sixteen-year-old "teacher of music".

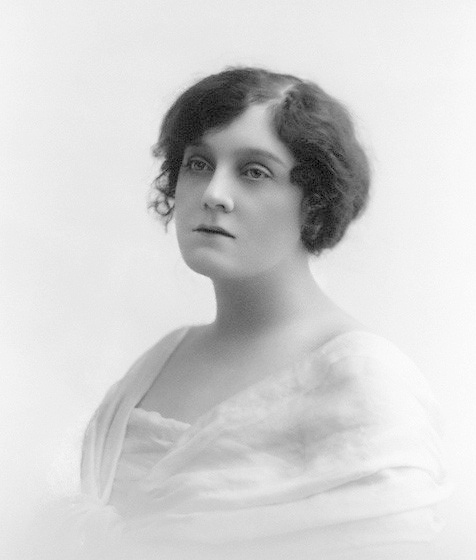
Image from the National Portrait Gallery

While a young teenager, Greene began her career as a dancer in a touring production of Walter Slaughter's medieval comic opera Marjorie. In her early career, she starred in pantomime in the provinces. She went on to star in hit musicals, most notably Florodora at the Lyric Theatre in London beginning in 1899, as well as the title roles in Kitty Grey in 1900 and 1901 (Apollo Theatre), also starring Mabel Love and Edna May, A Country Girl in 1903 (at Daly's Theatre), as Madame Sans-Gene in The Duchess of Dantzic in 1903 (at the Lyric Theatre) and in 1905 on Broadway, and as Molly Montrose in The Little Cherub in 1906 (Prince of Wales's Theatre), with Lily Elsie, Gabrielle Ray and Zena Dare.

Greene sang the role of the Plaintiff in a 1902 benefit performance of Trial by Jury, alongside Hayden Coffin and the D'Oyly Carte Opera Company stars, with Lionel Monckton playing the mute role of the Associate. She also starred in operettas; besides The Duchess of Dantzic, these included Les Merveilleuses in 1906 at Daly's Theatre in London, and L'Amour Mouillé at the Lyric Theatre. She also starred in the successful Havana in 1908 at the Gaiety Theatre, London.

Greene appeared in 1915 in a revival of Florodora, earning good notices, and performed through 1916, at least as late as 22 November of that year, at the London Palladium.

She married twice: first in 1896 to Richard Temple, Jr., the son of the D'Oyly Carte principal bass, Richard Temple (divorced – abandonment), and then in 1910 to Captain Ernest Kennaway Arbuthnot. Her nephew was the actor Richard Greene, best known for playing Robin Hood in the 1950s British TV series The Adventures of Robin Hood.

Greene died at the age of 42 at her parents' home at Parnholt, Southsea, Hampshire. Her husband became Chief Constable of Oxfordshire in 1921, remarried and fathered children.
