= Paul Rubens (disambiguation) =

Paul Rubens (1875–1917) was an English songwriter and librettist.

== See also ==
- Paul Reubens (1952–2023), American actor, writer, film producer, and comedian
- Peter Paul Rubens (1577–1640), Flemish Baroque painter
