= Lady Madcap =

Edwardian musical comedy composed by Paul Rubens

Cover of vocal score

Lady Madcap is an Edwardian musical comedy in two acts, composed by Paul Rubens with a book by Paul Rubens and Nathaniel Newnham-Davis, and lyrics by Paul Rubens and Percy Greenbank. The story concerns a mischievous Earl's daughter who holds a ball at her father's castle without permission, pretends to be her own maid, and causes general confusion.

The musical was first performed at the Prince of Wales Theatre, London, on 17 December 1904, under the management of George Edwardes, garnering highly favourable reviews. It ran for 354 performances, nearly a year, closing in November 1905. It starred Adrienne Augarde in the title role, and G. P. Huntley as Trouper Smith. Various changes were made to the cast during the run. Among those who appeared in the piece were Zena Dare, Lily Elsie, Gabrielle Ray and Marie Studholme. It then toured in the British provinces, starring Studholme.

In 1906 it ran on Broadway at the Casino Theatre as My Lady's Maid with Madge Crichton in the title role. It also received an Australian production.

== Synopsis ==
Setting: Framlingham Castle

Lady Betty, the daughter of an Earl, Lord Framlingham, is an innocent-looking but mischievous girl. Without her father's knowledge, she has invited the officers of the East Anglian Hussars to their home, Egbert Castle, for a day and night of entertainment. She forges two telegrams that send her father into town on some urgent political pretext and later his butler to follow him. Her father wisely locks her in her room during his absence, but her friend, Gwenny, and lady's maid, Susan, secures a ladder to help her to escape from the window.

Although she detests wealth, Lady Betty is interested in a rich, eccentric young trooper, who calls himself Smith, and whose prowess at cricket have caught her eye. She disguises herself as a servant, and has Gwenny impersonate her, so that she can get close to Smith. Meanwhile, two men from the village, attracted by the Earl's advertisement for a rich man to court his daughter, arrive at the castle and mistake each of Gwenny and Susan for Lady Betty; they are both impostors pretending to be wealthy. Betty flirts with Smith and persuades him to pretend to be the butler, which he does, donning the butler's uniform.

Class distinctions disappear that evening at the servants' ball as the officers enjoy the entertainment and company of servants and gentry alike. Betty continues her flirtations with Smith and is well-pleased with the progress of her elaborate mischief. Lord Framlingham returns angrily but is soothed that his daughter's suitor is, at least, rich. The impostors are discovered, and all ends happily.

== Roles and original cast ==
- Count de St. Hubert – Maurice Farkoa
- Bill Stratford (known as Stony Stratford) – Aubrey Fitzgerald
- Posh Jenkins (his confederate) – Fred Emney
- Colonel Layton (of the East Anglian Hussars) – Leedham Bantock
- Major Blatherswaite (of the East Anglian Hussars) – Dennis Eadie
- Captain Harrington (of the East Anglian Hussars) – J. Edward Fraser
- Lieutenant Somerset (of the East Anglian Hussars) – Spencer Trevor
- Lord Framlingham – Herbert Sparling
- Corporal Ham (of the East Anglian Hussars) – George Carroll
- Palmer (butler to Lord Framlingham) – Roy St. George
- Old Huntsman – Richard Kavanagh
- Trooper Smith (of the East Anglian Hussars) – G. P. Huntley
- Gwenny Holden (friend of Lady Betty) – Delia Mason; later Nina Sevening and Lily Elsie
- Susan (lady's-maid to Lady Betty) – Eva Sandford; later Mabel Russell and Gabrielle Ray
- Mrs. Layton (Colonel Layton's wife) – Blanche Massey
- Lady Betty Clarridge (Lord Framlingham's daughter – The "Madcap") – Adrienne Augarde; later Madge Crichton, Zena Dare and Marie Studholme

Sources: The Times J. P. Wearing and the original vocal score by Chappel & Co. (1905)

== Musical numbers ==
Act I – Garden at Egbert Castle.

- No. 1. Chorus – "We're simple rustic folk, we are" (composed by Howard Talbot)
- No. 2. Octet – Footmen and Housemaids – "We're flunkeys high and haughty"
- No. 3. Gwenny – "Pretty Primrose"
- No. 4. Lady Betty and Gwenny – "Grace and Disgrace"
- No. 5. Entrance of Yeomanry – "Here they are, don't you see?"
- No. 6. Harrington and Chorus – "A way we have in the Army"
- No. 7. Chorus – "Can this be true? We're fill'd with consternation"
- No. 8. Bill and Posh – "Ow do you do, if you please?"
- No. 9. Susan – "Nerves"
- No. 10. Comte – "Do I like love?"
- No. 11. Lady Betty and Girls – "My lady's maid"
- No. 12. Chorus of Girls – "Archery"
- No. 13. Comte and Gwenny – "My Comtesse"
- No. 14. Finale Act I – "Oh! I am the pet of Mayfair"

Act II – Hall at Egbert Castle.

- No. 15. Gwenny – "Who? Who? Who?"
- No. 16. Chorus of Page-Boys – "We're pert little, plump little page-boys"
- No. 17. Betty – "Her little dog"
- No. 18. Susan – "I don't seem to want you when you're with me"
- No. 19. Comte – "I like you in velvet"
- No. 20. Susan and Chorus – "The Missis"
- No. 21. Octet – "Leap Year"
- No. 22. Betty and Chorus – "In Scarlet Uniform"
- No. 23. Colonel and Chorus – "The beetle and the Boot"
- No. 24. Comte and Smith – "I loved her"
- No. 25. Finale Act II – "See me in a scarlet uniform, as I go marching down the street"

Addendum

- Susan and Ham – "Two Little Pigs"

== Reception ==
Reviewing the first night, the critic in The Observer commented that the piece was "a conspicuous success" and "fully up to the high standard we have been led to expect" from musical comedies presented by George Edwardes. There was praise for Rubens's music – "a high level of excellence" above the normal standard for the genre. The reviewer for The Times praised all the cast, singling out Adrienne Augarde as "a bright and mischievous Madcap", but commented that the main attraction for audiences was G. P. Huntley, for his comic performance in various disguises.

== In popular culture ==
The lyric of the song "I like you in velvet" was used by Malcolm McLaren in his song (on the same title) on his album Waltz Darling.

== Sources ==
- Wearing, J. P. The London Stage 1900–1909: A Calendar of Productions, Performers, and Personnel, Rowman & Littlefield (2013) ISBN 0-8108-9293-6
