= Fred Emney Sr =

English comedian and actor

Emney as a comic waiter in Shell Out!, 1915

Frederick Charles Emney (5 March 1865 – 7 January 1917), was an English comedian and actor, known for his appearances in farce, comic opera, musical comedy, music hall and pantomime. He was a member of a theatrical family: among his uncles was the popular comedian Arthur Williams, and he was the father of Fred Emney, a comic character actor frequently seen on stage and screen in the mid-20th century.

== Life and career ==
Emney was born in Islington, London. His family had theatrical connections; his uncles were the comic performers Arthur Williams and Fred Williams (c.1847–1916). Emney made his stage debut in 1885 at Sadler's Wells Theatre in a cast led by Nellie Farren. One of his earliest successes was as Lurcher, the sheriff's officer, in the comic opera Dorothy, succeeding Arthur Williams in the role; the uncle played it more than 900 times, and the nephew made over 800 appearances in it. A provincial critic wrote in 1888, "Mr Emney is a born humorist, and he enters into the spirit of the thing with such abandon as keeps the house in a round of merriment during his presence". Theatre historian Roy Busby described him as "an outstanding burlesque comedian."

For the rest of his career Emney divided his time between the West End and touring. His shows in the 1890s included the farcical comedies The Barrister at the Royalty Theatre, London; and The Bookmaker on tour with Arthur Williams. His pantomime roles at the Theatre Royal, Drury Lane included Nurse in The Sleeping Beauty and the Beast in 1900–1901, Mayor in Mother Goose in 1902–1903 and Empress in Sinbad, 1906–1907. The West End musical comedy roles that he originated included Posh Jenkins in Lady Madcap (1904), Tournesol in The Merveilleuses (1906) and Nervy Nat in The Gay Gordons (1907).

From 1907 Emney began to appear in music hall shows, in a long-running sketch A Sister to Assist 'er, which he played around the country, first with Sydney Fairbrother and later with Louise Tinsley. After touring the sketch for three years he followed it with a sequel, The Arrival of a Rival, which was still in his repertoire at the time of his death. In 1913 he was among the performers in a celebrated all-star royal variety show at the London Coliseum organised for charity by Sarah Bernhardt. In 1914 he received warm notices for his portrayal of the Empress in Sinbad opposite George Robey.

During a performance of a pantomime version of Cinderella at the London Opera House in 1917, Emney slipped on stage, fell heavily and damaged his spine, and despite two emergency operations he died a few days later, at the age of 51. His son, Fred Emney Jr., was chief mourner at the funeral, which was attended by members of Emney's profession, led by George Graves and Harry Tate.
