= Marie Studholme =

English actress and singer (1872–1930)

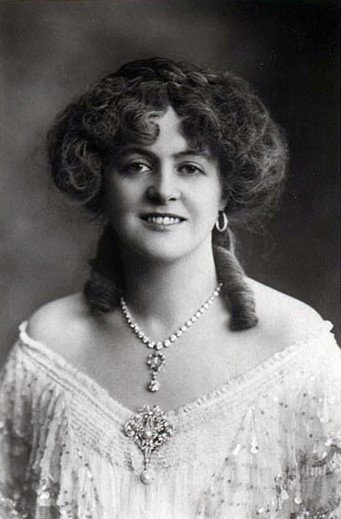
- Studholme c. 1900
- Born: Caroline Maria Lupton; 10 September 1872; Eccleshill, Bradford, West Yorkshire, England
- Died: 10 March 1930 (aged 57); Hampstead, London, England
- Occupations: Edwardian musical comedy actress and singer
- Spouses: Gilbert Porteous (m. 1891, divorced) Harold Giles Borrett (m. 1908)
- Children: 1

Caroline Maria Lupton (10 September 1872 – 10 March 1930), known professionally as Marie Studholme, was an English actress and singer of the Victorian and Edwardian eras, known for her supporting and sometimes starring roles in Edwardian musical comedy. Her attractive features made her one of the most popular postcard beauties of her day.

Studholme's theatre career spanned from 1891 to 1915. She was one of producer George Edwardes' famous Gaiety Girls and originated several roles in musical comedies. Studholme toured widely in the British provinces and abroad in shows that had enjoyed successful London productions, and she became extremely popular in the British provinces. She ended her career in music hall comedy sketches. After her retirement from the stage, she fostered a boy and adopted a girl.

== Early life ==
Studholme was born in Eccleshill, Bradford, West Yorkshire, England, the only child of Joseph Ludholme Lupton, an auctioneer, and his wife Emma Greaves. She was raised in Baildon by her mother, her paternal grandparents and in Shipley by her father's two half-sisters, one being Mrs. Frank Rhodes, and educated at Salt Grammar School on the Saltaire mill estate. She became interested in theatre while still at school.

== Career ==
She joined her mother in London and started her stage career in 1891 at the Lyric Theatre in London in the chorus of Edmond Audran's operetta La Cigale and, at the same theatre in early 1892, was in the chorus of The Mountebanks, where she met her future husband, actor Gilbert Porteous, who was playing the role of Beppo. Charles Wyndham asked her to join his company at the Criterion Theatre in 1892. She appeared as Rhea Porter in the musical comedy Morocco Bound at the Shaftesbury Theatre in 1893, where she came to the attention of the manager George Edwardes, the leading promoter of Edwardian musical comedy. Edwardes's musicals, beginning at this time, would feature his popular chorus line of glamorous yet respectable Gaiety Girls. Edwardes engaged Studholme to play the small role of Gladys Stourton, one of these Gaiety Girls, in the hit musical A Gaiety Girl (1893) at the Prince of Wales Theatre, and when the piece transferred to Daly's Theatre in 1894, she was promoted to the title role.

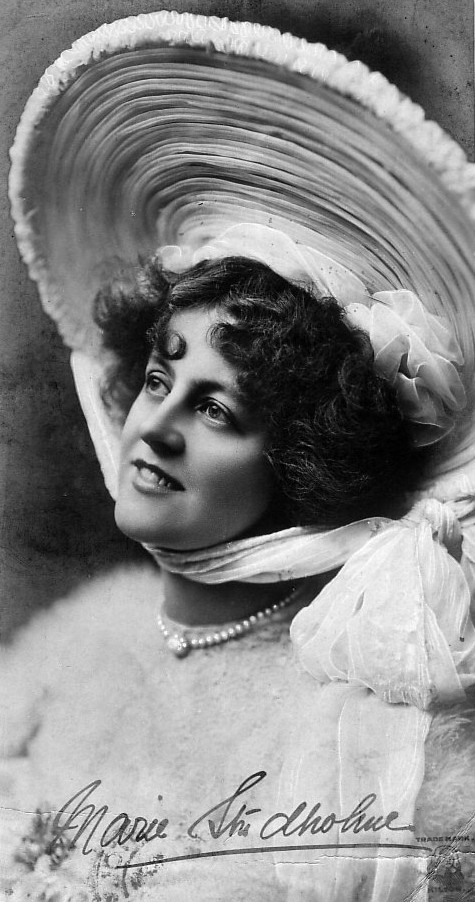
Studholme c. 1900

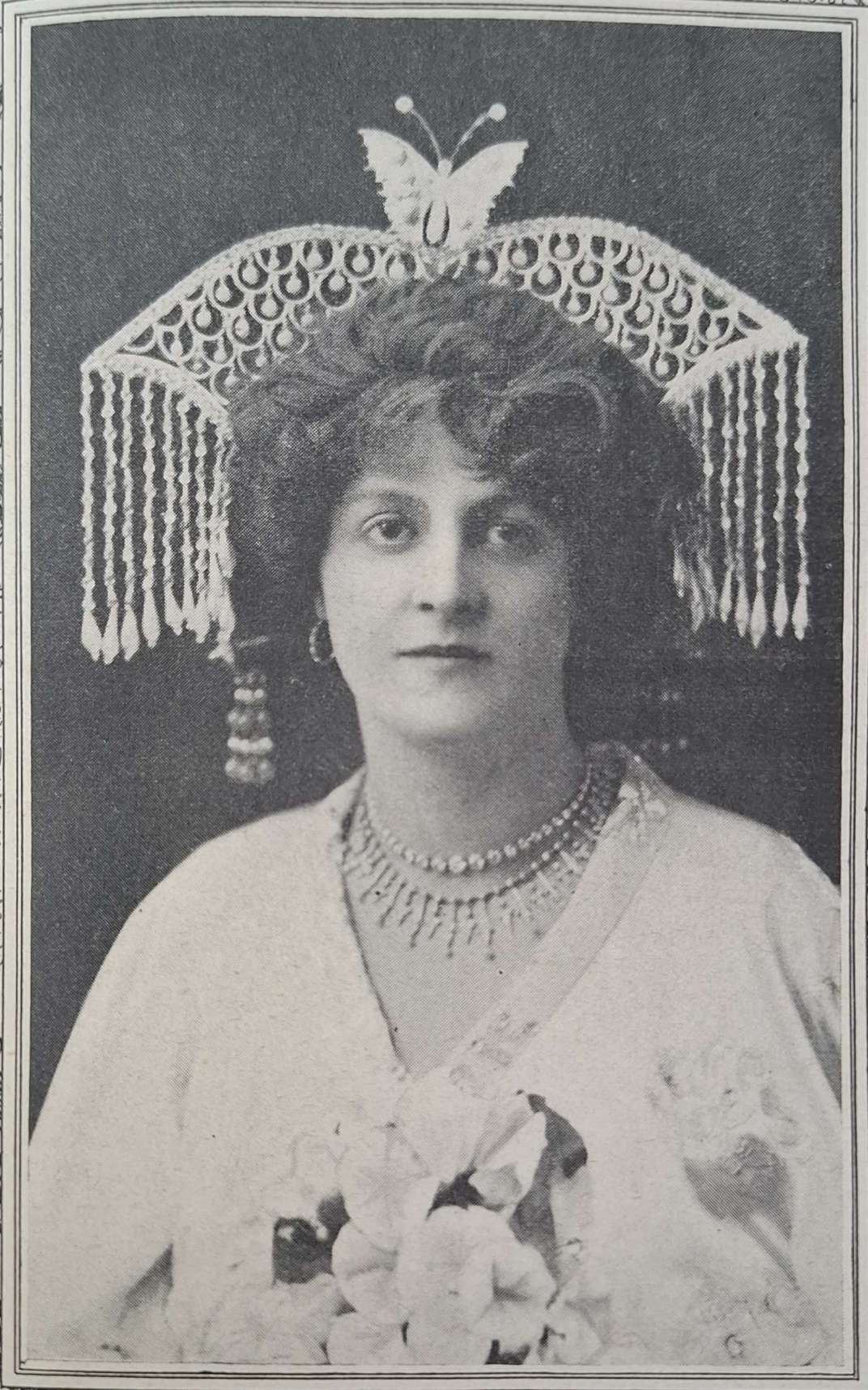
Photo of Studholme in the Black & White Budget, 8 December 1900

After that, she played a series of roles for Edwardes in London and on tour. She understudied Letty Lind as Daisy Vane in An Artist's Model, eventually taking over the role and recreating it in the New York production in 1895. In 1897 she toured the United States with Edwardes' Gaiety company. She also appeared on Broadway in a revival of In Town in 1897. Studholme succeeded Marie Tempest in 1899 in the title role of San Toy on tour in the British provinces. In 1900 she took over the role of Nora from Violet Lloyd in The Messenger Boy at the Gaiety Theatre, London, where she enjoyed great success with the wartime song hit, "When the boys come home once more".

In 1901, she created the role of Dora Selby in the London production of The Toreador. She also created the role of Cicely Marchmont in The School Girl in 1903. In 1904, she played Josephine Zaccary in The Orchard, Part Two, in London and the title role in a revival of The Geisha. At Prince's Theatre, in Bristol, she appeared in San Toy in 1903–1904 and in Lady Madcap in 1905–1906. The petite Studholme sometimes played juvenile roles, for example the title role in Alice in Wonderland in a West End revival in 1906. In 1906-1907 in Southampton, she appeared in My Darling. She again took the title role in a 1906-07 revival of Lady Madcap and then played Joy Blossom in My Darling (1907). She starred in the title role in Miss Hook of Holland on a long provincial tour from 1907 to 1910. She then played Paulette in My Mimosa Maid. Studholme toured in South Africa during 1910 to 1911.

By 1913, Studholme was appearing in music hall comedy sketches, including one entitled "Her Ladyship", at the Wood Green Empire in London, and touring in variety shows. She had great success and popularity in the British provinces, and returned triumphantly to Bradford to perform at the opening of the town's Alhambra music-hall in 1914. Studholme retired from the stage in 1915.

== Personal life ==
Amid the demands of a busy theatre schedule, Studholme found time in 1907 to study Jujitsu with Yukio Tani. She married Porteous in 1891, and the marriage ended in divorce. She was married again on 4 September 1908 to Harold Giles Borrett, four years her junior, the son of Major-General Herbert Charles Borrett, who courted her under an assumed name. Studholme had no children of her own. She fostered Peter Lupino and then around 1916 adopted Jill (Granddaughter of Eardley Norton, former Attorney General of Madras), who was four years younger than Lupino. Borrett was not fond of the children, but he suffered them as he was dependent on Studholme's considerable wealth. He never worked.

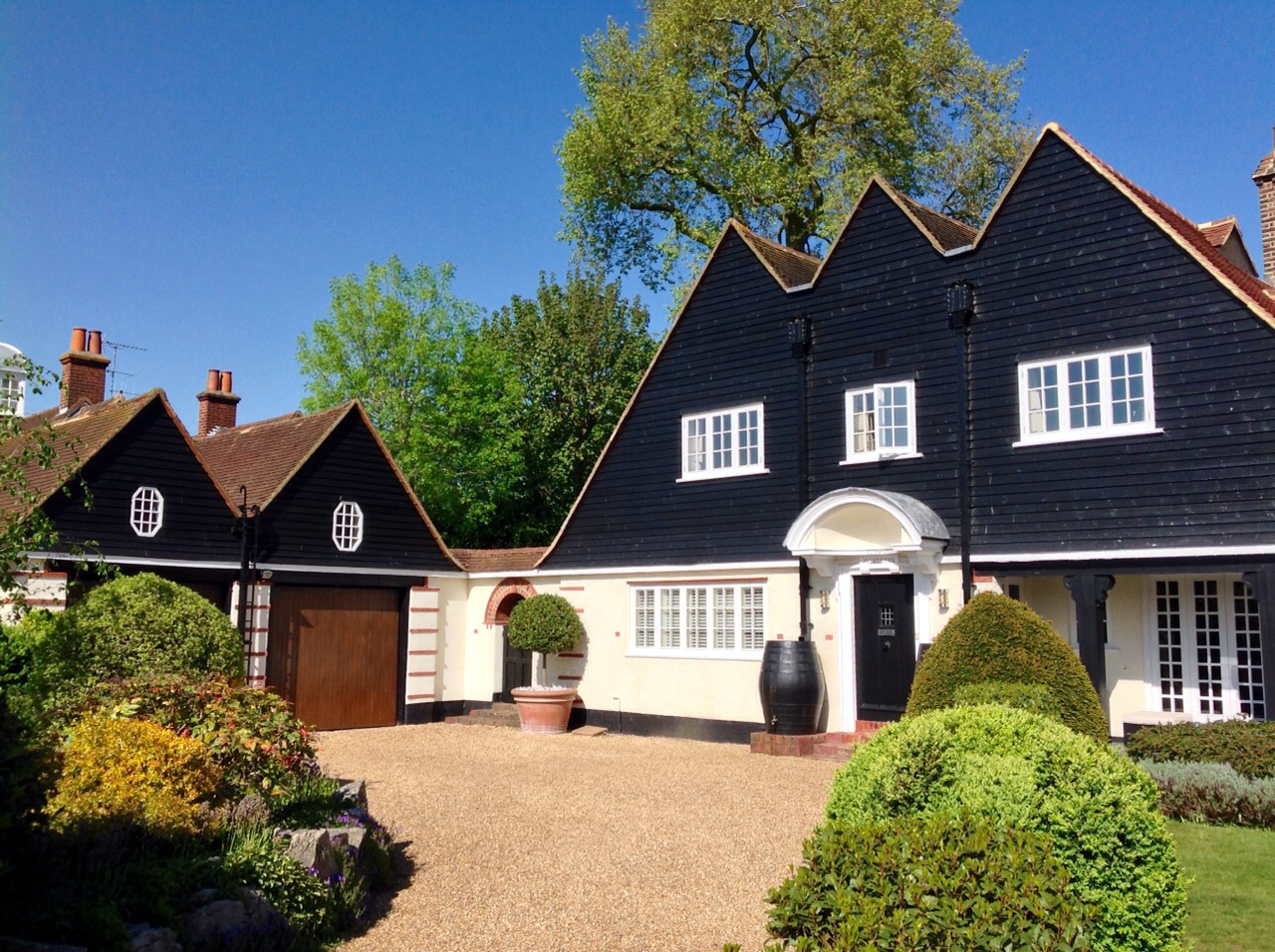
The Barn, Laleham, designed in 1909

Studholme loved animals and was often photographed with them. She reportedly charged a sixpence to autograph her postcards and gave the proceeds to animal and theatrical charities. In 1904, Studholme brought and won a lawsuit against Edward Foley, a London dentist, who altered her photographic image for use in an advertisement without permission. She converted to Christian Science and lived out her retirement in Hampstead and Laleham where, in 1909, the young Architect Edward Maufe designed a weekend house for her. She called the house 'The Barn', possibly after the Dutch Barn in the musical Miss Hook of Holland. Studholme Court, a council block, was later built on part of the site of the garden of Studholme's former Hampstead home, off the Finchley Road.

Studholme died at her home in London in March 1930 from a short but virulent attack of rheumatic fever, at the age of 57, and was buried in the St Marylebone Cemetery in East Finchley, survived by her second husband and children. She left an estate valued at £58,303, which in 2024 is worth over £4.75 million.

On 10 March 2012 The Music Hall Guild of Great Britain and America erected a commemorative blue plaque at Studholme's last home in Hampstead, and restored her memorial at St. Marylebone Cemetery in East Finchley.

== Selected productions ==
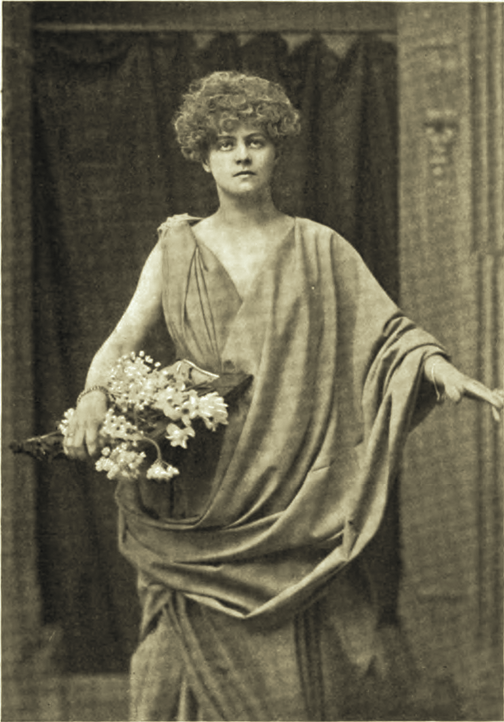
Studholme in 1896

- Daisy Vane in An Artist's Model. Studholme originated the role in the New York production at the Broadway Theatre on 23 December 1895, having played it as a replacement in London.
- In Town, 1897 in New York.
- The title role in San Toy on tour in 1899.
- Nora in The Messenger Boy at the Gaiety Theatre in 1900.
- Dora Selby in The Toreador, 1901.
- Cicely Marchmont in The School Girl, at the Prince of Wales Theatre, London, in 1903.
- Josephine Zaccary in The Orchard, Part Two (1904).
- The title role in The Geisha (1904 revival).
- The title role in Alice in Wonderland in 1906.
- The title role in a 1906-07 revival of Lady Madcap.
- Joy Blossom in My Darling (1907).
- The title role in Miss Hook of Holland, 1907 and afterwards, in a role she played extensively.
- Paulette in My Mimosa Maid, 1909.
