= G. P. Huntley Jr. =

American film actor

George P. Huntley Jr. (26 February 1904 – 26 June 1971), born Bruce Francis Timothy Huntley in Boston and often credited as G. P. Huntley Jr., was an American film actor. He was the son of stage actor G. P. Huntley, and played alongside Errol Flynn in The Charge of the Light Brigade (1936), Another Dawn (1937), and They Died with Their Boots On (1941).

He also made occasional appearances on the musical stage, such as in Gay Divorce.
