= Betty (musical) =

- Betty and Gerald
- Music: Paul Rubens; Ernest Steffan
- Lyrics: Adrian Ross; Paul Rubens
- Book: Frederick Lonsdale; Gladys Unger
- Productions: 1914 Manchester; 1915 West End; 1916 Broadway

Betty is an Edwardian musical comedy in three acts, with a book by Frederick Lonsdale and Gladys Unger, music by Paul Rubens and Ernest Steffan, and lyrics by Adrian Ross and Rubens. It was first produced at the Prince's Theatre in Manchester, opening on December 24, 1914, then at Daly's Theatre in London, managed by George Edwardes, opening on April 24, 1915 and running for 391 performances. It also played at the Globe Theater in New York, opening on October 3, 1916. The show then enjoyed various tours and revivals. Gabrielle Ray joined the cast in 1915 as Estelle.

== Roles and original cast ==
- Gerard, The Earl of Beverley - Donald Calthrop
- The Duke of Crowborough - C. M. Lowne
- The Hon. Victor Halifax - Arthur Wellesley
- Charles Otway - Alfred S. Barber
- Lathers - Frank Perfitt
- Hillier - Charles F. Cooke
- Cedric - Cecil Fletcher
- Alf - Cyril Doughty
- Achille Jotte (Court Dressmaker) - W. H. Berry
- Lord Playne - G. P. Huntley
- Chicquette - Isabel Delorme
- Estelle - Mabel Sealby
- Lady Playne - Madeline Seymour
- David Playne (Lord Playne's Nephew) - Daisy Burrell
- Mrs. Rawlins - Kate Welch
- Jane - Modesta Daly
- Betty - Winifred Barnes

== Synopsis ==
Act I finale

Gerard, the Earl of Beverley, a philanderer, has pushed his father, The Duke of Crowborough, to the limit. The Duke storms into his son's home demanding that the younger man settle down with a wife and take on some responsibility. The young Earl, drunk and embarrassed in front of his friends, proposes to Betty, a kitchen maid, to spite his father. Gerard has no intention of following his father's wishes and makes plans to send Betty away and to continue with his profligate lifestyle. But the Duke is a step ahead of his son: He gives Gerard's allowance to his wife, Betty, so that Gerard must depend upon her. The charming Betty manages to become accepted by the society into which she has married and eventually charms her way into the heart of her wayward husband. He returns to her of his own accord and they find happiness.

== Musical numbers ==
David (top), Estelle and Jotte

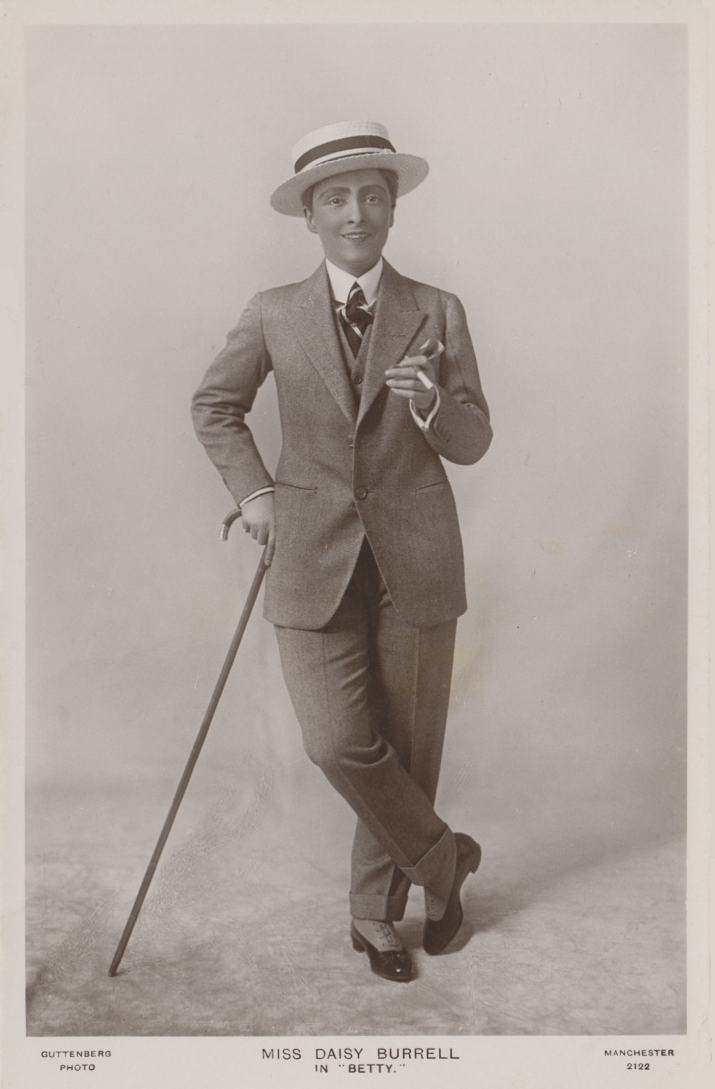
Daisy Burrell as David Playne

Act I - The Earl of Beverley's House in Regent's Park, London

- No. 1 - Chorus - "Oh, his Lordship rather keeps things up, they come to sup, lots of ladies and of noblemen..."
- No. 2 - Betty & Alf - "Let's pretend some fairy has granted our wishes..."
- No. 3 - Gerard, Chicquette & Dolly - "Oh, girls, isn't it a score ... Isn't it a score? ... I'm a bachelor! ..."
- No. 4 - Jotte, with Alf - "I started bus'ness on six bob a week ..."
- No. 5 - Finale Act I - Betty - "It was a little kitchen-maid, beside the fire one night she stayed..."

Act II - The Garden of the Earl of Beverley's House (next morning)

- No. 6 - Introduction & "Betty" Barcarolle.
- No. 7 - Unaccompanied Madrigal - Eight Household Servants - "All day long I roll the lawn, and a very long roll it is..."
- No. 8 - Gerard - "It's a funny thought, how often in my life I've had breakfast all alone..."
- No. 9 - Jotte & Chorus - "Though you find me a bit severe when I am in my shop..."
- No. 10 - Gerard, David, Victor, Cedric & Men's Chorus - "Marriage is a thing that makes me nervous..."
- No. 11 - Betty & Chorus - "I have dream'd of the wonder of love, like a rainbow that arches above..."
- No. 12 - Estelle & Jotte - "When a fellow goes out walking with a dear delightful pet..."
- No. 13 - Betty & Gerard - "Suppose it was true that you loved me and I loved you..."
- No. 14 - David, Jotte & Playne - "A woman's too much for a man all alone..."
- No. 15 - Finale Act II - "What! You cannot really, truly mean to send her off so cruelly..."

Act III - Lord Playne's House, Farnham Towers

- No. 16 - Chorus & Dance - "Come away, have one more waltz with us now..."
- No. 17 - Jotte & Chorus - "If you'd have the fashionable figure in the very latest taste..."
- No. 18 - Estelle & Jotte - "There is a right side and a wrong to ev'rything, it seems to me..."
- No. 19 - Betty & Gerard - "It's a month since we parted; aren't you quite broken-hearted? ..."
- No. 20 - Finale Act III (includes a quiet section for dialogue)
