= G. P. Huntley =

Irish actor (1868–1927)

Huntley as Mr Hook in Miss Hook of Holland, 1908

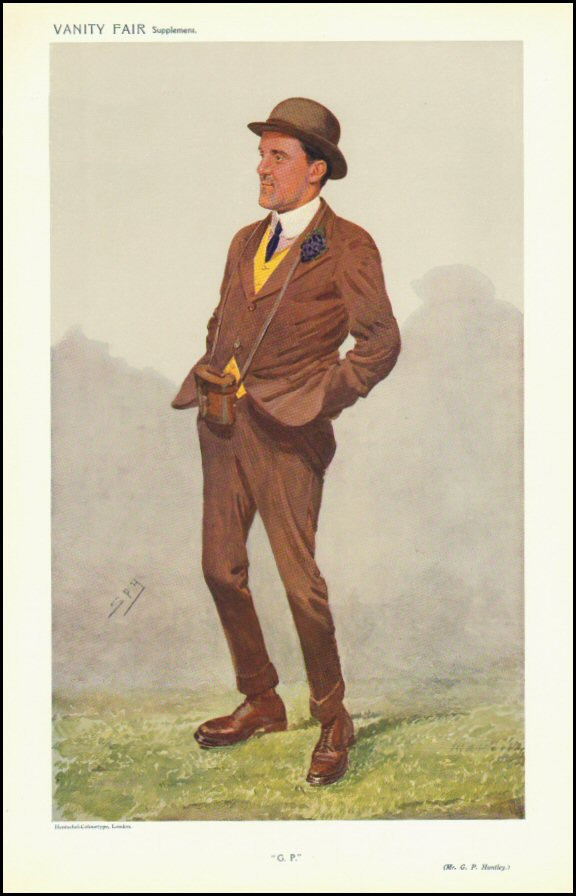
"G. P.", caricature by Spy in Vanity Fair in 1908

George Patrick Huntley (13 July 1868 – 21 September 1927), always billed as G. P. Huntley, was an Irish actor known for comic performances in the theatre and the music halls. Some of his best known roles were in the Edwardian musical comedies The Circus Girl, A Runaway Girl, Three Little Maids, The School Girl, Lady Madcap, Miss Hook of Holland and Betty. He was successful in appearances on Broadway, as well as in the West End. His son was the film actor G. P. Huntley Jr.

== Life and career ==
Huntley was born into a theatrical family in Fermoy, County Cork. He made his stage debut at the age of six as Pike Rich in Under the Gaslight, and toured for some years with the theatrical troupe of his father, Frank Huntley. Moving to England, Huntley played in melodramas in London and on tour. From 1882 to 1885, he played at the Adelphi Theatre, then at the Theatre Royal, Drury Lane in both drama and comedy. He joined the company of William and Madge Kendal, and went with them to New York in 1891. He remained with the Kendals for four years, in London and on three further US visits.

In 1901 he had his first major success in the West End, playing a "knut" role, Lord Plantagenet, in the Edwardian musical comedy Kitty Grey. In the view of The Times, other roles for which he was particularly celebrated were Lord Cheyne in Three Little Maids (1902), Sir Ormesby St-Leger in The School Girl (1903), and Mr Hook in Miss Hook of Holland (1908). In 1905 he played the Doctor in Passion, Poison, and Petrifaction. Other roles in musicals included Sir Titus in The Circus Girl (1897), A Runaway Girl (1899), Trooper Smith in Lady Madcap (1904), the title characters in Mr. Popple of Ippleton (1905) and The Hon'ble Phil (1908), Victor in My Mimosa Maid (1908), and Lord Playne in Betty (1915). In the music halls he worked with his wife, Eva Kelly, in comic sketches, such as "Buying a Gun", "Selling a Pup" and "The Fairy Glen Laundry".

He was almost as well known in the US as in the UK, making regular Broadway appearances before and after the First World War, including the New York runs of some of his musicals, as well as Eccles in the play Caste (1910), Hitchy-Koo of 1920, Sir George in The Second Mrs. Tanqueray (1924) and Sir Francis in a 1926 adaptation of Gentlemen Prefer Blondes.

Huntley married Evangeline (Eva) Margaret Kelly, an actress 12 years his junior, on 29 January 1902 at St Nicholas, Thames Ditton; they were engaged during the run of Kitty Grey. The couple had three children, but only one, the film actor G. P. Huntley Jr., survived to adulthood.

Huntley died on 21 September 1927 at the age of 59, in a London nursing home, after suffering from jaundice. He was buried at St Nicholas on 24 September.
