= Clarita Vidal =

Edwardian musical comedies actress (1883–1919)

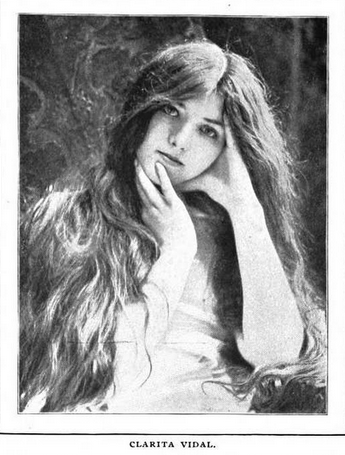
- Clarita Vidal, from a 1903 publication
- Born: 20 January 1883
- Died: 17 June 1919 (aged 36)
- Other names: Comtesse de Gaaverda; Mme. Daisy Mazzuchi; Countess Chiquita Mazzuchi; Chick Mazzuchi
- Occupation: Actress
- Spouses: Lord Seymour; E. G. Mazzuchi (m. 1909; div. 1917)
- Children: 1

Clarita Vidal (20 January 1883 – 17 June 1919) was an actress in Edwardian musical comedies, later known for her wartime work in Italy as Countess Chiquita Mazzuchi.

== Early life ==
Vidal's origins were unclear, even to herself. "I really don't know what my nationality is," she confessed to a reporter in 1901. She said she was born in Singapore, the daughter of a Spanish ambassador and an Englishwoman. Elsewhere she was described as a native of the "Sunny South", raised in Spanish diplomatic circles in Algiers, possibly as Chiquita Saavedra de Cervantes.

== Career ==
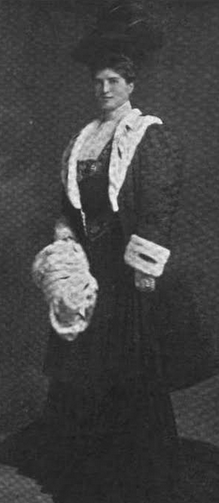
Clarita Vidal, from a 1909 publication.

Vidal was a Florodora girl, and counted among the "beauties" of the stage. Her Broadway appearances included roles in The Silver Slipper (1902–1903) and Cynthia (1903). In London, she was seen in The New Regime (1903), The School Girl (1903), and His Highness, My Husband (1904). "All the beauties of the day were in The School Girl," recalled actress Billie Burke. "I remember Clarita Vidal, famous and smick-smack, who posed as if she were made of wax, with just one expression of sheer beauty."

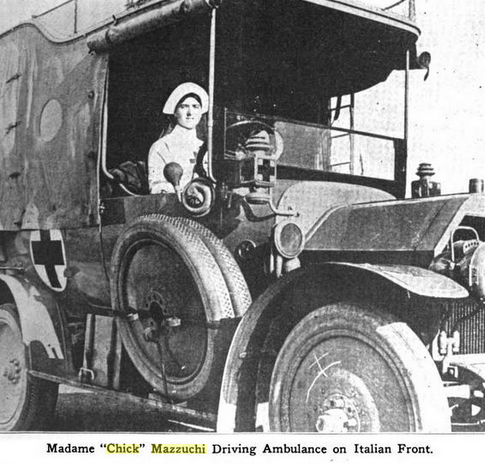
"Chick" Mazzuchi driving an ambulance, from a 1917 publication.

She married in 1909 and left the stage, but reappeared in the news by late 1915 as "Mme. Daisy Mazzuchi" or "Countess Chiquita 'Chick' Mazzuchi", working as a nurse at Latisana, or an ambulance driver, or both, during World War I. In 1917 she was a speaker at war relief fundraisers in New York, telling of wounds she received (including a bullet) in her work in Italy.

Her use of the title "Countess" was criticized by the Italian consul in Chicago, and her speeches were found to contain "grossly exaggerated" claims of her nursing experiences in the war zone. She agreed to stop speaking or collecting money for war relief when New York district attorney Edward Swann inquired about her work.

== Personal life ==
She married her first husband, an Englishman called Lord Seymour, when she was sixteen; he was killed on their honeymoon in South Africa. She married E. G. Mazzuchi in 1909. She had a daughter named Rita. She divorced her second husband before 1918.
