= Three Little Maids =

Edwardian musical comedy by Paul Rubens

Contemporary cartoon of Three Little Maids

Three Little Maids is an Edwardian musical comedy by Paul Rubens, with additional songs by Percy Greenbank and Howard Talbot. The story concerns three simple curate's daughters who go to London to earn their livings serving tea in a Bond Street tea shop. They become the romantic rivals of three ladies of fashion but succeed because of their freshness.

The musical opened at the Apollo Theatre in London on 10 May 1902 and later transferred to the Prince of Wales Theatre, running for a total of 348 performances. Edna May, Delia Mason and Lily Elsie (on tour) each starred as Edna Branscombe. Ada Reeve was a replacement as Ada Branscombe. Choreography was by Willie Warde, scenery by Hawes Craven and Joseph Harker, and costumes by C. Wilhelm.

There were also a Broadway production in 1903 and international tours. The New York Times gave the show a rave review after its opening night in New York: "It is just possible that there have been better musical comedies ... but if there have, nobody in the audience could think of them at the end of the evening.... It was the marvel of ... good looks, good dancing, and good acting working together for the common weal." The paper particularly praised the humour of G. P. Huntley and Maurice Farkoa. The title characters were played in New York by Maggie May, Madge Crichton, and Delia Mason. Another rave review was published in the New York Dramatic Mirror.

== Synopsis ==
Act I

The Branscombe girls are three simple curate's daughters from the countryside, not far from London. They meet Lady St. Mallory (proprietress of a fashionable tea shop) and her friends from London, including three young gentlemen to whom they immediately are attracted. The girls happily accept Lady St. Mallory's offer to go to London to work as waitresses serving tea in her Bond Street tea shop.

Act II

The three men, Lord Cheyne, Brian Molyneux and Monsieur de Lorme flirt with the girls at the tea shop, not recognizing them from the earlier out-of-town meeting, as the girls' serving uniform is the costume of Holland. Each of the men also has a London girlfriend of position in London society who becomes jealous of the Branscombe sisters. The society girls decide to disguise themselves as waitresses to meet their rivals on their own ground. The three men prefer the Branscombe girls and invite them to a dance at Lady St. Mallory's country house.

Act III

At the country house, the three girls charm the men and defeat their rivals, who are philosophical about their loss.

== Roles ==
De L'Orme and Hilda

- Edna, Hilda and Ada Branscombe (Daughters of the Rev. Theodore Branscombe) – Edna May, Hilda Moody, and Madge Crichton
- Lady St. Mallory – Lottie Venne
- Lady Rosemary Beaulieu, Venetia Grafton, and Lady Marjory Crichton (Protégées of Lady St. Mallory) – Millie Legarde, Betty Belknap and Ruby Ray
- Miss Deare (Postmistress at Market Mallory) – Sybil Grey
- Miss Crane (A Village Girl) – Hilda Jeffreys
- Miss Price (Manageress of the Tea Shop) – Jane May
- Hon. Bobbie Windsor (An Eton Boy) – Miss Vincent
- Miss Effie Thames – Effie Rivers
- Lord Cheyne (Nicknamed "Daisy") – G. P. Huntley
- Brian Molyneux – J. L. Mackay
- Rev. Theodore Branscombe (Vicar of Market Mallory) – John Beauchamp
- "Cupid" (A Caddy) – George Carroll
- M. De L'Orme (of the French Embassy) – Maurice Farkoa

== Musical numbers ==
ACT I - Golf Links at Market Mallory

- No. 1 - Chorus - "Since daybreak the sun very brightly has shone"
- No. 2 - Mrs. Deare & Chorus - "When I first saw Market Mallory, there wasn't much Market then"
- No. 3 - Edna, Hilda & Ada - "When the season's over, and you want a holiday 'mong the corn and clover"
- No. 4 - Country Girls & London Girls - "A mouse once lived in the country"
- No. 5 - Cupid - "I keep my eye on those maidens three, and strictly entre nous"
- No. 6 - de l'Orme & Chorus - "Of all the games that a man can play, Love is the hardest to beat"
- No. 7 - Edna & Brian - "In the future, come what may, I shall not forget today"
- No. 8 - Ada - "I'm sure you've never seen a gal like my gal Sal"
- No. 9 - Cheyne & Ada - "Golf is an excellent game in its way – But ev'rything's all 'in the way,'"
- No. 10 - Finale Act I - "All the luggage has been put upon the cart"

ACT II - A Bond Street Tea Shop

- No. 11 - Chorus - "When Society goes shopping in the regions of the West"
- No. 12 - Hilda & Chorus - "A miller's daughter liv'd beside a mill"
- No. 13 - de l'Orme - "When you are by my side, the world seems gay"
- No. 14 - Edna - "When I think of all the tales you've told me"
- No. 15 - Ada - "You men are a terrible bore, why were you ever invented?"
- No. 16 - Cupid & Chorus - "Tho' I'm only a boy it is true, women play havoc with me as with you"
- No. 17 - Cheyne - "You must have met a friend of mine called Algy"
- No. 18 - Edna, Hilda & Ada - "We are little tea girls, as you see"
- No. 19 - Ada, Edna, Hilda, Cheyne, Brian & de l'Orme - "You pull at a lever or press a knob"
- No. 20 - Finale Act II

ACT III - Lady St. Mallory's Drawing-room at Market Mallory

- No. 21 - Chorus - "Lady St. Mallory's friends this ev'ning are highly delighted"
- No. 22 - Edna - "When a maid loves a man, 'tis a sad to-do"
- No. 23 - Hilda & Chorus - "When a little lady first comes out, she'll find no end of men about"
- No. 24 - Ada & Chorus - "I don't believe I'm witty, I cannot think I'm smart"
- No. 25 - Hilda & de l'Orme - "Je vous adore, ev'ry day more, oh! how I long for the day when you're mine"
- No. 26 - Edna & Brian, Hilda & de l'Orme, Ada & Cheyne - "Oh, what a splendid thing, to have a wedding ring"
- No. 27 - Finale Act III (reprise of no. 26) - "Oh, what a splendid thing..."

Addendum

- No. 28 - Hilda, with Cheyne - "It won't be very long before I get to town"
