= Revival (theatre) =

Restaging of a stage production

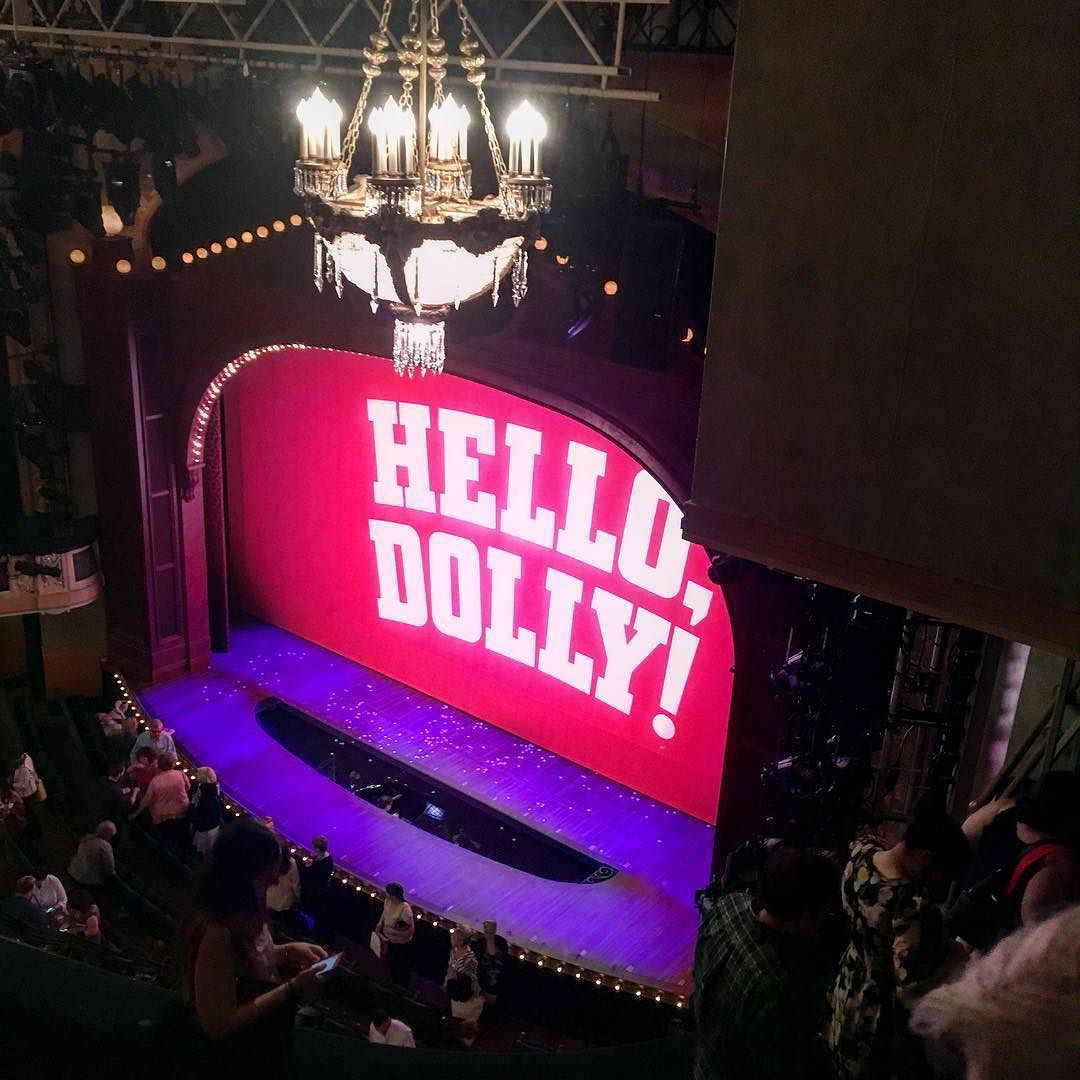
2017 revival of Hello, Dolly! in Shubert Theatre

A revival is a restaging of a stage production after its original run has closed. New material may be added. A filmed version is said to be an adaptation and requires writing of a screenplay. Revivals are common in Broadway theatre.
