= Edna May =

American actress and singer (1878–1948)

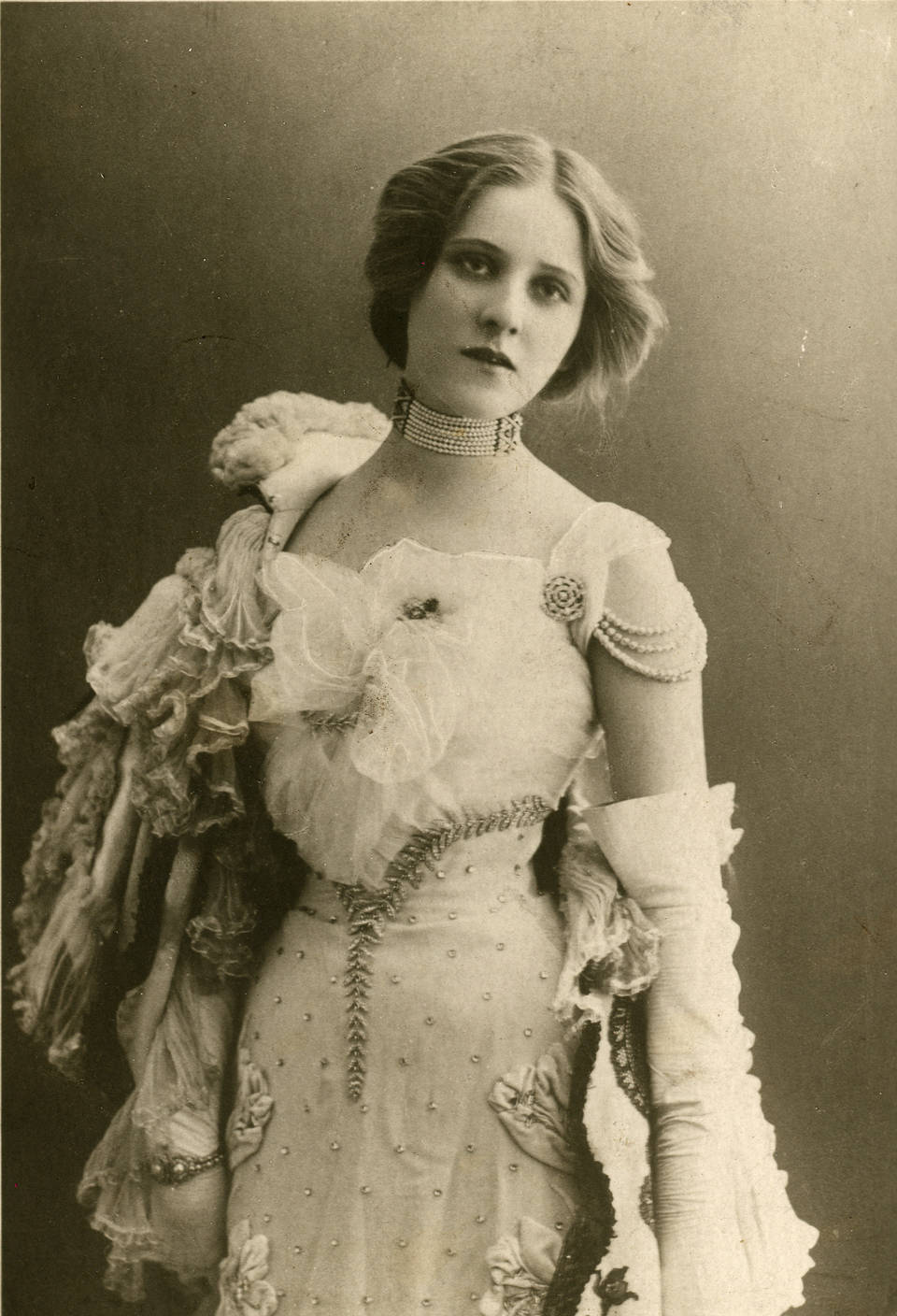
- May, c. 1907
- Born: Edna May Pettie; September 2, 1878; Syracuse, New York, U.S.
- Died: January 1, 1948 (aged 69); Lausanne, Switzerland
- Occupations: Actress, singer
- Years active: 1883–1907 Oscar Lewisohn (m. 1907; died 1917)

Edna May Pettie (September 2, 1878 – January 1, 1948), known on stage as Edna May, was an American actress and singer. A popular postcard beauty, May was famous for her leading roles in Edwardian musical comedies.

== Life and career ==
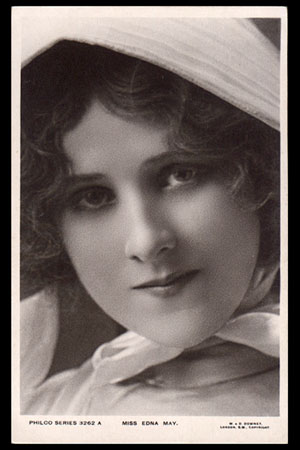
Edna May, c. 1900

Edna May was born in Syracuse, New York, to Edgar and Cora Petty. The family later changed the surname to "Pettie". Her father worked as a postman. Her siblings were Adelbert, Jennie and Marguerite.

At the age of 5, she played Little Willie Allen in a production of Dora. The next year, her performances "charmed a number of audiences lately with her child voice". By the age of 7, she had joined a children's opera company and performed Gilbert and Sullivan productions in Syracuse. She studied music at the New York Conservatoire as a teenager.

May made her professional debut in 1895 in Si Stebbings in Syracuse. She then moved to New York City to take the small role of Clairette Styrberg in Oscar Hammerstein's Broadway show, Santa Maria. That year, she married Fred Titus, who held a world record for cycling. They had no children and divorced in 1904.

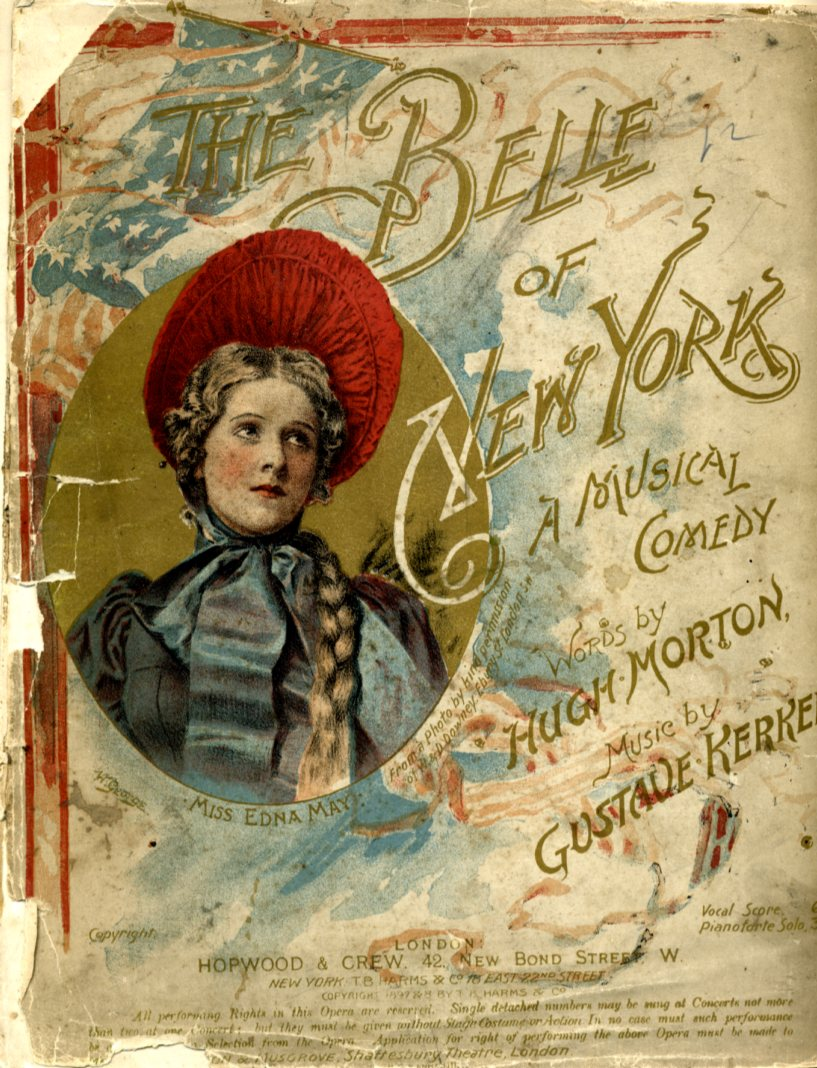
The cover of the vocal score of The Belle of New York

In 1897, May played Violet Grey in The Belle of New York with only moderate success. The following year, the production played in London, becoming a hit and running for 697 performances, making May a star. After that, among others, she played Gabrielle Dalmonte in An American Beauty in London (1900), Olga in The Girl from Up There (1901) in New York and then London, Edna Branscombe in Three Little Maids (1902), Lillian Leigh in The School Girl (1903–1904) in London and New York, Say-So-San in The Darling of the Guards (1904) in London, Alesia in La poupée (1904) in London, and Angela in The Catch of the Season (1905) in New York. The Belle of Mayfair followed in London in 1906. May played the title character in Nelly Neil in London in 1907.

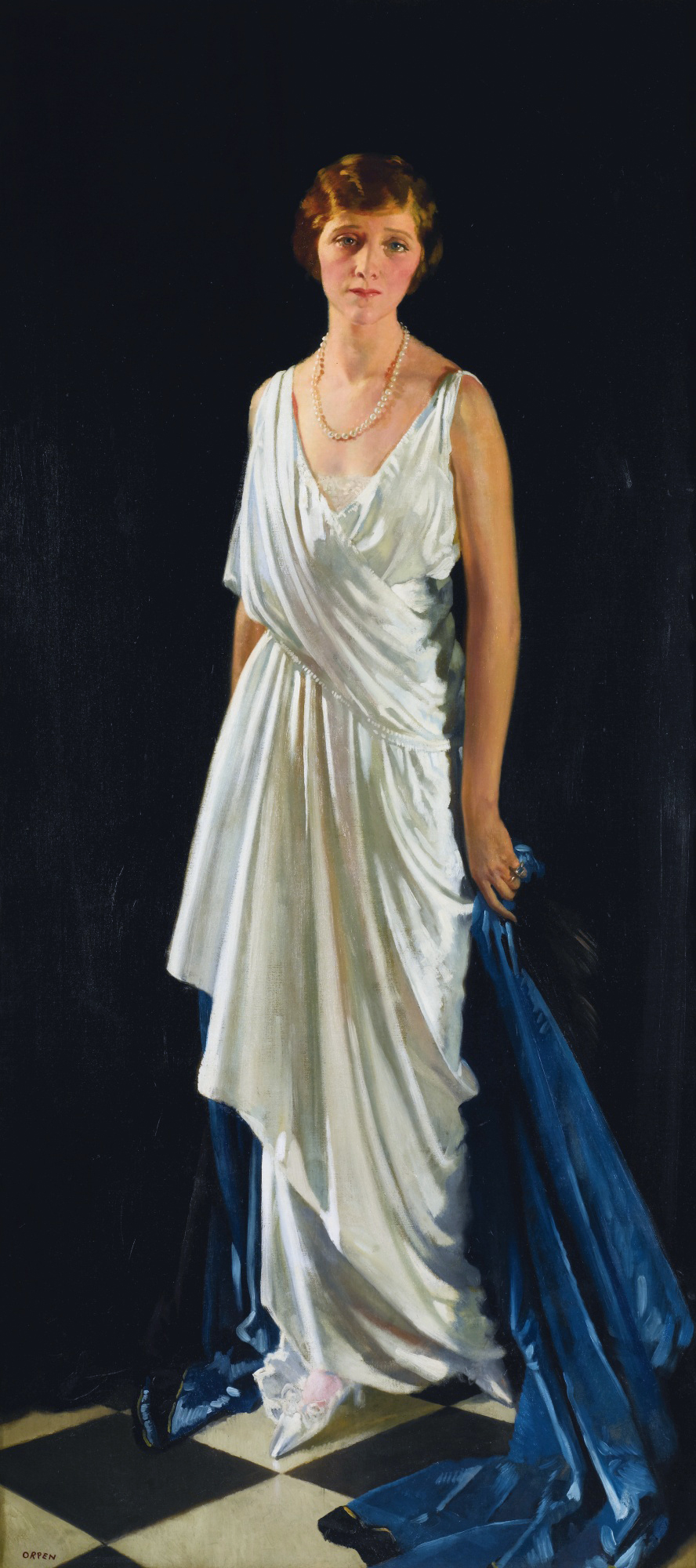
May in 1915, by William Orpen

May was known for her beauty and received tremendous attention from male admirers. In 1907, she married millionaire Oscar Lewisohn and retired from the stage. The couple settled in England. They had no children, and Lewisohn died in 1917.

May lived at Winkfield in Berkshire during her retirement, but made brief returns to the stage in 1911 benefit performances of The Belle of New York at the Savoy Theatre in London and 1915's The Masque of Peace and War in London. Also in 1911, she appeared in the film Forgotten; or An Answered Prayer. She starred in a 1916 film called Salvation Joan, donating the proceeds to charity.

She died in Lausanne, Switzerland, at the age of 69.
