= Lily Elsie =

English actress and singer (1886–1962)

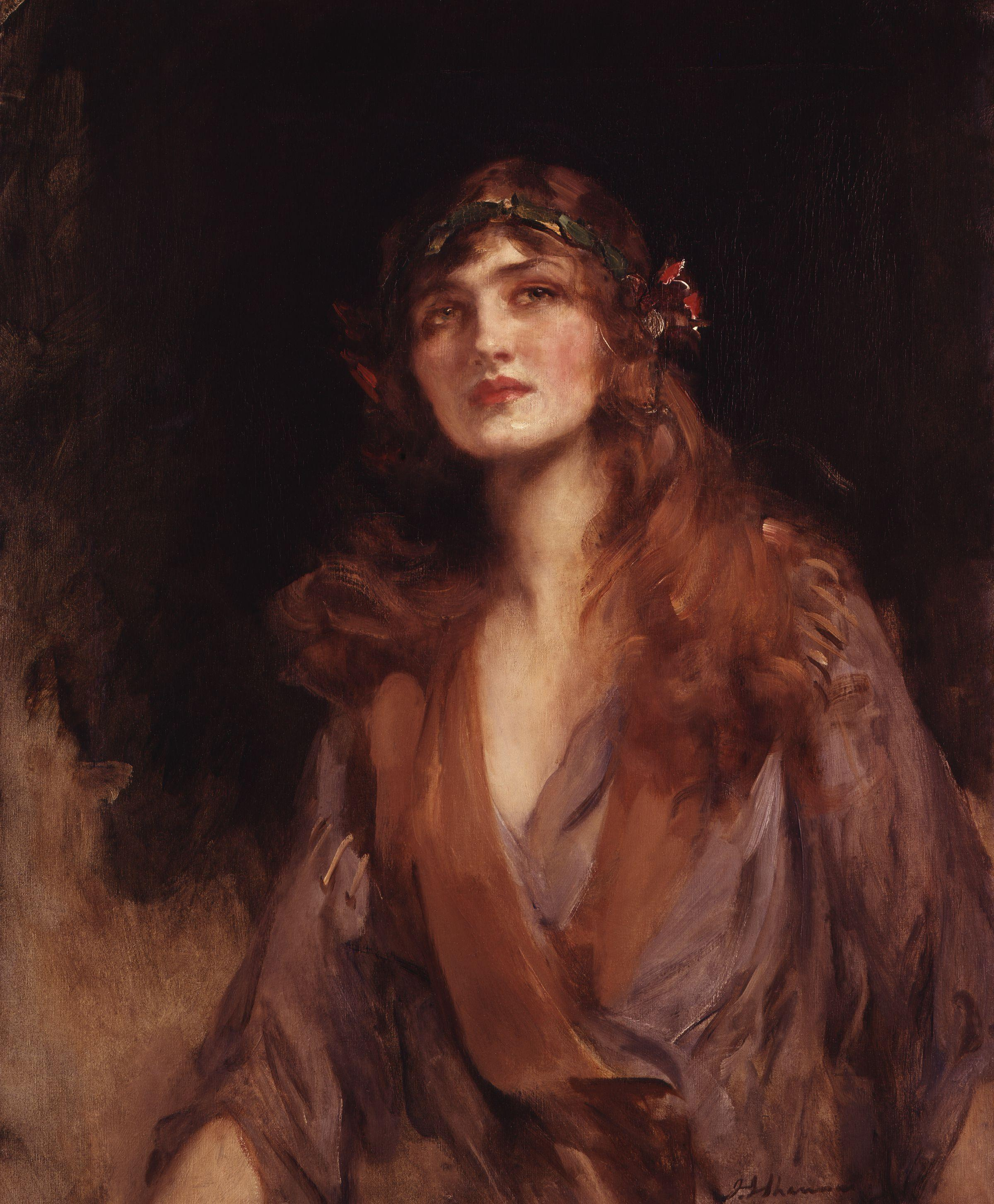
- Lily Elsie by James Jebusa Shannon, c. 1916
- Born: Elsie Hodder; 8 April 1886; Armley, West Yorkshire, England, UK
- Died: 16 December 1962 (aged 76); Cricklewood, London, England, UK
- Occupations: Actress, singer
- Years active: 1895–1929

Elsie Cotton (née Hodder, 8 April 1886 – 16 December 1962), known professionally as Lily Elsie, was an English actress and singer during the Edwardian era. She was best known for her starring role in the London premiere of Franz Lehár's operetta The Merry Widow.

Beginning as a child star in the 1890s, Elsie built her reputation in several successful Edwardian musical comedies before her great success in The Merry Widow, opening in 1907. Afterwards, she starred in several more successful operettas and musicals, including The Dollar Princess (1909), A Waltz Dream (1911) and The Count of Luxembourg (1911). Admired for her beauty and charm on stage, Elsie became one of the most photographed women of Edwardian times.

== Life and career ==
Elsie was born in Armley, West Yorkshire. Her mother, Charlotte Elizabeth Hodder (1864–1922), was a dressmaker who operated a lodging-house. She married William Thomas Cotton, a theatre worker, in 1891, and Elsie became Elsie Cotton. The family lived in Manchester. Elsie was also the niece of Wilfred Cotton, who married actress Ada Reeve.

=== Child star ===
A precocious child star, Elsie appeared in music hall and variety entertainments as a child impersonator known as Little Elsie. Nevertheless, she was reportedly painfully shy, even as an adult. By 1895–96, she appeared in concerts and pantomimes in theatres in Salford. In 1896, she played the role of Princess Mirza in The Arabian Nights at the Queen's Theatre in Manchester. Then, at Christmas 1896–97, at the age of ten, she appeared in the title role of Little Red Riding Hood at the same theatre for six weeks and then on tour for six additional weeks. Her first London appearance was at Christmas 1898 in King Klondike at Sara Lane's Britannia Theatre as Aerielle, the Spirit of the Air. Elsie then toured the provinces, travelling as far as Bristol and Hull for a full year in McKenna's Flirtation, a farce by American E. Selden, in 1900. She then played in Christmas pantomimes, including Dick Whittington (1901), The Forty Thieves (1902), and Blue Beard (1903) and toured in Edwardian musical comedies, including The Silver Slipper by Owen Hall, with music by Leslie Stuart (1901–02), and Three Little Maids (1903). From about 1900, she adopted the stage name Lily Elsie.

Elsie then joined George Edwardes' company at Daly's Theatre in London as a chorus girl. In 1903, she took over the role of Princess Soo-Soo in the hit musical A Chinese Honeymoon and then starred in the flop, Madame Sherry, by Hugo Felix, at the Apollo Theatre. She next played the roles of Gwenny Holden in Lady Madcap, Lady Patricia Vereker in The Cingalee in 1904, Madame du Tertre in The Little Michus in 1905, and Lady Agnes Congress in The Little Cherub (during which, she was fired by Edwardes for giggling, but soon rehired), Humming Bird in See See and Lally in The New Aladdin at the Gaiety Theatre, all in 1906. From 1900 to 1906, she appeared in 14 shows.

=== Merry Widow and peak years ===
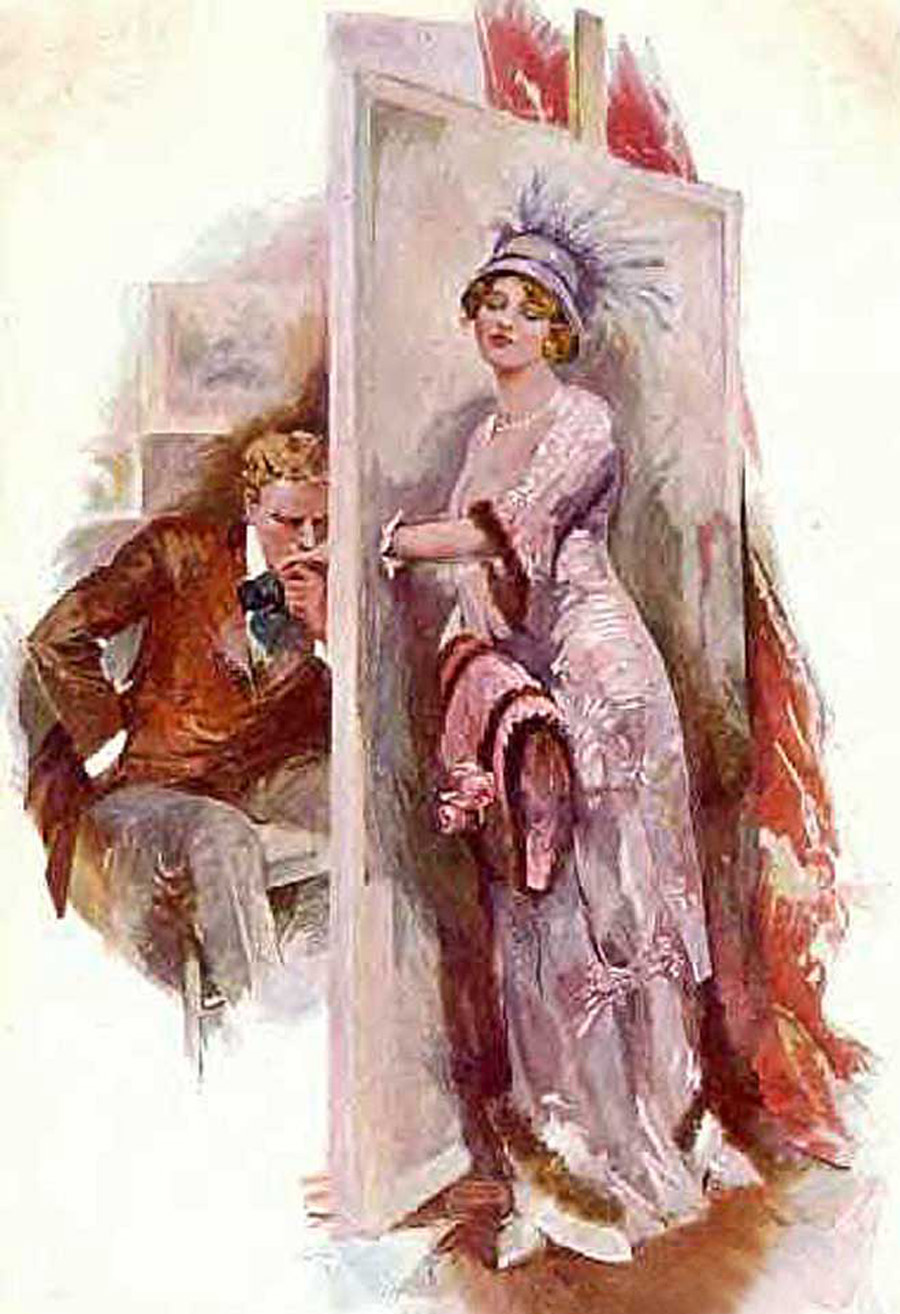
Elsie in The Count of Luxembourg

Elsie's biggest success came in creating the title role in the English-language version of The Merry Widow in the London production. Edwardes took Elsie to see the original German version (Die Lustige Witwe) in Berlin. Elsie was at first reluctant to take on the demanding part, thinking her voice too light for the role, but Edwardes persuaded her to accept. Edwardes brought her to see the famous designer, Lucile, for a style coaching. Lucile later wrote, "I realised that here was a girl who had both beauty and intelligence but who had never learnt how to make the best of herself. So shy and diffident was she in those days that a less astute producer than George Edwardes would in all probability have passed her over and left her in the chorus." The production, with English lyrics by Adrian Ross, opened in June 1907 and ran for 778 performances at Daly's Theatre. Elsie created the role at Daly's and toured with it beginning in August 1908. The show was an enormous success for its creators and made Elsie a major star. One critic at the opening night praised "the youthfulness, the dainty charm and grace, the prettiness and the exquisite dancing with which Miss Elsie invests the part.... I share the opinion of most of the first-nighters, who considered it could not have been in better hands, and could not have been better handled.... The night was a genuine triumph for Miss Elsie, and she well deserved all the calls she received."

Lucile designed the costumes for Elsie in The Merry Widow (including the plumed hats that became an extraordinary fad) and thereafter used Elsie to promote her fashions, designing her personal clothes and costumes for several of her other shows. Lucile wrote, "That season was a very brilliant one, perhaps the most brilliant of the series which brought the social life of pre-war London to its peak. And just when it was at its zenith a new play was launched with a new actress, who set the whole town raving over her beauty...." Elsie's image was in great demand by advertisers and on postcards, and she received unsolicited gifts of great value from many male admirers (and even bequests). Lucile commented, "She was absolutely indifferent to most [men] for she once told me she disliked the male character and considered that men only behaved tolerably to a woman who treated them coldly". Nevertheless, Elsie became one of the most frequently photographed beauties of the Edwardian era. According to the Atlanta Constitution newspaper in America, writing in 1915:

The Merry Widow, Act 3, London, 1907

"Perhaps her face is nearer to that of the Venus de Milo in profile than to any other famed beauty. There are no angles to be found about her any place.... If she came to America, she would undoubtedly be called the most beautiful woman in America. Nature never made a more brilliant success in the beauty business than she did with Lily Elsie. It was mostly from the nobility that her suitors came. Everyone agrees that Lily Elsie has the most kissable mouth in all England... she possesses the Cupid's bow outline with the ends curving upward delicately, all ready for smiles.... Strangely enough, the women of the land were among her most devoted admirers."

After The Merry Widow, Elsie appeared in another 16 shows, including in the very successful English-language versions of The Dollar Princess in 1909; as Franzi in the British premiere of A Waltz Dream in 1911; and as Angèle in The Count of Luxembourg, also in 1911, garnering continuous praise. One critic wrote that "it gave great pleasure merely to see her walk across the stage."

Elsie left the cast of The Count of Luxembourg to marry 6' 3" Major John Ian Bullough (1885–1936), the son of a wealthy textile manufacturer, but the marriage was reported to be mostly unhappy. In addition, Elsie often suffered from ill health, including anaemia, among other ailments, and had several operations during her years onstage. The gossip column in The Pelican called her "the occasional actress". Bullough wanted his wife to retire from the stage. The publicity shy and exhausted Elsie was happy to leave the stage for the next several years, except for charity performances to benefit the war effort. She returned in the title role of Louis Parker's comedy play Malvourneen with Herbert Beerbohm Tree at His Majesty's Theatre, as Lady Catherine Lazenby in The Admirable Crichton in 1916 and in the title role in Pamela written by Arthur Wimperis, with songs by Frederic Norton (1917; with Owen Nares). The Tatler wrote of her performance in Malvourneen, "Everyone should see Miss Lily Elsie in this play, for it shows us that her comedy is as good as her musical comedy, which is saying a great deal."

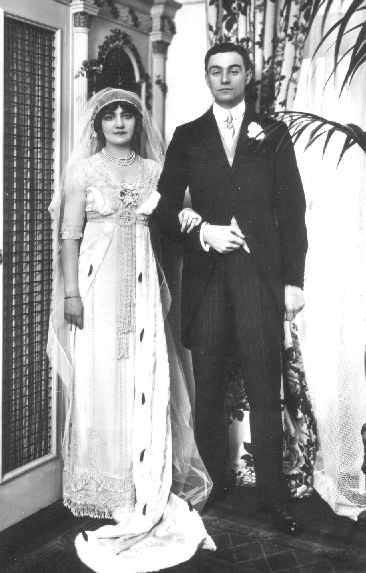
Wedding photo, 1911

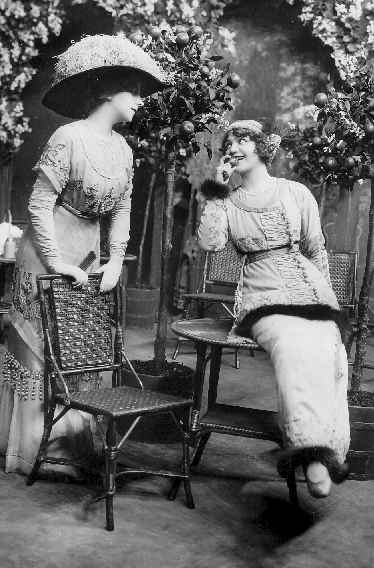
Amy Evans and Elsie in A Waltz Dream, 1911

=== Later years ===
In 1920, Elsie moved with her husband to the Gloucestershire village of Redmarley D'Abitot. She spent ten years away from the stage during this time, enjoying social events and fox hunting. She returned to performing, first touring and then appearing at the Prince of Wales's Theatre in London in 1927 as Eileen Mayne in The Blue Train, the English language adaptation of Robert Stolz's German musical comedy Mädi. Her last show before retiring was Ivor Novello's successful The Truth Game back at Daly's Theatre in 1928–1929.

Finally, in 1930, Elsie's unhappy marriage ended in divorce as her health deteriorated further and she became subject to fits of ill temper. She spent much time in nursing homes and Swiss sanatoria. She was diagnosed as having serious psychological ailments and underwent brain surgery that reportedly resulted in an improvement in her health. Her last years were spent at St. Andrew's Hospital in London.

Elsie died at St. Andrew's Hospital (demolished in 1973), Cricklewood, London, aged 76, and was cremated at Golders Green Crematorium.

== Recordings and films ==
From Pamela, Duets with Owen Nares. Music by Frederick Norton. Lyrics by Arthur Wimperis. Recorded on 22 January 1918:

- "I'm so very Glad I met You". His Master's Voice 04224 (Matrix No. HO-3046 af)
- "It's not the things you've got". His Master's Voice 04225 (Matrix No. HO-3051 af)
- "I Loved you so". His Master's Voice 03602 (Matrix No. HO 3048 af)
- "Waltz theme and Cupid" (Finales, Act 2). His Master's Voice 04223 (Matrix No. HO 3053 af)
- "Cupid, Cupid". His Master's Voice 03601 (Matrix No. HO 3054 af)

From The Blue Train. Music by Robert Stolz, Ivy St. Helier and Gorney, lyrics by Dion Titheradge and Reginald Arkell. Recorded in 1927:

- "The Blue Train". (Titheradge and Gorney) Columbia 4438 (Matrix No. 5661)
- "When a Girl is in Love with a Man". (Titheradge, Arkell, and Stolz) Duet with Arthur Margetson. Columbia 9223 (Matrix No. AX 2866)
- "Eileen". (Arkell and Stolz) Duet with Arthur Margetson. Columbia 4439 (Matrix No. A 5660)
- "Swiss Fairyland". (Arkell and Stolz) Columbia 4438 (Matrix No. A 5662)
- "You Didn't Ask Me First". (Arkell and St.Helier) Duet with Arthur Margetson. Columbia 9223 (Matrix No. AX 2867)

Elsie appeared in two films: the D. W. Griffith film The Great Love (1918, a cameo role), and Comradeship (1919).

== Gallery ==
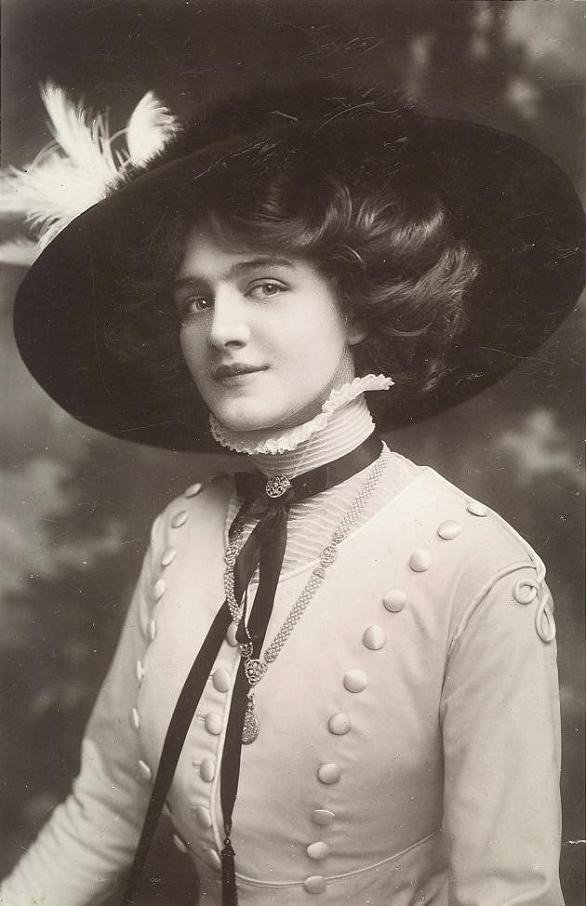
Lily Elsie – Postcard, postmarked Birmingham September 1909

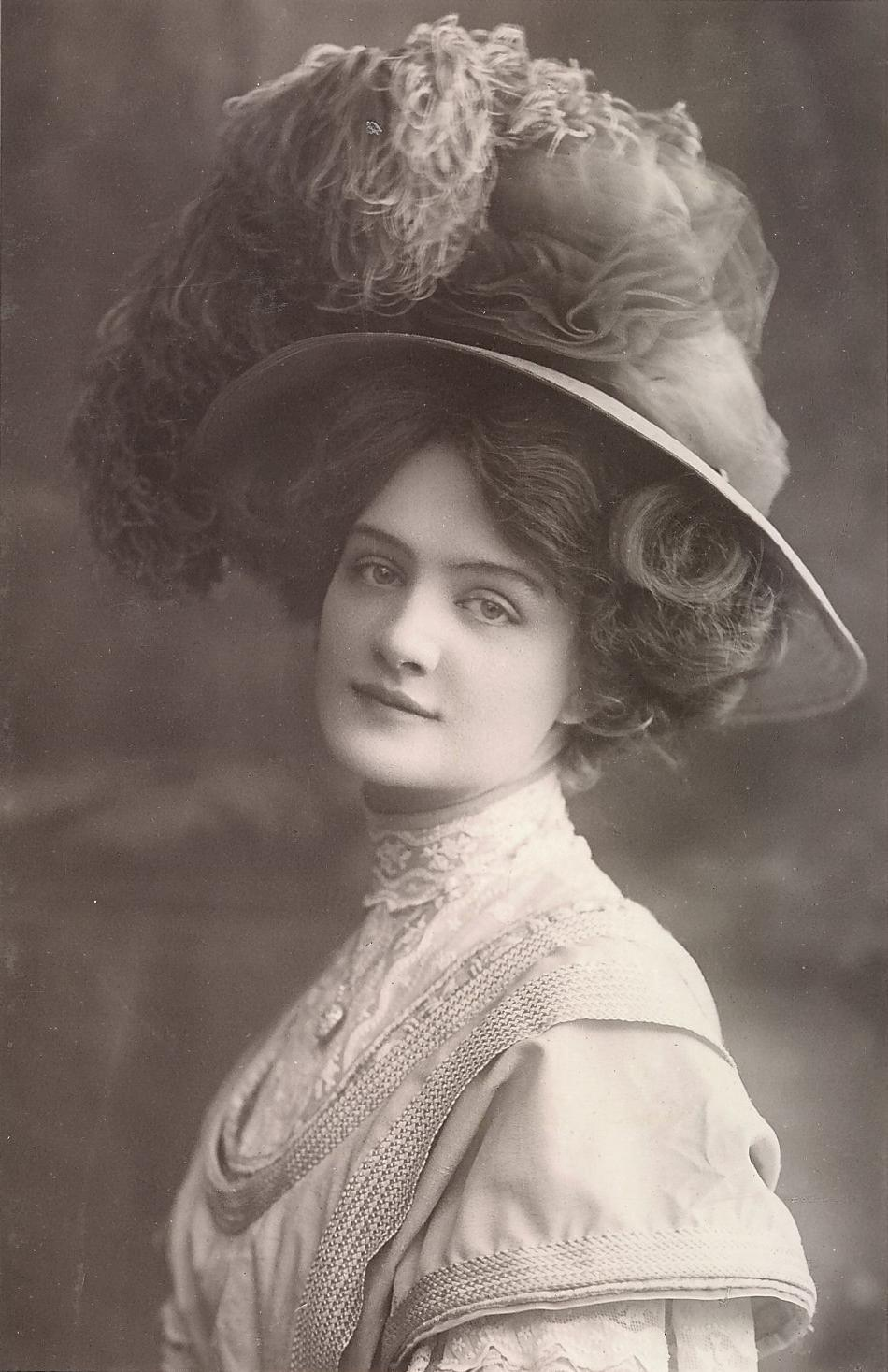
Elsie as Sonia in The Merry Widow, London – Postcard, postmarked October 1907

Elsie in The Merry Widow

Elsie in A Chinese Honeymoon
