= The Belle of Mayfair =

- Edna May in the title role
- Music: Leslie Stuart
- Book: Basil Hood; Charles Brookfield; Cosmo Hamilton
- Basis: Shakespeare's Romeo and Juliet
- Productions: 1906 West End

May and Soutar in the balcony scene

The Belle of Mayfair is a musical comedy composed by Leslie Stuart with a book by Basil Hood, Charles Brookfield and Cosmo Hamilton and lyrics by George Arthurs, Hood and William Caine. The story is inspired by the Shakespeare play Romeo and Juliet.

The original production opened at the Vaudeville Theatre in London on 11 April 1906, produced by Charles Frohman. It ran for 431 performances, closing on 13 April 1907, and starred Edna May, Louie Pounds, Arthur Williams, Camille Clifford and Courtice Pounds. Hood withdrew his name from the original production after Frohman started altering the text to suit casting changes that occurred during the run. Some of these changes resulted from disputes between the female leads and the management, one of which resulted in court action. Edna May stormed out of the production, and the role was assumed by Phyllis Dare, making her a star.

== Roles and original cast list ==
- Julia Chaldicott (The Belle of Mayfair) – Edna May
- Hon. Raymond Finchley (Julia's lover) – Farren Soutar
- Princess Carl of Ehrenbreitstein – Louie Pounds
- Sir John Chaldicott (Julia's father) – Arthur Williams
- Lady Chaldicott (Julia's mother) – Maud Boyd
- Hugh Meredith (a bachelor) – Courtice Pounds
- Perrier (Julia's 'official' suitor) – Charles Angelo
- Lord Mount Highgate (Raymond's father) – Sam Walsh
- Countess of Mount Highgate (Raymond's Mother) – Irene Desmond
- Duchess of Dunmow – Camille Clifford
- Captain Theobald – Mervyn Dene
- Lady Violet – Jane May
- Lady Rosaline – Ruby Ray

== Synopsis ==
Act I

A young couple, Julia Chaldicott and Raymond Mount-Highgate, fall madly in love during a sham auction taking place at a bazaar held in a London private park. This causes alarm to Julia's father, Sir John Chaldicott, Baronet, who hates Raymond's family. Among the distinguished visitors present at the auction are the Duchess of Dunmow, and Princess Carl of Ehrenbreitstein, a charming English girl, married to a German Prince. Raymond's friends advise him not to worry about marriage and to enjoy himself instead, while Julia's high powered friends, including Princess Carl, try to get him sent overseas as a diplomat. Julia's father tries to end the match by announcing that his daughter is going to become engaged to the Comte de Perrier, a conductor of a foreign band that is touring in the vicinity, and he is paid to become Julia's official suitor. As a result, Raymond threatens to punch the Comte and elope with Julia.

Act II

Sir John and his lady are at the opera, and Julia is being presented at Court by the Princess. A member of the orchestra brings a bag containing the band leader's costume to Sir John's house. Shortly afterwards, Sir John and Lady Chaldicott return. Some guests have been invited to meet Julia after her presentation. Soon Julia enters radiant and beautiful in her Court dress, and before long Raymond arrives to plan the elopement. Raymond shall ask Doctor Marmaduke Lawrence, the Bishop of Brighton, to officiate at the wedding. They are interrupted in their scheming, and Raymond, on Julia's inspiration, dons the costume of the missing bandmaster and confers with her father as to the programme of music. Sir John disturbed by the bandmaster's apparent change of manner.

Just when everything is arranged, Princess Carl appeals to Julia not to run away with Raymond, as the shock might injure her father's health, and Julia, like a dutiful daughter, consents to wait. Sir John demands that his daughter give up Raymond entirely and unconditionally. Julia makes a tender and impassioned appeal that her heart may not be broken, and in the end Sir John gives way. Lord Mount-Highgate and his wife, who arrive to assist in frustrating the elopement, hear Julia declare her love for Raymond, and her father give his consent to the marriage. A general reconciliation takes place, and everything ends happily.

== Musical numbers ==
Act I

- Bells in the Morning – The Belle of Mayfair
- Eight Little Debutantes Are We – Debutantes
- I'm a Duchess – Duchess of Dunmow
- In Gay Mayfair – Julia
- Welcome to Princess – Chorus
- Said I to Myself – H.S.H. Princess Carl of Ehbreneitstein
- Where You Go Will I Go – Julia
- Come to St. George's – Julia, H.S.H. Princess Carl, Honorable Raymond Finchley and Hugh Meredith
- Finale – Chorus

Act II

- My Lady Fair – Stall-holder and Chorus
- My Little Girl is a Shy Little Girl – The Belle of Mayfair and Comte de Perrier
- Hello, Come Along Girls – Hugh Meredith, Debutantes and Little Buds
- We've Come from Court – Julia, H.S.H. Princess Carl, Lady Chaldicott, Comte de Perrier, Sir George Cheatham, K.C. and Guests
- And the Weeping Willow Wept – H.S.H. Princess Carl
- The Little Girl at the Sweet Shop – Julia
- What Makes the Woman? – Honorable Raymond Finchley
- Why Do They Call Me a Gibson Girl – Duchess of Dunmow, The Earl of Mount Highgate and Debutantes
- I Know a Girl – Hon. Raymond Finchley, Hugh Meredith, Comte de Perrier, The Earl of Mount Highgate and Sir John Chaldicott, Bart, M.P.
- Come to St. George's (Finale) – Chorus
