= Paul Rubens =

English songwriter and librettist (1875–1917)

Rubens in 1906

Paul Alfred Rubens (29 April 1875 – 5 February 1917) was an English songwriter and librettist who wrote some of the most popular Edwardian musical comedies of the early twentieth century. He contributed to the success of dozens of musicals.

Born in Kensington, London, he attended Winchester College before studying law at University College, Oxford. He began writing songs for shows at the age of 10 and had his first major success with "The Little Chinchilla" for the hit musical The Shop Girl when he was 19 years old. This was soon followed by songs for, among others, the hit musical San Toy. In 1899, he wrote songs for the international hit Florodora, which brought him wider fame. Producer George Edwardes hired him as an "additional material" writer for, among others, The Messenger Boy (1900), The Toreador (1901), A Country Girl (1902), The Girl from Kays (1902), The School Girl (1903), The Cingalee (1904) and The Blue Moon (1905), writing some of the most successful songs in these shows. He composed the hit musical Miss Hook of Holland (1907).

Later compositions include The Balkan Princess (1910), The Sunshine Girl (1912), The Girl from Utah (1913), Tonight's the Night (1914), Betty (1915) and The Happy Day (1916). Rubens began a relationship with the actress Phyllis Dare during this period, but they soon parted due to Rubens' severe consumptive illness, from which he suffered for the rest of his life. As a result, he retired to Cornwall and died of tuberculosis, aged 41.

== Life and career ==
Rubens was born in Kensington, London, the eldest son of a successful German-born Jewish stockbroker, Victor Rubens, and Jenny Rubens, née Wallach. Rubens attended Winchester College and then studied law at University College, Oxford, from 1895 to 1897. Rubens had begun writing songs for shows as early as age 10, and he continued in music and dramatic societies throughout school. He intended, at first, to practise law, but he soon gave it up to write songs for the stage, including for a production of Alice in Wonderland, while still at Oxford, in which Lewis Carroll collaborated.

=== Early career ===
Contemporary cartoon of Three Little Maids

Rubens supplied lyrics and melodies for a number of successful musicals in the 1890s, beginning with "The Little Chinchilla" in the hit musical The Shop Girl (1894), sung by Ellaline Terriss at the Gaiety Theatre, London. Rubens was a talented melodist, but as he lacked musical training others had to supply the accompaniment for his songs. In the years that followed, he wrote songs for Arthur Roberts for Dandy Dan the Lifeguardsman (1898, "There's Just a Something Missing"); for Milord Sir Smith; for Little Miss Nobody ("Trixie of Upper Tooting", "A Wee Little Bit of a Thing Like That", "We'll Just Sit Out", and "The People All Come to See Us"); and for the hit musical San Toy (1899, "Me Gettee Outee Velly Quick") for producer George Edwardes. During the same year, he wrote the play Young Mr Yarde (1898, with Harold Ellis) and co-wrote a burlesque, Great Caesar (1899, with George Grossmith, Jr.), which was produced on the West End, but both were failures.

In 1899, he wrote songs for L'amour mouillé and the international hit, Florodora (1899: "Inkling", "Tact", "When I Leave Town", "I Want to Marry a Man", "When an Interfering Person", "Queen of the Philippine Islands", and "When We're on the Stage"), which brought him wider fame. Edwardes quickly hired Rubens as an "additional material" writer, and Rubens supplied some of the most successful numbers in The Messenger Boy in 1900 ("Tell Me Pretty Maiden", "How I Saw the CIV", and "A Perfectly Peaceful Person"); The Toreador in 1901 ("Everybody's Awfully Good to Me"); A Country Girl in 1902 ("Two Little Chicks" and "Coo"); The Girl from Kays in 1902 ("I Don't Care"); The School Girl in 1903; The Cingalee in 1904 ("Sloe Eyes", "Make a Fuss of Me", "She's All Right", '"You and I and I and You", "Golly-wogs", and "Somethings Devilish Wrong"); The Blue Moon in 1905; and The Dairymaids (1906), with a book by Alexander M. Thompson and Robert Courtneidge.

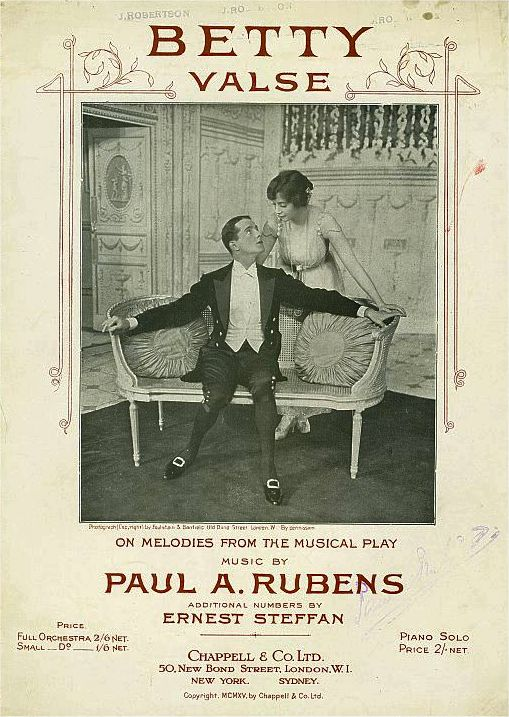
Sheet music from Betty

During this period, Rubens also wrote incidental music for the 1901 production of Twelfth Night at His Majesty's Theatre. He also wrote songs for The Medal and the Maid (1902, 'Consequences') and The School Girl (1903). Edwardes gave Rubens the opportunity to write the book, lyrics and some of the music for Three Little Maids (1902), which had London and international success; Lady Madcap (1904, for which he wrote all of the music), which also had a long run; and Mr. Popple of Ippleton (1905), a more sophisticated piece than many of Rubens' earlier musical comedies, which was later produced in America as Nobody Home, with songs by Jerome Kern.

=== Later years ===
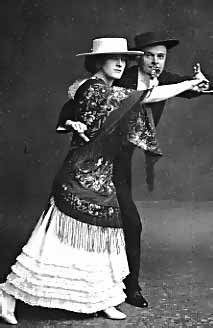
Grossmith and Dare in The Sunshine Girl, 1912

Frank Curzon then hired Rubens to write both the words and songs for musicals starring his wife, Isabel Jay (who had already starred in two of Rubens' shows), at the Prince of Wales Theatre, with exotic sets, elaborate costumes and a host of beautiful chorus girls. The first was Miss Hook of Holland in 1907, which turned out to be Rubens' most enduring success. Because of the progression of the consumptive illness from which he suffered most of his life, he needed the assistance of the director, Austen Hurgon, to finish the libretto. Rubens and Hurgon next wrote the disappointing My Mimosa Maid (1908) and the somewhat more successful Dear Little Denmark (1909).

After writing songs that made their way into several Broadway shows, Rubens supplied songs for a number of mostly successful later shows, beginning with Curzon's The Balkan Princess in 1910 (an international hit, also starring Jay). He then returned to Edwardes' theatres, where the departure of Ivan Caryll gave him the chance to write the songs for The Sunshine Girl in 1912, The Girl from Utah in 1913, After the Girl in 1914, Tina and Betty, both in 1915, and The Happy Day in 1916. He also contributed music to the 1912 Broadway production of Little Boy Blue. His best and most popular work from these years, however, is heard in his melodies and lyrics for Tonight's the Night (1914). After the outbreak of the First World War, Rubens wrote a successful recruiting song called "Your King and Country Want You". Vesta Tilley often performed the song. Rubens' songs continued to be used at least into the 1920s. "The Gondola and the Girl" was part of the score of Irene Bordoni's 1924 production, Little Miss Bluebeard.

Rubens met actress Phyllis Dare when she was cast in The Sunshine Girl, and he wrote a number of songs for her. They began a relationship and ultimately became engaged, but Rubens who had suffered severe ill-health through virtually his whole career, became too sick to marry, and so the couple separated.

He retired to Cornwall and died in Falmouth, of tuberculosis, at the age of 41.
