= The School Girl =

Edwardian musical comedy composed by Leslie Stuart

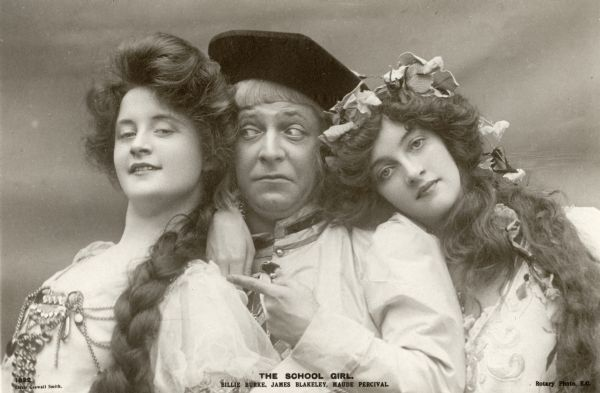
Billie Burke, James Blakeley, and Maude Percival in a 1903 publicity photograph for The School Girl.

The School Girl is an Edwardian musical comedy, in two acts, composed by Leslie Stuart (with additional songs by Paul Rubens) with a book by Henry Hamilton and Paul M. Potter, and lyrics by Charles H. Taylor and others. It concerns a French school girl from a convent, who goes to Paris to help her lovesick friend. Through mistaken identity, she learns secrets that help her at the Paris stock exchange and ends up at a students' ball in the Latin Quarter. All ends happily.

The musical was first produced in 1903 by George Edwardes and Charles Frohman at the Prince of Wales Theatre in London and ran for 333 performances there. It starred Edna May, Marie Studholme and Billie Burke. George Grossmith, Jr. succeeded G. P. Huntley as Ormsby St. Ledger. The show also played successfully on Broadway in 1904, with May and Grossmith, and on the national and international touring circuits.

The most famous song from this show was "My Little Canoe".

== Roles and original cast ==
- Lillian Leigh – Edna May
- Mother Superior – Violet Cameron
- Marianne (a French Bonne) – Marianne Caldwell
- Norma Rochester, Mamie Reckfeller, Yolande, Violette, Mimi, Fifine (American Girls) – Norma Whalley, Billie Burke, Pauline Chase, Maude Percival, Ethel Negretti, Mamie Stuart
- Saaefrada (a Model) – Clarita Vidal
- Kate Medhurst – Mildred Baker
- Jessie Campbell, Evelyn Somers, Mabel Kingston (School Girls) – Mary Fraser, Evelyn Bond, Alice Coleman
- Miss Yost (the Typewriter) – Lulu Valli
- Mrs. Marchmont – Barbara Huntley
- Cicely Marchmont (her Daughter) – Marie Studholme
- Sir Ormesby St. Leger – G. P. Huntley (replaced by George Grossmith, Jr.)
- General Marchmont – George Graves
- Peter Overend (of the Open Stock Exchange) – J. A. Warden
- Corner (his Clerk) – Gilbert Porteus
- Jacques De Crevert (Clerk) – Frank Walsh
- Tubby Bedford – James Blakeley
- George Sylvester, Adolphe Delapois, Jack Merrion, Edgar Verney (Artists) – Charles Hampden, Murri Moncrieff, Talleur Andrews, J. Edward Fraser

== Musical numbers ==
Act I: Scene 1 – The Convent Lawn

- No. 1. Chorus – "Gaily rings the bell for recreation, occupation we willingly pursue..."
- No. 2. Cicely and Chorus – "I'm going to be a Honeymoon Girl, and leave my spinster days behind..."
- No. 3. Mother Superior and Chorus – "When I was a girl like you, little girls, little girls..."
- No. 4. Lilian – "We've formed a small battalion on a military plan, for none defeats a man as lovely woman can..."

Act I: Scene 2 – The Open Stock Exchange

- No. 5. Chorus – "We're going to be busy today, for the market is changing and chopping today..."
- No. 6. Entrance of American Girls – "We say to you, good day to you, flotationers - Chickoo! chickoo! chickoo! ..."
- No. 7. Sir Ormesby – "There's a girl they call Belinda whom I met one day..."
- No. 8. Tubby – "She had read Marie Corelli, and emphatically swore that she'd never wed a man..."
- No. 9. (Singer unknown) – "The world has maidens sweet and pretty where'er we go; the gay grisettes of Paris city..."
- No. 10. Lilian – "If you'd like to know what waiting is, then you may coquette with me..."
- No. 11. Finale Act I – "We're going to be at least a nine days wonder, the rise is in 'Jumping Jacks' today..."

Act II: Edgar Verney's Studio

- No. 12. Chorus – "Étudiant des Beaux Arts, what though posterity may give unto your honour'd name..."
- No. 13. Mamie Reckfeller – "Mamie, if you've nothing else to do, ma Mamie girl, I'm goin' to give an invitation..."
- No. 14. Lilian – "Clytie is so unsophisticated; she has a modest smile, a drooping eye..."
- No. 15. Lilian and Verney – "Can't you see that I'm in love, and only wait till I can prove that I've been true? ..."
- No. 16. "There's nothing like a wife, they say, for driving worries and cares away..."
- No. 16a. Tarantella, Valse and Cake Walk
- No. 17. Tubby – "I've been in love since seventeen, of course that's nothing new..."
- No. 18. Lilian – "Our good Monsieur le Maire at a town that I come from in France was choosing out La Rosière..."

== Score and libretto ==
- Stuart, Leslie (1903). The School Girl: A Musical Play. London: Francis, Day & Hunter.
- Hamilton, Henry (1903). The School Girl: A Musical Play. United States: Kessinger Publishing. ISBN 978-1-104-32744-6.
