= 1910 in British music =

This is a summary of 1910 in music in the United Kingdom.

== Events ==
- 22 February – Frederick Delius's latest opera, A Village Romeo and Juliet is premièred at the Royal Opera House, Covent Garden, with Thomas Beecham conducting.
- 6 April – A Somerset Rhapsody by Gustav Holst is performed for the first time at Queen's Hall, London by the New Symphony Orchestra, conducted by Edward Mason.
- 30 August – In the Faëry Hills, an early tone poem by Arnold Bax, is performed for the first time at the Henry Wood Proms at Queen’s Hall.
- 6 September – Ralph Vaughan Williams conducts the first performance of his Fantasia on a Theme by Thomas Tallis in Gloucester Cathedral.
- 20 September – The Veil, an oratorio by Sir Frederic Hymen Cowen, is performed for the first time at the Cardiff Festival.
- 12 October – The first performance of Sea Symphony (Symphony No. 1) by Vaughan Williams takes place at the Leeds Festival, conducted by the composer.
- 10 November – Fritz Kreisler is the soloist and Edward Elgar the conductor at the première of his Violin Concerto in B Minor, in London.

== Popular music ==
- "I'm Henery the Eighth, I Am"; by Fred Murray and R. P. Weston, performed by Harry Champion
- "Macushla"; music by Dermot MacMurrough and lyrics by Josephine V. Rowe
- "When Father Papered the Parlour"; by R. P. Weston and Fred J. Barnes, performed by Billy Williams

== Classical music: new works ==
- Samuel Coleridge-Taylor – Endymion's Dream (cantata)
- Rutland Boughton – Five Celtic Songs
- George Dyson - Choral Symphony
- Katharine Emily Eggar - Idyll for flute and piano
- Ralph Vaughan Williams
  - Fantasia on a Theme of Thomas Tallis
  - Symphony No. 1 ("A Sea Symphony")

== Opera ==
- Two Merry Monarchs, book by Arthur Anderson and George Levy, lyrics by Anderson and Hartley Carrick, and music by Orlando Morgan
- A Summer Night, one act comic opera by George Clutsam, is produced in London on 23 July.

== Musical theatre ==
- 19 February – The Balkan Princess, by Frederick Lonsdale and Frank Curzon, with lyrics by Paul Rubens and Arthur Wimperis, and music by Paul Rubens, opens at the Prince of Wales Theatre, starring Isabel Jay and Bertram Wallis; it runs for 176 performances.

== Births ==
- 10 February – Joyce Grenfell, actress, comedian and singer-songwriter (died 1979)
- 15 February – Stanley Vann, composer, conductor and choirmaster (died 2010)
- 10 June – Robert Still, composer of tonal music (died 1971)
- 15 June – Alf Pearson, singer and variety performer with his brother as half of Bob and Alf Pearson (died 2012)
- 17 June – Sam Costa, crooner, radio actor and disc jockey (died 1981)
- 22 June – Peter Pears, tenor (died 1986)
- 15 July – Ronald Binge, composer of light music (died 1973)
- 1 September – Peggy van Praagh, dancer, teacher and ballet director (died 1990)
- 16 October – William Reed, composer (died 2002)
- 1 December – Alicia Markova, ballerina (died 2004)
- date unknown – Val Rosing, dance band singer, later an opera singer under the name Gilbert Russell (died 1969)

== Deaths ==
- 3 May – Lottie Collins, singer and dancer, 44 (heart disease)
- 10 May – Anna Laetitia Waring, poet and hymn-writer, 87

== See also ==
- 1910 in the United Kingdom
