= Frederick Lonsdale =

British playwright (1881–1954)

- Lonsdale in 1908
- Born: 5 February 1881; St Helier, Jersey
- Died: 4 April 1954 (aged 73); London, England
- Occupation: playwright
- Children: Frances Donaldson

Frederick Lonsdale (5 February 1881 – 4 April 1954) was a British playwright known for his librettos to several successful musicals early in the 20th century, including King of Cadonia (1908), The Balkan Princess (1910), Betty (1915), The Maid of the Mountains (1917), Monsieur Beaucaire (1919) and Madame Pompadour (1923). He also wrote comedy plays, including Aren't We All? (1923), The Last of Mrs Cheyney (1925) and On Approval (1927) and the murder melodrama But for the Grace of God (1946). Some of his plays and musicals were made into films, and he also wrote a few screenplays.

Born and raised in Jersey, Lonsdale began writing comic sketches while serving in the army. His first play, Who's Hamilton?, was produced in 1903. In 1904 he eloped with Leslie Brooke Hoggan, through whom he was introduced to Frank Curzon. Curzon began to produce Lonsdale's musicals and comic plays in 1908 in the West End with The King of Cadonia. The Maid of the Mountains, opening in 1917, ran for 1,352 performances, becoming the second-longest-running musical in West End history. Through the 1920s, many of Lonsdale's musicals and plays enjoyed success. After this, his familiar genres, Edwardian musical comedy and drawing-room comedy, lost popularity. He continued to write plays and some screenplays for another two decades, moving to the United States in 1938.

== Life and career ==
=== Early years ===
Lonsdale was born Lionel Frederick Leonard in St Helier, Jersey, the third and youngest son of Susan (née Belford) and John Henry Leonard, a tobacconist. He was educated on Jersey, left school at seventeen and joined the South Lancashire Regiment as a private. He had been a troublesome and wayward child and youth, and one biographer – his daughter Frances Donaldson – surmises that his parents may have felt that army discipline might be beneficial. He did not adapt well to army life, and persuaded a sympathetic doctor to provide him with a medical discharge on the grounds of a heart condition (of which no more was heard for the rest of his life).

On returning to Jersey, Lonsdale (still at that time using his birth surname, Leonard) took a job as a clerk in the London and South Western Railway office in St Helier. In 1901 he formed an attachment with a Canadian girl who was enrolled at an academy in St Helier. Her father, disapproving, took her back to Canada but Lonsdale pursued her, working his way across the Atlantic as a steward on a liner. Once in Canada, his attempt to be reunited with the young woman was thwarted by the shotgun-wielding father and he returned to England, where he worked for a time performing odd jobs on the Southampton docks.

He had written comic sketches to entertain his colleagues while in the army, and in May 1903 his farcical comedy Who's Hamilton? was presented at the New Theatre, Ealing. It was billed as being by "Keith Lonsdale" although the press mentioned that the author's real name was L. F. Leonard. A touring company brought the piece to Jersey, where it was announced that owing to the illness of the leading man, the author would play the part. According to his biographer Katherine Mullin it played "to a packed and appreciative house", and it was the only play in which Lonsdale ever acted.

In 1904 Lonsdale eloped with Leslie Brooke Hoggan the daughter of Lieutenant-Colonel William Brooke Hoggan of St Helier. The couple were married in Weymouth, Dorset on 4 August, and after the wedding service Leslie returned to stay with her parents on Jersey because her husband had no money to support her in England. He sold a play to the comic actor Willie Edouin for £500; it was not produced and Edouin died not long afterwards. Lonsdale later rewrote the play as the highly successful On Approval. To earn some more money his wife joined William Greet's company as a chorus-girl. When she told Greet that her husband was a playwright he asked to see examples of his work. Having read them, Greet told Lonsdale that although the plays were not of the type he produced, they might be of interest to Frank Curzon, to whom he had sent them.

Lonsdale and his wife had three daughters, Maria, Frances and Mab, the second of whom became his biographer shortly after his death. According to an article in The Genealogist in 2011, Lonsdale also had an illegitimate daughter called Angela Worthington, who married Robin Fox and was the mother of the actors Edward and James Fox and the producer Robert Fox.

=== First West End successes ===
Curzon put Lonsdale under contract and paid him a modest allowance until the first of his plays were presented nearly three years later. On 3 September 1908 Curzon produced The King of Cadonia at the Prince of Wales Theatre; this was a musical comedy with a book by Lonsdale, lyrics by Adrian Ross and Arthur Wimperis and music by Sidney Jones and Frederick Rosse. It ran for 333 performances at a time when any run of more than 250 performances was considered notable. The following week Curzon presented The Early Worm at Wyndham's Theatre; it was a non-musical farce, starring Weedon Grossmith and Fanny Brough and ran until late November. In 1909 and 1910 Curzon staged another play by Lonsdale and another musical comedy with a book by him, co-written by Curzon: The Best People at Wyndham's and The Balkan Princess at the Prince of Wales. According to Lonsdale's obituarist in The Times the former, although it had only a moderate run of sixty performances, was "a comedy that served as model for almost everything he attempted later ... an adroit and witty trifle, bearing no close resemblance to life as it is lived, about the philanderings of the idle rich".

After The Balkan Princess, except for a revue sketch for Charles Hawtrey, Lonsdale's next five works for the theatre were all musical comedies. He wrote or co-wrote the books of Betty (1915), High Jinks (1916), The Maid of the Mountains (1917), Monsieur Beaucaire (1919) and The Lady of the Rose (1922). His collaborators included the lyricists Adrian Ross, Otto Harbach and Harry Graham and the composers André Messager, Rudolph Friml, Jean Gilbert and Harold Fraser-Simson. All had excellent runs and The Maid of the Mountains, with 1,352 performances, became the second-longest running musical play in a West End theatre to that date.

=== Drawing-room comedies ===
After these musical successes Lonsdale returned to spoken comedy with Aren't We All?. Although it was far from his greatest success at the box-office – running for only 58 performances – Lonsdale regarded it as his best play. Mullin writes of Lonsdale's later drawing-room comedies that they are known for "their cynical, epigrammatic wit, sparkling dialogue, and deft manipulation of farcically unlikely situations". He was often compared to his elder and younger contemporaries Somerset Maugham and Noël Coward. Like the latter he was a boy from the lower-middle classes writing about the behaviour and idiosyncrasies of the upper classes, but, in Mullin's words, "his success, self-confidence, and reputation as an entertaining talker and bon viveur won him many friends among that class".

Returning to musical comedy, Lonsdale wrote the English version of the book for Leo Fall's Madame Pompadour in conjunction with Harry Graham, who also wrote the lyrics. Starring Evelyn Laye, with a supporting cast including Bertram Wallis, Derek Oldham and Huntley Wright, the piece opened at Daly's Theatre in December 1923 and ran for 469 performances. Three more musical shows followed during the 1920s The Street Singer, with Percy Greenbank (lyrics) and Harold Fraser-Simson (music); Katja the Dancer, with Harry Graham (lyrics) and Jean Gilbert (music); Lady Mary, with John Hastings Turner (book), Harry Graham (lyrics), and Albert Sirmay and Jerome Kern (music).

In between these musical shows, Lonsdale wrote five non-musical plays, including two of his best-known and most revived: The Last of Mrs Cheyney (1925) and On Approval (1927). The first of these was produced at the St James's Theatre, with the leading roles played by Gladys Cooper, Ellis Jeffreys, Ronald Squire, and Gerald Du Maurier and ran for 514 performances in London, and did well also in New York, Berlin and Paris.

=== Later years ===
After the 1920s Lonsdale's plays were less in fashion than before. Mullin writes that theatregoers' taste were changed by the Great Depression and the Second World War, making drawing-room comedy and the problems of the rich less appealing. He turned to writing for the cinema, producing screenplays for The Devil to Pay! (1930) and Lovers Courageous (1932) for MGM and The Private Life of Don Juan (1934) for Alexander Korda. Of three plays he wrote for Broadway in the 1930s, two were modest successes and one an outright failure.

In 1938 Lonsdale decided to settle in the US, where he remained throughout the Second World War. After the war he returned occasionally to England, and after 1950 he lived in France, in hotels in Cannes and Paris. On a visit to London he died in the street as he was walking back from dinner at Claridges with Sir John Marriott, with whom he had been staying.

== Critical response ==
In its obituary of Lonsdale, The Times called him "a most entertaining, deft, and successful playwright, an unerring craftsman in his own vein of artificial light comedy". It continued:

Lonsdale's feeling for the theatre, it might fairly be said, matched very closely the circumstances and temper of theatre audiences ... in the period between the wars. Slight and artificial of substance, rather narrowly concerned with the amorous and other vagaries of the titled and the very rich, his comedies projected, as a rule, a gaily nonsensical or impudent situation and drew much of their effect from a cascade of cynical wit and epigram.

In the 1980s The Stage commented that Lonsdale's work was in the Pinero tradition with a lacing of Wildean epigrams, but that although his works still gave pleasure, they are not on the same dramatic level as those of Wilde or Coward.

Coward himself commented, after attending a revival of The Last of Mrs Cheyney in 1967, that now "Freddie Lonsdale's dialogue sounds curiously laboured and dated". The Oxford Companion to the Theatre (2003) comments that Lonsdale is best remembered as the author of a number of comedies of contemporary manners "somewhat in the style of Somerset Maugham, though with less subtlety".

== West End and Broadway plays ==
Title	Collaborators	Theatre (London except where stated)	Date	Performances
The King of Cadonia	Adrian Ross and Arthur Wimperis (lyrics) and Sidney Jones and Frederick Rosse (music)	Prince of Wales Theatre	3 September 1908	330
The Early Worm		Wyndham's Theatre	7 September 1908	77
The Best People		Wyndham's	5 August 1909	60
The Balkan Princess	Frank Curzon (book), Paul Rubens (music and lyrics) and Arthur Wimperis (lyrics)	Prince of Wales	19 February 1910	176
Betty	Gladys Unger (book), Ross and Rubens (lyrics) and Rubens and Ernest Steffan (music)	Daly's Theatre	24 April 1915	391
High Jinks	Otto Harbach and Leo Ditrichstein (lyrics) and Rudolph Friml (music)	Adelphi Theatre	24 August 1916	383
The Maid of the Mountains	Harry Graham, Frank Clifford Harris and Valentine (lyrics) and Harold Fraser-Simson and James W. Tate (music)	Daly's	10 February 1917	1,352
Monsieur Beaucaire	Adrian Ross (lyrics) and André Messager (music)	Prince's Theatre	19 April 1919	221
The Lady of the Rose	Jean Gilbert (music)	Daly's	21 February 1922	514
Aren't We All?		Globe Theatre	10 April 1923	58
Madame Pompadour	Harry Graham (lyrics) and Leo Fall (music)	Daly's	10 December 1923	469
The Fake		Apollo Theatre	13 March 1924	211
The Street Singer	Percy Greenbank (lyrics) and Harold Fraser-Simson (music)	Lyric Theatre, London	27 June 1924	360
Spring Cleaning		Eltinge Theatre, New York; St Martin's Theatre	29 January 1925; 9 November 1923	292; 262
Katja the Dancer	Harry Graham (lyrics) and Jean Gilbert (music)	Gaiety Theatre, London	21 February 1925	505
The Last of Mrs Cheyney		St James's Theatre	22 September 1925	514
On Approval		Fortune Theatre	19 April 1927	469
The High Road		Shaftesbury Theatre	7 September 1927	237
Lady Mary	John Hastings Turner (book), Harry Graham (lyrics), and Albert Sirmay and Jerome Kern (music)	Daly's	23 February 1928	181
Canaries Sometimes Sing		Globe Theatre	21 October 1929	144
Never Come Back		Phoenix Theatre, London	28 October 1932	58
Once Is Enough		Henry Miller Theatre, New York	15 February 1938	105
Foreigners		Belasco Theatre, New York	5 December 1939	7
Another Love Story		Fulton Theatre, New York; Phoenix	12 October 1943; 13 December 1944	103; 173
But for the Grace of God		St James's	3 September 1946	201
The Way Things Go		Phoenix	2 March 1950	155

== Sources ==
- Coward, Noël (1982). Payn, Graham; Sheridan Morley (eds.). The Noël Coward Diaries (1941–1969). London: Methuen. ISBN 978-0-297-78142-4.
- Gaye, Freda, ed. (1967). Who's Who in the Theatre (fourteenth ed.). London: Sir Isaac Pitman and Sons. OCLC 5997224.
- Donaldson, Frances (1957). Freddy Lonsdale. London: Heinemann. OCLC 2313952.
