= Sidney Jones (composer) =

English conductor and composer

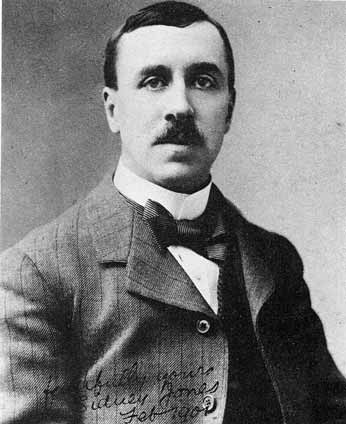
Sidney Jones

James Sidney Jones (17 June 1861 – 29 January 1946), usually credited as Sidney Jones, was an English conductor and composer, who was most famous for composing the musical scores for a series of musical comedy hits in the late Victorian and Edwardian periods. Jones's most famous musical was The Geisha, but several of his pieces were among the most popular shows of the era, enjoying long runs, international tours and revivals.

In 1892, after nine years of conducting touring companies of British operettas for Alfred Cellier and George Edwardes, Edwardes engaged Jones to conduct several operettas and musical comedies in London. Jones had begun composing incidental music and supplemental songs for some of the shows he conducted and even wrote scores of his own in 1889 and 1892. In 1893, one of his songs, "Linger Longer, Loo", composed for the 1892 burlesque Don Juan at the Gaiety Theatre, became popular throughout the English-speaking world.

Jones's first hit show was A Gaiety Girl (1893), one of the first major successes of the Edwardian musical comedy genre. A series of Jones hits followed: An Artist's Model (1894), The Geisha (1896), A Greek Slave (1898) and San Toy (1899). After this, Jones had less frequent and intense successes, but his more popular shows included My Lady Molly (1902), See See (1906), King of Cadonia (1908), The Girl from Utah (1913) and The Happy Day (1916).

== Life and career ==
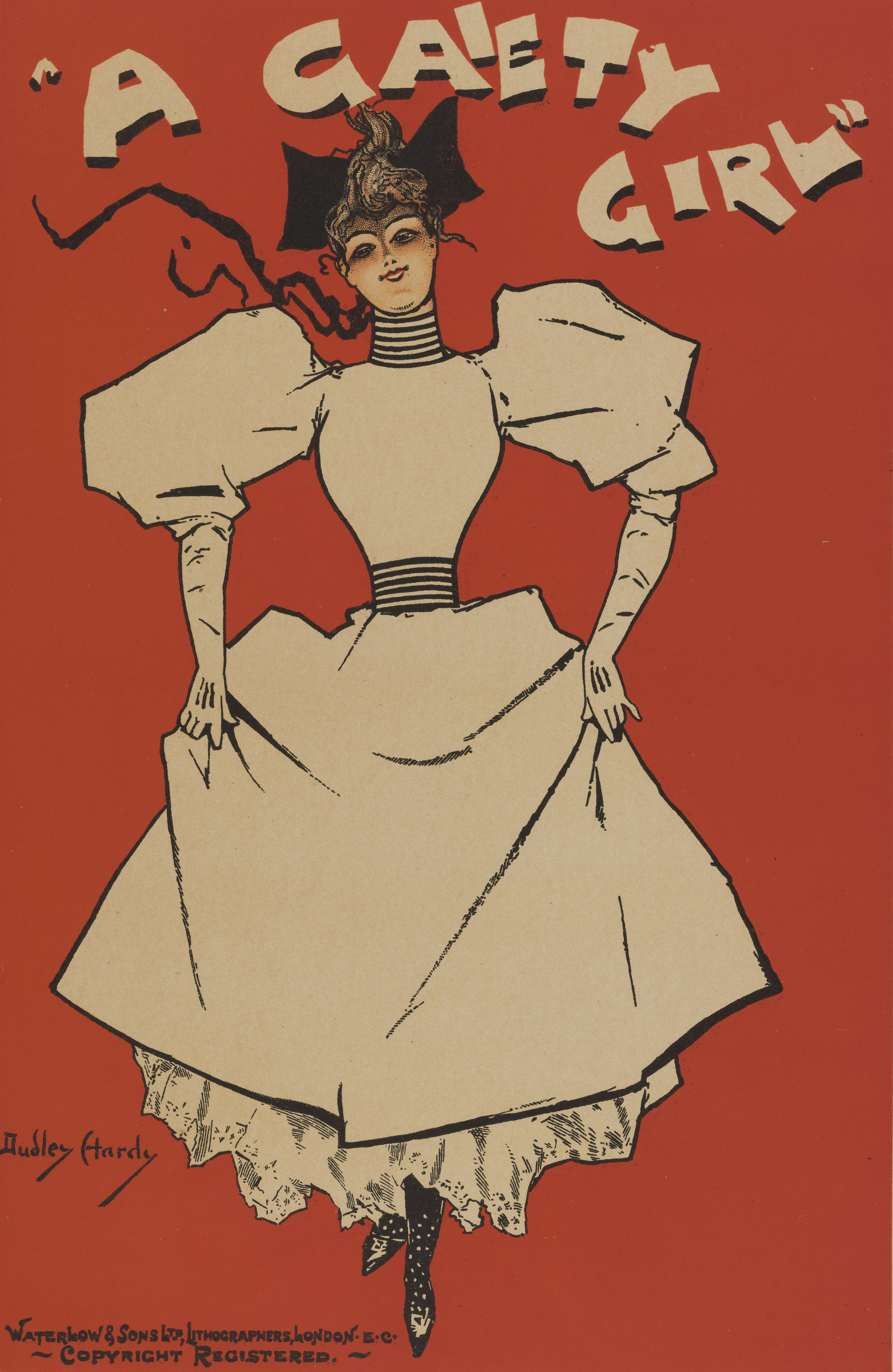
Theatre poster

Jones was born in Islington, London. His father, James Sidney Jones, Sr. (1837–1914) originally of Suffolk, was a military bandmaster. His mother was Ann Jones, née Eycott. As a child, Jones moved frequently as his father was transferred to new military stations in England and Ireland. The young Jones learned to play a variety of instruments in the band. In Dublin, he studied with Sir Robert Stewart (1825–1894) of Trinity College. The family later moved to Leeds, where his father became conductor of the Leeds Rifles, was the musical director of the Leeds Grand Theatre and later conducted a band and the Spa Orchestra at Harrogate. Jones was the eldest son and second of six children. His youngest brother, Guy Sidney Jones (1875–1959), also became a conductor and composer whose musical scores included The Gay Gordons (1907).

In 1885, Jones married Kate Linley, an actress, and the couple produced five children.

=== Early career ===
Jones gained his first professional experience playing the clarinet in his father's band and orchestra. He also gave piano lessons. In 1882, he was hired as a conductor for tours of operettas and other musical theatre pieces, such as Robert Planquette's Les Cloches de Corneville and a popular American musical show, Fun on the Bristol. He next toured with the Vokes family and also composed incidental music and songs for their farcical entertainment. In Camp. In 1886, actress/producer Kate Santley engaged Jones as musical director for the tour of her musical Vetah.

Jones then worked for Henry Leslie for nearly four years as conductor of tours of Alfred Cellier's comic opera hit Dorothy (starring Lucy Carr Shaw, sister to George Bernard Shaw), Doris and The Red Hussar. He was then music director for a tour of the Gaiety Theatre piece Little Jack Sheppard under the management of comedian J. J. Dallas. After that, George Edwardes hired him as musical director for the Gaiety Theatre's 1891 tour of America and Australia, conducting the burlesques Ruy Blas and the Blasé Roué and Cinder-Ellen Up-too-Late. He briefly returned to conducting in the British provinces, but in 1892, after nine years of touring, Edwardes hired Jones to conduct the musical In Town at the Prince of Wales Theatre on London's West End. He next was musical director for another West End musical, Morocco Bound (1893), and for the London production of The Gay Parisienne (1896).

=== First composing successes ===
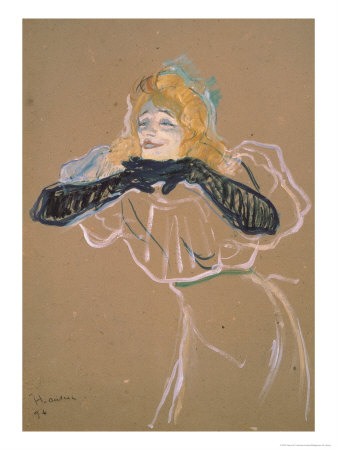
Yvette Guilbert singing "Linger Longer, Loo"

At the same time as these conducting engagements, Jones had begun composing incidental music and songs as needed for the shows he conducted. In 1889, he wrote the musical score for the pantomime Aladdin II, which played at Leeds. When Edwardes's touring company produced Cinder Ellen in Australia, Jones wrote a dance number that was added to Meyer Lutz's score. Jones also composed an operetta, Our Family Legend (1892), with a libretto by Reginald Stockton, which was produced at Brighton. In 1893, one of his songs, "Linger Longer, Loo" was added to Lutz's 1892 burlesque Don Juan at the Gaiety Theatre. The song became popular throughout the English-speaking world and inspired a drawing by Toulouse-Lautrec of Yvette Guilbert singing it.

In 1893, for A Gaiety Girl, with a libretto by Owen Hall, Edwardes gave Jones the opportunity to write the music, and the result was a hit show that enjoyed a long run and toured internationally, setting the trend for a new genre of popular musical theatre that came to be known as Edwardian musical comedy. The ballad "Sunshine above" from the show was popular parlour song. Jones's style was similar in technique to the music of Arthur Sullivan and Cellier, which Jones had conducted for so long, but it was lighter and breezier, appealing to the popular tastes of the time.

=== Daly's Theatre years and later years ===
Jones soon became house composer and music director for George Edwardes's new Daly's Theatre. After A Gaiety Girl, Jones again collaborated with Hall and lyricist Harry Greenbank to produce another success, An Artist's Model (1894), which ran for fifteen months. This was followed by three of the most successful musical comedies of the 1890s: The Geisha (1896), A Greek Slave (1898), and San Toy (1899). Jones's musical plays were "written in a more musically substantial style than the featherweight entertainment given at the Gaiety. Their librettos sported a solid and serious romantic backbone (confided to the baritone hero Hayden Coffin and the soprano Marie Tempest) alongside their comic and soubrette elements, and the scores which Jones provided included, alongside the lighter material, numbers sentimental and dramatic, as well as some impressive and vocally demanding concerted ensembles and finales."

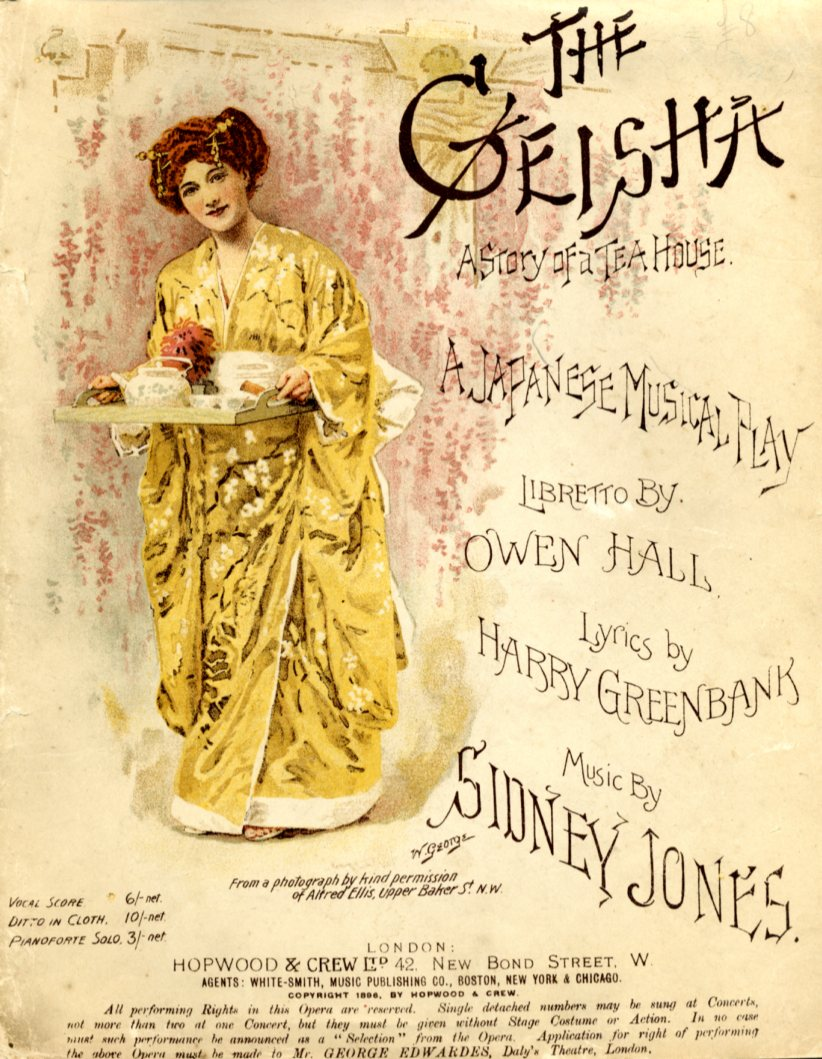
Cover of the Vocal Score

Jones song from The Geisha, "The Amorous Goldfish" became an oft-sung hit, as did several of his other songs for these shows. The Geisha and San Toy took advantage of the fad for oriental settings in musical theatre that had reached a peak in Gilbert and Sullivan's The Mikado in 1885. These two musicals were frequently revived, recorded and widely toured in Europe as well as throughout the English-speaking world. The former became the most frequently-performed English-language work of musical theatre in Europe for many decades. The piece figures prominently in Anton Chekhov's popular short story, The Lady with the Dog, and it was adapted as a Russian film in 1959 that featured its music, including "The Amorous Goldfish".

Other musicals followed, but Jones's only real successes during this period were My Lady Molly (produced by Jones) in 1902 and King of Cadonia in 1908 (produced by Frank Curzon), although See-See (with a book by Charles Brookfield and lyrics by Adrian Ross) did reasonably well in 1906 at the Prince of Wales Theatre, starring Denise Orme in the title role. As musical director at the Empire Theatre, Jones wrote the ballets, The Bugle Call (1905) and Cinderella (1906), which was danced at Christmas-time. Later, back at the light-hearted Gaiety Theatre, with The Girl from Utah in 1913, and at Daly's Theatre, with The Happy Day in 1916, Jones achieved two last successes. However, Jones, like his sometime collaborator Lionel Monckton, fell victim to changing musical fashions around the time of World War I, such as syncopated dance rhythms like ragtime, and retired from composition.

Jones died at his home at Kew, Surrey, at the age of 84.

== Major works and collaborations ==
Cover of the Vocal Score

- 1889 Aladdin II
- 1892 Our Family Legend
- 1892 Don Juan ("Linger Longer, Loo" contributed)
- 1893 A Gaiety Girl
- 1894 An Artist's Model
- 1896 The Geisha
- 1898 A Greek Slave
- 1899 San Toy
- 1902 My Lady Molly
- 1903 The Medal and the Maid
- 1905 The Bugle Call (ballet)
- 1906 Cinderella (ballet)
- 1906 See See
- 1908 King of Cadonia
- 1909 A Persian Princess
- 1913 The Girl from Utah
- 1916 The Happy Day
