= Coralie Blythe =

English actress and singer (1881–1928)

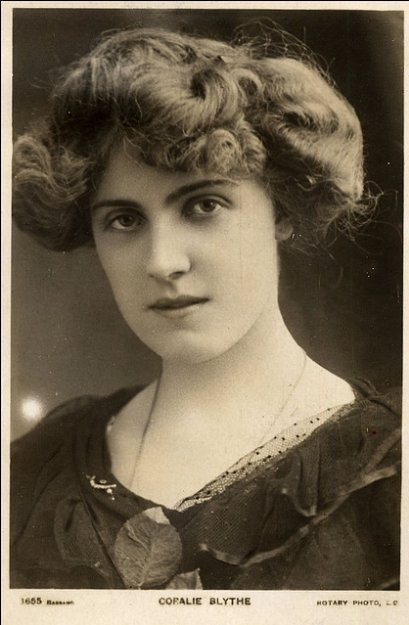
- Blythe c. 1906
- Born: Caroline Maud Blyth; January 28, 1881; Bow, London, U.K.
- Died: July 24, 1928 (aged 47); U.S.
- Resting place: Woodlawn Cemetery, New York City
- Occupation: Actress
- Years active: 1894–1928
- Spouse: Lawrence Grossmith (m. 1908–1928)
- Relatives: Vernon Castle (brother)

Coralie Blythe (born Caroline Maud Blyth; 28 January 1881 – 24 July 1928), was an English actress and singer, who is best remembered for her numerous postcard photos and her roles in Edwardian musical comedy. Although she never became a big star, she worked steadily in London's West End and in British provincial theatres from her teen years until after World War I, especially for producer George Edwardes, and had a few roles in America. She sometimes performed with her husband, Lawrence Grossmith, and her brother, Vernon Castle.

== Early life and career ==
Born in Bow in London, she was the eldest of three children of William Thomas Blyth (born 1857), a publican, and his wife Jane (née Finley) (1862–1897), an actress. Her brother was the dancer Vernon Castle.

Blythe's early theatrical appearances included West End roles replacing Marie Studholme as Gladys Stourton in the Edwardian musical A Gaiety Girl (1894) and in a pantomime, Santa Claus, over Christmas 1894. She had three roles in George Edwardes shows at the Prince's Theatre, Bristol: Lucille in The Circus Girl (1897–1898), Ada Branscombe in Three Little Maids (1902, also at the Theatre Royal, Nottingham) and The Orchid (1904–1905). In between these, she appeared at Edwardes's Gaiety Theatre in London in chorus roles in The Circus Girl, A Runaway Girl, A Greek Slave, San Toy and The Messenger Boy. In 1900 Blythe toured Britain in San Toy, and in 1901 she appeared in The Silver Slipper at the Lyric Theatre in London. Later that year, she played the small role of Maisie in The Toreador.

== Peak years and marriage ==
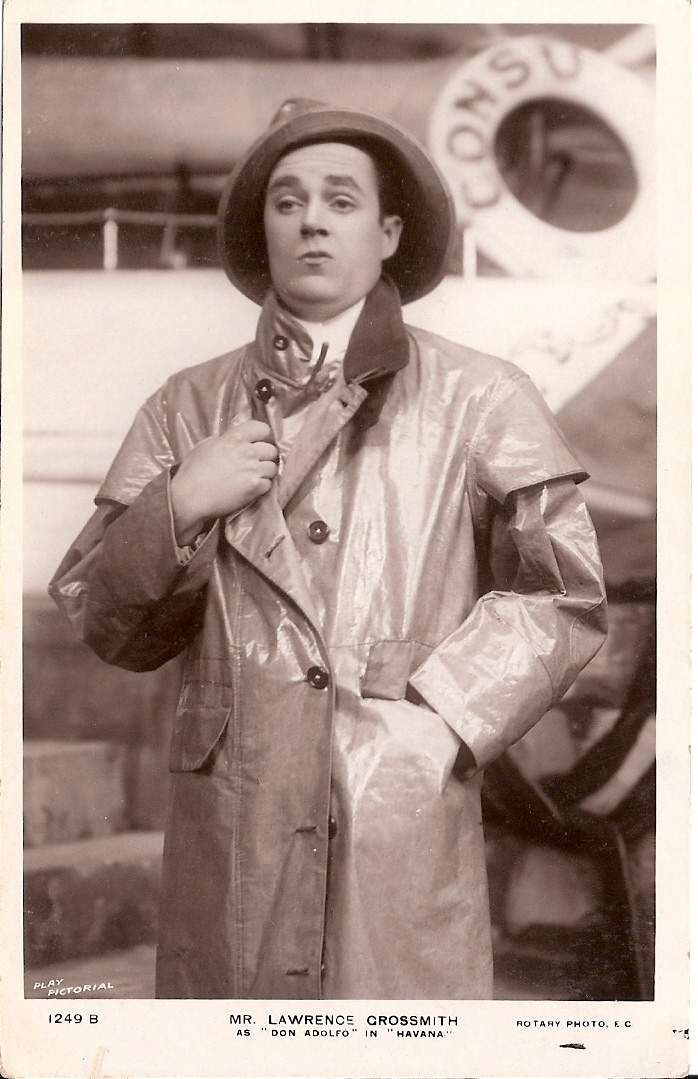
Blythe's husband Lawrence Grossmith in Havana (1908)

Within a few years, Blythe was a popular postcard beauty. She played Louise in Mr Popple (of Ippleton) at the Apollo Theatre (1905) and was Gretchen in Two Naughty Boys at the Gaiety in 1906. This was followed by Susie in The Girl Behind the Counter (1906) at Wyndham's Theatre. A 1905 interview, when she was appearing in a revival of Mr Popple (of Ippleton), contained the following:

"I have never been late for a cue," said Miss Coralie Blythe, as she arranged the masses of beautiful fair hair that she "lets down" so effectively during her dance in Mr. Popple, "I have never had any adventures, I have never forgotten my part, and things have always gone just as they should; so you see there really is nothing for me to talk about," and Miss Blythe gazed meditatively into her own blue eyes as they gazed back at her in the mirror. "Things usually happen to most people, and if I had a fine imagination I would tell you that I had fallen from a flying machine and been caught on one of the arms of the golden cross of St. Paul's Cathedral, and had then been rescued by an adventurous youth who crawled over the dome and carried me down in his arms. It would make a good story, but people wouldn't believe it, and would say rude things about my imagination. One day I will try and manufacture some real good anecdotes – oh, I mean quite nice ones and then I will get them printed, and everybody will say, 'Dear me, what an interesting life she must lead!'"

The banns for her marriage to the actor Lawrence Grossmith, a son of George Grossmith, the comic actor, singer and writer known for his work with Gilbert and Sullivan, were first read in May 1896, but the marriage did not take place, probably because of the extreme youth of the couple at that time. They finally married in London on 2 June 1904.

In 1906 Grossmith and Blythe were invited to perform in New York by Lew Fields; she took her brother Vernon Castle with her. Later in 1906 the three of them appeared at the Herald Square Theatre on Broadway in the musical revue About Town. Back in London, she appeared in The White Chrysanthemum and played Ethel Trevor in The Three Kisses, by Percy Greenbank, Leedham Bantock and Howard Talbot (1907) at the Apollo. In 1908 she appeared as Mitzi in The Girls of Gottenberg and as Phyllis Tuppet in a revival of Dorothy at the New Theatre. She next returned to the Prince's Theatre in Bristol in The Gay Gordons (1908–1909) and as Martje in The Girl in the Train (1910–1911). In between these, in 1909, she played Cesarine de Noce in The Dashing Little Duke at the Hicks Theatre in London and then toured as Consuelo in Havana.

== Later years ==
In 1915 she and Grossmith appeared in Bolton and Rubens's musical comedy Nobody Home on Broadway, with music by Jerome Kern, which transferred to the Princess Theatre in 1916. For the rest of her career, she would frequently return to Great Britain to appear in musical comedies.

On 23 May 1928 she sailed from Britain back to the United States, where she died on 24 July 1928, aged 47. She was buried beside her brother Vernon Castle in Woodlawn Cemetery in New York City. On his death in 1944, her husband Lawrence Grossmith was buried beside her.
