= Hobnail (disambiguation) =

A hobnail is a short nail with a thick head: used to increase the durability of boot soles.

Hobnail may also refer to:

- A pattern of glassware: (sometimes called Fenton Hobnail) where the body of the piece has a regular array of bumps, as if finished with glass hobnails
- A popular song from 1907, performed by Billy Williams
- "Hobnailed liver" is medical jargon for cirrhosis of the liver
- Cellular morphology pathognomonic for clear cell adenocarcinoma of the ovary
