= Miss Hook of Holland =

English musical comedy

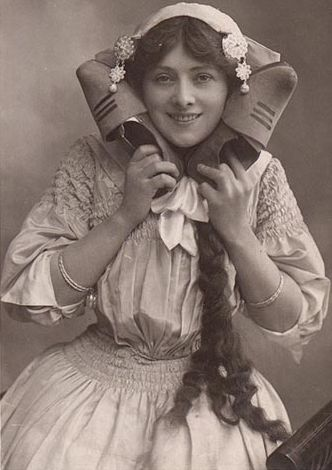
Isabel Jay as Sally

Miss Hook of Holland is an English musical comedy (styled a "Dutch Musical Incident") in two acts, with music and lyrics by Paul Rubens with a book by Austen Hurgon and Rubens. The show was produced by Frank Curzon and opened at the Prince of Wales Theatre on 31 January 1907, running for a very successful 462 performances. It starred Harry Grattan and Isabel Jay.

The show also had a Broadway run starring Bertram Wallis and an Australian production in 1907 and enjoyed various tours and revivals, including a 1914 revival starring Phyllis Dare. There was also a "matinee version" of the show called Little Miss Hook of Holland, played by children for children. The musical was popular with amateur theatre groups, particularly in Britain, from 1911 through the 1950s.

1907 was a busy year on the London stage with numerous other notable openings, including The Girls of Gottenberg, The Merry Widow, and Tom Jones.

== Roles and original cast ==
G. P. Huntley as Mr. Hook

- Mr. Hook, a widower, a wealthy liqueur distiller – G. P. Huntley
- Sally, Miss Hook of Holland – Isabel Jay
- Captain Adrian Papp – Herbert Clayton
- Lieutenant de Coop – B. S. Foster
- Bandmaster van Vuyt – F. Pope Stamper
- Ludwig Schnapps, Foreman of the distillery, in love with Mina – Harry Grattan
- An old policeman – Morris Harvey
- Hans Maas, A cheese merchant at Arndyk – J. B. Fraser
- Hendrick Draek, a villager at Arndyk – Ralph Holland
- Van Eck, a very ordinary Dutchman – A. E. E. Edwards
- Simon Slinks, a loafer by the canal at Arndyk – George Barrett
- Miss Voss, really Mrs Voos, a widow but posing as a spinster – Phoebe Mercer
- Freda and Clara Voos, her daughters – Gwendoline Brogden and Gladys Ivory
- Gretchen, Manageress at the Distillery – Eva Kelly
- Thekla, a market girl – Maisie Stather
- Mina, maid to the Hooks – Gracie Leigh
- Chorus of market folk, soldiers, cheese merchants, villagers, assistants at the Liqueur Distillery, etc.

== Synopsis ==
Librettist Austen Hurgon

Act I -- In the Cheese Market at Arndyk, on the borders of the Zuyder Zee, Holland

Mrs. Hook died young, leaving her husband with a daughter, little Sally Hook. Ludwig Schnapps, the foreman of Mr. Hook's factory, tells the story of how pretty little Miss Hook possessed a remarkable aptitude for business. By force of her character and her shrewdness, plus her invention of a wonderful liqueur called "Cream of the Sky", Mr. Hook found himself at the head of a thriving establishment, with a considerable fortune in the bank. Simon Slinks, the leader of a group of lazy loafers picks up a piece of paper accidentally dropped by Mr. Hook, which turns out to be the secret recipe for Cream of the Sky. The cheese merchants arrive, followed by a dashing officer, Adrian Papp, who heads the local army unit. Papp is courting Sally, but she seems to prefer the Bandmaster van Vuyt.

Slinks sells the secret recipe to Papp, telling him that its return will help him with Sally. Sally's maid Mina flirts with the foreman, Schnapps. The loss of the recipe is discovered, and Mr. Hook announces that he will give a reward for its return, knowing that people who find things usually turn out to have been the original thief. Papp announces that he will find and return the missing paper before the next day's fete in Amsterdam is over. His rival, van Vuyt, says that he will also go to Amsterdam the next day.

Act II—Inside Mr. Hook's liqueur distillery in Amsterdam.

Mina finds Schnapps flirting with Gretchen. He pacifies her by revealing that he bought a petticoat for her at the fete. This is the fifteenth petticoat this year that she has been given by admirers. Van Vuyt and Sally share a moment, before Sally catches Papp flirting with Freda Voos, allowing van Vuyt to emerge as the victor for Sally's hand. The recipe finds its way back to Mr. Hook.

== Musical numbers ==
Hook and Papp

Act I

- No. 1 – Opening Chorus – "To market, to market, the whole world is going..."
- No. 2 – Song – Schnapps & Chorus – "Mister Hook started quite low down in life, in a tiny distillery with a fat lumpy wife..."
- No. 3 – Knitting Sextet – Orphans & Girls – "We are little orphans, you can tell us at a glance..."
- No. 4 – Slinks & Chorus of Men – "We're a lot of lazy loafers, Oh! we recognise it's true..."
- No. 5 – Song – Sally – "A little paper toy at best, a thing as frail as any flower..."
- No. 6 – Cheese Chorus – "We've purchased our meat for dinner, bought the best of all we can find..."
- No. 7 – Song – Papp & Chorus – "Our enemies may choose to scorn the land that we control..."
- No. 8 – Duet – Van Vuyt & Sally, with Chorus – "When the sun is aglow in the west, 'tis the hour of the lover..."
- No. 9 – Song – Mina & Chorus – "There lived a young Dutchman of whom you have heard..."
- No. 10 – Trio – Schnapps, Slinks & Hook, with Chorus – "Ev'ry Dutchman when he wakes, a little piece of cheese he takes..."
- No. 11 – Song – Van Vuyt & Chorus – "Is there any other man so envied in the land..."
- No. 12 – Finale Act I – "Is it insubordination? What is all this noise about? Somebody is in disgrace..."

Act II

Eva Kelly as Gretchen

- No. 13 – Opening Chorus – "Any time you're passing, if there should be anything that you require..."
- No. 14 – Unaccompanied Madrigal – "Life inside a Dutch distillery doesn't leave much time for play..."
- No. 15 – Song – Freda – "In an old Dutch town once a bold young man loved a maid with a burning passion..."
- No. 16 – Song – Sally & Girls – "Little Miss Wooden Shoes, ev'ryone knows, had dear little feet and divine little toes..."
- No. 17 – Song – Mina – "I've been spoilt such a lot. It's my fault? No, it's not! It's the men won't leave me alone! ..."
- No. 18 – Duet – Sally & Van Vuyt – "Love is a carnival, and one that's free to all of us..."
- No. 19 – Concerted Number – "Mister Hook had arranged his house entirely on a novel plan..."
- No. 20 – Dance
- No. 21 – Song – Van Vuyt & Chorus of Girls – "Had you and I met in those far distant days that are past..."
- No. 22 – Duet – Mina & Schnapps – "In a little coat of straw stood a bottle of Schnapps..."
- No. 23 – Song – Schnapps & Chorus – "An Englishman, some years ago, had a scheme that dumb-founded the earth..."
- No. 24 – Song – Sally – "To ev'ry sun-clad nation belongs that country's good wine..."
- No. 25 – Finale Act II – "With his tra! lal, la, la, la..."

Addenda:

- No. 26 – Song – Sally – "English girls when they make love simple language are above..."
- No. 27 – Song – Mina – "I've never been inside a big town before..."
- No. 28 – Song – Van Vuyt – "Before he became a Conductor of a beautiful band of brass..."
- No. 29 – Song – Slinks – "I wonder who on earth the fool could have been who first invented work? ..."
