= Violet Englefield =

British actress (1881–1946)

Violet Englefield and Lawrence Grossmith in The Girl Behind the Counter (1906)

Violet Englefield (1881 – 22 March 1946) (born as Maud Violet Englefield) was a British actress and singer known for her musical theatre performances in London's West End and on Broadway in the first two decades of the 20th century.

== Career ==
Born in Hounslow, she was the daughter of Joel Englefield (1846-1912), an army bandmaster, and Ellen Cashel Cross (née Bevan); all of their children were trained musicians. In 1904, she had an illegitimate son, Juan Englefield, with the actor Harry Chart. It is not known what became of the child.

Englefield's British acting credits included Dick Whittington (1899) at the Theatre Royal, Edinburgh, during which she played a violin solo which was "a conspicuous feature of the performance", playing the Prince in the pantomime Cinderella at the King's Theatre, Edinburgh (1906), Millie Mostyn in The Girl Behind the Counter at Wyndham's Theatre (1906–07), the lead role of Bess Moore in The Bad Girl of the Family at the Elephant and Castle Theatre (1909) followed by a Christmas season of the same play at the Aldwych Theatre.

On Broadway her appearances included Gussie Pope in Fancy Free (1918), The Passing Show of 1918 at the Winter Garden Theatre (1918), part of the Rigoletto Quartette in The Passing Show of 1921 at the Winter Garden Theatre (1920–21), and Mrs. Horridge in the revue Sky High at the Winter Garden Theatre and later the Casino Theatre (1925). After this production Englefield retired from the stage.

== Family life ==
In 1913, she married Jerrard Grant Allen (1878-1964), a theatrical agent/manager and the son of Grant Allen, the science writer and novelist. They had a son, Reginald "Reggie" Grant Allen (1910-1985). Deep in debt, in 1916, the couple left Liverpool for New York, intending to settle there permanently, but their young son did not leave Britain to join them until early 1917. By 1920, the Allen family were living at 119 E. 82nd St, New York. In 1930, the family was living in Norwalk, Connecticut, and Jerrard Allen and Violet Englefield were registered US citizens by this date. In about 1939 the couple retired to Lake Worth in Florida.

Violet Englefield died in March 1946 at West Palm Beach in Florida.
