= The Happy Day =

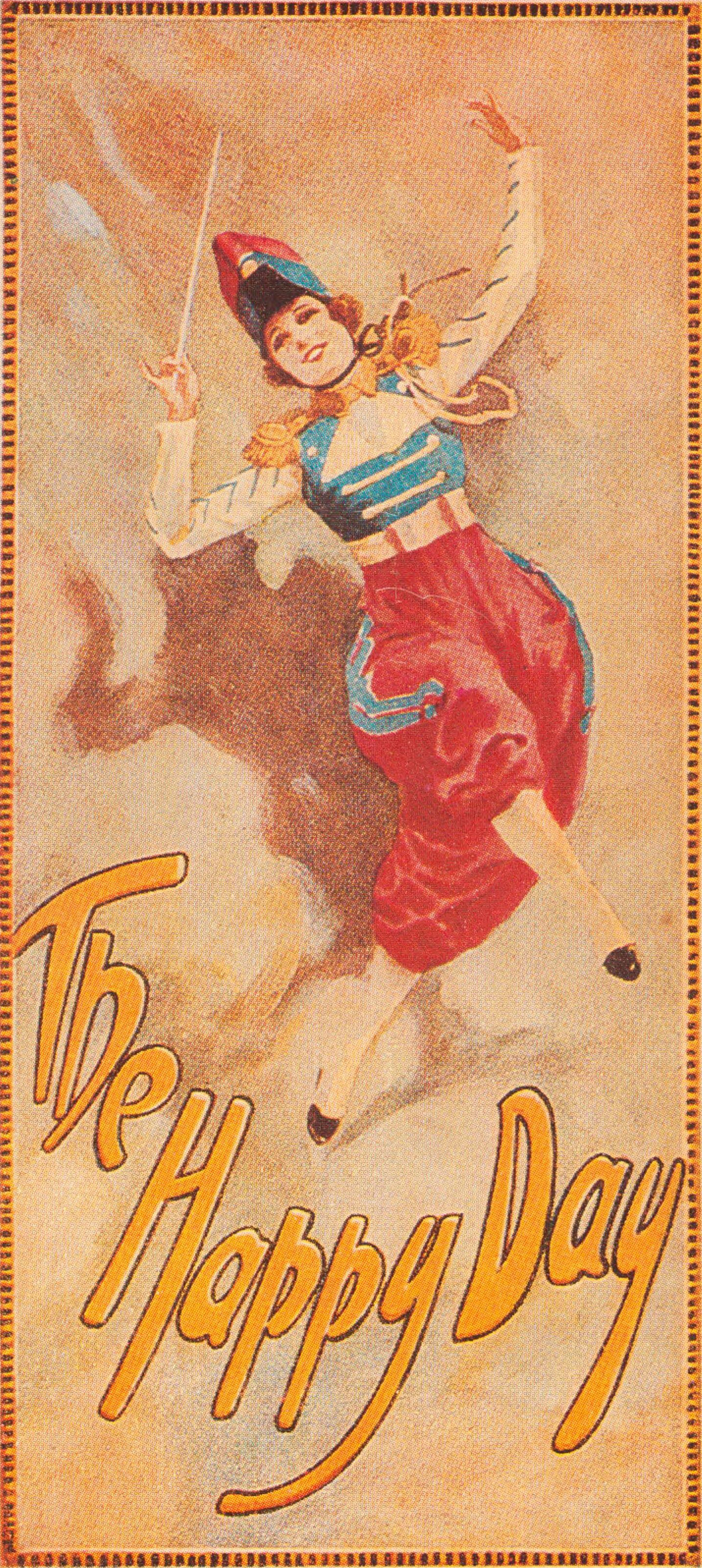
- Postcard
- Music: Sidney Jones and Paul Rubens
- Lyrics: Adrian Ross and Rubens
- Book: Seymour Hicks
- Productions: 1916 West End

The Happy Day is a musical comedy in two acts by Seymour Hicks, with music by Sidney Jones and Paul Rubens, and lyrics by Adrian Ross and Rubens. It was produced by George Edwardes's company (by the estate's executor, Robert Evett) and was directed by Evett. Set in the fictional country of Valaria, the story concerns a royal couple who dislike each other but ultimately fall in love. A masquerade scene provides opportunities for mistaken identity.

The musical opened at Daly's Theatre in London on 13 May 1916 and ran for 241 performances. It starred Winifred Barnes, José Collins and Arthur Wontner, who played the Ruritanian prince. Later Bertram Wallis joined the cast.

== Background ==
The Happy Day opened during World War I in the same year as three other tremendously successful shows in London: Chu Chin Chow, Theodore & Co and The Bing Boys are Here. Audiences, including servicemen on leave, wanted light and uplifting entertainment during the war, and these shows delivered it. The show was Jones's last success. A review in The Illustrated London News commented that the costumes were "sumptuous" and praised the comedy and the music of the piece, as well as the cast, especially Collins "with her attractive voice and picturesque personality."

Popular songs from The Happy Day included "Bohemia" and "I Don't Seem to Want You When You're With Me".

== Roles and original cast members ==
- Charles, Prince of Galania – Arthur Wontner
- Sir Dennis O'hagan (His A.D.C.) – Frank Wilson
- Earl of Anglemere (The Princess's Equerry) – Thorpe Bates
- General Count Ivan Tobolsk (The Inspector-General)
- M. Drinkavink (The Director of the Casino)
- M. Oppinoff (The Chancellor of the Exchequer)
- M. Limitski (The Public Trustee)
- Walter (of London) – Lauri de Frece
- The Captain – G. P. Huntley
- Mary, Princess of Valaria – Winifred Barnes
- The Countess Tobolsk (Mistress of the Robes) – Rosina Filippi
- The Lady Diana Brooke (A Maid of Honour) – Nellie Taylor
- Luna L'etoile
- Ma Petite (of the Opera House) – Unity Moore
- Camille Joyeuse (a Queen of Bohemia) – José Collins
- Ladies of the Bedchamber, Courtiers, Soldiers, Peasants, Dancers, Guests, Servants, etc.

== Musical numbers ==
Winifred Barnes as the Princess

Act I

- Introduction (The Clock upon the palace tow'r)
- Diana "The Happy Day" (Wake, wake, for the sun is high)
- Girls "The Trousseau" (Her Highness's Trousseau)
- Anglemere ('Tis to-day I leave you for ever)
- Chorus (Assemble here to greet the bridegroom)
- Diana and Denis "England" (Come back again to the isle of the sea)
- Oppinoff, Limitsky and Drinkavink "Hang together" (We are in for dirty weather)
- Anglemere "Truant Love" (Cupid's terribly interfering)
- Chorus of Peasants "Little Mother" (Little Mother of our land)
- Mary "As poor as that" (When you've always had lots of money)
- Anglemere "Yours to the end" (Nothing I ask you now to give)
- Finale – Mary and Anglemere "Free" (Come away, and leave them all behind you)

Act II

- Chorus (It is jolly when you're dancing)
- Camille and Chorus "Bohemia" (Come away to the land of joy)
- Ma Petite and Chorus "Marching with the Band" (What is that music I hear in the street?)
- Chorus of Gendarmes (We've come here by the orders)
- Mary "I Dream, I Dream of you" (Shall I ever discover ?)
- Mary and Camille "Queen of Joy" (Oh, I know why you're here)
- Ma Petite and Walter "Peter Piper" (Mr. Peter Piper was a pocket sniper)
- Camille and Chorus "The Seasons" (When the Summer's blue above)
- Finale (I liked you first in the Summer)

Addenda

- Mary "I met Someone" (Something's gone wrong with me)
- Anglemere and Chorus "Love and War" (Always ready when the challenge comes)
