= The Street Singer (musical) =

1924 musical play

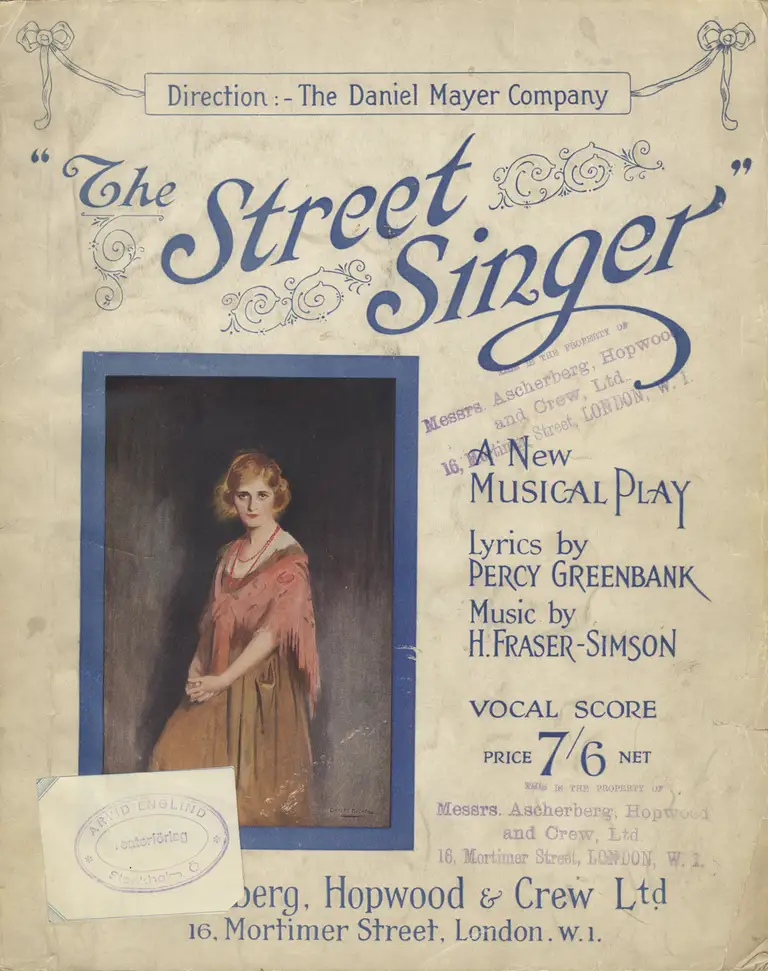
- Original language: English
- Written by: Frederick Lonsdale with music by Harold Fraser-Simson and lyrics by Percy Greenbank
- Genre: Musical

Premiere
- Date: 4 February 1924
- Place: Princes of Wales's Theatre, Birmingham; Lyric Theatre, London

The Street Singer is a 1924 musical play written by Frederick Lonsdale with music by Harold Fraser-Simson and lyrics by Percy Greenbank and additional songs by Ivy St. Helier.

After premiering at the Prince of Wales's Theatre, Birmingham it ran for 360 performances at the Lyric Theatre in the West End between 27 June 1924 and 2 May 1925. The cast included Phyllis Dare, Sylvia Leslie, Dorothy Fane, A.W. Baskcomb and Harry Welchman.

== Bibliography ==
- Wearing, J. P. The London Stage 1920-1929: A Calendar of Productions, Performers, and Personnel. Rowman & Littlefield, 2014.
