= The Girl Behind the Counter =

- Isabel Jay as Winnie Willoughby
- Music: Howard Talbot
- Lyrics: Arthur Anderson; Percy Greenbank
- Book: Arthur Anderson; Leedham Bantock
- Productions: 1906 West End; 1907 Broadway

The Girl Behind the Counter is an Edwardian musical comedy with a book by Arthur Anderson and Leedham Bantock, music by Howard Talbot and lyrics by Arthur Anderson (and additional lyrics by Percy Greenbank).

It opened at Wyndham's Theatre on 21 April 1906, produced by Frank Curzon and directed by Austen Hurgon. The farcical musical starred Isabel Jay, C. Hayden Coffin and Lawrence Grossmith. It ran for 141 performances in the original London production, and an adaptation ran for twice that long in 1907–08 on Broadway. The Broadway production was "freely adapted and reconstructed by Edgar Smith" and starred Lew Fields and Connie Ediss.

It toured successfully thereafter in the British provinces, the U.S., Australia and elsewhere and enjoyed several revivals.

== Synopsis of the Broadway version ==
[To come]

== Musical numbers ==
Maison Duval

Gussie in a fancy dress

Violet Englefield as Millie and Lawrence Grossmith as Gussie

Act I - The "Maison Duval."

- No. 1 - Chorus - "Hurry, scurry, to and fro..."
- No. 2 - Duval and Chorus - "Oh! ze managère discreet, 'e is very 'ard to beat..."
- No. 3 - Gussie - "It's jolly nice to be as deuced popular as I am..."
- No. 4 - Winnie - "Why should a maid bestow her hand..."
- No. 5 - Dudd and Susie - "I mean to start a fancy shop..."
- No. 6 - Customers and Chorus - "They've been shopping till they're dropping..."
- No. 7 - Charlie and Chorus - "A land there is o'er the ocean wide..."
- No. 8 - Winnie and Charlie - "Won't you buy a spray, or a choice bouquet..."
- No. 9 - Ninette and Chorus - "I'm a little lady who is rather fascinating..."
- No. 10 - Finale Act I - "Here's a situation! If her tale be true..."

Act II - The Baron's Court Exhibition. "The Rose Carnival."

- No. 11 - Chorus - "The Exhibition buildings are en fête tonight..."
- No. 12 - Millie and Chorus of Girls - "In a sleepy country hamlet, in the drowsy vale of Kent..."
- No. 13 - Susie and Dudd - "We are orthodox types of an era gone by..."
- No. 14 - Ninette and Duval, with Chorus - "We paid our fares and climbed the stairs..."
- No. 15 - General Sir Wilkie Willoughby, and Chorus - "In good Queen Bess's glorious time..."
- No. 16 - Winnie and Charlie - "When you are by my side a king am I..."
- No. 17 - Charlie - "My heart is yours alone, dear..." (composed under the name of Augustus Barratt but possibly by Leslie Stuart)
- No. 18 - Millie and Gussie - "When you're my little wife..."
- No. 19 - Dudd and Chorus - "If there hadn't been an apple on the tree." (by A. J. Mills and Bennett Scott)
- No. 20 - Ninette and Chorus - "Come with me, if you are melancholic..."
- No. 21 - Finale Act II - "So come along, and join the merry throng..."
- Addendum No. 23 - Millie and Gussie - "I'm glad you take my wooing in this unromantic way..."

== Original West End cast ==
- C. Hayden Coffin – Charlie Chetwynd
- J. F. McArdle – General Sir Wilkie Willoughby
- Lawrence Grossmith – Viscount Gushington ("Gussie")
- Isabel Jay – Winnie Willoughby
- Fred Allandale – M. Duval (Proprietor of the "Maison Duval") -
- Horace Mills – Adolphus Dudd (Office Boy at the "Maison Duval")
- Violet Englefield – Millie Mostyn (Manager of the "Maison Duval")
- Marie Dainton – Ninette (Head of the Millinery Department)
- Coralie Blythe – Susie (Cashier at the "Maison Duval")

== Broadway adaptation ==
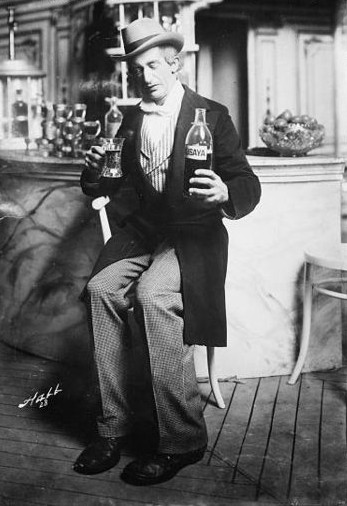
Lew Fields as Henry Schniff.

Lew Fields produced and starred in a Broadway adaptation at the Herald Square Theatre. It ran from 1 October 1907 to 6 June 1908, a total of 282 performances, directed by J. C. Huffman. The production interpolated The Glow-Worm for Winnie Willoughby in Act II.

The opening night cast for the Broadway adaptation included:

- Lew Fields – Henry Schniff, a soldier of misfortune
- Connie Ediss – Mrs. Henry Schniff (formerly Mrs. Willoughby)
- Joseph Ratliff – Charley Chetwynd, a self-made young millionaire
- Denman Maley – Lord Augustine Gushington, familiarly known as "Gussie"
- May Naudain – Winnie Willoughby, Mrs. Schniff's daughter
- George Beban – Henri Duval, manager
- Louise Dresser – Millie Mostyn, overlady at "The Universal"
- Lotta Faust – Ninette Valois, of the millinery department
- Ignacio Martinetti – Dudley Cheatham, cashier

Act I – An American-style department store in London

Henry Schniff, in debt to his landlady for four years' rent, marries her. While on their honeymoon, he learns that he has inherited one million pounds sterling. Now his wife, the former Mrs. Willoughby, insists on mixing in with "society". Her daughter, Winnie Willoughby, does not agree with her mother's choice of a husband for her, the broke and stupid Viscount Augustus Gushington. Instead, Winnie wants to run a flower stall at an American department store in London, "where American methods of handling everything are satirized".

Her first customer is Charlie, recently returned from Africa where he has made his fortune. Romantic sparks fly, but when Winnie loses track of the money in her till, and a £10 note goes missing, she is fired. More trouble: Winnie's father, Sir Wilkie Willoughby, opposes her marriage with Charlie.

Act II – In the "Jardin de Paris" in Hammersmith

At a fancy ball, Winnie works to get her father's approval of her marriage to Charlie. She also proves her innocence: the real thief in the affair of the money is Adolphus Dudd, a shop boy, who took the money to impress his sweetheart at the ball. Winnie's father is caught in a flirtation with Ninette, an employee in the millinery department of the store, and so he cannot refuse Winnie his consent.
