= The Three Kisses =

The Three Kisses is an Edwardian musical comedy in two acts which opened on 21 August 1907 at the Apollo Theatre in London with music by Howard Talbot and a book by Leedham Bantock and Percy Greenbank and lyrics by the latter. Directed by Austen Hurgon for Frank Curzon, despite being "cordially received" by the audience on opening night the piece was a failure.

== Synopsis ==
The musical is set in the Bay of Naples where a legendary curse is attached to the family of Marietta, a Sorrento orange girl. The lovers of the ladies of this family may kiss them only twice before marriage - so, two kisses only were entitled to the engaged couple Marietta and Andrea - a third kiss would draw upon them the most awful curse. The "other woman" is Teresa, who has loved Andrea since before he met Marietta. Witnessing Pimpinello trying to woo Marietta and kissing her, Teresa goads Andrea into proving Marietta's faithfulness by kissing her. Andrea, stung by jealousy, kisses Marietta, and she now having already been kissed twice the curse immediately operates. Vesuvius bursts into flames and Andrea's boat sinks in the Bay and all the parties in the play devise absurd strategies to stop the curse. On hearing that the talisman is in the possession of an eminent English doctor Andrea sets off there to retrieve it. But the doctor himself, Sir Cuthbert Bellamy, or the "Wizard of Wimpole Street" as he calls himself, is already in the neighbourhood with his friend Mr Gobbins as the guests of the Contessa Di Ravogli, who has also taken Marietta into her care until Andrea returns. However, a string of coral about the neck of Marietta has preserved her from the force of the curse.

== Cast ==
Kitty Gordon as Teresa in The Three Kisses

- Walter Passmore - Signor Garibaldi Pimpinello
- Kitty Gordon - Teresa - in love with Andrea
- Coralie Blythe - Ethel Trevor - a honeymooner
- Lionel Mackinder - Harry Trevor - a honeymooner
- Ethel Irving - Contessa Di Ravogli - the English widow of an Italian nobleman
- Charles Angelo - Sir Cuthbert Bellamy
- Walter Hyde - Andrea - a Sorrento fisherman
- Willie Warde - Ghi-Ghi
- Albert le Fre - Mr. Gobbins - friend of Sir Cuthbert
- Caroline Hatchard - Marietta
- William Pringle - Crump
- R. Carr - Roderico
- I. Lewys - Beppo
- C. Hood - Camillo
- M. Moncrieff - Nicolini
- Alice Hatton - Lisetta
- Max Hinton - Elvira
- Edith Streeter - Phillipina
- Millie Collier - Zeuone

== Songs include ==
- The Oranges
- The Star of Sorrento - Marietta
- Woman's Love - Teresa
- The Home-coming - Andrea
- A Neapolitan Boat Song - Andrea
- The Conspirators (Quintet)
- Marietta - Marietta and Andrea
- Nelly Came to Naples - Contessa Di Ravogli
- The Wizard of Wimpole Street - Sir Cuthbert Bellamy
- Love is a Song- Teresa

== Reviews ==
The critic for Truth thought the plot bore

"signs of having suffered from the silly season. It might have been originally founded on the old legend of the right of the seigneur to one complete kiss before matrimony, and this might have been supposed to melt away in the heat of the summer months. But this year we have had no summer, and it would be in vain to dogmatise on the origin of the legend set forth by Messrs Greenbank and Bantock. Two kisses, according to them, were permitted to Marietta and Andrea, that engaged couple. A third kiss would draw down upon them the most awful curse. As you see, stated baldly, this does not sound very clever. But scenic cleverness differs from the others sorts in being concerned with effects of artificial lights and colours confined to the narrow space of the theatre. How slight is the importance which the authors themselves attach to the story in their work may be gathered from the casual way in which the action drifts along, propelled entirely by the exigencies of the actor. For the fatal third kiss is given, and the curse immediately operates. Vesuvius bursts into flames, and there are alarums and excursions of Neapolitan peasantry in pretty frocks. Yet dire as are the forces of Nature, not even a volcano can triumph over a manager. Doubtless he came to Mr Bantock who, pencil and notebook in hand, was dreaming over the ruins of Naples, and addressed him thus: "It's all very well, my dear sir, to have that volcano on in the first act. He does very well, and I know he's played at the Lane. But I can't have any Forces of Nature interfering with the principals. Now look here; we've got Miss Ethel Irving and Miss Kitty Gordon to provide with business, and the public likes the former in comedy too, so pray look sharp and let us have a bright, amusing scene to open the second act with. Not too much of those curses, you know. Merry and bright's the word." So the thoughts that may have been at the back of Messrs Greenbank and Bantock's heads, thoughts of electrifying the world, like Mérimée, with a new Carmen, are hastily painted, the volcanic man is told to control his lava until it is wanted, and Mr Howard Talbot is strictly forbidden to resemble Bizet in his treatment of amoristic themes. This last behest is carefully - not to say punctiliously - obeyed, and Miss Ethel Irving's "Nelly Came to Naples" in no way encroaches on the province of Mme Calvé, nor do any of the other songs or numbers. Yet Miss Irving is a real comedian, at any rate, and when she sees her chance she scores one, just as a crack shot shooting over the ground where there is not much game lets off even less than would have been the case in well-stocked coverts. Nor can Mr Talbot, in his own field, complain of want of appreciation; his songs - "The Oranges" and "The Star of Sorrento" - were well received in the first act, and his treatment of the comic side of things have found hearty recognition in "The Conspirators" quintet. I pass other efforts unmentioned.

The hero and heroine of this circular tale are Mr Lionel Mackinder and Miss Coralie Blythe, for we are informed, before the final fall of the curtain, that a string of corals surrounding the neck of the betrothed young woman had in reality preserved her from the consequences of the third kiss. The pair of them carol and foot it lightly and irresponsibly well throughout the evening, and the fine voice of Miss Kitty Gordon, as the jealous Teresa, linked to her equally fine presence, make an agreeable alternative to their efforts. Mr Walter Hyde must not be forgotten where vocal successes are the question, nor is the comic relief of Mr Walter Passmore nor the artful nonchalances of Mr Willie Warde to be ignored in any play where either appears, any more than Mr Angelo, that doctor of laughter. But I find myself running into a longer list of names than is my usual custom in these impressions of the theatre, longer, perhaps, than the play has such merits, yet the fact remains that the amount of talent engaged by Mr Frank Curzon for this production is considerably greater than usual.

A review in the Daily Mail said of the production:

With the alluring title of The Three Kisses, the first new musical play of the new season started its career at the Apollo Theatre last night. Although the authors, Messrs. Percy Greenbank and Leedham Bantock, have placed their story on the sunny slopes of the Bay of Naples and based it on a legend, they have not gone for their period to the good old times, but have preferred to take today, and with it the English visitors so useful - for contrast - in musical comedy. The plan suits everybody. It suits the comedians, who must be topical; it suits the actresses, who look best in Parisian gowns; and it does not interfere with those who wear the bright costumes of the country.

The environment of The Three Kisses is certainly picturesque, and the composer, Mr. Howard Talbot, has provided a score in harmony with the story and its setting. The legend that serves for the main plot of The Three Kisses is the tale of the curse that comes on the bride who allows her betrothed to kiss her three times before the wedding day. It is an uncomfortable legend for any engaged girl, but in this case there was an antidote if it only could be found, and found, of course, it is.

Plot, however, is rarely a serious factor in musical comedy, and The Three Kisses is not an exception. The best quality in the entertainment is its music, and on that the composer can certainly be congratulated - "The Oranges," "The Home-coming," and "The Star of Sorrento" followed one another almost immediately at the opening of the first act, and if Mr. Talbot, who conducted his own score, had not been insistent each would have been encored at least once.

Miss Kitty Gordon, again, the handsome but jealous character, sang delightfully, and "Woman's Love" is bound to become a very popular number. There is very little fun in the lyrics of the new play, and possibly Mr. Charles Angelo scored best of all the men with "The Wizard of Wimpole Street." With a little time, however, some of the numbers will get a better effect, and with the comic scenes elaborated by Mr. Walter Passmore and Mr. Albert Le Fre there will be more laughter to carry the "business" through. Last night Mr. Willie Warde got more fun into his little scenes than anyone else. His efforts of a gentle-mannered old man to appear a dashing devil may care conspirator set the house in roars. It was droll, and was done with an ease that is rarely seen in musical comedy. Miss Ethel Irving had little to do, but that little was well done. Miss Caroline Hatchard sang well; so too, did Mr. Walter Hyde. Miss Coralie Blythe was successful.
