= Bertram Wallis =

English actor and singer (1874–1952)

Wallis as Alexis in King of Cadonia, 1908

Bertram Wallis (22 February 1874 – 11 April 1952) was an English actor and singer known for his performances in plays, musical comedies and operettas in the early 20th century, first as leading men and then in character roles. He also later appeared in several film roles.

== Early years ==
Wallis was born in London. He was the son of Frederick Augustus Wallis and Sarah Mary (née Williams). A huge man who stood almost seven feet tall, he won the Westmorland Scholarship to study voice at the Royal Academy of Music, where he won the Parepa-Rosa gold medal and the Evill Prize.

After his studies, his first role was Amiens in George Alexander's production of As You Like It in 1896. Edward German composed the music for the production, and Wallis's performance of his songs won praise: "Mr. Bertram Wallis as Amiens sings his solos so well as to quite justify Jacques's remark, 'More, I pr'y thee, more'." Soon afterwards, he played in Much Ado About Nothing, his last production of a Shakespeare play. In the early years of the 20th century, Wallis had his first successes on the musical stage. He sang in a five-man act called "The Musketeers" music hall at the Tivoli Theatre in 1901. In 1902 he appeared in the musical comedy Three Little Maids at the Apollo Theatre, with Lottie Venne, Sybil Grey and Edna May. In 1904 he appeared with Kate Cutler in The Love Birds. He then travelled to New York City to play in several Broadway productions, including A Madcap Princess (1904), Princess Beggar (1907) and Miss Hook of Holland (1907–08), with Christie MacDonald.

After this, Wallis starred in a series of successful London musicals, often with Isabel Jay or José Collins, including King of Cadonia (1908), Dear Little Denmark (1909) and The Balkan Princess (1910). Playgoer magazine commented, "What a ... fine specimen of mankind is the Grand Duke Sergius as played by Mr. Bertram Wallis!" He next starred in The Count of Luxembourg (1911). In 1911, Wallis temporarily left the musical stage to appear in a non-musical melodrama, Beau Brocade at the Globe Theatre, for which he won good notices.

== World War I and later years ==
In 1913, Wallis wrote the libretto for Betty's Little Joke, a musical comedietta in three acts, with music by Cola Robinson. It was staged at the Palladium, with Wallis heading the cast. In the same year, he was in Love and Laughter by Oscar Straus: one reviewer commented, "Mr. Bertram Wallis, a little stouter than he used to be, is the handsome, brave and loving Prince." He returned to musical comedy in The Happy Day (1916), the hit revue Zig Zag! (1917) and A Southern Maid (1920).

In the 1920s, the now mature Wallis began to play character parts, appearing with great success as Louis XV in Madame Pompadour (1923) by Leo Fall, Frederick Lonsdale and Harry Graham, starring with Evelyn Laye and Derek Oldham. He then appeared in Blue Eyes (1928) and So This is Love (1929). He continued to play roles in West End theatres in the 1930s. In 1935 he appeared with W. H. Berry in a revival of Straus's A Waltz Dream. His last West End appearance was in Waltz Without End, produced by Jack Buchanan in 1942.

Between the wars, Wallis also made a number of films, including The Cost of a Kiss (1917), as Lord Darlington; Victory and Peace (1918), as Bob Brierley; The Wandering Jew (1933), as Prince Bohemund; A Dream of Love (1938), as Liszt 'old'; Chips (1938), as Smuggler; A People Eternal (1939), as The English Prince; and Shipbuilders (1944), as Caven Watson.

Wallis died in London at the age of 78.
