= The Balkan Princess =

- Bertram Wallis and Isabel Jay
- Music: Paul Rubens
- Lyrics: Paul Rubens; Arthur Wimperis
- Book: Frederick Lonsdale; Frank Curzon
- Productions: 1910 West End; 1911 Broadway

The Balkan Princess is a musical in three acts by Frederick Lonsdale and Frank Curzon, with lyrics by Paul Rubens and Arthur Wimperis, and music by Paul Rubens. It opened at London's Prince of Wales Theatre on 19 February 1910. The cast included Isabel Jay and Bertram Wallis. There was a successful Broadway run in 1911 that used a libretto by Leonard Liebling, and the show toured widely thereafter.

The piece contains some of Rubens's most tuneful music, and the production was mounted with spectacle in its settings, costumes and large chorus of beautiful girls. The show was much like Lonsdale's previous success King of Cadonia, but with the sexes reversed. Famous songs from the show included "Wonderful World" and "Dear, Delightful Woman".

== Roles and original cast ==
Mabel Sealby as Madga

- The Grand Duke Sergius – Bertram Wallis
- Count Boethy (Prime Minister of Balaria) – William Lugg
- Captain Radomir – Ridgwell Cullum
- Lieutenant Varna – C. Morton Horne
- Max Hein (Alias "Prince Boris of Ma'alia") – Charles Brown
- Blatz (His confederate) – Lauri de Frece
- Lounger at the "Bohemian Restaurant" – Norman Blumé
- Emile (Proprietor of the "Bohemian Restaurant") – Peter Blunt
- Hermann (Commissionaire at the "Bohemian Restaurant") – Barry Neame
- Henri (A waiter) – James Blakeley
- Magda (Charwoman at the palace) – Mabel Sealby
- Olga (Maid of honour) – Hazel Dawn
- Sofia (A habituée of the "Bohemian Restaurant") – Mabel Green
- Paula, Tessa, Carmen, Margherita, Teresa (Other habituées) – Margaret Ismay, Madge Kirkham, Peggy Lorraine, Babs Capelle and Sylvia Beresford
- Cashiers at the "Bohemian Restaurant" – Marjorie Blythe and Alethea Allardyce
- Princess Stephanie of Balaria – Isabel Jay

== Synopsis ==
Setting: Balaria (now Romania)

Princess Stephanie of Balaria is bound by the laws of her country to marry one of six nobles, or abdicate. When the time comes to select her husband she finds that only five have arrived. Count Boethy, the Prime Minister, tells her that Grand Duke Sergius, the missing noble, has refused to enter the palace. That misguided person prefers to write socialistic articles in the press with such headlines as "Why the people of Balaria could dispense with their Princess." The Princess is piqued at these treasonable insults, but admires the Duke's independence. She thinks out a scheme very quickly. She will find him and compel him to come to the Palace.

Hearing that the Duke frequents a certain Bohemian restaurant, she goes there, incognito. Almost the first man she sets eyes on is the Duke, but she doesn't know him. They fall in love with each other. At the end of a happy evening, Sergius proposes a toast, "The downfall of the Princess." The Princess is amazed. "I am the Princess; arrest that man!" Duke Sergius is taken to the Palace as a prisoner. Still, the Princess loves him, and rather than marry one of the remaining nobles she signs the document abdicating the throne of Balaria. Now she is only an ordinary woman, and not bound by the matrimonial laws as a Princess. She is free to marry whom she pleases. Duke Sergius, however, having seen how noble and good she is, destroys the document, takes his stand with the others, and the curtain falls upon the happy couple.

== Musical numbers ==
William Lugg as the Prime Minister

- Overture

ACT I - Reception Room at the Palace

- No. 1 - Chorus of Debutantes and Soldiers - "Here in stately queue, close we press"
- No. 2 - Olga and Chorus - "Now the Court is over and our work is done"
- No. 3 - Chorus - "Way for the Prince, make way, make way!"
- No. 4 - Max Hein and Blatz - "It is sometimes shown that money alone"
- No. 5 - Princess and Chorus of Dukes - "Gentlemen, I thank you for the honour"
- No. 6 - Magda - "When I first made up my mind into service I would go"
- No. 7 - Finale Act I - "Understand that from today I will not be dictated to"

ACT II - The "Bohemian Restaurant," the next evening

- No. 8 - Act II Introduction
- No. 9 - Sofia and Chorus - "In a Balkan village lived a Montenegrin maid"
- No. 10 - Entrance of Grand Duke
- No. 11 - Grand Duke and Chorus - "Women are really most beautiful things"
- No. 12 - Princess and Grand Duke - "We've had a very pleasant chat"
- No. 13 - Magda and Blatz - "Now you must confess I always, more or less"
- No. 14 - Princess - "Wicked old world, you've been slighted for years"
- No. 15 - Henri, Hein, Blatz, Sofia, Magda, and Carmen - "When you're feeling blue"
- No. 16 - Finale Act II

ACT III - The Garden of the Palace, a week later

- No. 17 - Princess - "Last night a lovely dream I dreamed"
- No. 18 - Grand Duke - "There are some men born to be led"
- No. 19 - Henri and Chorus - "People say that the world's all fat"
- No. 20 - Finale Act III (identical to Finale Act II)

Addendum

- Princess - "I have rank, I have treasure, I've a court of my own"
