= The White Chrysanthemum =

English musical by Arthur Anderson and Leedham Bantock

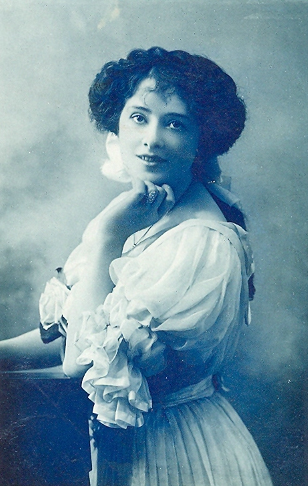
Isabel Jay in the title role

The White Chrysanthemum is an English musical in three acts by Arthur Anderson and Leedham Bantock, with lyrics by Anderson and music by Howard Talbot. First produced at the Tyne Theatre, Newcastle, 23 April 1904, it opened at the Criterion Theatre, produced by Frank Curzon and directed by Austen Hurgon, on 31 August 1905 and ran for 179 performances, closing on 10 February 1906. The Japanese-themed musical starred Isabel Jay, Rutland Barrington, Lawrence Grossmith (a son of George Grossmith), and Henry Lytton. Louie Pounds later joined the cast. The musical enjoyed various international productions including one at the Kings Theatre in Melbourne, Australia in 1917 starring Barry Lupino.

== Synopsis ==
Sybil Cunningham loves Reggie Armitage of the Royal Navy. She has followed him from England to Japan partly to escape an unpleasant engagement in London. They have asked his father's consent to their marriage, and in the meantime, he has arranged for a modest house for her to stay in. His father the admiral, however, has decided that Reggie must marry a wealthy but vivacious American, Cornelia Vanderdecken. Sybil disguises herself as a Japanese girl and hides from Cornelia, and Reggie's friend, Chippy helps her keep up the pretense. But Sybil is distressed to see Reggie with Cornelia and runs away tearfully. Fortunately, Reggie's servant, Sin Chong, and Sybil's cousin, Betty, reveal the true situation to Sybil. In the end, Sybil returns to Reggie, Betty pairs off with Sir Horatio (who will agree to anything she wants), and Chippy lands Cornelia's heart.

== Roles and original cast ==
- Admiral Sir Horatio Armitage, K.C.B. (baritone) - Rutland Barrington
- Lieut. Reginald Armitage (His son) (baritone) - Henry Lytton
- Lieut. Chippendale Belmont (Reggie's friend) - Lawrence Grossmith
- Sin Chong (Reginald's Chinese servant) - M. R. Morand
- Cornelia Vanderdecken (An American heiress) - Marie George
- Betty Kenyon (A young widow, Cousin to Sybil) - Millie Legarde
- Sybil Cunningham (Known as O San, "The White Chrysanthemum") (soprano) - Isabel Jay

== Musical numbers ==
Act I - A Bungalow on the Sea Shore, Japan

- No. 1 - Overture
- No. 2 - Prelude and Song - Sybil - "It was just an old-world village..."
- No. 3 - Duet - Sybil and Betty - "A White Chrysanthemum."
- No. 4 - Song - Reggie - "There's a dear little lady I love..."
- No. 5 - Song - Sybil - "The butterfly and the flower."
- No. 6 - Song - Sin Chong, with Japanese Girls - "Just when-ee day is dawning..."
- No. 7 - Duet - Sybil and Reggie - "When you are my very own..."
- No. 8 - Finale Act I - (during dialogue)

Act II - A Chrysanthemum Garden outside the Bungalow

- No. 9 - Introduction to Act II
- No. 10 - Quintet - Cornelia, Reggie, Chippy, Admiral and Lee - "Hide and Seek."
- No. 11 - Song - Chippy - "I've never been in love before..."
- No. 12 - Duet - Admiral and Betty - "As you have accepted my suggestion..."
- No. 13 - Concerted Number - Sin Chong and Chorus - "Little Japanesee if you wishee pleasee..."
- No. 14 - Song - Cornelia - "The only pebble on the beach."
- No. 15 - Finale Act II

Act III - Reggie's Snuggery in the Bungalow

- Nos. 16 & 17 - Prelude to Act III, and Song - Reggie - "You can't please everybody always..."
- No. 18 - Concerted Number - Sin Chong and Chorus - "When little boys and girls are good..."
- No. 19 - Song - Sybil - "Time was when my love was kind to me..."
- No. 20 - Song - Cornelia - "Down by an old plantation homestead..."
- No. 21 - Duet - Cornelia and Chippy - "Suppose we settle down and take a house in town..."
- No. 22 - Recitation Music (Betty) - "A Hint."
- No. 23 - Song - Admiral - "I've traversed the sea from a far distant shore..."
- No. 24 - Sextet - Sybil, Cornelia, Reggie, Chippy, Admiral and Betty - "We've got to settle the parson..."
