= Fred J. Barnes =

- Born: Frederick Johnson Barnes; 8 January 1873; Southwark, United Kingdom
- Died: 30 December 1917 (aged 44) Off the coast of Alexandria, Egypt
- Genres: Music hall, comic songs
- Occupation: Songwriter
- Years active: c.1906–1915

Frederick Johnson "F.J". Barnes (8 January 1873 – 30 December 1917) was an English songwriter, who co-wrote numerous songs with R. P. Weston and Fred Godfrey.

== Biography ==
Barnes was born in Southwark, Central London. Between about 1906 and 1915, he worked with co-writer R. P. Weston, mainly on songs for the popular music hall performer Billy Williams.

Barnes and Weston co-wrote "Little Willie's Woodbines" (1908); "I've Got Rings On My Fingers" (1909); "When Father Papered the Parlour" (1910); and "Hush Here Comes the Dream Man", recorded in 1911 by Florrie Forde, parodied by First World War soldiers as "Hush Here Comes a Whizzbang", and sung in the Theatre Workshop production of Oh, What a Lovely War! in 1963. Barnes also worked alongside Fred Godfrey on songs such as "Jim’s A Funny Fellow When He’s Had A Few" (c.1911)

Barnes signed up for military service in the First World War, and joined the Essex Regiment. He died on 30 December 1917, from drowning after the torpedo attack on the troop carrier HMT Aragon, off the coast of Alexandria, Egypt. He is buried at the Alexandria War Memorial Cemetery.

== Namesake ==
He is not to be confused with singer Frederick Jester Barnes (1885-1938) who as Fred Barnes, sang "You Can't Fool Around With The Women", composed by Fred Godfrey and Bennett Scott.
