= King of Cadonia =

- Cover of the Vocal Score
- Music: Sidney Jones; Frederick Rosse; Jerome Kern
- Lyrics: Adrian Ross; Arthur Wimperis
- Book: Frederick Lonsdale
- Productions: 1908 West End; 1910 Broadway

King of Cadonia is an English musical in two acts with a book by Frederick Lonsdale, lyrics by Adrian Ross and Arthur Wimperis and music by Sidney Jones and Frederick Rosse. It opened at the Prince of Wales Theatre in London on 3 September 1908, produced by Frank Curzon, and ran for 333 performances. It starred Isabel Jay, Huntley Wright, and Bertram Wallis. There was a brief Broadway production in 1910 with additional music by Jerome Kern at the Fifth Avenue Theatre and directed by Joseph W. Herbert.

This was Lonsdale's first success. Famous songs included "The Wind of Love", "The Portrait" and "Disguises".

== Synopsis ==
Act 1 – The Gardens of the Duke of Alasia

In Cadonia, a mythical country where the king is frequently replaced, the soon-to-be crowned sovereign, Alexis, is tired of the limitations that are placed on his freedom. He learns that there is a conspiracy afoot to assassinate him, and therefore he shaves off his moustache and beard to escape. The disguise is successful. He soon meets Princess Marie, the daughter of the Duke of Alasia, heir presumptive to the Cadonian throne. The princess falls in love with the handsome stranger, and she is pleased to learn that the king has mysteriously disappeared. But her feelings of relief are not shared by her father, the duke, who dreads above all things being called upon to rule over such an unstable country as Cadonia.

Act 2 – The Palace of the King of Cadonia

Alexis, still disguised, infiltrates the murderous conspirators, the chief of whom is posing as head gardener to the duke. He wins the favourable opinion of the conspirators, so that when his true identity is finally revealed, they acknowledge that, at last, Cadonia has been fortunate enough to secure a monarch who may be trusted to rule his people discreetly and bravely. The princess is equally pleased to find that love and duty will now go hand-in-hand and the timid duke is no less delighted at the prospect of avoiding the throne.

== Roles and original cast ==
- The Duke of Alasia, Heir presumptive to the throne – Huntley Wright
- Princess Marie, his daughter – Isabel Jay
- Alexis, King of Cadonia – Bertram Wallis
- General Bonski – Robert Cunningham
- Captain Laski – Pope Stamper
- Lieutenant Jules – Harold Deacon
- Lieutenant Saloff – Cameron Carr
- Panix, Secretary to the Duke of Alasia – Arthur Laceby
- Laborde, Head gardener to the Duke of Alasia – Akerman May
- Bran, Servant to Captain Laski – George Barrett
- Militza, Maid to Princess Marie – Gracie Leigh
- Stephanie, First Lady in Waiting to Princess Marie – Peggy Bethel
- Duchess of Alasia – Amy Martin
- Ladies in Waiting: Natine, Wadna, Ottaline and Fridoline – Queenie Merrall, Gladys Beech, Claire Lynch and Gladys Anderson
- Chorus of soldiers, gardeners, peasants, ladies of the Court, etc.

== Musical numbers ==
Act I

1. As Happy As A King – Laski
2. Not A Little Bit Like You – Militza
3. The Man I Marry – Marie
4. Reasons of State – Marie, Duchess, Duke, Panix
5. Hail! The King – Chorus
6. Overrated – Alexis
7. The Barber – Laski & Chorus of Guards
8. The Lady Of the Castle In the Air – Marie and Alexis
9. Do Not Hesitate To Shoot – Duke
10. The Portrait – Marie, Alexis and Girls

Act II

1. In the Swim – Militza
2. The Wind of Love – Marie
3. There's A King In the Land Today – Alexis
4. Situations – Militza
5. Things That I Know I Could Do – Duke
6. The Woman and the Man – Marie and Alexis
7. Change Partners – Stephanie and Laski
8. Disguises – Militza and Duke
9. Love and Duty – Marie and Alexis
