= When Father Papered the Parlour =

1910 popular song

Single by Billy Williams
- B-side: "Where Does Daddy Go When He Goes Out?"
- Released: 1915
- Recorded: 1910
- Genre: Traditional Pop, Comedy
- Length: 3:08
- Label: Columbia
- Songwriter(s): R. P. Weston, Fred J. Barnes

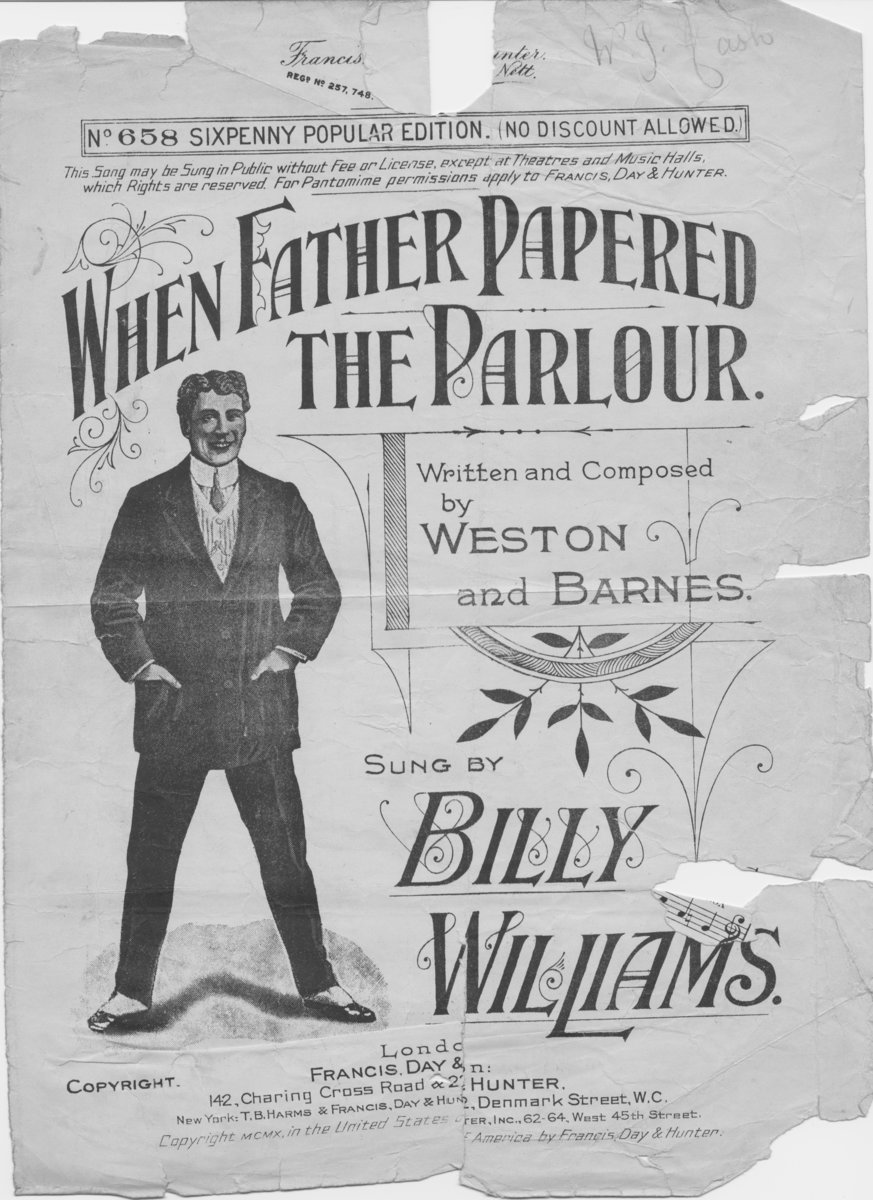
Sheet music cover for performances in England.

When Father Papered the Parlour is a popular song, written and composed by R. P. Weston and Fred J. Barnes in 1910. It was performed by comedian Billy Williams, and was one of his most successful hits.

== In popular culture ==
The song is parodied in the english translation of the comic book Asterix at the Olympic Games : when the Gauls arrive in the Piraeus, they sing « When Father papered the Parthenon. »
