= William Reed (English composer) =

English classical composer and pianist (1910–2002)

- Born: William Leonard Reed; 16 October 1910
- Died: 15 April 2002 (aged 91)
- Education: Dulwich College; Jesus College, Oxford; University of Oxford (DMus)

William Leonard Reed (known as Will Reed) (16 October 1910 – 15 April 2002) was an English classical composer and pianist.

== Life ==
Reed was educated at Dulwich College and Jesus College, Oxford, obtaining a degree in literae humaniores in 1933 and a diploma in education in 1934. Whilst still at Oxford, he won a composition prize for a sonata for violin and piano, and Sir Hugh Allen (professor of music at Oxford) recommended that he should study at the Royal College of Music. Reed studied composition with Herbert Howells and conducting with Constant Lambert. He travelled to Scandinavia on a scholarship in 1936, meeting the Finnish composer Jean Sibelius, and lectured in Scandinavia on behalf of the British Council in 1936 and 1937. In 1939, he obtained a D Mus degree from the University of Oxford.

From his time at Oxford onwards, he was a member of the Oxford Group (which later became Moral Re-Armament), an international moral and spiritual movement. He wrote reviews for the group during the Second World War, and travelled and composed extensively for them between 1940 and 1960. He became director of music at Westminster Theatre Arts Centre in 1966, the group's London venue, and ran a series of successful concerts there. He was a lecturer for the Workers' Educational Association from 1973 to 1997. He died on 15 April 2002.

== Works ==
Penelope Thwaites described Reed's compositional style as "quintessentially English", with inspiration from Howells and John Ireland mixed with "spiky dissonance". His pieces include the following:

- Homage to Delius, for string sextet (1934) – Reed was passionate about the music of Frederick Delius
- Recitative and Dance, Op. 1, for orchestra (1934) – performed with Malcolm Sargent conducting
- Fantasy for flute, viola and harp (1934)
- Scherzo, Op. 16, for orchestra (1937)
- Three Surrey Impressions, Op. 10 for two pianos (1935) – Reed was an accomplished pianist himself
- Piano Trio, Op. 27 (1941–1943) – broadcast by the BBC to mark his 90th birthday
- Doctor Johnson's Suite, Op. 29 for string quartet (1944)
- Concert Suite, Op. 39, for piano (1946–1947)
- Suite "The Top Flat" for viola and piano, Op. 41 (1947)
- The Good Road (1947) – music for a Moral Re-Armament theatre production
- Suite No. 3 (Mountain House), Op. 43a, for orchestra (1949) – performed by the Orchestre de la Suisse Romande – originally written for violin and piano (1949)
- Concert Overture, Op. 44, for orchestra (1943–1950)
- Carol for East and West (1952) – written for Moral Re-Armament
- The Vanishing Island (1955) – music for a Moral Re-Armament theatre production
- The Crowning Experience (1957) – music for a Moral Re-Armament theatre production
- Concert Waltz, Op. 49, for piano (1977)
- Festive March, Op. 34a, for orchestra (1978) – originally written for piano (1945)

Reed also published collections of vocal music, such as The Golden Book of Carols (1948), The Treasury of Vocal Music (1969), and editions of National Anthems of the World (1978 to 2002) with Michael Jamieson Bristow.
