= Arthur Anderson (dramatist) =

English dramatist and lyricist

Arthur Anderson (1873–1942) was an English dramatist and lyricist, who is best known for his libretti for Edwardian musical comedies.

== Biography ==
Anderson was born in London, the son of James H. Anderson and Lydia Warren Townley. He attended the Leys School for Boys in Cambridge. He married Helen Peel Massy (died 1947) in 1908, and they had one child, Aileen Peel Anderson (born 1912).

He collaborated on the libretti for Edwardian musical comedies, including The White Chrysanthemum (1905; with Leedham Bantock; Anderson also wrote the lyrics), The Girl Behind the Counter (1906; with Bantok; Anderson also wrote the lyrics), Two Merry Monarchs (1910; with George Levy; Anderson also wrote the lyrics), Two Little Brides (1912; with Harold R. Atteridge; Anderson also wrote the lyrics) and The Joy-Ride Lady (1914; with Hartley Carrick). He wrote the lyrics for The Nightbirds (1911; adapted from Die Fledermaus; titled The Merry Countess in the 1912 Broadway production), The Marriage Market (1913) and The Beauty Spot (1917). He also contributed lyrics for the Broadway production of Chu Chin Chow (1917) and wrote the lyrics to many popular songs. His musical burlesques included The Bill-Poster (1910, with music by Herman Finck), and his comedy plays included John Berkeley's Ghost (1910 with Hartley Carrick).
