= Frederick Rosse =

English composer

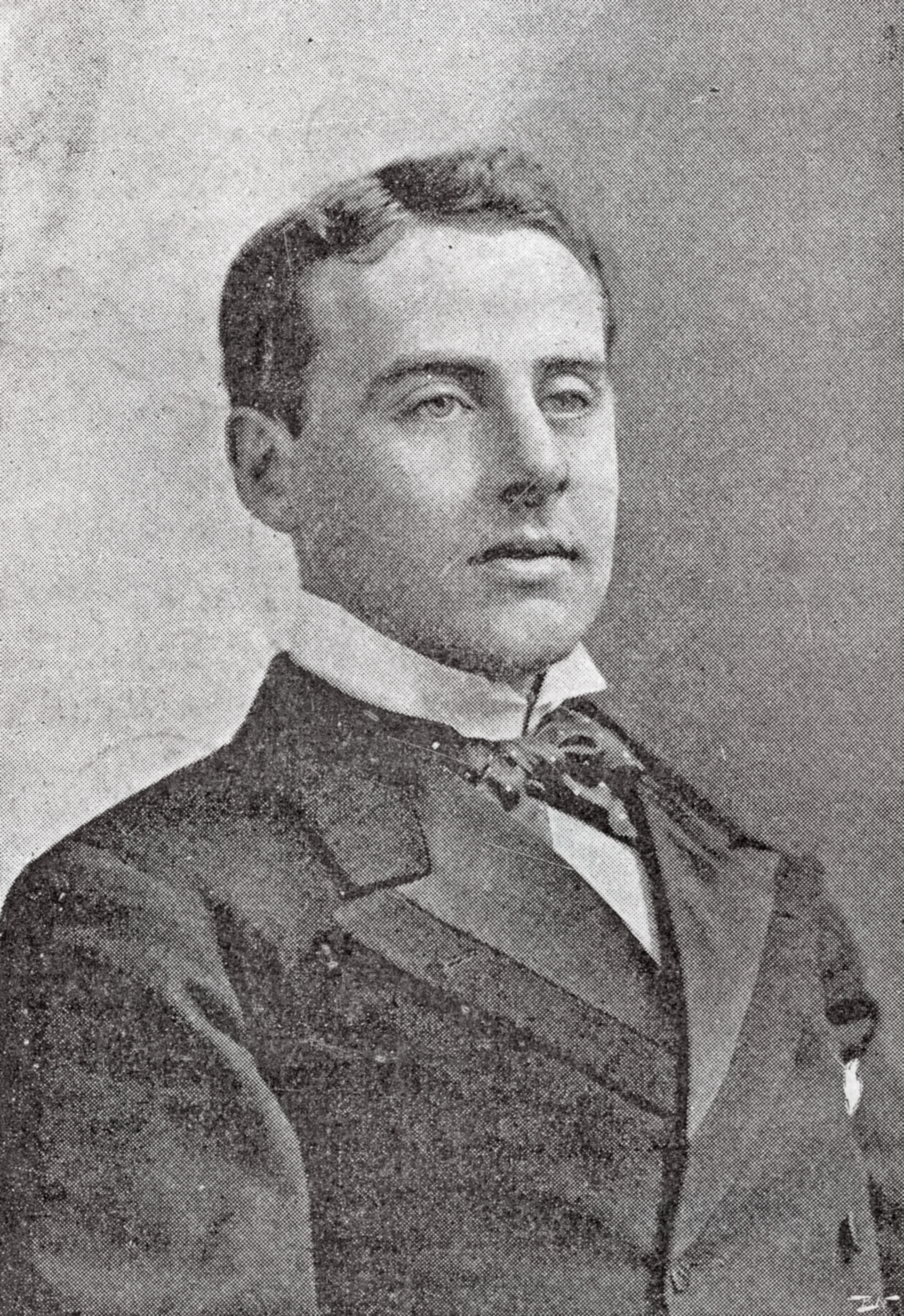
Frederick Rosse in or about 1895

Frederick Rosse (1867 – 20 June 1940) was an English composer of light music and operetta. After studying music in Germany and elsewhere, he began his career as a musical director at London theatres. He composed suites of incidental music for several plays, orchestral suites and songs. His "Doge's March" from his music for The Merchant of Venice was his most enduring piece.

== Early life and career ==
Rosse was born on the Isle of Jersey. He was a godson of the celebrated actress Lillie Langtry, although she was only thirteen years old when she was given this responsibility. Rosse attended Harrow, a private boarding school in London, and studied music at the Conservatoire in Leipzig, Germany, as well as in Dresden, Brussel and Vienna. While in Leipzig, he shared lodgings with composer Frederick Delius.

He began his musical career singing the minor role of Takemine (Sergeant of the Governor's Guard) in the popular musical The Geisha at Daly's Theatre in London. He was eventually promoted to chorus master there and then became a musical director in several other London theaters. He began to compose music by 1895, soon writing suites of incidental music for several stage plays. His "Doge's March" for The Merchant of Venice, produced by Arthur Bourchier at the Garrick Theatre in 1905, was popular for many years. He also wrote orchestral suites that were not meant for the theatre, although some were inspired by plays. One of his most popular songs was "In Passionate Surrender", a setting of words by Henry Hamilton.

Rosse was musical editor for the publishing firm Willocks & Co. By 1920, he was the musical director of the Waldorf Theatre (which later became the Novello Theatre).

== Personal life and death ==
Rosse married Edith Marion, who had been in the cast of a touring company at the theatre, and they lived in a bungalow in Staines, Middlesex. His friend and business manager was Maundy Gregory who often lodged with the couple. Later, the three moved to a house in St. John's Wood called Abbey Lodge. It was later converted into Abbey Road Studios.

He wrote one song each for the musicals Sergeant Brue, with lyrics by P. G. Wodehouse (1905), and King of Cadonia, with lyrics by Arthur Wimperis (1908).

In 1923, he and Edith formally separated. She continued to live in the Abbey Lodge with Gregory, but not in an intimate relationship. On 15 September 1932, Edith died suddenly after refusing Gregory's request for a loan. It is speculated that she was murdered by Gregory, although no charges were ever filed against him.

Rosse died in Brighton on 20 June 1940.

== Selected compositions ==
- "All Aboard" (1895 – published by Chappell)
- Incidental music to an adaptation of The Three Musketeers (1898)
- Incidental music to Monsieur Beaucaire (1902) (Rosse did not write the 1919 operetta of the same name.)
- Incidental music to The Water Babies (1902), by Rutland Barrington, based on Charles Kingsley's The Water-Babies, A Fairy Tale for a Land Baby
- Incidental music to "Almond Eye".
- Incidental music to "The Merchant of Venice" (1905)
- "Petite Suite Moderne" (1908) for orchestra
- "Childhood's Memories"
- "Suite Gabrielle" Op. 101 (1916) for orchestra
- "Suite Dansante," Op.110 (1920) for piano
- "Melodie solennelle in D"
- "Cyrano de Bergerac" (1923) orchestral suite

=== Songs ===
- The Refractory Monk
- Put Me In My Little Cell (1905, written for "Sergeant Brue" to lyrics by P. G. Wodehouse)
- Almond Eye (1923)
- Nobody Seems to Want to Love Me Now
- Still I'd Have Faith
- Oki Dearie Me
- In the Old Countrie

Some of his songs, such as "Put Me In My Little Cell" were included in musicals by other composers.

== Recordings ==
"An Album of Military Band Music," an early stereo recording by The Band of the Grenadier Guards, has been reissued as a digital download. It includes the movements "Portia" and "Doge's March" from Rosse's The Merchant of Venice suite.

Five Movements from The Merchant of Venice suite in a 1921 reduction for violin and piano by Albert Sammons are included on the 2002 CD "Trails of Creativity 1918-1938" featuring violinist David Frühwirth accompanied by pianist Henri Sigfridsson; AVIE CD0009; UPC 8 22252 0009 2 4. The "Doge's March" movement from the same suite in its orchestral form can be heard performed by The New London Orchestra conducted by Ronald Corp on a Hyperion Records CD (British Light Music Classics 4) from 2002. His music had some representation on acetate and LP, including an appearance in a Folkways Records compilation of "The theatre lyrics of P. G. Wodehouse" released in 1961.
