= Isabel Jay =

English opera singer and actress (1879–1927)

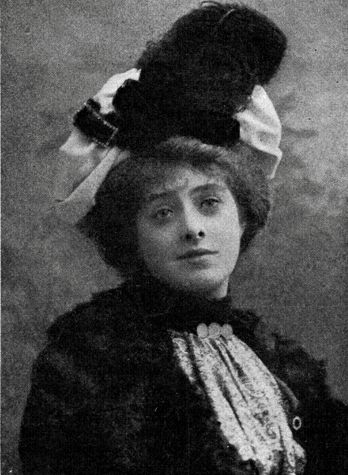
1901 publicity photo for The Emerald Isle

Isabel Emily Jay (17 October 1879 – 26 February 1927) was an English opera singer and actress, best known for her performances in soprano roles of the Savoy Operas with the D'Oyly Carte Opera Company and in Edwardian musical comedies. During Jay's career, picture postcards were immensely popular, and Jay was photographed for over 400 different postcards.

After studying at the Royal Academy of Music, Jay joined the D'Oyly Carte Opera Company in 1897, with whom she began singing principal roles immediately, becoming the company's leading soprano in 1899, where she played leading roles in comic operas including The Rose of Persia, The Pirates of Penzance, Patience, The Emerald Isle and Iolanthe. She married and left the company in 1902. She returned to the West End stage in 1903 and starred in eleven musicals over the ensuing years, including A Country Girl, The Cingalee, Véronique, The White Chrysanthemum, The Girl Behind the Counter, Miss Hook of Holland, King of Cadonia and The Balkan Princess. She retired in 1911 at age 31.

== Life and career ==
=== Early life and D'Oyly Carte years ===
Jay was born in Wandsworth, London, the youngest child of John Wimburn Jay, an insurance officer, and his wife Isabelle Clara (Wicks). She was the great-granddaughter of John George Henry Jay (1770–1849), a musician and composer connected with the Royal Academy of Music. She began to sing in public at the age of twelve. She entered the Royal Academy of Music in 1895, where she studied piano and voice. In 1897, she was the first winner of the Gilbert R. Betjemann gold medal for operatic singing. While still at the Academy, she drew the attention of Helen Carte.

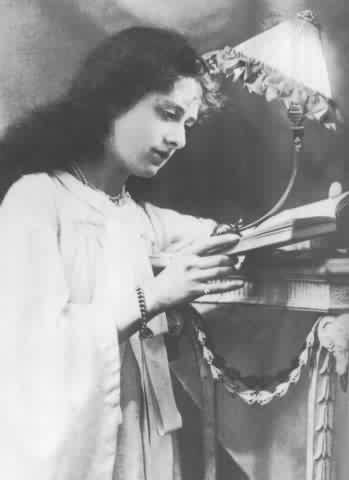
As Mabel in Pirates

On leaving the Academy, in 1897, she joined the D'Oyly Carte Opera Company with a week-long trial at the Savoy Theatre, singing the part of Elsie Maynard in the first London revival of The Yeomen of the Guard. She immediately became principal soprano in a D'Oyly Carte touring company, playing the roles of Elsie, Phyllis in Iolanthe, Yum-Yum in The Mikado, Princess Lucilla Chloris in His Majesty, and later adding the roles of Aline in The Sorcerer, and Mabel in The Pirates of Penzance. A reviewer for The Era wrote of her Mabel: "Miss Isabel Jay's bright, alert acting and fascinating personality would have condoned many deficiencies. But in addition to winning all hearts by her freshness and earnestness, Miss Jay gave us a delightfully easy and accomplished rendering of her share of the score, and the way in which she used a very valuable voice told of sound training and keen intelligence."

Jay rejoined the main D'Oyly Carte company at the Savoy in 1898, briefly playing Gianetta and then Casilda in The Gondoliers, and soon took over the role of The Plaintiff in Trial by Jury, winning a favourable review in The Sunday Times. In early 1899, she created the small role of Aloës in The Lucky Star, and she then filled in for Ruth Vincent for 21 performances as Josephine in H.M.S. Pinafore, as well as performing again as The Plaintiff.

=== Principal soprano ===
Late in 1899, Vincent left the D'Oyly Carte Opera Company, turning down the secondary role in The Rose of Persia when she was passed over to sing the lead, Sultana Zubeydah, which was given to Ellen Beach Yaw. Jay was initially given the small role of Blush-of-Morning. Less than two weeks later, when Yaw was dismissed, Jay was promoted to the demanding lead role and received favourable notices as the Sultana.

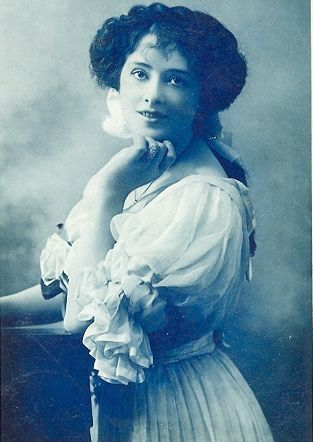
In The White Chrysanthemum

Now the company's leading soprano, Jay played Mabel in Pirates (1900), again earning good notices, and the title role in the first London revival of Patience (1901). During the run, she was made an Associate of the Royal Academy of Music. She then created the roles of Lady Rose Pippin in The Emerald Isle (1901) and the Gipsy Woman in Ib and Little Christina (1901). She played Phyllis in the first London revival of Iolanthe (1901–1902). She left the company in 1902 to marry the African explorer Henry Shepherd Cavendish, who was later the 6th Baron Waterpark.

=== West End career ===
After the birth of her first daughter, Celia Mitchell Anderson (1903–1997), Jay returned to the stage, taking over the role of Marjory Joy in a hit production of A Country Girl. She then starred in one West End theatre production after another – eleven in all – over a period of seven-and-a-half years. The first was the hit musical The Cingalee (1904, with Rutland Barrington and Hayden Coffin), in which she created the role of Lady Patricia Vane. In 1905 she was invited to sing before King Edward VII and Queen Alexandra at Chatsworth House, where the Queen presented her with a brooch. She was also a replacement for a pregnant Ruth Vincent in the title role of Véronique.

Later that year she was hired by Frank Curzon, a successful theatre manager, who became her mentor. Her first role with Curzon was Sybil Cunningham in The White Chrysanthemum at the Criterion in 1905 (starring with Rutland Barrington and Henry Lytton) and then on tour. In early 1906, Jay separated from her husband. Her next role was Winnie Willoughby in The Girl Behind the Counter (1906, with Hayden Coffin). For the next four years, she starred regularly in Curzon's West End productions, often at The Prince of Wales Theatre and often in a show written by Paul Rubens. These were intended to be spectacular shows, with exotic sets, elaborate costumes and beautiful chorus girls. Her roles during these years included Olivia in Liza Lehmann's The Vicar of Wakefield (1906, based on the novel of the same name), Sally in Miss Hook of Holland (1906, running for a very successful 462 performances), Paulette in My Mimosa Maid (1908), Princess Marie in King of Cadonia (1908), Christina in Dear Little Denmark (1909), and Princess Stephanie in The Balkan Princess (1910).

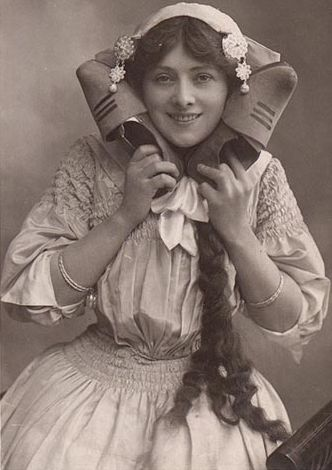
In Miss Hook of Holland

Jay and Curzon married on 28 July 1910. After the end of the run of The Balkan Princess in 1911, Jay retired from the stage at only 31 years of age, and she had a second child, Pamela Stephanie Curzon, in 1915. In 1923 in her only return to the stage, Jay created the role of Anne West, with Curzon as suitor James Hathaway and daughter Celia in her stage debut as Angela West, in a play of Jay's own authorship, The Inevitable. The play toured Hastings, Eastbourne, Littlehampton and Brighton, before opening for a short run at the St. James Theatre. During her career, more than 400 different postcards with Jay's image were issued.

=== Early death ===
Jay's health began to deteriorate due to the effects of scarlet fever as a child, and she died at age 47 in Monte Carlo, having been on a cruise with her husband. In recognition of her achievements, the Royal Academy of Music two years later instituted the Isabel Jay Memorial Prize.

== Recordings ==
Jay made 19 recordings between 1900 and 1906, mostly of pieces from her early musical comedies. She also recorded "Poor Wand'ring One" from Pirates in 1900 and twice more in 1904. One of the latter recordings is heard on the Pearl recording "The Art of the Savoyard."
