= Billy Williams (music hall performer) =

Australian music hall entertainer (1878–1915)

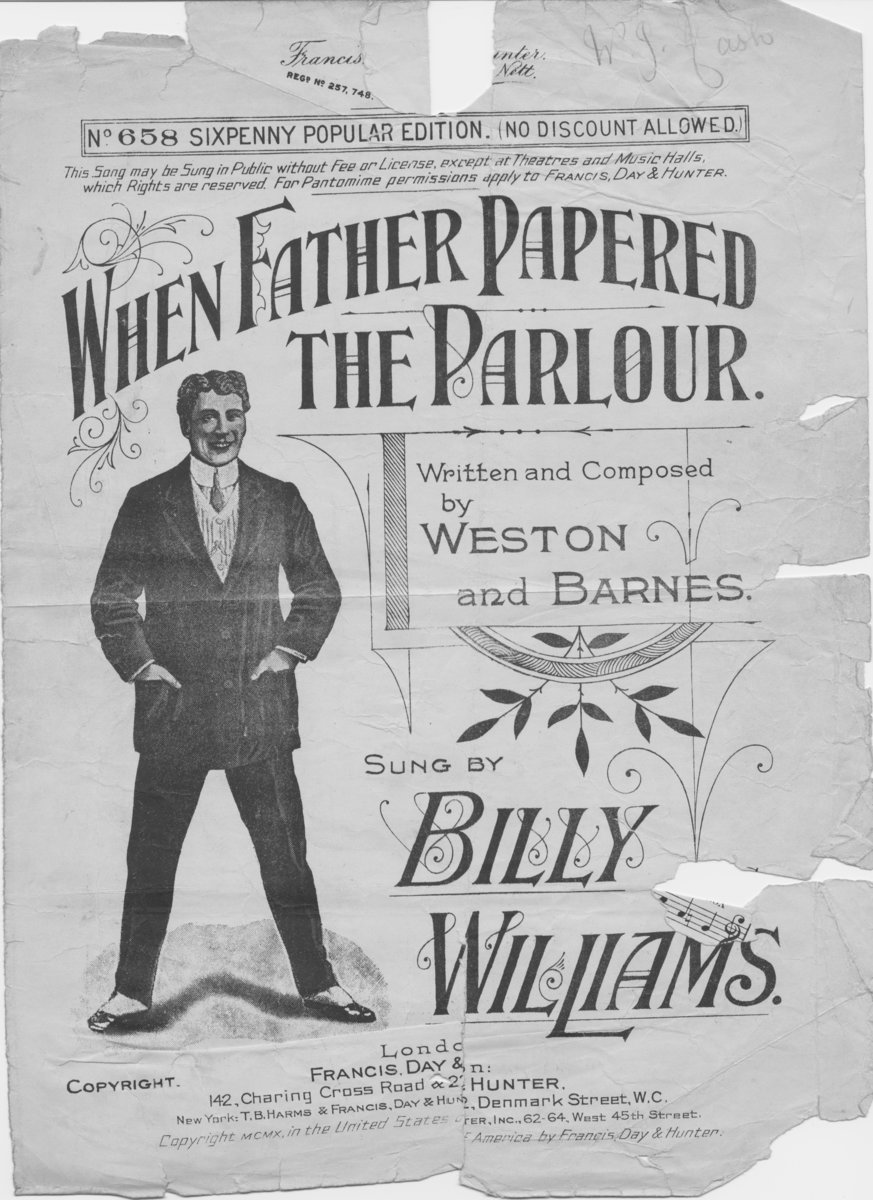
- 1910 sheet music cover
- Born: Richard Isaac Banks; 3 March 1878; Melbourne, Victoria, Australia
- Died: 13 March 1915 (aged 37); Shoreham-by-Sea, Sussex, England
- Other names: William Holt Williams
- Occupation: Singer
- Years active: 1895–1914

William Holt Williams (born Richard Isaac Banks; 3 March 1878 – 13 March 1915) was an Australian-born British vaudeville and music hall singer and entertainer. His best known song was "When Father Papered the Parlour".

== Biography ==
Born in Melbourne, the son of Richard Banks, an Irish-born draper, Williams worked in a racing stable and as a golf instructor before joining a small touring variety company in 1895. Back in Melbourne he was heard by the entertainer Tom Woottwell, and met Harry Rickards who gave him a letter of introduction to contacts in England.

He arrived in England in late 1899, and made his London debut the following March, as Will Williams. He started appearing in a velvet suit, usually blue in colour, which distinguished him from other performers and led to his description as "The Man in the Velvet Suit". He became a popular entertainer in the music halls singing what were known as chorus-songs. His best-known songs included "Let's All Go Mad", "John, John, Go and Put Your Trousers On", and "When Father Papered the Parlour". Encouraged by his Melbourne-born contemporary Florrie Forde, he made his first recordings in 1906, and over the next eight years recorded prolifically on cylinder and disc. He was one of the first recording stars whose records sold in their thousands. His version of "When Father Papered the Parlour", written by R. P. Weston and Fred J. Barnes, was issued by at least thirty different record labels. His song "Save a Little One for Me" was recorded as a Phonoscène. He also appeared in pantomime.

In 1910, he returned for an extended tour to his native Australia where he was greeted with wild enthusiasm. Returning to England later in that year, he continued his business relationship with songwriter Fred Godfrey. The two had, what might be described as a "song factory", and worked in partnership (although it is believed that Godfrey did all of the song writing). The year 1912 seemed to be the zenith of Williams' career – he appeared in the first Royal Command Performance of that year and achieved glowing reviews in the national press.

He became ill in late 1914, and died at the age of 37 at Shoreham-by-Sea near Brighton in March 1915, the proximate cause being septic prostatitis and consequent complications after an operation for that condition, but rumoured ultimately to be connected with "previous social excesses," an Edwardian euphemism for syphilis. He was buried in Mill Lane Cemetery, Shoreham-by-Sea. His headstone is in a family plot.

== Personal life ==
Williams married Amy Robinson in 1901; she survived her husband by some 61 years. They had four living children: Reginald, William, Margaret and Cathleen, who after his death, moved with Amy to Australia. He was the brother of Richard and Rowley Banks, two of Australia's earliest professional golfers, who were foundation members of the Australian Professional Golfers Association in 1911.
