= Prince of Wales Theatre =

West End theatre in London

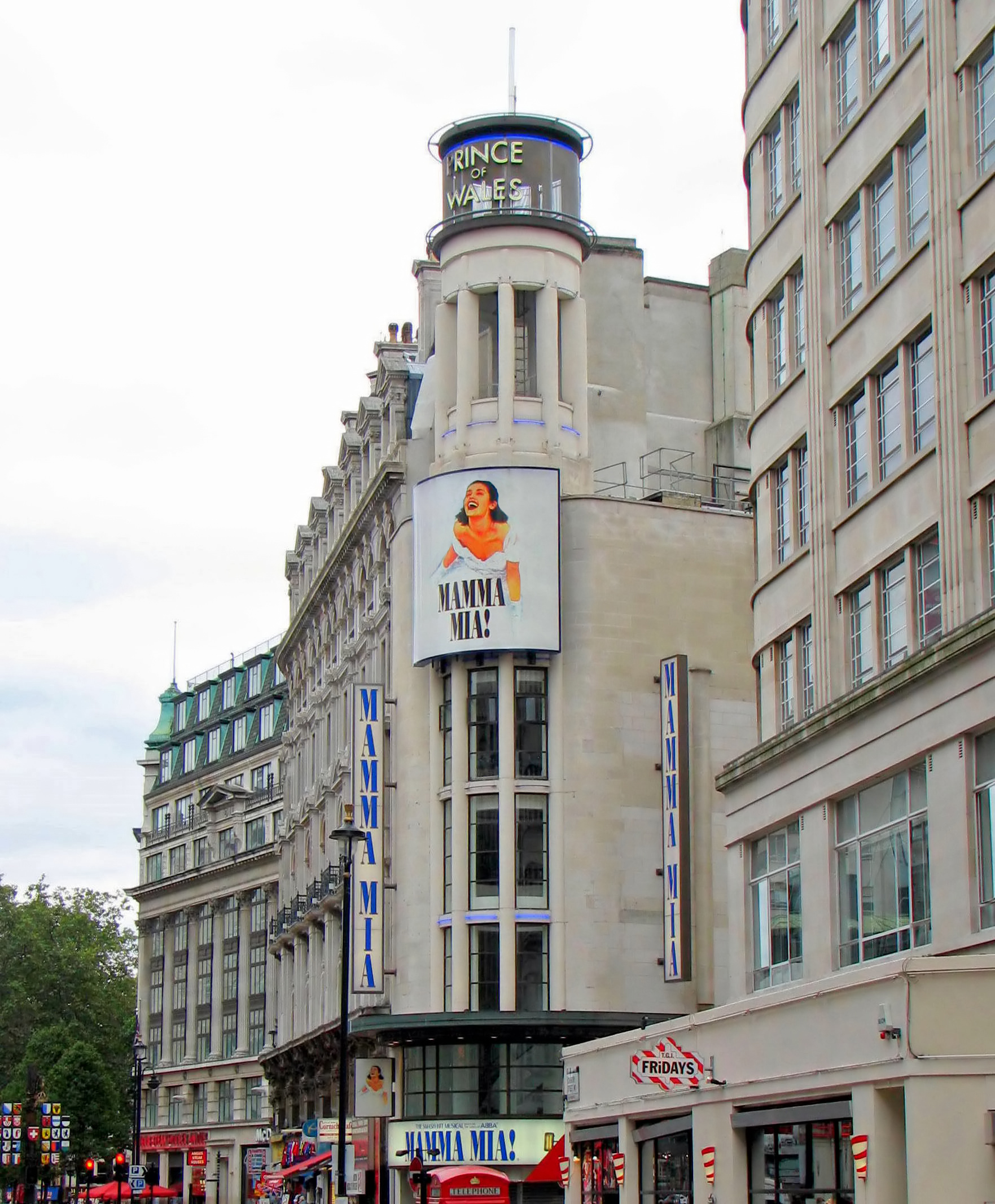
- Prince of Wales Theatre showing Mamma Mia!
- Interactive map of Prince of Wales Theatre
- Address: Coventry Street; London, W1; United Kingdom
- Coordinates: 51°30′36.8″N 0°7′55.5″W
- Owner: Delfont Mackintosh Theatres
- Capacity: 1,148 on 2 levels
- Type: West End theatre
- Designation: Grade II
- Production: The Book of Mormon
- Public transit: Piccadilly Circus

Construction
- Opened: January 1884; 142 years ago
- Rebuilt: 1937 (Robert Cromie)

Listed Building – Grade II
- Official name: Prince of Wales Theatre
- Designated: 15 April 1999
- Reference no.: 1386535
- Architect: C. J. Phipps

Website
- Prince of Wales Theatre website at Delfont Mackintosh Theatres

The Prince of Wales Theatre is a West End theatre in Coventry Street, near Leicester Square in London. It was established in 1884 and rebuilt in 1937, and extensively refurbished in 2004 by Sir Cameron Mackintosh, its current owner. The theatre should not be confused with the former Scala Theatre in London that was known as the Prince of Wales Royal Theatre or Prince of Wales's Theatre from 1865 until its demolition in 1903.

== History ==
=== Phipps's theatre ===
The first theatre on the site opened in January 1884 when C.J. Phipps built the Prince's Theatre for actor-manager Edgar Bruce. It was a traditional three-tier theatre, seating just over 1,000 people. The theatre was renamed the Prince of Wales Theatre in 1886 after the future Edward VII. Located between Piccadilly Circus and Leicester Square, the theatre was favourably situated to attract theatregoers.

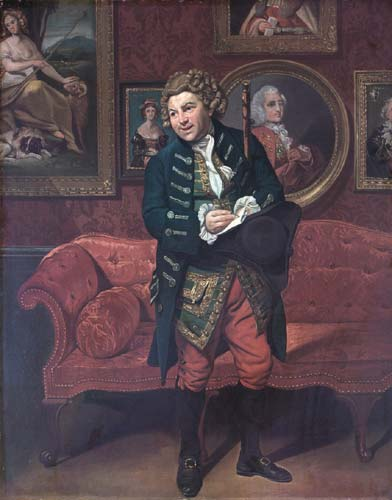
The School for Scandal

The first production in the theatre was an 1884 revival of W. S. Gilbert's The Palace of Truth starring Herbert Beerbohm Tree, preceded by a one-act comedy, In Honour Bound. This was soon followed by a free adaptation of Ibsen's A Doll's House, called Breaking a Butterfly. In 1885, Lillie Langtry, reputedly the first "society" lady to become an actress, played in Princess George and The School for Scandal. The first hit production at the theatre was the record-breaking comic opera, Dorothy, starring Marie Tempest, which was so successful that its authors used the profits to build the Lyric Theatre, where it moved in 1888. The wordless mime play L'Enfant Prodigue premiered in 1891 which, together with A Pierrot's Life in 1897, brought respectability to mime troupes in Britain. On 23 December 1886, Henry Savile Clarke and Walter Slaughter's musical Alice in Wonderland (the first major production of the Alice books) debuted at the theatre, with Phoebe Carlo in the title role. Lewis Carroll attended a performance seven days later.

George Edwardes' musical play, In Town, often considered the first English musical comedy, was presented at the theatre in 1892 and was followed by Edwardes's even more successful A Gaiety Girl in 1893. In 1895, Basil Hood's Gentleman Joe, the Hansom Cabby began a long run starring the low comedian, Arthur Roberts, in the title role. The theatre then began to present straight plays with Maeterlinck's Pelléas et Mélisande (1898, with incidental music by Fauré) and Wills's adaptation of Dickens' A Tale of Two Cities as The Only Way (1899, also starring Harvey). Charles Hawtrey starred in the successful A Message from Mars (1901). In 1900–01, Marie Tempest played the title roles in the play English Nell (based on Simon Dale's novel about Nell Gwynn), Peg Woffington, a dramatisation of Charles Reade's novel, as well as Becky Sharp in a dramatisation of Thackeray's Vanity Fair.

Cover of the Vocal Score of Sidney Jones' King of Cadonia

The theatre played more musical comedies beginning in 1903, including the Frank Curzon and Isabel Jay hits Miss Hook of Holland (1907, its matinee version, Little Miss Hook of Holland was performed by children for children), King of Cadonia (1908), and The Balkan Princess (1910), and later the World War I hits, Broadway Jones (1914), Carminetta (1917), and Yes, Uncle! (1917).

The theatre then hosted plays such as Avery Hopwood's farce Fair and Warmer (1918) and Ivor Novello's The Rat (1924, Novello's first play, in which he also starred), and revues including A to Z (1921), Co-Optimists (1923), and Charlot's Revue (1924). They starred Gertrude Lawrence, Jack Buchanan, Beatrice Lillie, Stanley Holloway, and Jessie Matthews. Matthews also starred, along with Richard Hearne, in "Wild Rose", featuring the Jerome Kern song "Look for the Silver Lining". These were followed by The Blue Train (1927), Alibi (1928, directed by Gerald du Maurier with Charles Laughton as Hercule Poirot), By Candlelight (1928), and Journey's End (1929). In 1930, Edith Evans became the manager at the theatre, presenting and starring in Delilah, which was not a success. Beginning in 1932, the theatre presented a series of risqué "Folies"-style revues, including Voila! Les Dames (1935) and its last production, Encore les Dames (1937). These shows were so successful that they funded the rapid rebuilding of the theatre in 1937.

=== Cromie's theatre ===
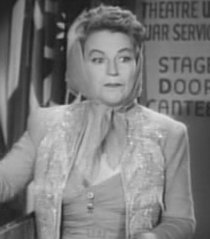
Gracie Fields

After 50 years, the theatre's 800 seats were deemed insufficient for productions of the day, and it was demolished. On 17 June 1937, Gracie Fields sang to the workmen as she laid the foundation stone of the new Art Deco-decorated theatre, designed by Robert Cromie, and the theatre opened on 27 October that year. The new theatre's seating capacity was about 1,100, and it had a larger stage and improved facilities for both the artists and the public, including a large, stylish stalls bar (the bar itself was 14 metres long), complete with dance floor. The first productions at the new theatre were Les Folies de Paris et Londres, starring George Robey, followed by Folies De Can-Can in 1938, a continuation of the old theatre's series of successful risqué revues, which ran continuously until 2 am every night. The musical comedy, Present Arms, was offered in 1940, and in 1941 the theatre screened the UK premiere of Charlie Chaplin's The Great Dictator. The film had been banned in many parts of Europe, and the theatre's owner, Alfred Esdaile, was fined for showing it.

In 1943, Strike a New Note was notable for Sid Field's London debut, and he returned to the theatre in Strike it Again (1944), and yet again in Piccadilly Hayride (1946, a revue that ran for 778 performances). In 1949, Harvey, Mary Coyle Chase's comedy about an imaginary rabbit, was a success, as was Diamond Lil in 1948 starring Mae West. In the 1950s, the theatre hosted variety and revues, starring such famous performers as Norman Wisdom, Peter Sellers, Bob Hope, Gracie Fields, Benny Hill, Hughie Green, Frankie Howerd, and Morecambe and Wise.

In 1958, Bernard Delfont and Michael Dorfman took over the lease of the theatre from Moss Empires. In 1959, Paul Osborn's The World of Susie Wong became the theatre's longest-running play to date with 832 performances. On 4 November 1963, The Beatles performed From Me to You, She Loves You, Till There Was You, and Twist and Shout at the Prince of Wales Theatre, during the Royal Variety Show in the presence of The Queen Mother and her younger daughter.

Neil Simon's play, Come Blow Your Horn, starring Michael Crawford, played in 1962, followed by a season of Martha Graham's dance company, including the world première of her ballet Circe. Next was a string of Broadway musicals, including Funny Girl in 1966 with Barbra Streisand, Sweet Charity (1967), and Promises, Promises (1969). The Threepenny Opera was revived in 1972. In 1976, Bernard Slade's Same Time, Next Year was a hit, as was I Love My Wife (1977), and Bedroom Farce (1978). In 1982, Underneath the Arches was a long-running hit. Andrew Lloyd Webber's Aspects of Love (1989) smashed all previous box-office records at the theatre, running for 1,325 performances. More recent productions are listed below.

Refurbishment was carried out in 2004 to increase the seating capacity slightly to 1,160 seats and to modernise the theatre's facilities. New bars were added, the auditorium completely rebuilt, the backstage areas refurbished and the theatre's famous tower and exterior completely gutted and refurbished with new LED lighting and a crisp modern finish.

The theatre re-opened with ABBA's musical Mamma Mia! on 16 April 2004. On 18 August 2007, Mamma Mia! became the longest-running show at the time at the Prince of Wales, overtaking the previous record held by Aspects of Love with 1,326 performances. The production marked another landmark on Thursday 23 August 2007, celebrating its 3,500th performance since its 1999 world premiere at the Prince Edward Theatre in Old Compton Street, London. The production left the theatre on 1 September 2012 and transferred to the Novello Theatre on 6 September 2012.

After a short run of Let it Be, before it transferred to the Savoy for a short run, the theatre is now home to The Book of Mormon which has become the theatre's longest running musical.

Due to the COVID-19 pandemic, The Book of Mormon was forced to close in March 2020. On 2 August 2021, the theatre re-opened with The Windsors: Endgame based on the Channel 4 sitcom The Windsors. Due to The Book of Mormon reopening on 15 November 2021, The Windsors played its final performance on 9 October 2021.

On 6 June 2024 The Book of Mormon celebrated its 4,000th performance at the theatre.

The theatre was grade II listed by English Heritage in April 1999.

On the 31st March 2026 a performance of the Book of Mormon was halted, and subsequently cancelled, after a spiritual protester in the front row pulled on a green balaclava, and threw paint on stage. After being removed from the theatre by a usher, staff came on stage to announce the show would not continue and offered the audience the opportunity to rebook or a receive a full refund.

== Notable productions ==
- The Rat (9 May – 13 September 1924)
- A Caribbean Rhapsody (6 May – 1948)
- It's Magic (10 December 1980 – 6 February 1982)
- South Pacific (20 January 1988 – 14 January 1989)
- Aspects of Love (17 April 1989 – 20 June 1992)
- Annie Get Your Gun (November–December 1992)
- Copacabana (23 June 1994 – 9 September 1996)
- Smokey Joe's Cafe (23 October 1996 – 3 October 1998)
- West Side Story (January–December 1999)
- Rent (December 1999 – January 2000)
- Fosse (8 February 2000 – 6 January 2001)
- The Witches of Eastwick (23 March – 27 October 2001)
- The Full Monty (March–October 2002)
- Rent (October 2002 – March 2003)
- Cliff – The Musical (March–June 2003)
- Mamma Mia! (9 June 2004 – 1 September 2012) – moved to Novello Theatre
- Let It Be (14 September 2012 – 19 January 2013) – moved to Savoy Theatre
- The Book of Mormon (25 February 2013 – 16 March 2020, reopened 15 November 2021)
- The Windsors: Endgame (2 August – 9 October 2021)

== Nearby tube stations ==
- Leicester Square tube station
- Piccadilly Circus tube station
