= Adrian Ross =

English lyricist (1859–1933)

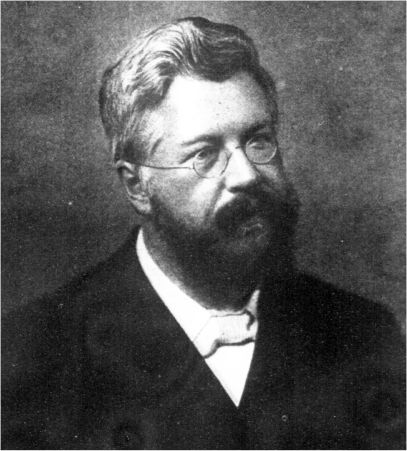
Ross in 1904

Arthur Reed Ropes (23 December 1859 – 11 September 1933), better known under the pseudonym Adrian Ross, was a prolific English writer of lyrics, contributing songs to more than sixty British musical comedies in the late 19th and early 20th centuries. He was the most important lyricist of the British stage during a career that spanned five decades. At a time when few shows had long runs, nineteen of his West End shows ran for over 400 performances.

Starting out in the late 1880s, Ross wrote the lyrics for the earliest British musical theatre hits, including In Town (1892), The Shop Girl (1894) and The Circus Girl (1896). Ross next wrote the lyrics for a string of hit musicals, beginning with A Greek Slave (1898), San Toy (1899), The Messenger Boy (1900) and The Toreador (1901) and continuing without a break through World War I. He also wrote the English lyrics for a series of hit adaptations of European operettas beginning with The Merry Widow in 1907.

During World War I, Ross was one of the founders of the Performing Rights Society. He continued writing until 1930, producing several more successes after the war. He also wrote the popular novel The Hole of the Pit and a number of short stories.

== Life and career ==
Ross was born in Lewisham, London. He was the youngest son and fourth child of Ellen Harriet Ropes née Hall, of Scarborough, and William Hooper Ropes, a Russian merchant. Ross's parents lived in Normandy, France, but sent him to school in London at Priory House School in Clapton, Mill Hill School, and the City of London School. He later attended King's College, Cambridge, where, in 1881, he won the Chancellor's Medal for English verse for his poem "Temple Bar", and also won the Members' Prize for the English essay. In 1883 he graduated with a first-class degree, winning the Lightfoot scholarship for history and a Whewell scholarship for international law. He was elected a fellow of the College.

He was a Cambridge University graduate and don, teaching history and poetry from 1884 to 1890 and writing serious and comic verse of his own, the first volume of which was published in 1884. In 1889, he published "A Sketch of the History of Europe". He was also a translator of French and German literature under his own name. He created the fictitious name "Adrian Ross" due to a concern that writing musicals would compromise his academic career.

=== Early career ===
A. C. Seymour and Letty Lind in Morocco Bound

During a brief illness in 1883 after catching cold at the University Boat Race, Ross used the lonely time in bed to write the libretto of an entertainment entitled A Double Event. This was produced at St. George's Hall, London in 1884 with music by Arthur Law, and Ross used the name "Arthur Reed". His next work for the stage, also as Arthur Reed, was the book and lyrics for a musical burlesque, Faddimir (1889 at the Opera Comique), with music by fellow Cambridge graduate, F. Osmond Carr.

The piece earned enough praise so that the impresario George Edwardes commissioned the two to write another burlesque, together with the comic actor John Lloyd Shine, called Joan of Arc. Songs from the piece included "I Went to Find Emin", "Round the Town", and "Jack the Dandy-O". Joan of Arc opened in 1891 at the Opera Comique starring Arthur Roberts and Marion Hood; he wrote under the pseudonym Adrian Ross, which he used for the rest of his career. The piece was a hit, lasting for almost eight hundred performances, and Ross resigned from Cambridge. To supplement his income from theatre writing, Ross became a contributor to such journals as Punch, Sketch, Sphere and The World, and he joined the staff of Ariel in 1891–1892. He wrote in The Tatler under the pseudonym Bran Pie and in 1893 published an edition of Lady Mary Wortley Montague's Letters. He also published numerous French texts for the Pitt Press series.

Ross and Carr's next work, in collaboration with James T. Tanner, was In Town (1892), a smart, contemporary tale of backstage and society goings-on. This left behind the earlier Gaiety burlesques and helped set the new fashion for the series of modern-dress Gaiety Theatre shows that quickly spread to other theatres and dominated British musical theatre. For his next piece, Morocco Bound (1893, with the song "Marguerite from Monte Carlo"), Ross concentrated on writing lyrics, leaving the "book" mostly to Arthur Branscombe. This proved to be his most successful model through most of his career. The position of "lyricist" was relatively new, as previously the writers of libretti would invariably write the lyrics themselves. As the new Edwardes-produced "musical comedies" took the place of burlesque, comic opera and operetta on the stage, Ross and Harry Greenbank established the usefulness of a separate lyricist.

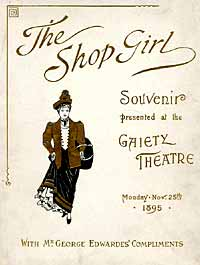
Souvenir – 1st anniversary of the opening

=== Gaiety and Daly Theatre musicals ===
Ross contributed lyrics to almost all of the Gaiety Theatre's shows, beginning with The Shop Girl (1894, with his song "Brown of Colorado") and Go-Bang in 1895. He wrote over two thousand lyrics and produced lyrics for over sixty musicals thereafter, including most of the hit musicals through World War I. In 1896, he contributed to the Gaiety Theatre hit, The Circus Girl. He also wrote lyrics for the one-act comic opera, Weather or No (1896), which played as a companion piece to The Mikado at the Savoy Theatre, as well as several other Savoy operas, such as Mirette (1894), His Majesty, or The Court of Vignolia (1897), The Grand Duchess of Gerolstein (1897) and The Lucky Star (1899).

Lily Elsie in The Dollar Princess

Ross also wrote lyrics for the shows at Daly's Theatre. His lyrics to additional numbers for An Artist's Model (1895) and The Geisha (1896) were successful enough so that Edwardes asked him for major contributions to the rest, beginning with A Greek Slave (1898), especially after the death of the theatre's early chief lyricist, Harry Greenbank. These included a series of enormous successes, including San Toy (1899), The Messenger Boy (1900), Kitty Grey (1901), The Toreador (1901), A Country Girl (1902), The Girl from Kays (1903), The Orchid (1903), The Cingalee (1904), The Spring Chicken (1905) and The Girls of Gottenberg (1907). In 1901, Ross married Ethel Wood, an actress, and the couple produced a son and two daughters. The family resided in Church Street, Kensington. Also in 1901, he collaborated with his sister Mary Emily Ropes on the children's story, On Peter's Island.

When Edwardes found success, beginning in 1907, in mounting English-language versions of the new generation of continental European operettas to the London stage, Ross wrote the English lyrics for the adaptations, often with libretti by Basil Hood. His words to the songs in The Merry Widow (1907) became the standard English version of that piece, performed throughout the world for many decades. Other Continental musicals that Ross anglicised included A Waltz Dream (1908), The Dollar Princess (1909), The Girl in the Train (1910), The Count of Luxembourg (1911), The Girl on the Film (1913) and The Marriage Market (1913), most of which had enduring success throughout the English-speaking world. Other successes from this period were the musicals King of Cadonia (1908), Havana (1908), Our Miss Gibbs (1909), The Quaker Girl (1911), and Betty in 1915. In addition, many of Ross's most successful pieces had additional successes on tour in Britain, in America and elsewhere. His biggest hits on Broadway included The Girl from Kays (1903), The Merry Widow (1907 and many revivals), Havana (1909), Madame Sherry (1911) and The Quaker Girl (1911).

=== Later career ===
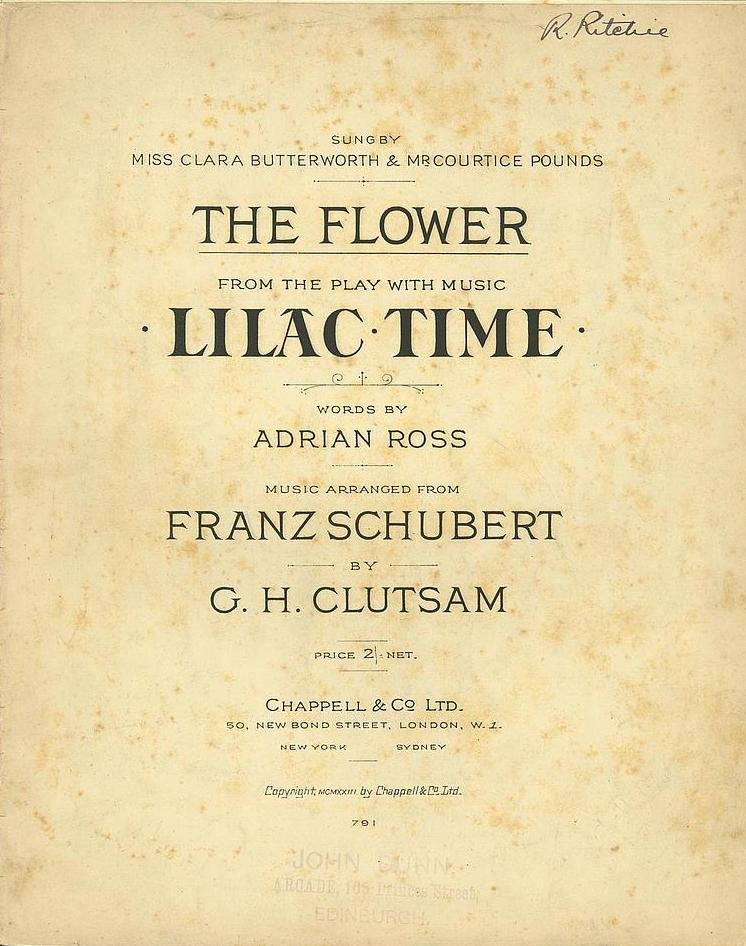
Sheet music from Lilac Time

In 1914, Ross was one of the founders of the Performing Rights Society. Ross continued, after Edwardes's death, to write lyrics for numerous shows at the Gaiety, Daly's, the Adelphi Theatre, and other London theatres. During World War I, he continued to produce hits, writing the lyrics for the musical adaptation of a French comedy, Theodore & Co (1916), the operetta Arlette (1917), the musical The Boy (1917), André Messager's adaptation of Booth Tarkington's Monsieur Beaucaire (1919, "Philomel") and contributed to A Southern Maid (1920). He also worked on the revues Three Cheers (1917) with Herman Darewski, Airs and Graces with Lionel Monckton, and, years later, Sky High for the Palladium Theatre, but these were only diversions from his chief focus of writing lyrics for musicals and operetta adaptations. In 1922, he wrote both the book and the lyrics for the popular English version of Das Dreimäderlhaus, the international hit based on Franz Schubert's music and life, produced in Britain as Lilac Time. In 1927, Ross and Dudley Glass, an Australian composer, collaborated on a musical based on The Beloved Vagabond by W. J. Locke. His last works were produced in 1930: the English adaptation of the operetta Friederike for the Palace Theatre, and a musical based on The Toymaker of Nuremberg by Austin Strong, which was produced as a Kingsway Theatre Christmas entertainment.

Ross collaborated extensively with the foremost British-based composers of musical theatre active during his productive period, including Carr, Ivan Caryll, Monckton, Leslie Stuart and Sidney Jones, and later Paul Rubens, Harold Fraser-Simson, Howard Talbot and Messager. Sixteen of his musicals ran for more than 400 performances. Ross tailored each song to fit the style required by the producer – songs for the Gaiety were different from those for Daly's. Many of his most popular shows, songs (both for the theatre and beyond it) and adaptations are still performed today.

=== Fiction and last years ===
Ross also wrote the popular horror novel The Hole of the Pit and a number of short stories. Set in 1645 during the English Civil War, the novel tells of a loathsome entity that inhabits a flooded pit amid the marshes surrounding a castle. The book is notable for its depth of characterisation – especially of the compassionate young narrator, a Puritan scholar who has refused to join Oliver Cromwell's army because of his objections to religious violence and who sees the good in everyone – and for its subtle depiction of the creature in the hole, which is never completely seen even as it overwhelms the castle. The novel was published in 1914 by Edward Arnold and never reprinted until Ramsey Campbell collected it in his 1992 anthology Uncanny Banquet. Brian Stableford called it "a minor classic of the genre". Ross also wrote Short History of Europe, edited Lady Mary Wortley-Montagu's Letters (Selection and Life), and was a contributor to Punch magazine.

Ross died of heart failure at his home in Kensington, London on 11 September 1933 at the age of 73.

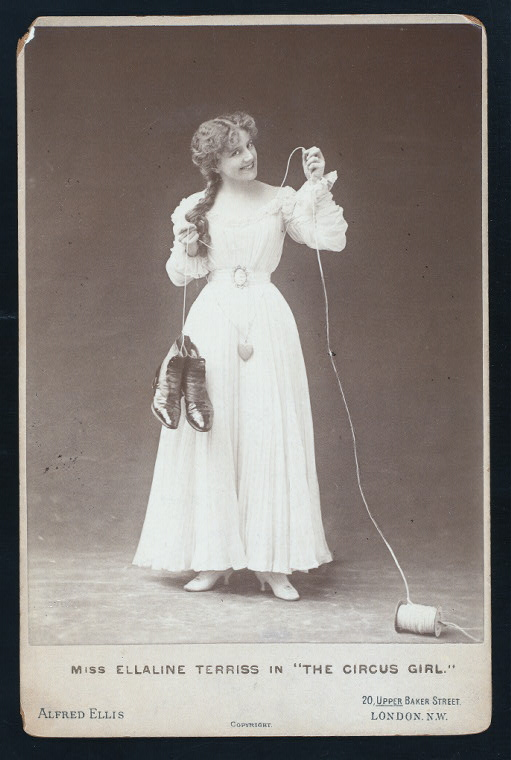
Ellaline Terriss in The Circus Girl

=== List of stage works ===
Ross contributed lyrics to the following musicals and comic operas, often in collaboration with other lyricists:

Scene from The Orchid

Millar and Evett in A Waltz Dream

Cover of the Vocal Score

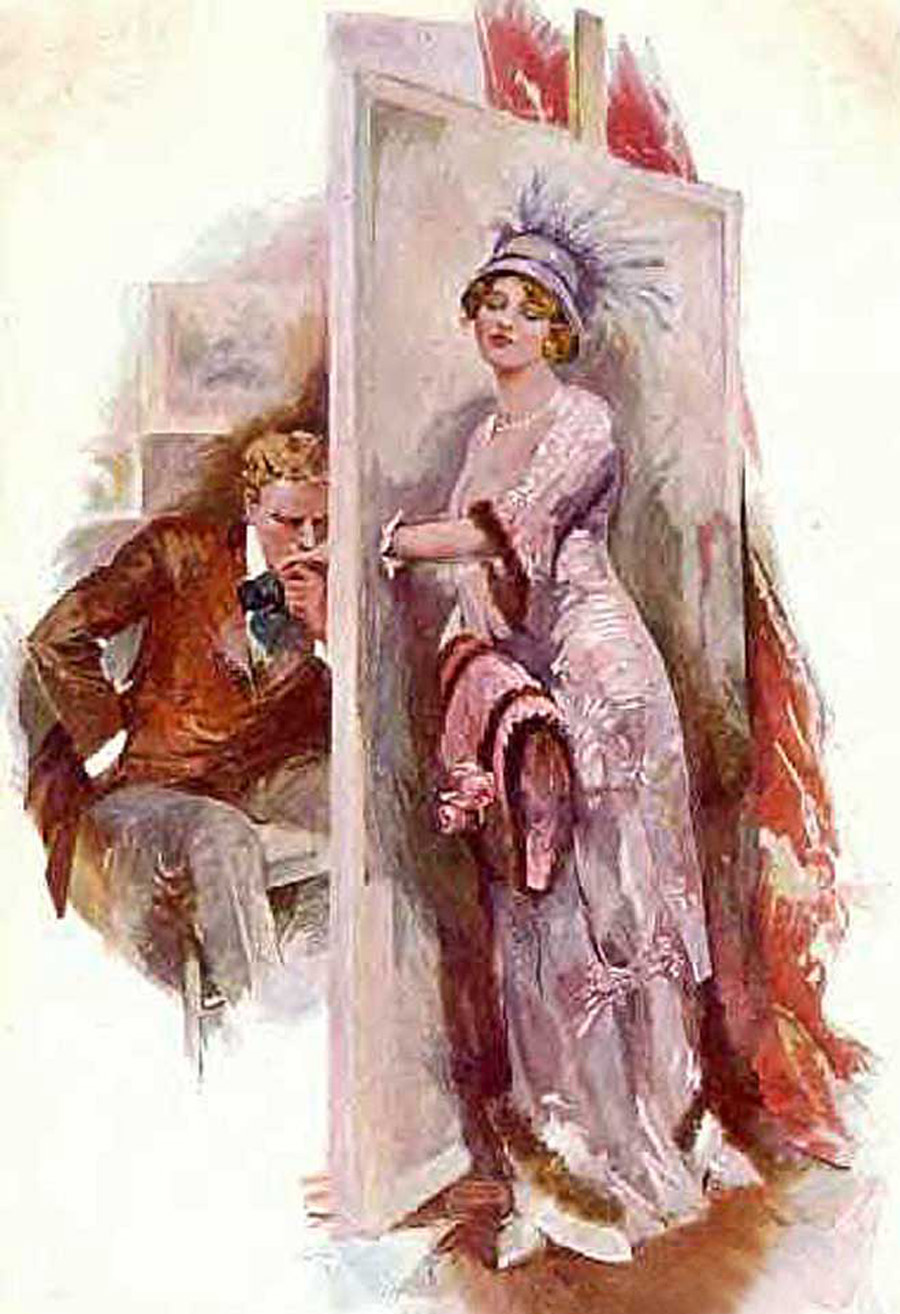
The Count of Luxembourg

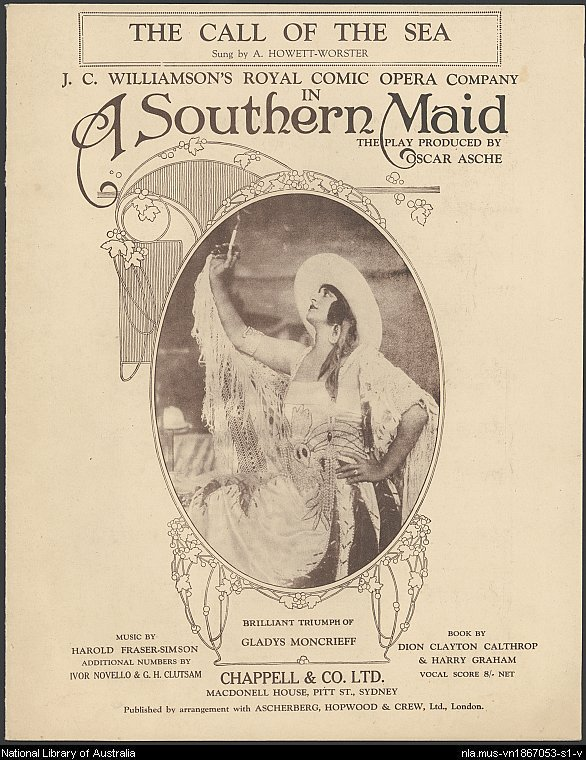
Sheet music from A Southern Maid

- Faddimir, or The Triumph of Orthodoxy (1889)
- Joan of Arc (1891) (400+ performances in total)
- Don Juan (1892, starring Roberts)
- The Young Recruit (1892)
- In Town (1892) (292 performances)
- Morocco Bound (1893) (295 performances)
- Go-Bang (1894) (129 performances)
- The Shop Girl (1894) (546 performances)
- Mirette revised English version (1894) (total of 102 performances in both versions)
- Bobbo (1895)
- Biarritz (1896) (71 performances)
- My Girl (1896) (183 performances)
- Weather or No (1896) (209 performances)
- The Circus Girl (1896) (497 performances)
- His Majesty, or The Court of Vignolia (1897) (61 performances)
- The Ballet Girl (1897)
- The Grand Duchess (1897) (104 performances)
- The Transit of Venus (1898)
- Billy (1898)
- A Greek Slave (1898) (349 performances)
- Milord Sir Smith (1898) (82 performances)
- The Lucky Star (1899) (143 performances)
- San Toy (1899) (768 performances)
- The Messenger Boy (1900) (429 performances)
- The Toreador (1901) (675 performances)
- Kitty Grey (1901) (220 performances)
- A Country Girl (1902) (729 performances)
- The Girl from Kays (1903) (432 performances; 236 performances on Broadway)
- The Orchid (1903) (559 performances)
- The Cingalee (1904) (365 performances)
- The Spring Chicken (1905) (401 performances)
- The Little Cherub (1906) (114 performances)
- Naughty Nero (1906)
- The New Aladdin (1906) (203 performances)
- See-See (1906) (152 performances).
- Les Merveilleuses (1906) (196 performances)
- The Girls of Gottenberg (1907) (303 performances)
- The Merry Widow (1907) (778 performances; 416 performances on Broadway, and many revivals)
- A Waltz Dream (1908) (146 performances)
- Havana (1908) (221 performances; 231 performances on Broadway)
- King of Cadonia (1908) (333 performances)
- The Dollar Princess (1909) (428 performances)
- The Antelope (1909)
- Our Miss Gibbs (1909) (636 performances)
- The Dashing Little Duke (1909) (101 performances)
- The Arcadians (1910, 809 performances; Broadway production: 201 performances)
- Captain Kidd (1910)
- The Girl in the Train (1910) (340 performances)
- The Quaker Girl (1911) (536 performances; 248 performances on Broadway)
- Madame Sherry (1911: 231 performances on Broadway)
- Castles in the Air (Frau Luna) (1911)
- The Count of Luxembourg (1911) (240 performances)
- Gipsy Love (1912) (299 performances)
- The Wedding Morning (1912)
- Tantalising Tommy (1912)
- The Dancing Mistress (1912) (241 performances)
- The Girl on the Film (Filmzauber) (1913) (232 performances)
- The Marriage Market (Lednyedsdr) (1913)
- The Girl from Utah (1913) (195 performances)
- The Belle of Bond Street revised version of The Girl from Kays (1914)
- Betty (1915) (391 performances)
- The Light Blues (1915)
- The Happy Day (1916) (241 performances)
- Theodore & Co (1916) (503 performances)
- Oh! Caesar (1916) (toured only)
- The Happy Family (1916)
- Arlette (1917)
- The Boy (1917) (801 performances)
- Three Cheers (1917) (revue)
- Monsieur Beaucaire (1919) (400 performances)
- The Kiss Call (1919)
- Maggie (1919)
- The Eclipse (1919)
- Medorah (1920)
- A Southern Maid (1920) (306 performances)
- The Love Flower (1920)
- The Naughty Princess (1920) (280 performances – at the Adelphi Theatre)
- Faust on Toast (1921)
- Love's Awakening (1921)
- Lilac Time (1922) (626 performances)
- The Cousin from Nowhere (1922; Der Vetter aus Dingsda, 1921, composed by Eduard Künneke) (105 performances)
- Head Over Heels (1923)
- The Beloved Vagabond (1927) (107 performances)
- Frederica (Friederike) (1930) (music by Franz Lehár)
- The Toymaker of Nuremberg (1930) (32 performances)
