= Souray =

Souray is a surname. Notable people with the surname include:

- Eleanor Souray (1880–1931), English actress
- Sheldon Souray (born 1976), Canadian ice hockey player
