= Les merveilleuses =

Les merveilleuses may refer to:

- Incroyables and merveilleuses, a fashionable subculture for aristocrats from 18th century Paris
- The Merveilleuses, a 1906 musical play
