= Daly's Theatre =

Former theatre in London

Coordinates: 51°30′40″N 0°7′46″W

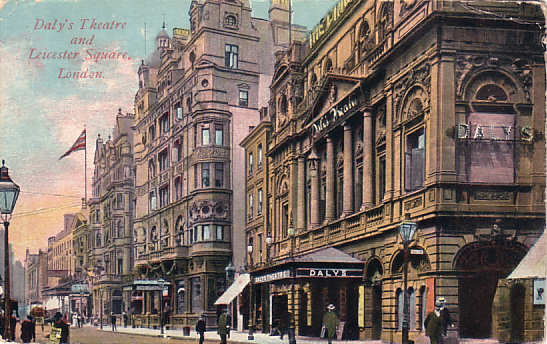
Daly's Theatre and Leicester Square, c. 1905

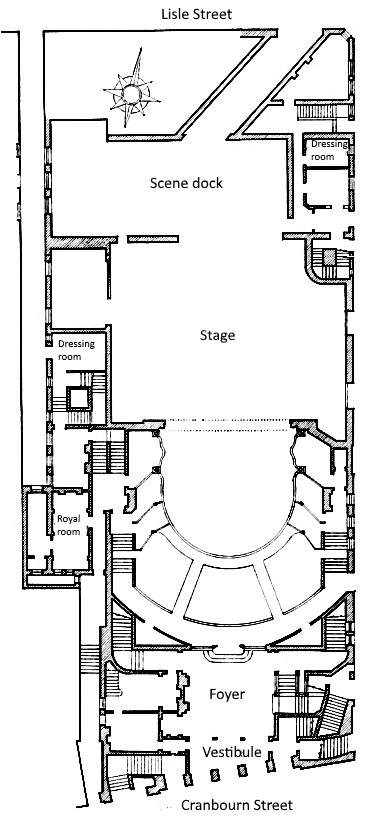
Architects' plan of the theatre

Daly's Theatre was a theatre in the City of Westminster. It was located at 2 Cranbourn Street, just off Leicester Square. It opened on 27 June 1893 and was demolished in 1937.

The theatre was built for and named after the American impresario Augustin Daly, but he failed to make a success of it, and between 1895 and 1915 the British producer George Edwardes ran the house, where he presented a series of long-running musical comedies, including The Geisha (1896), and English adaptations of operettas, including The Merry Widow (1907). After Edwardes died in 1915 Daly's had one more great hit, The Maid of the Mountains (1917), which ran for 1,352 productions, but after that the fortunes of the theatre declined; Noël Coward's play Sirocco (1927) was a notable failure. By the mid-1930s Leicester Square had become better known for cinemas. Daly's was sold to Warner Brothers who demolished it and erected a large cinema on the site.

== History ==
=== Background and early years ===
In 1884 the American producer Augustin Daly brought his company to London – the first time an entire American company had performed in the West End. The company, which included Ada Rehan, Otis Skinner, Mrs G. H. Gilbert and James Lewis, presented a season of comedies, old and new. The season was well received, and Daly brought his company to London again four times between 1885 and 1891. They played at the Lyceum, Gaiety and other theatres, but the enthusiasm of the press and public suggested that Daly should have a permanent London base. The London impresario George Edwardes secured a lease of a site owned by Lord Salisbury, bounded by Lisle Street, Ryder's Court and Cranbourne Street, and raised the money – a little under £40,000 – to build a theatre. The architect was Spencer Chadwick, who was assisted by C. J. Phipps. The theatre was one of the first in London to be built using the cantilever system, and the Italian Renaissance and neo-classical facade was more elaborate than that of most London theatres. Likewise, the entrance hall and foyer were elaborately executed and decorated. The auditorium had a seating capacity of over 1,200 in three tiers.

The theatre opened with The Taming of the Shrew, starring Rehan as Katharina. This was followed by Sheridan Knowles's The Hunchback, with Violet Vanbrugh, and in 1894 by Twelfth Night and As You Like It. After the conclusion of Daly's season the theatre presented the British premiere of Alfred, Lord Tennyson's The Foresters, which was not well received and closed after three weeks.

After this the theatre was occupied by two visiting European companies, those of Eleonora Duse, playing La Dame aux camélias in Italian, and Sarah Bernhardt in a French season. In September 1894 Edwardes presented A Gaiety Girl, transferring from the Prince of Wales Theatre, and in December the Carl Rosa Opera Company gave the British premiere of Humperdinck's Hansel and Gretel.

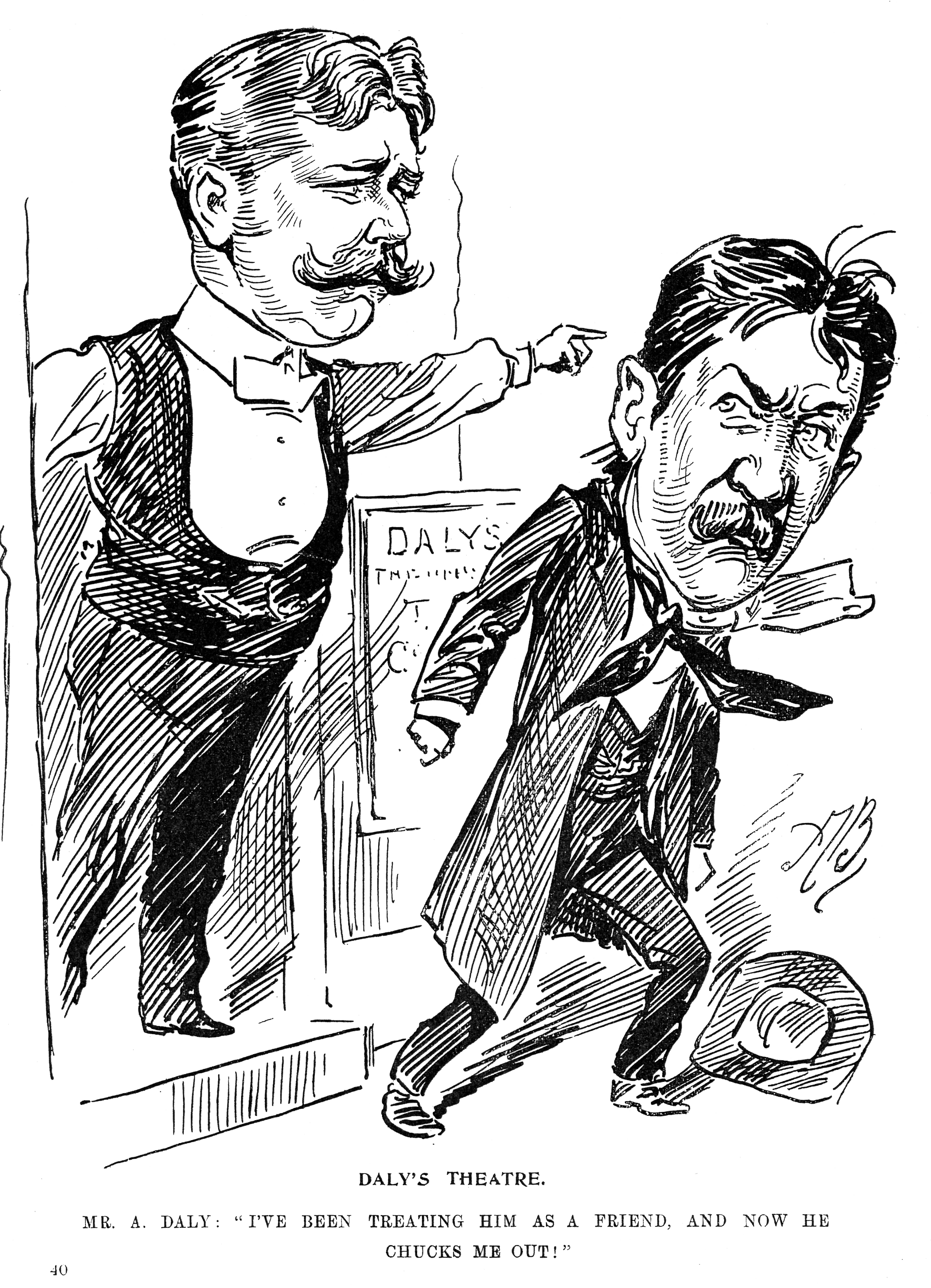
George Edwardes takes over the running of the theatre from the departing Augustin Daly

In February 1895 Edwardes presented another musical comedy, An Artist's Model, which was a considerable success, and had to be transferred to the Lyric Theatre in May to make way for another Bernhardt season at Daly's, followed by Augustin Daly's next – and as it proved last – season with his company. Daly's comedy The Railroad of Love (an adaptation of a German play) was followed by Shakespeare's Two Gentlemen of Verona. The latter had not been professionally staged in London since 1841, and despite respectful reviews and a starry cast including Rehan, Lewis, Tyrone Power, Frank Worthing and Maxine Elliott, it did not attract the public. The production of A Midsummer Night's Dream that followed did better, but as the theatre historians Mander and Mitchenson put it, "London had not responded to the Americanised classics as Daly had hoped." Although the theatre retained his name for the remaining forty-three years of its existence, his company never returned, and for the next twenty years Daly's Theatre was run by Edwardes.

=== The Edwardes years ===
Edwardes, nicknamed "the Guv'nor", ran Daly's in a lavish manner. He employed an orchestra of 40 players, and about 160 other staff in addition to the principals, supporting actors and chorus. The theatre cost him more than £3,000 a week to run. He liked to joke that he made all his money in the provinces, with touring productions of his West End hits. His chorus was celebrated, particularly the female members. In his history of Daly's (1944) D. Forbes-Winslow lists ten future stars who were in the chorus at Daly's at the start of their careers, including Gladys Cooper, Isobel Elsom and Mabel Russell. Of Edwardes's management Forbes-Winslow writes:

A performance at Daly's was a cross section of the era. Here was taste, here was artistry, here was the best of everything. And in Victorian and Edwardian days the best only was good enough. Quality mattered more than quantity. Here, under the selective power of the Guv'nor, were the best artists, the best composers, the best scenery, the best clothes, the prettiest girls, that could be found.

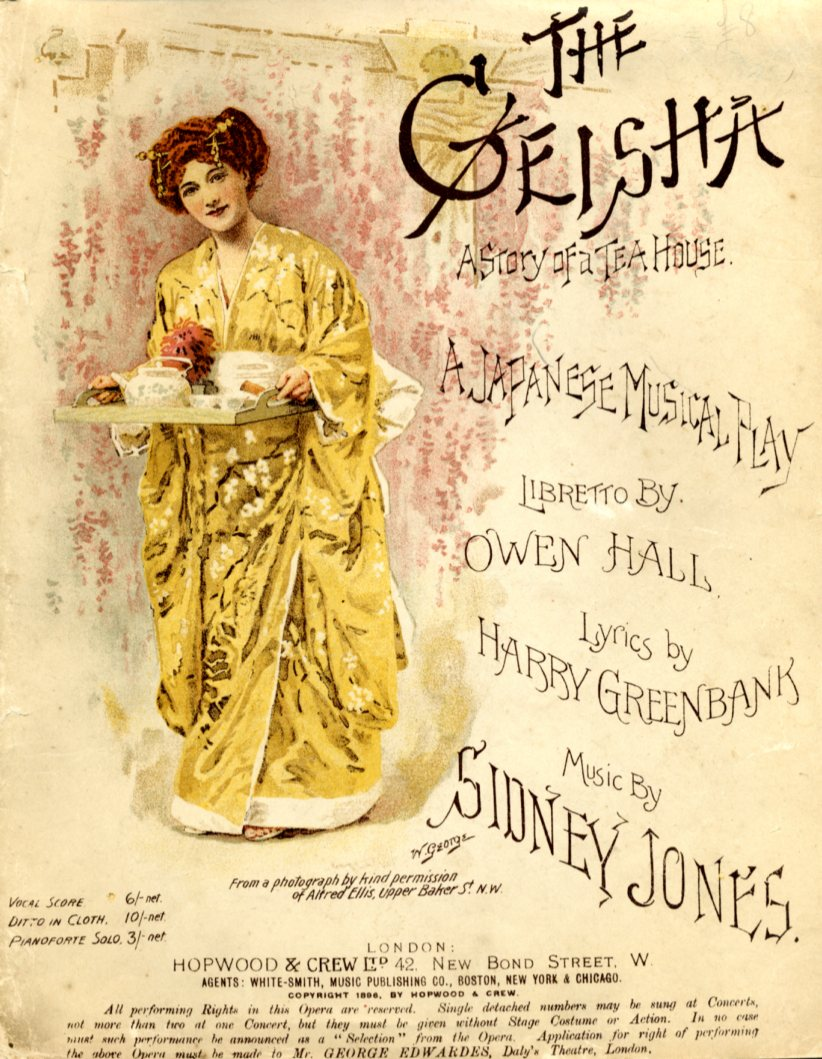
The Geisha

Edwardes engaged Sidney Jones as the resident composer and musical director, and Daly's became well known for a string of highly successful musical comedies. A second edition of An Artist's Model opened in September 1895 and was followed by The Geisha (1896), which ran for 760 performances, A Greek Slave (1898) and San Toy (1899), which ran for 768 performances. Forbes-Winslow rates Edwardes as a perceptive picker of composers: Jones wrote well-received scores for all four of these shows. In the first decade of the 20th century Edwardes's first new production at Daly's was A Country Girl (1902), with music by Lionel Monckton and Paul Rubens and words by Adrian Ross, Percy Greenbank and James T. Tanner, which ran for 729 performances. The same five contributors wrote The Cingalee (1904), which ran for 365 performances.

In 1905 Edwardes turned to continental Europe for the first time, presenting the British premiere of André Messager's The Little Michus (1905), which ran for 400 performances. The Merveilleuses (1906), with music by Hugo Felix and words by Basil Hood and Ross had a shorter run (196 performances) but The Merry Widow (1907) by Franz Lehár with English words by Hood and Ross, ran for 778 performances from June 1907 until July 1909. Mander and Michenson comment that it marked the introduction of Viennese operetta to London, albeit adapted into musical comedy.

Between the end of the run of The Merry Widow and the First World War Edwardes staged four more new shows, all English adaptations of continental operettas: Leo Fall's The Dollar Princess (1909), Lehár's The Count of Luxembourg (1911), and Gipsy Love (1912) – all with English words by Hood and Ross, and in 1913 Victor Jacobi's The Marriage Market in an adaptation by Gladys Unger, Arthur Anderson and Ross. Edwardes's last show for Daly's was Betty, with music by Rubens and Ernest Steffan and words by Frederick Lonsdale, Unger and Ross.

=== After Edwardes ===
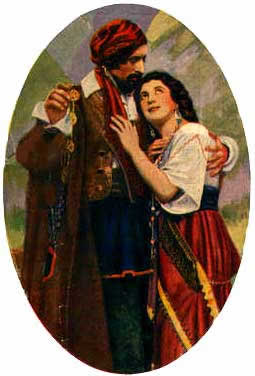
The Maid of the Mountains

Edwardes died in October 1915. He left £49,780 but also substantial liabilities. The tenor Robert Evett and Edwardes's daughter, Dorothy Sherbrook, became co-directors of Edwardes's company with Evett as managing director. The first production under the new regime was The Happy Day (1916), which ran for 241 performances. The following year the company's finances were put back on a secure footing with the enormous success of The Maid of the Mountains, which ran for 1,352 performances. This show, which introduced José Collins, daughter of Lottie Collins, was an all-British creation, with a book by Lonsdale and music by Harold Fraser-Simpson. It was followed by A Southern Maid (1920) with music by Fraser-Simpson and Ivor Novello, which ran for 306 performances, and then Sybil, by Jacobi and Harry Graham, which had a similar run.

In 1922 the trustees of the Edwardes estate sold the theatre for £200,000 to James White, a property developer and speculator with ambitions to be an impresario. The Lady of the Rose (Jean Gilbert, 1922), Madame Pompadour (Fall, 1923) and Cleopatra (Oscar Straus, 1925), all starring Evelyn Laye, were well reviewed. In 1927 the theatre's policy of presenting musicals was briefly and disastrously abandoned in favour of Noël Coward's play Sirocco, which according to Mander and Mitchenson was a failure so abject as to have passed into stage history. White, overwhelmed with debts, killed himself in 1927 and the following year the theatre was bought by Isidore W. Schlesinger. Within a year he had sold on to British Amalgamated Theatres Limited.

In 1929 Harry Welchman took over the management of the theatre. Daly's returned to musical comedies but found little further success. Seymour Hicks succeeded Welchman in 1933, and under his management That's a Pretty Thing played in 1933, Charley's Aunt was revived in 1934, and Young England was transferred there in 1935. By the mid-1930s Daly's was the last surviving theatre in Leicester Square, which had been taken over by large cinemas. It eventually closed in 1937 after the last performance of The First Legion on 25 September 1937 and was sold to Warner Bros. who demolished it.

Warners built a large cinema designed by Thomas Somerford and E. A. Stone with a marble facade sculpted by Bainbridge Copnall, featuring a large relief panel in two corners depicting the spirits of sight and sound. This building was demolished, but the marble frontage was retained, and the site was redeveloped as the Warner Village cinema complex. It changed hands again, and as of 2022 is the Vue West End.

== Sources ==
- Forbes-Winslow, D. (1944). Daly's: The Biography of a Theatre. London. OCLC 857543.
- Mander, Raymond; Joe Mitchenson (1957). Theatrical Companion to Coward. London: Rockliff. OCLC 470106222.
- Mander, Raymond; Joe Mitchenson (1976) [1968]. Lost Theatres of London (second ed.). London: New English Library. ISBN 978-0-450-02838-0.
