= Sirocco (play) =

1927 play by Noël Coward

Act II, scene 2: Sirio, standing on bar, watched by Lucy, seated

Sirocco is a play, in four acts, by Noël Coward. It opened at Daly's Theatre, on 24 November 1927. The production was directed by Basil Dean.

The play, set in Italy, depicts an affair between a local painter and a young married Englishwoman. Although it starred the popular Ivor Novello, the first night was a disaster and the play closed after 28 performances.

== Background and production ==
While on holiday in Alassio in 1921 Coward had enjoyed the atmosphere of the Combattente Club, with "much tawdry glamour … contributed by sweet champagne, an electric piano, paper streamers and the usual paraphernalia of Latin carnival", and the added attraction of an attractive young local who caught his eye and inspired the fiery, romantic hero of Sirocco. He wrote the play soon afterwards, but it remained unstaged for six years. In 1921 Coward was still little known, but by late 1927, when Sirocco was finally produced, he had established himself with two substantial successes – The Vortex (1924) and Hay Fever (1925). He had done less well in 1927. The Marquise ran in the West End for a moderate run of 129 performances, and Home Chat played for only 38. Basil Dean, who directed (or as it was phrased at the time "produced") the latter was keen to stage the six-year-old Sirocco, and Coward agreed. It opened at Daly's Theatre on 24 November 1927 and closed on 17 December.

== Original cast ==
- Miss Johnson – Ada King
- Mrs Breeze – Margaret Watson
- Mrs Griffin – Helen Ferrers
- Francine Trott – Blyth Daly
- Lucy Griffin – Frances Doble
- Sirio Marson – Ivor Novello
- The Rev Sampson Crutch – Aubrey Mather
- Stephen Griffin – David Hawthorne
- Pietro – Tony de Lungo
- Giulia – Margery Gabain
- Gianetta – Doris Garrick
- Antonio Piocchi – Arturo Gomez
- Giuseppe – George Coulouris
- Waiter – Mario Mariani
- Maria – Elizabeth Vaughan

Producer – Basil Dean; Designer – Gladys Calthrop

== Synopsis ==
The action of the play takes place in Northern Italy

=== Act I ===
==== The smoking lounge of the Palace Hotel, Bellagualia ====
Two elderly English ladies sit chatting about another guest, Stephen Griffin, who is about to go to Tunis on business, leaving his mother and his young wife, Lucy, behind at the hotel. Lucy is clearly on edge, and is short-tempered with several fellow-guests. Sirio Marson, a handsome young man, enters and engages Lucy in conversation. She compliments him on his good English, and he explains that his father was an Englishman. He attempts to continue the conversation but Lucy walks away. Later she and her husband are alone and she asks him to take her with him to Tunis, but he declines, judging it an unsuitable place for her. She tells him she is bored in the hotel and afraid that in his absence something bad will happen.

=== Act II ===
==== Scene 1: The Combattente Club, Bellagualia ====
The English people attending the festa at the club watch the locals dancing, and are mildly scandalised when Lucy is seen dancing with Sirio. The English contingent eventually leave, but Lucy accepts Sirio's invitation to return alone later.

==== Scene 2: The same, an hour or so later ====
The festa has become much more lively by the time Lucy returns. A fight breaks out between two locals and Sirio is slightly wounded when separating them. Lucy bandages his hand and finds herself falling in love with him. They leave together.

=== Act III ===
==== Sirio Marson's studio in Florence, a week later ====
While Sirio is still in bed, Stephen Griffin, backed up by his mother, comes to see Lucy. He urges her to return to him; she declines. He and his mother leave. Sirio enters and congratulates Lucy on her courage. He has received a letter from his mother, who is in difficulties and he intends to go to her. Lucy counters that she will go to Paris on her own and try to think things out. There is a quarrel and Sirio leaves. Lucy, alone, exclaims triumphantly, "I'm free – free for the first time in my life!" Then she says, "God help me!" and drops her head on her arms.

== Reception ==
The London opening of Sirocco met with violently unfavourable audience reaction and a generally adverse critical reception. Coward's biographers Mander and Mitchenson comment that the scenes in the theatre at the final curtain "have passed into stage history". Coward was later asked whether he had ever despaired when faced with a failure like Sirocco. He replied, "Well, if I'm going to have a flop, I like it to be a rouser. I didn't despair at all. What made it much more interesting was that my mother, who is slightly deaf, thought the booing was cheering. Incredibly Basil Dean, the producer of the play, made the same mistake. He was ringing the curtain up and down with a beaming smile. I said, 'Wipe that smile off your face, dear – this is it.'" Coward later said, "My first instinct was to leave England immediately, but this seemed too craven a move, and also too gratifying to my enemies, whose numbers had by then swollen in our minds to practically the entire population of the British Isles."

Despite the hostile audience response, the newspaper reviews were not universally uncomplimentary. The Times commented that Coward had brought the debacle on himself, but in The Observer St John Ervine thought Sirocco contained "more theme, more idea" than in any of Coward's plays since The Vortex. Ivor Brown in The Manchester Guardian thought the first two acts weak but the third good: "[Coward] strips his pretentious lover relentlessly; there is no mercy needed or given"

== References and sources ==
=== Sources ===
- Hoare, Philip (1995). Noël Coward, A Biography. London: Sinclair-Stevenson. ISBN 978-1-4081-0675-4.
- Mander, Raymond; Mitchenson, Joe (1957). Theatrical Companion to Coward. London: Rockliff. OCLC 470106222.
- Richards, Dick, ed. (1970). The Wit of Noël Coward. London: Sphere Books. ISBN 978-0-7221-3676-8.
