= Gaynor Rowlands =

English actress and singer

Gaynor Rowlands (3 April 1883 – 18 July 1906), was an English actress, singer, and dancer, born in London, of Welsh parents. In Wales she became known as Eos Gwalia (The Nightingale of Wales).

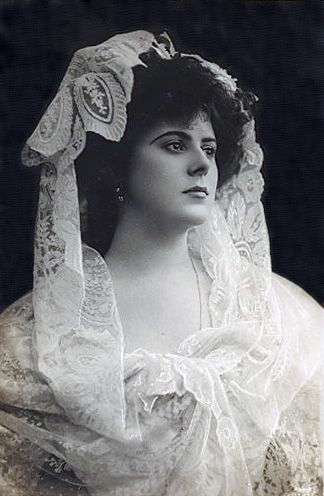
Gaynor Rowlands

Rowlands began her career in the ballet of The Empire Theatre, London under Miss Katie Lanner, graduating in 1900. She joined the company chorus line of George Edwardes’ Gaiety Theatre in 1900, toured India in 1901/02, and quickly became a star. In her time she became the most photographed of the "Gaiety Girls"; her roles were portrayed in numerous picture postcards. She was featured in periodicals such as The Era, The Stage, and The Play Pictorial, and in 1906, in The Illustrated Sporting and Dramatic News in scenes from The Spring Chicken.

Rowlands died of heart failure at the age of 23 following surgery for appendicitis. She is buried at Finchley Cemetery, North London.

Gilbert Frankau, poet and novelist, struck-up a platonic friendship with Rowlands, and described this friendship in his book Self Portrait: A Novel of His Own Life.

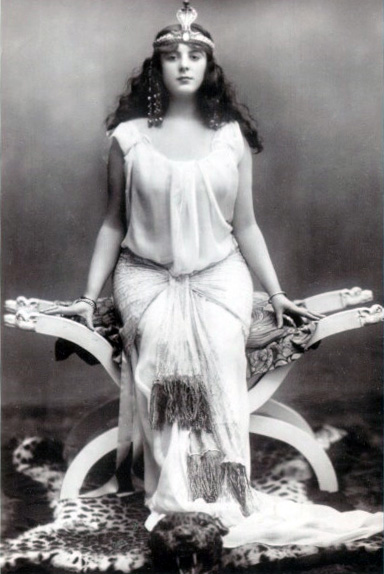
Gaynor Rowlands as Salome

== Productions ==
- The Toreador: The Gaiety Theatre 1903
- My Lady Molly (Hester): Terry's Theatre 1903-4
- La poupée (Henri): The Prince of Wales Theatre 1904
- The Orchid (Zelie Rumbert): The Gaiety Theatre 1904
- The Spring Chicken (Sylvana): The Gaiety Theatre 1905
