= Scott Russell (tenor) =

British opera singer and actor

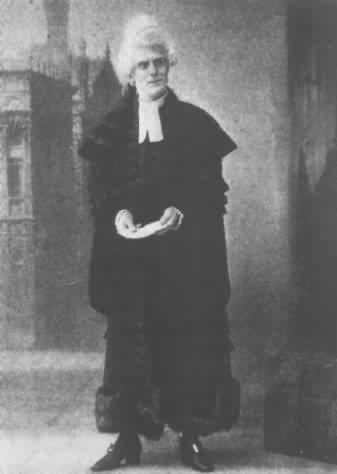
Scott Russell as Lord Dramaleigh in Utopia, Limited (1893)

Harry Henry Russell, better known as Scott Russell (25 September 1868 – 28 August 1949), was an English singer, actor and theatre manager best known for his performances in the tenor roles with the D'Oyly Carte Opera Company. He was the brother-in-law of D'Oyly Carte contralto Louie René.

== Life and career ==
Russell was born in Malvern and studied singing with Gustave Garcia at the Royal Academy of Music.

=== Early career ===
Russell made his stage debut in the chorus of the Agnes Huntingdon Company in New Jersey in the United States in 1890. With that company, he played the Marquis de Vardeuil, in Captain Therèse by Robert Planquette, at the Union Square Theatre, New York, in February 1892. His London debut came with the D'Oyly Carte Opera Company at the Savoy Theatre in 1893, where he created the role of Lord Dramaleigh in the original production of Utopia, Limited. In 1894, he created the roles of Bertuccio in Mirette and Pedro Gomez in The Chieftain at the Savoy. On the same bill as The Chieftain, he played Mr. Box in Cox and Box from December 1894 to March 1895. With D'Oyly Carte on tour later in 1895, he played Cyril in Princess Ida, and Mr. Goldbury in Utopia. Back at the Savoy in 1896, he created the role of Dr. Tannhauser in The Grand Duke and played the role of He in Weather or No (1896–97), Count Cosmo in His Majesty (1897) and Leonard Meryll in The Yeomen of the Guard (1897).

In between these runs, Russell played roles in musical comedies in West End theatres, including A Gaiety Girl (1894), Baron Golosh (1895), The Yashmak (1897), and then in a series of highly successful shows: The Geisha (1898), A Greek Slave (1898), The Gaiety Girl (1899) and San Toy (1899–1901), mostly at Daly's Theatre under the management of George Edwardes.

From 1902 to 1904, Russell returned to D'Oyly Carte, appearing in his old tenor roles and adding to his repertoire Frederic in The Pirates of Penzance, the Duke of Dunstable in Patience, Earl Tolloller in Iolanthe, Nanki-Poo in The Mikado, Marco in The Gondoliers and Ralph Rackstraw in H.M.S. Pinafore.

=== Later life and career ===
Russell appeared again at Daly's in 1906 to 1907 in The Geisha, Amasis, and Les Merveilleuses, after which he acted no more until 1910 with the Beecham Light Opera Company. He continued to perform in London and on tour until 1938. In 1932, he appeared in Derby Day. Russell's last London performances were at the Kingsway Theatre in Frederic Austin's The Beggar's Opera, as Locket, in October 1938.

Between 1920 and 1932, Russell served as the manager of the Lyric Theatre in Hammersmith.

He died in Malvern.

== Recordings ==
In 1898, Russell recorded "Take a pair of sparkling eyes" from The Gondoliers. This is generally regarded as being the first professionally produced recording of a song from a Gilbert and Sullivan opera. In 1899 he recorded the same song. In 1900, he recorded three tenor songs, from The Rose of Persia ("I Care Not If"), Princess Ida ("Would You Know") and Utopia, Limited ("A Tenor All Singers"), which appear on the Pearl CD "The Art of the Savoyard" (GEMM CD 9991).
