= Ella Snyder =

American actress

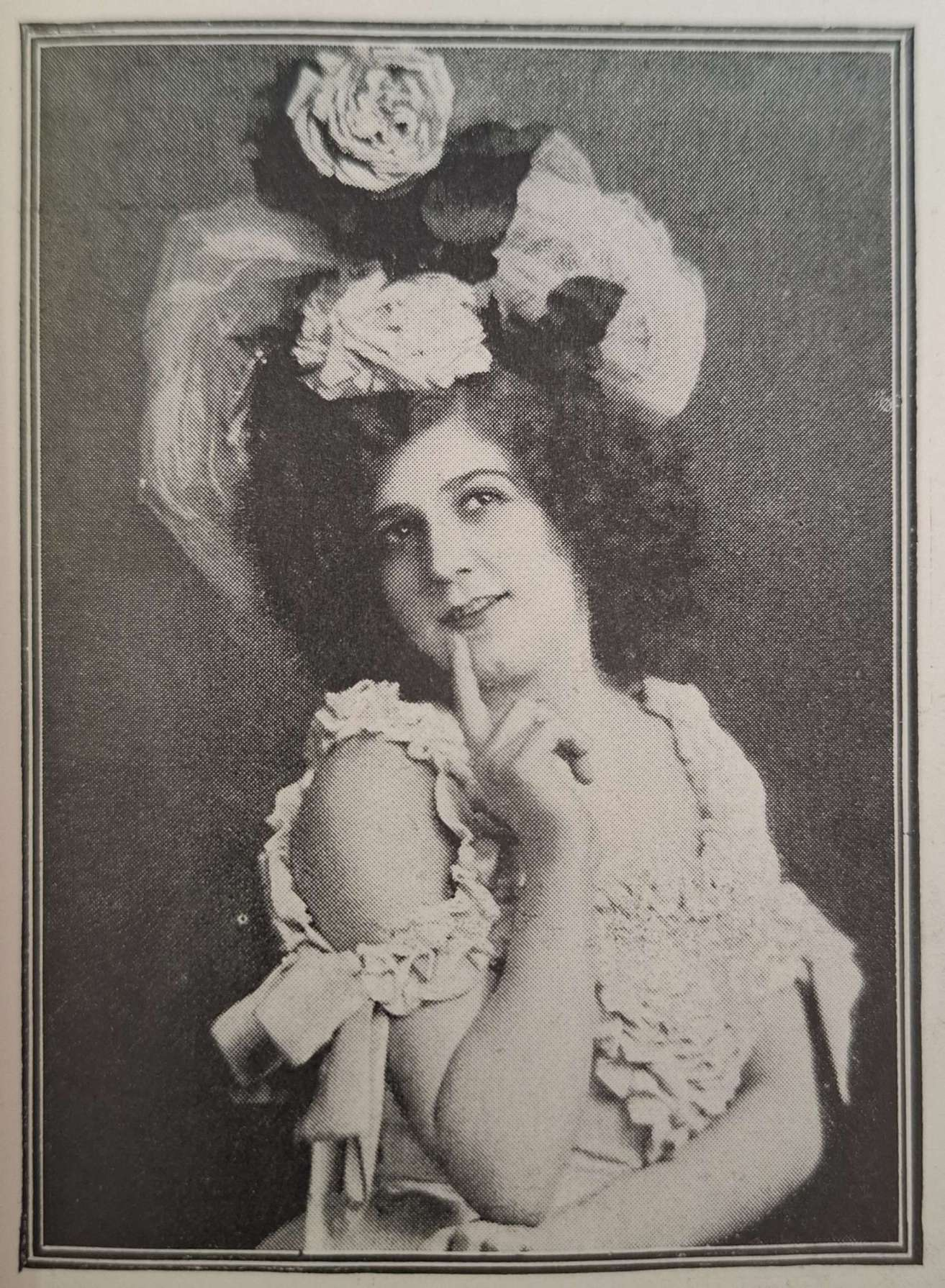
Photo of Ella Snyder as seen in the Black and White Budget, 20 October 1900.

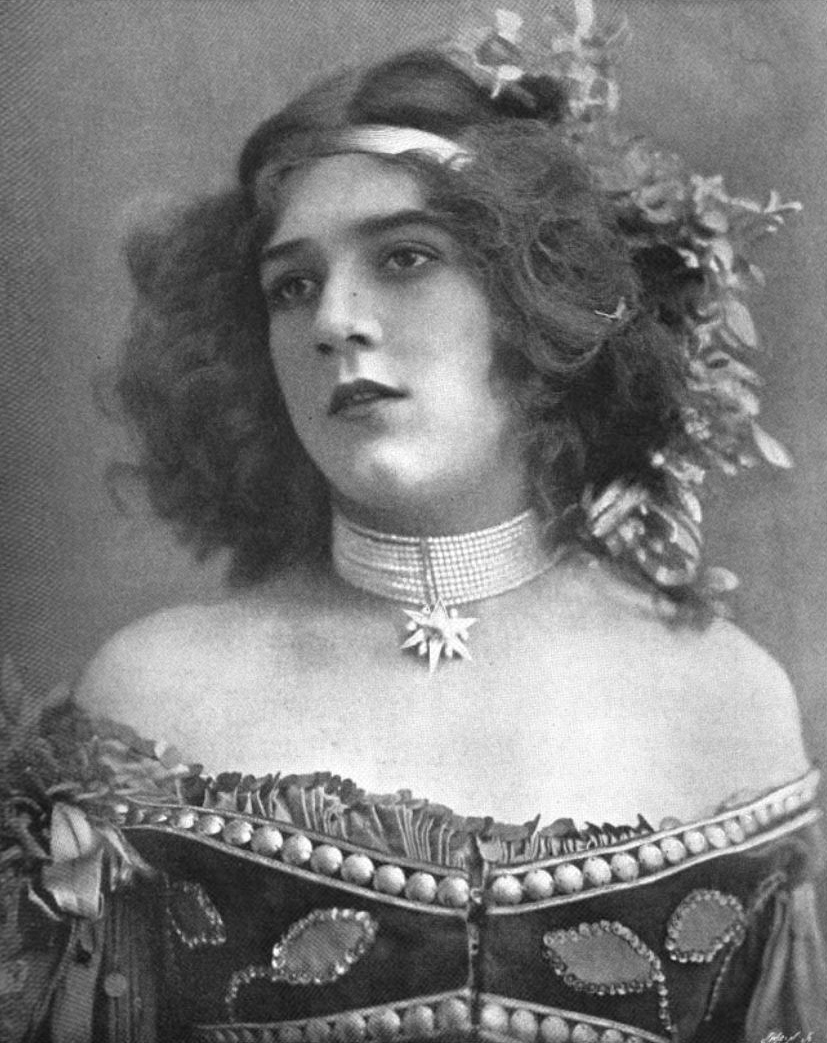
Ella Snyder in The Casino Girl

Ella Snyder (born October 7, 18??) was an American actress. She was active in theaters in London and New York City and on the American vaudeville circuit during the 1890s and 1900s. She was known for her appearances in musicals on the West End and Broadway.

== Career ==
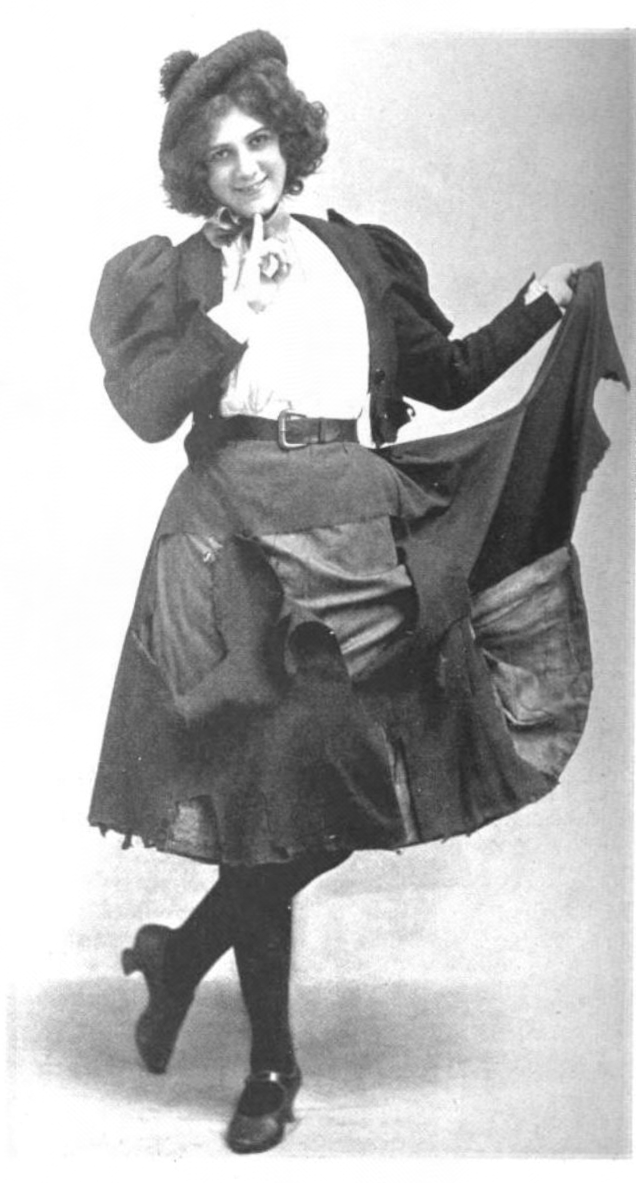
Ella Snyder in The Belle of New York

A native of Milwaukee, Wisconsin, Ella Snyder began her career as an actress in a small role in the original Broadway production of Gustave Kerker's The Belle of New York at the Casino Theatre in 1897. She continued with that production when it transferred to London's West End at the Shaftesbury Theatre; portraying Marjorie May in the UK premiere of that work in April 1898. By the following September she had taken over the lead role of Mamie Clancy in the production. Kerker composed new duets for her to sing with actor Frank Lawton for the London production. The London American Register critic wrote the following about her performance:

Miss Ella Snyder who enacts the role of a rowdy, good hearted, affectionate, active Pell Street girl, one "Mamie Clancy", is a capital actress, and thoroughly realizes the character she is entrusted with. She is, moreover, a comely damsel with an intelligent face capable of quick changes in dramatic expression."

Snyder remained with The Belle of New York production when it left London to return to Broadway's Casino Theatre in January 1900; still in the role of Mamie Clancy. She went on to star in several more Broadway musicals staged as the Casino Theatre including the roles of Roxy Rocks in the original production of The Casino Girl (1900), Laura Lee in the revival of The Casino Girl (1901), Sleeping Beauty in The Sleeping Beauty and the Beast (1901–1902), and Dolly Wagner in Fascinating Flora (1907). She was also a vaudeville performer.

Snyder returned to London multiple times during her career. She was once again at the Shaftesbury Theatre in April through June 1900 as Dottie Muffett in Kerker's An American Beauty. Soon after she starred opposite Richard Carle at the Theatre Royal, Drury Lane in A Condensed Comic Opera. She was once again at the Shaftesbury Theatre from November 1900 through January 1901 as Roxy Rocks in the London production of The Casino Girl. In 1902 she created the role of Mary Methuen in the original production of The Girl from Kays at London's Apollo Theatre.

Two photographs of Ella Snyder are included in the collection of the National Portrait Gallery, London.
