= The Spring Chicken =

Edwardian musical comedy

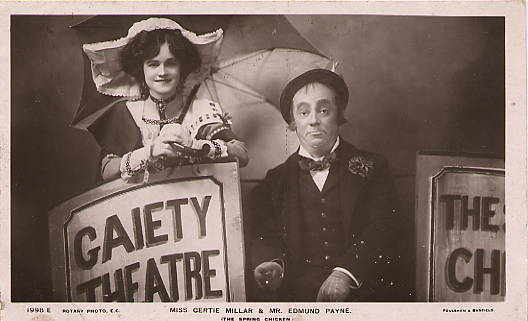
Millar (Rosalie) and Payne (Mr Girdle)

The Spring Chicken is an Edwardian musical comedy adapted by George Grossmith, Jr. from Coquin de Printemps (1897) by Jaime and Duval, with music by Ivan Caryll and Lionel Monckton and lyrics by Adrian Ross, Percy Greenbank and Grossmith. The story takes place in Paris and Château de Malmaison.

Produced by George Edwardes at the Gaiety Theatre in London, the show opened on 30 May 1905. It ran for a very successful 401 performances. The London production starred Grossmith, Harry Grattan and Gertie Millar, with Henry Lytton later joining the cast. The Spring Chicken had a Broadway run in 1906 and toured in Britain and America.

== Roles ==
- Gustave Babori (Advocate) – George Grossmith, Jr.
- Boniface (His Head Clerk) – Lionel Mackinder
- Baron Papouche (His Client) – Harry Grattan
- Félix (Head Waiter at "The Crimson Butterfly") – Robert Nainby
- Stephen-Henry (Girdle's Son) – William Spray
- Proprietor of "The Crimson Butterfly" – Arthur Hatherton
- Alexis and Ferdinand (Babori's Clerks) – George Gregory and Harry Taylor
- Waiter – Leigh Ellis
- Napoleon (Office Boy) – Master Cross
- Joseph Boniface (An Artist) – Charles Brown
- Inspector of Police – R. Tremayne
- Mr. Girdle (Babori's Father-in-Law) – Edmund Payne
- Mrs. Girdle – Connie Ediss
- Baroness Papouche – Kate Cutler
- Dulcie Babori (Babori's Wife) – Olive Morrell
- Emmy-Lou (Girdle's Niece) – Olive May
- La Modiste – Isabelle Lidster
- Sylvana, Thérèse and Henriette (Clients of Babori) – Gaynor Rowlands, Gertrude Glyn and Marguerite Gray
- Yvonne, Yvette and Céleste (Grisettes) – Kitty Mason, Fanny Dango (one of the Rudge Sisters), Ethel Oliver
- Rosalie – Gertie Millar

== Musical numbers ==
ACT I - Office of M. Babori at his Residence, Paris

- No. 1 - Opening Chorus - "If we live in the land we love, we must love in the land we live..."
- No. 2 - Song - Baron & Chorus - "As one of the Old Noblesse, I'm eager to seek redress..."
- No. 3 - Trio - Baroness, Babori & Baron - "Were you my client, Baroness, I boldly should assert you..."
- No. 4 - Song - Dulcie - "When sun and showers awake the flowers to venture forth..."
- No. 5 - Quartet - Mr. & Mrs. Girdle, Emmy-Lou & Stephen-Henry - "It seemed a dreadful bore to leave our native shore..."
- No. 6 - Song - Girdle & Chorus - "I'm slightly past the age of thirty-one, and all the many foolish things I've done..."
- No. 7 - Song - Rosalie - "I'm a country lass, you know, fresh to all the streets and houses..."
- No. 8 - Concerted Piece - " Open windows, open doors, sprinkle tea-leaves on the floors..."
- No. 9 - Quartet - Rosalie, Emmy-Lou, Boniface & Stephen-Henry - " The swallow's a dear little bird..."
- No. 10 - Song - Mrs. Girdle & Chorus - " I don't say that husbands are all of them bad..."
- No. 11 - Concerted Number - "A modiste modeste, she has done her best to make us look all most exquisitely dressed! ..."
- No. 12 - March Song - Babori & Chorus - "When the Autumn leaves are falling, I can hear my conscience calling..."
- No. 13 - Duet - Rosalie & Girdle - "I'd like to go on a London spree ... Then come with me! ..." (four verses)
- No. 14 - Finale Act I - "Here is news that's really very unpleasant! We've been patiently waiting all the day..."

ACT II - Scene 1 - The Crimson Butterfly Restaurant, Malmaison. Scene 2 - A Studio at Malmaison

- No. 15 - Opening Chorus - "If you're tired of having your meals 'mid the noise and the traffic of town..."
- No. 16 - Song - Felix & Chorus - "If the mysteries you're eager to unravel, of the world and all the doings of the day..."
- No. 17 - Duet - Rosalie & Boniface, with Chorus - "When I was a child about so high, and feeding the ducks and chickens..."
- No. 18 - Song - Rosalie & Chorus - "There once was a dear little girl you must know; you've heard of such girls, I think..."
- No. 19 - Song - Dulcie & Chorus - "When Gustave proposed to me, he went down on bended knee..." (six verses)
- No. 20 - Song - Boniface & Chorus - "Do you know the jolly student band who come in joyous train? ..."
- No. 21 - Song - Baroness & Chorus - "I wanted to obtain advice from a lawyer at his leisure..."
- No. 22 - Duet - Babori & Girdle - "When a man is young, under thirty-five, he is handsomer, stronger and sounder..."
- No. 23 - Song - Rosalie & Chorus - "Here we are you see, in our dear Paris; all is love and laughter..."
- No. 24 - Recit. and Song - Babori & Chorus - "I am the manager of the National Theatre / The drama of Britain is limping..."
- No. 25 - Finale Act II - "So come to France when you've a chance..." (reprise of parts of nos. 23 & 12)
