= The Girl from Kays =

Edwardian musical comedy Ivan Caryll and Owen Hall

Postcard advertising the musical

The Girl from Kays is a musical comedy in three acts, with music by Ivan Caryll and book and lyrics by Owen Hall. Additional songs were by Paul Rubens, Howard Talbot, Adrian Ross, Percy Greenbank and others. The farcical story concerns a misguided kiss.

The original London production, from 1902 to 1903, played for a long run of 432 performances and was followed by provincial tours. A successful New York run of 223 performances began in 1903, and successful Australian runs followed. The musical was later revised as The Belle of Bond Street.

== Productions ==
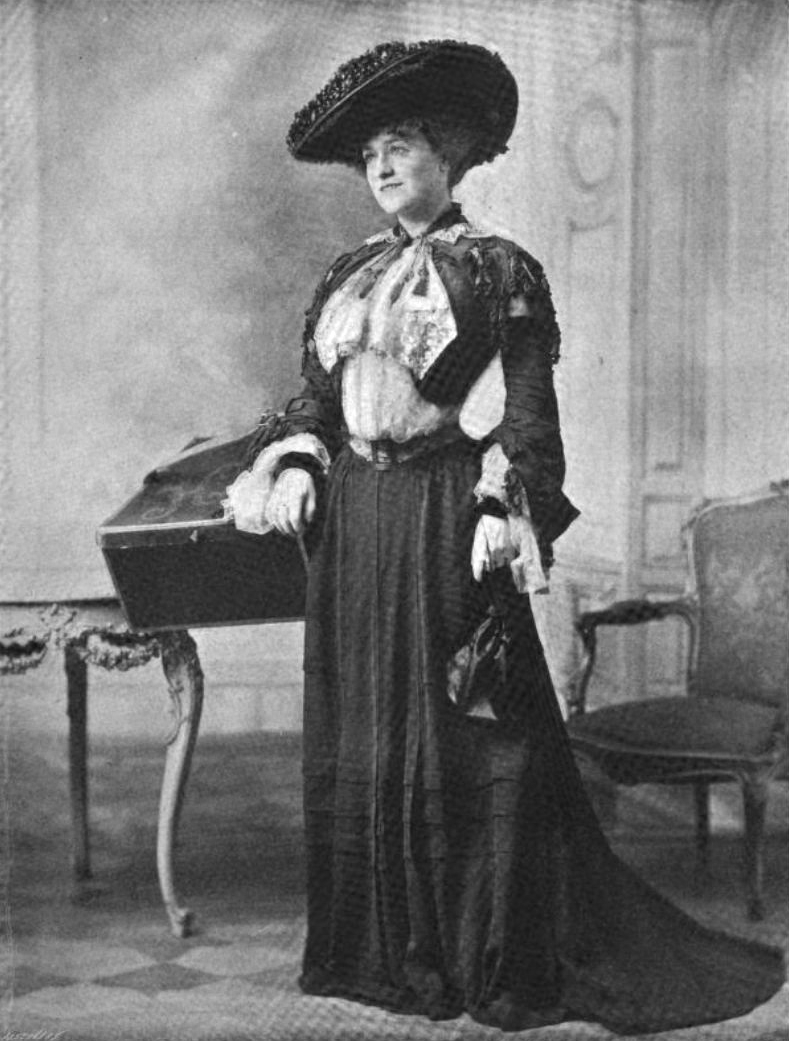
Ethel Irving as Winnie Harborough

The musical was produced by George Edwardes at the Apollo Theatre in London, opening on 15 November 1902 and moving to the Comedy Theatre on 14 December 1903 to finish its run of 432 performances. Florence Young replaced Ethel Irving in the title role, Gabrielle Ray took over Letty Lind's role during the original run, and Kitty Gordon also appeared in the musical. Despite its long run, the expensive production lost money, which had to be recouped in provincial tours.

The Girl from Kays had a successful New York run of 223 performances at the Herald Square Theatre, beginning 3 November 1903, and successful Australian runs. Elsie Ferguson starred in New York. It was later revised as The Belle of Bond Street.

== Synopsis ==
Setting: Chalmers' Flat, Grand Hotel, Flacton-on-Sea and the Savoy Restaurant

Norah and Harry are just about to leave on their honeymoon, when Nora's new hat is delivered by Winnie, the girl from Kays hat shop. Winnie is an old friend of Harry's, and she congratulates him with a kiss. Nora and her family see this and misunderstand.

The honeymoon proceeds, but in separate rooms, with further complications added by bridesmaids, shopgirls from Kays, hotel staff, relatives and mis-steps of the booby Percy Fitzthistle. An American millionaire named Hoggenheimer takes a liking to Winnie. Eventually, Nora understands the truth, and forgives Harry at the restaurant of the Savoy Hotel.

== Roles and original cast ==
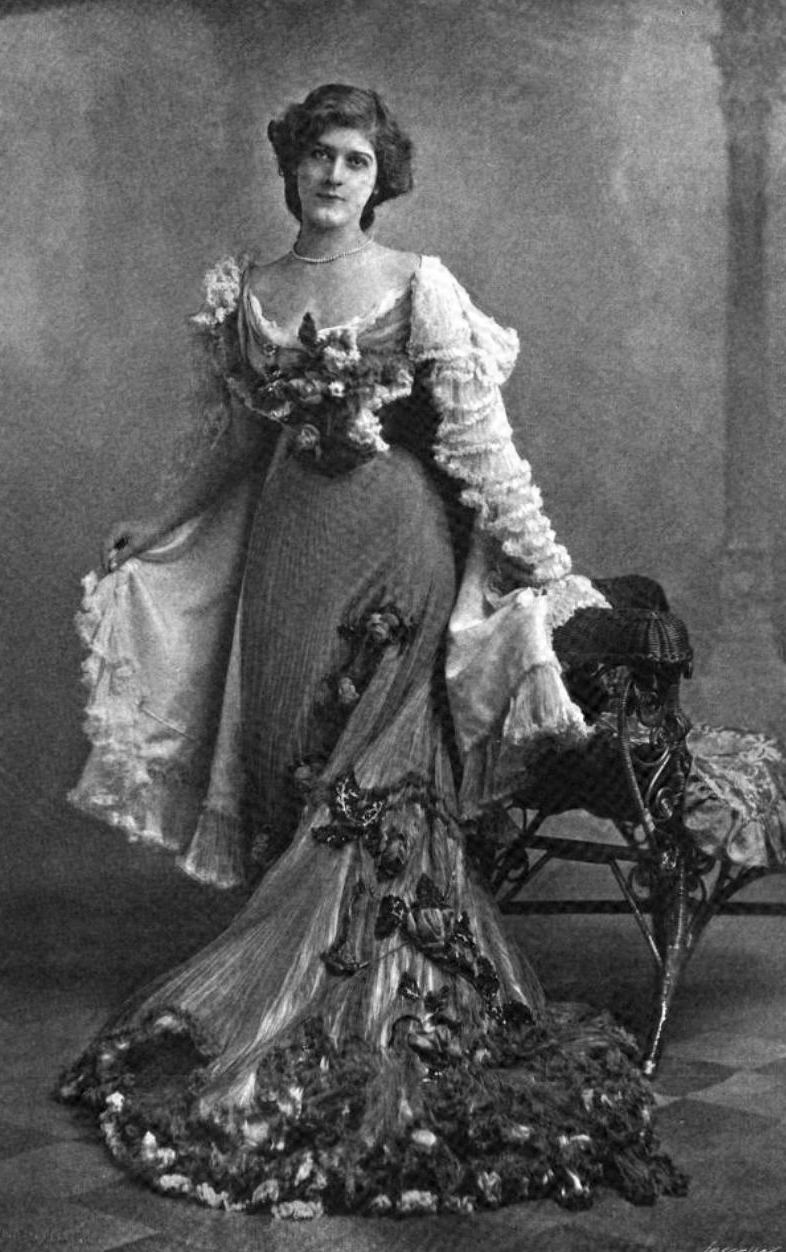
Ella Snyder in the 1902 production

- Norah Chalmers – Kate Cutler
- Ellen (Her Maid) – Letty Lind
- Mrs. Chalmers – Marie Illington
- Nancy Lowley, Mary Methuen, Cora Paget, Mabel Macdonald and Hilda French (Assistants at Kay's) – Ella Snyder, Kitty Gordon, Georgie Read, Nellie Souray and Marie Billing
- Rhoda Leslie, Ella Wyly, Maud Racine, Gertrude Hildesley, Olive Whitney and Joan Mayen (Norah's Bridesmaids) – Delia Beresford, Vashti Earle, Evelyn Corry, Rosie Chadwick, Edith Neville and Irene Allen
- Jane – Kitty Ashmead
- Winnie Harborough (The Girl from Kay's) – Ethel Irving
- Harry Gordon – W. Louis Bradfield
- The Hon. Percy Fitzthistle – Aubrey Fitzgerald
- Theodore Quench, K.C. – W. Cheeseman
- Mr. Chalmers – E. W. Garden
- Joseph (Hall Porter at Flacton Hotel) – William Wyes
- Archie Pembridge – J. Thompson
- Frank (Waiter at Savoy Restaurant) – Ernest Lambart
- Pepper (Page Boy of Flacton Hotel) – Master Bottomley
- Scavvin (Proprietor of Flacton Hotel) – E. Fence
- Max Hoggenheimer – Willie Edouin

== Musical numbers ==
Act I - Chalmers' Flat

- No. 1 - Chorus of Bridesmaids, with Norah - "We're the bright and bridal bevy who have recently attended..."
- No. 2 - Norah and Bridesmaids - "As I came up the aisle, supported by dear father..."
- No. 3 - Norah and Chorus - "We've come for you ladies, no pretty bridesmaid is allowed to be absent by stealth..."
- No. 4 - Winnie - "When a girl of commonsense wants to make a competence..."
- No. 5 - Harry - "Oh, when a young man takes a wife, his bachelor chrysalis shedding..."
- No. 6 - Finale Act I - "Now we see the carriage stand before the door ... it will take the wedded couple to the station..."

ACT II - Grand Hotel, Flacton-on-Sea

- No. 7 - Chorus - "Sunday at Flacton-on-Sea, isn't it jolly in summer? Who isn't happy to be here..."
- No. 8 - Norah & Harry - "We're married, I cannot deny ... Then what are we going to do?..."
- No. 9 - Mary & Chorus - "We are good little girls, very worldly and wise, and we can teach you just a few things..."
- No. 10 - Winnie & Chorus - "If you'd like to know the ways of the customers at Kay's..."
- No. 11 - Ellen & Chorus of Bridesmaids - "Oh, the fine folk with their marriages too fussy always are..."
- No. 12 - Norah - "I dreamed my husband's love was pure as snow, Papa! ..."
- No. 13 - Nancy - "Sambo was a coffee colour'd coon ..."
- No. 14 - Harry - "Women are extraordinary beings! Upon my word, I don't know what to think! ..."
- No. 15 - Finale Act II - "He has gone his ways with a girl from Kay's, but why should you weep, and why sigh? ..."

ACT III - The Savoy Restaurant

- No. 16 - Act III Introduction
- No. 17 - Winnie and Harry - "Wife and I have had a quarrel, she believes me far from moral..."
- No. 18 - Mary, with Chorus - "When love stands at the heart's door of a maiden..."
- No. 19 - Harry, with Chorus - "Supposing things look black in town, and you feel rather blue..."
- No. 20 - Winnie & Chorus - "It's very nice to be a dame of high degree, with blood and reputation beautifully blue..."
- No. 21 - Finale - "She'll marry Hoggenheimer of Park Lane..."

Additional numbers

- No. 22 - Percy - "When I gaze in this glass my reflections go back to the time when I was a boy..."
- No. 23 - Harry - "There was a little builder once to build a house began..."
- No. 24 - Nancy, Ellen, Fitzthistle, & Frank - "I want to give a birthday party here..."

== In popular culture ==
The comic character Max Hoggenheimer was selected by the South African cartoonist Daniël Cornelis Boonzaier to symbolise the avaricious and oppressive Randlord and mining capitalism, and frequently featured in Boonzaier's work.
