= A Southern Maid =

English operetta, 1917

José Collins as Dolores

A Southern Maid is an operetta in three acts composed by Harold Fraser-Simson, with a book by Dion Clayton Calthrop and Harry Graham and lyrics by Harry Graham and Harry Miller. Additional music was provided by Ivor Novello and George H. Clutsam, with additional lyrics by Adrian Ross and Douglas Furber. It starred José Collins and Bertram Wallis.

The show originally opened at the Prince's Theatre in Manchester on 24 December 1917. It also had three short engagements in Edinburgh between 1918 and 1920. The planned West End opening was delayed by the continuing success of The Maid of the Mountains, but A Southern Maid eventually reopened on 15 May 1920, when The Maid of the Mountains finally closed and Daly's Theatre became available. The piece was produced under the management of Robert Evett and ran for 306 performances, a good run for the period, although dwarfed by that of its predecessor.

The J. C. Williamson company toured the operetta in Australia in 1923 (starring Gladys Moncrieff) and 1936.

A 1933 film was made based on the operetta, starring Amy Veness, Lupino Lane, and Bebe Daniels.

== Cast ==
Walter Wex (Mark Lester), Francesco del Fuego (Bertram Wallis), and Todo (Lionel Victor)

- Walter Wex – Mark Lester
- Sir Willoughby Rawdon – Claude Flemming
- Todo – Lionel Victor
- Lord Toshington – William Spray
- Francesco del Fuego – Bertram Wallis
- Juanita – Dorothy Monkman
- Chiquita – Gwendoline Brooden
- Dolores – José Collins

== Synopsis ==
Dolores (José Collins) and Willoughby (Claude Flemming)

The action is set in Santiago. Todo, the proprietor of a café, and Mr. Walter Wex, who is the manager of a plantation owned by Sir Willoughby Rawdon are conversing. The truculent Francesco del Fuego enters. He boasts of his successful robberies and talks of his plans to marry the captivating Dolores. Had it not been for the arrival of Sir Willoughby Rawdon, Franceso's amatory aspirations might have been fulfilled, but Sir Willoughby and Dolores have met, and fallen in love.

Rawdon is unpopular with the inhabitants of Santiago, not for anything he has done but because of the unscrupulous way in which his father acquired the plantation, depriving local people of their orange groves. Trading on this, Francesco raises the cry of the vendetta, and cards are drawn to decide who is to be the instrument of vengeance. Francesco stacks the deck, to ensure that the fatal card is drawn by Dolores. She makes a passionate appeal to Willoughby to ensure safety by leaving the island. He, however, is too much in love with her to relinquish her or yield to his formidable rival.

Francesco, however, is pushed off a cliff into the sea, and escapes from drowning by the timely arrival of a boat's crew from Willoughby's yacht. This cools his ardour, and he calls the vendetta off, leaving Willoughby and Dolores free to marry in safety.

== Critical reception ==
Although The Times found echoes of an earlier show in A Southern Maid, the show with which it compared the newcomer was not The Maid of the Mountains, but Chu Chin Chow: "True, the scene of A Southern Maid is laid in Santiago and not in Baghdad, but there was something very familiar about the market place with its picturesque splashes of colour, with the people taking their siesta ... even the white mule was there." The paper found the music "strangely familiar", and was disappointed at the tameness of the dénouement, but was full of praise for the staging and performances. In The Manchester Guardian, Neville Cardus praised the music as "both popular in its lilt and musicianly in its orchestral detail", and found one passage "good enough to remind us of Elgar." The Daily Mirror was enthusiastic: "...yet another wonderful success, sumptuous in colour and rich in musical rhythms ... palpitates with fire and life."
