= Olive Morrell =

English actress and singer (1877–1937)

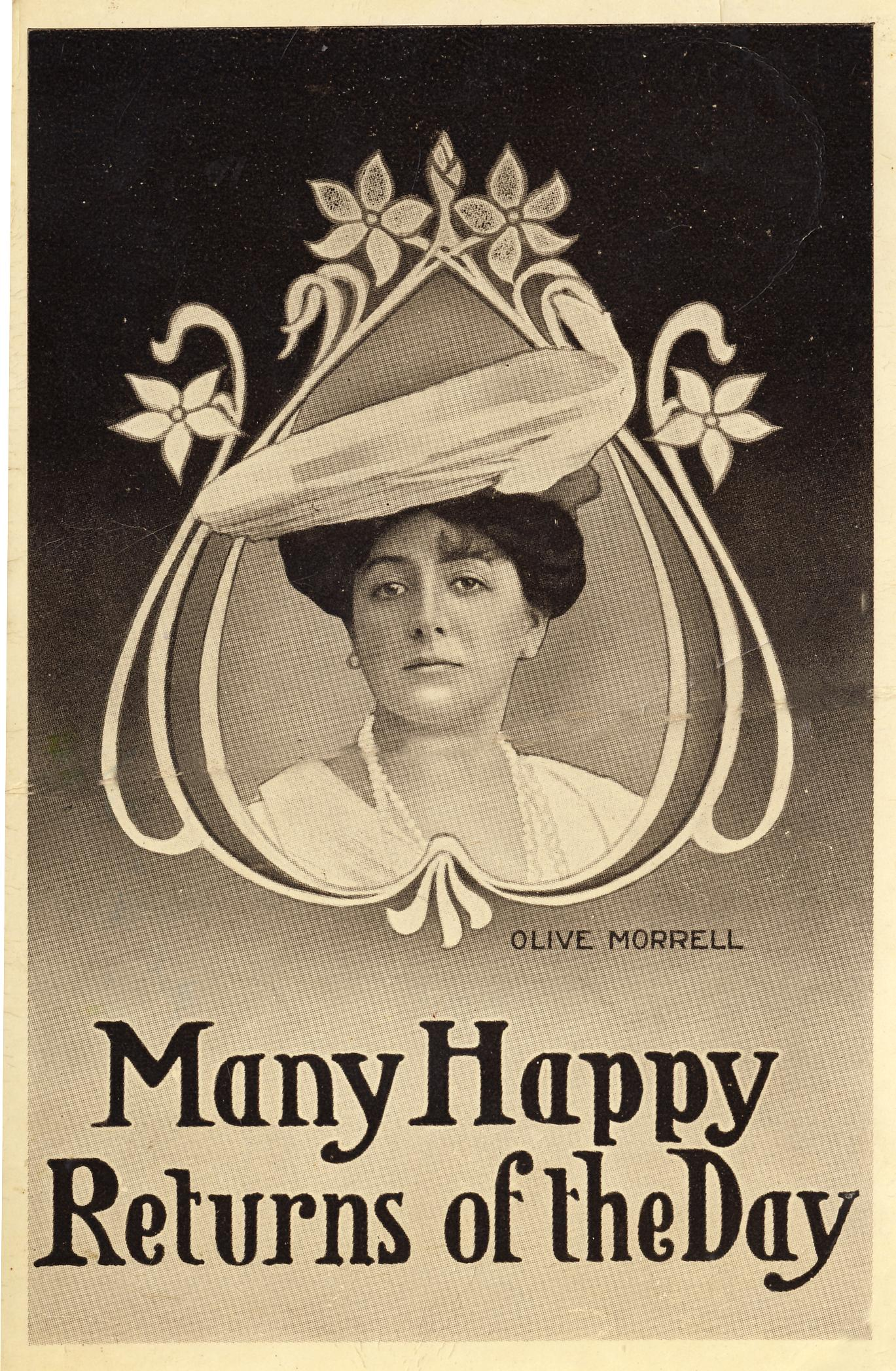
Olive Morrell

Olive Morrell, born Olive Miller (1877–1937), was an English actress, singer and Gaiety Girl best known for her roles in Edwardian musical comedies.

== Early life ==
Morrell was born in Highbury in 1877 and grew up in Highgate, near London. A singing teacher introduced her to theatrical producer George Edwardes, which led to roles at the Gaiety Theatre, London.

== Career ==
Morrell played roles in the Edwardian musical comedies A Greek Slave (1898–1899), San Toy (1900), A Country Girl (1902–1904), The Catch of the Season (1904–1906), Sergeant Brue (1904), Under a Panama (1904), The Talk of the Town (1905), and The Spring Chicken (1905). She appeared in a benefit performance of Gilbert and Sullivan's Trial by Jury in 1906.

As a Gaiety Girl, Morrell's appearance and gowns were at least as reviewed as her talents, and she was a popular subject for photo postcards. In 1904, Morrell defended actresses from criticism by writer Marie Corelli, writing: "Actresses are not more extravagant than other people."

She toured as a performer in musicals and pantomime in Australia for six months in the 1906–1907 season. The press interest in her appearance continued: "She is distinctly English, with her lovely complexion of milk and roses, a skin as fine as a baby's, straight delicate features, and good grey eyes", wrote one interviewer in a Melbourne newspaper, continuing to describe her teeth ("perfect"), her smile ("bewitching"), her eyebrows, her hair, her height, and her dress. In the same 1906 interview, Morrell said:

"If any girl has any ability for the stage, I never blame her for going on. ... It is really the best thing a woman can do, and now there is a very much better class upon the stage. Managers have realized, I think, that a girl who is decently educated and nicely brought up is quicker to understand and learn, and also that she generally makes a better impression than the comparatively uneducated girl."

== Personal life ==
Morrell married Australian politician Willie Kelly in 1908, in London. In 1909 the couple had a daughter, Mary Wentworth Kelly, and in 1911 they were living with four servants in Knightsbridge in London. When they separated, Morrell moved back to England with their daughter.

Morrell died in Hampstead in London in 1937.
