= Weather house =

Hygrometric folk art

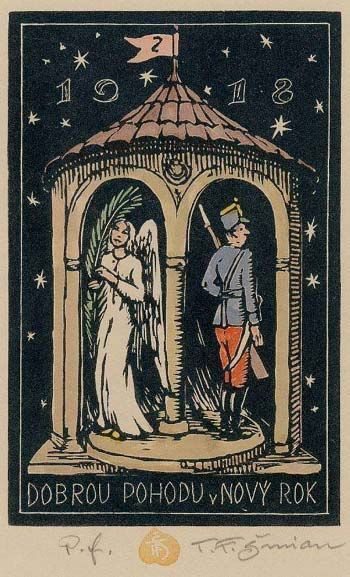
A weather house is depicted on this New Year's Day greeting card by the Czech artist Tavik Frantisek Simon.

A weather house is a folk art device in the shape of a small German or Alpine chalet that indicates the weather. A typical weather house has two doors side by side. The left side has a girl or woman, the right side a boy or man. The female figure comes out of the house when the weather is sunny and dry, while the male (often carrying an umbrella) comes out to indicate rain.

== Description ==
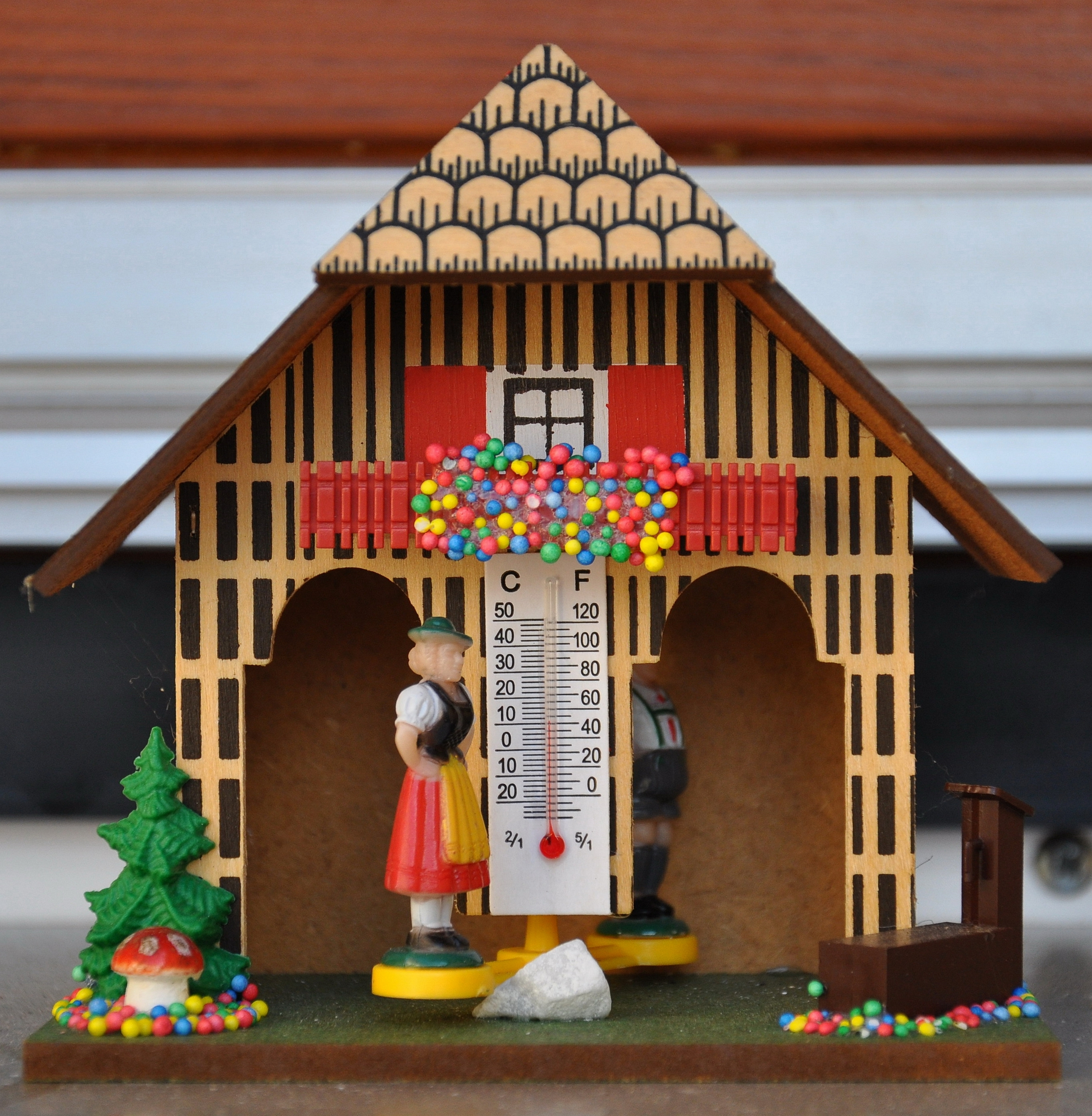
Alpine weather house, produced 2015 in Germany.

In fact, a weather house functions as a hygrometer embellished by folk art. The male and female figures ride on a balance bar, which is suspended by a piece of catgut or hair. The gut relaxes or shrinks based on the humidity in the surrounding air, relaxing when the air is wet and tensing when the air is dry. This action swings one figure or the other out of the house depending on the humidity. Some variants function as a barometer: low pressure indicates bad (rainy) weather, high pressure good (sunny) weather.

== History ==
The first written mention is in 1726, Theatrum Aerostaticum by Jacob Leupold, who describes a (hygrometer type) weather house he constructed many years before. An encyclopedia entry by 1735 (Zedlersches Lexikon) mentions weather houses as commonly available on markets.

== Cultural background and influence ==
Weather houses are associated in the popular mind with Austria, Germany or Switzerland, and are often decorated in the style of a cuckoo clock. They are often sold as "typical German" souvenirs to travellers from other countries. Many weather houses also bear a small thermometer on the part between the two doors that conceals the gut suspension, and many also contain a piggy bank.

In contrast, the term "weather house" in the United States referred to buildings built by the U. S. Signal Service and then the U. S. Weather Bureau to house the instruments and Chief Weather Observers so that they could do their job. The National Weather Service, the successor to the U. S. Weather Bureau, now uses the term "shelter".

A one-act English comic opera called Weather or No, about the male and female figures in a weather house falling in love, became popular when it was played as a companion piece to The Mikado in 1896-97.

The Brollys is an animated television series about a boy who is magically transported every night into the weather house on the wall of his bedroom.

Weather houses are mentioned in the novel Wintersmith by Terry Pratchett.
