= Harry Bulger =

American actor (1872–1926)

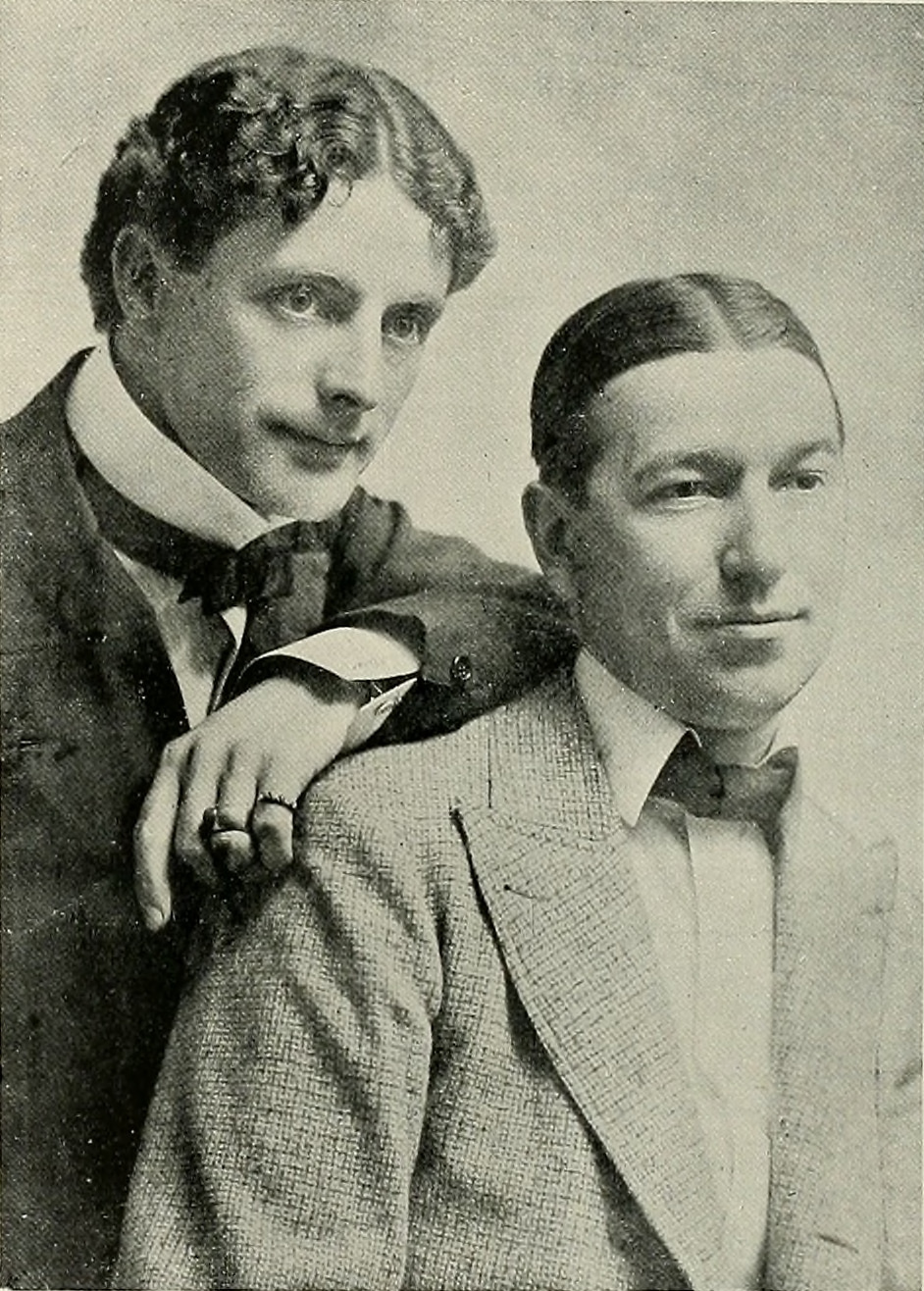
Sherrie Matthews (left) and Harry Bulger (right)

Harry Bulger (1872 - April 14, 1926) was an American actor and comedian known for his performances in musicals and in vaudeville from the 1890s through the 1920s. A long time stage partner of Sherrie Matthews, he was one half of the vaudeville duo Matthews and Bulger.

== Life and career ==
Born in 1872, Bulger began his career in the early 1890s performing in vaudeville with Sherrie Matthews in the act Matthews and Bulger. The duo continued to perform together in vaudeville circuits nationally as headliners until Matthews' death in 1911. He made his Broadway debut in 1899 at the Herald Square Theatre as Boston Budge in the musical By the Sad Sea Waves; a work for which he was also a librettist. He starred in several more Broadway musicals over the next seven years, including the roles of Eli Frost in The Night of the Fourth (1901), King Henry VIII in The King's Carnival (1901), King Bardout in The Sleeping Beauty and the Beast (1901–1902), Jack in Mother Goose (1903–1904), The Blue Jay in Woodland (1904–1905), Dr. Hosler in When We Were Forty-one (1905), and Steve Waffles in The Man from Now (1906). After several years absence, he later returned to Broadway as Andrew Overdraft and Joe Silver in The Cohan Revue of 1916 and as Constables in the revival of Reginald DeKoven's The Highwayman (1917).

Harry Bulger died of pneumonia on April 14, 1926, in Freeport, New York.
