= Weather or No =

Comic opera by Bertram Luard-Selby, Adrian Ross and William Beach

Weather or No is a one-act comic opera, styled a "musical duologue", by Bertram Luard-Selby with a libretto by Adrian Ross and William Beach. It was produced at the Savoy Theatre from 10 August 1896 to 17 February 1897 as a companion piece to The Mikado, and from 2 March 1897 to 24 April 1897 with His Majesty, for a total of 209 performances.

Copies of the libretto and the vocal score (published in 1896 by J. Williams) are found in British Library. There are five musical numbers, including three duets and a solo for each character.

== Background ==
When the Gilbert and Sullivan partnership disbanded after the production of The Gondoliers in 1889, impresario Richard D'Oyly Carte filled the Savoy Theatre with a combination of new works and revivals of the Gilbert and Sullivan operas. The fashion in the late Victorian era was to present long evenings in the theatre, and so producer Richard D'Oyly Carte preceded his Savoy operas with curtain raisers. W. J. MacQueen-Pope commented, concerning such curtain raisers:

This was a one-act play, seen only by the early comers. It would play to empty boxes, half-empty upper circle, to a gradually filling stalls and dress circle, but to an attentive, grateful and appreciative pit and gallery. Often these plays were little gems. They deserved much better treatment than they got, but those who saw them delighted in them. ... [They] served to give young actors and actresses a chance to win their spurs ... the stalls and the boxes lost much by missing the curtain-raiser, but to them dinner was more important.

One of the writers of Weather or No, Adrian Ross, would go on to become one of the most prolific and successful lyricists of Edwardian musical comedies.

== Synopsis ==
The story concerns two figures who come in and out of a toy weather house according to whether it is wet or dry, and so they cannot meet. Nevertheless, the couple fall in love and eventually wrench themselves away from their supports so that they may be together.

== Cast information ==
The original cast was:

- She. Emmie Owen for the first week, then Beatrice Perry
- He. Scott Russell

== Critical reception ==
A review in The Musical Times of 1 September 1896 stated,

The book, by Messrs. Adrian Ross and W. Beach, is bright and smartly written, and the music, by Mr. B. Luard Selby, is graceful, refined, and by no means lacking in point and humour. The characters, impersonated with fair success by Miss Emmie Owen and Mr. Scott Russell, are the "He" and "She" of a toy weatherhouse, who emerge alternately from their respective doors in obedience to the vagaries of our fitful climate. The funny little couple fall in love, but find courtship so difficult under the circumstances that they wrench themselves away from their supports and leave the weather to take care of itself. The trifle will be welcome to those who require pieces suitable for private theatricals.
