= A Greek Slave =

- Poster for a 1906 touring production
- Music: Sidney Jones; Lionel Monckton
- Lyrics: Harry Greenbank; Adrian Ross
- Book: Owen Hall
- Productions: 1898 West End; 1899 Broadway

A Greek Slave is a musical comedy in two acts, first performed on 8 June 1898 at Daly's Theatre in London, produced by George Edwardes and ran for 349 performances. The score was composed by Sidney Jones with additional songs by Lionel Monckton and lyrics by Harry Greenbank and Adrian Ross. The libretto was written by Owen Hall. It starred Marie Tempest, Letty Lind, Hayden Coffin, Scott Russell, Huntley Wright and Rutland Barrington among other popular London stars. The show had a brief Broadway run in 1899.

The work's competition in London in 1898 included the long-running musicals A Runaway Girl and The Belle of New York.

== Background ==
Tempest as Maia

The simple plot of the production was based around the tangled love lives and misunderstandings of a Roman household. The same themes and characterisations would resurface some 70 years later in the Broadway show A Funny Thing Happened on the Way to the Forum by Stephen Sondheim.

A Greek Slave was in the unfortunate position of following The Geisha, also by Sidney Jones. This was the biggest stage hit of its era. Therefore, A Greek Slave is often remembered as being the show that was not as successful as The Geisha, rather than being appreciated on its own merits. Critics have stated that this show has Jones's best score, with additional hit songs by Monckton, noting that the tunes are catchy, and while the lyrics are witty they also show an appreciation of the classical mythology of the set time period.

In 1899 Fred C. Whitney's Broadway production with Dorothy Morton as Maia, Richard Carle as Heliodorus and Herbert Sparling as Pomponius ran at the Herald Square Theatre for 29 performances.

James White, the owner of Daly's Theatre in London revived A Greek Slave in 1926 with a British tour, starring José Collins as Maia, with the intention of running the production at Daly's. However, the production was fraught with problems, and the London dates were cancelled.

== Roles and original cast ==
Barrington as Marcus Pomponius

Letty Lind as Iris

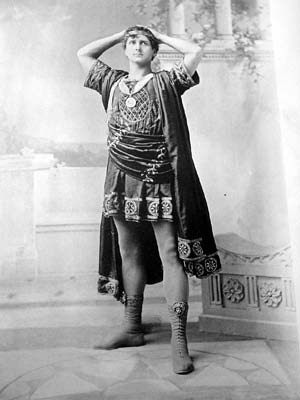
Hayden Coffin as Diomed

Huntley Wright as Heliodorus

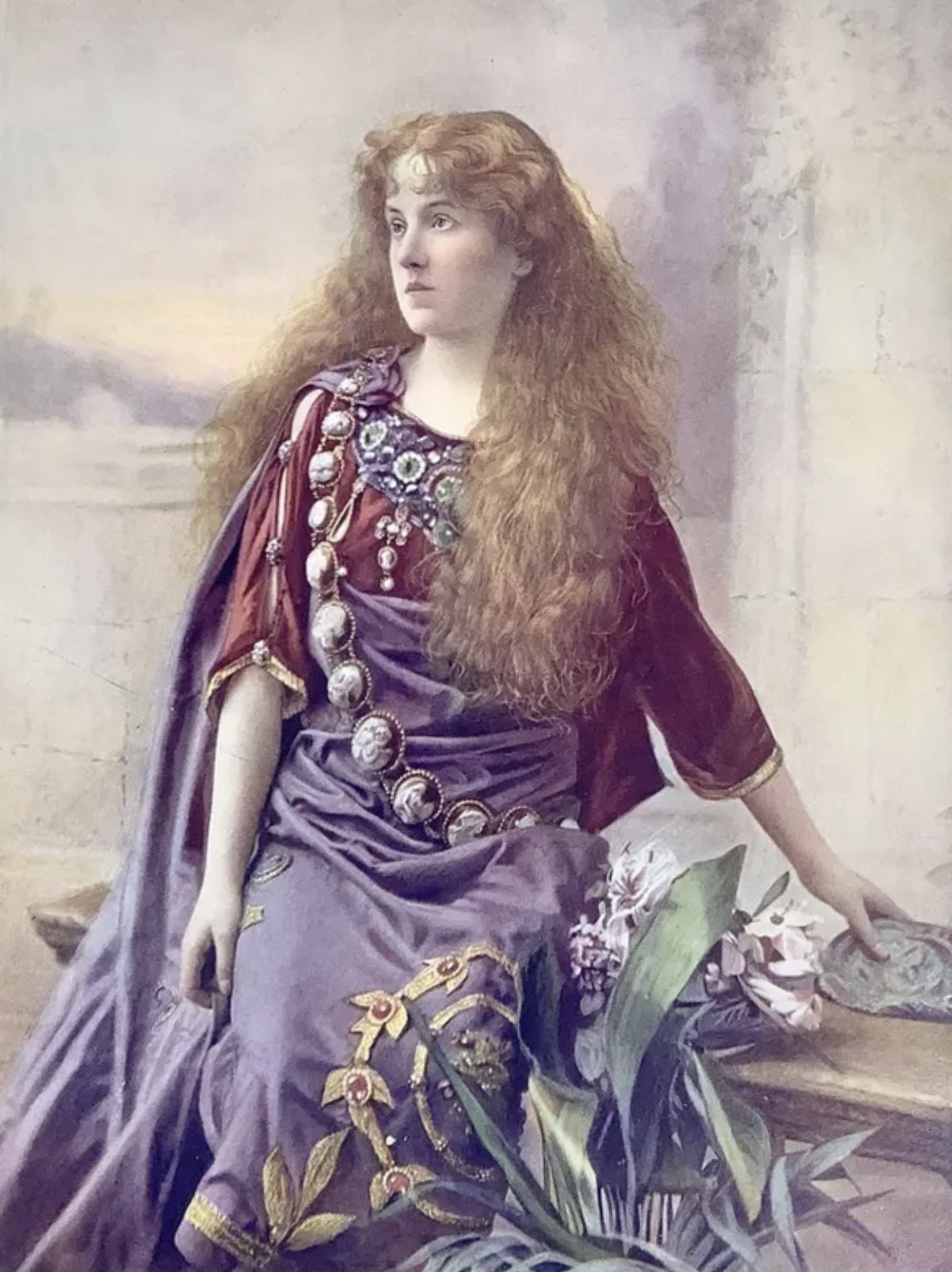
Hilda Moody as Antonia

- Maia (daughter of Heliodorus) – Marie Tempest
- Antonia (a relative of Cæsar) – Hilda Moody
- Melanopis, Circe, Nepia (slaves) – Gladys Homfrey, Magie May, Elisabeth Kirby
- Lucinia, Flavia, Tullia, Cornelia (patricians) – Elise Cook, Olive Morrell, Margaret Ruby, Alice Davis
- Nysa – Miss F. Jamieson
- Iris (a Greek slave, confidential maid of Antonia) – Letty Lind
- Diomed (a Greek slave in Heliodorus' household) – C. Hayden Coffin
- Heliodorus (a Persian soothsayer) – Huntley Wright
- Archias (a Greek slave, sculptor in Heliodorus' household) – Scott Russell
- Manlius, Lollius, Curius, Silius (patricians) – Charles Magrath, Frank Boor, Donald Hall, Akerman May
- Marcus Pomponius (Prefect of Rome) – Rutland Barrington

== Synopsis ==
Heliodorus, a Persian soothsayer, looks into the future love lives of his wealthy matrons of Imperial Rome. His daughter Maia pretends to have the gifts of an oracle, and utters incomprehensible prophecies at a suitable price. Among their servants is one Archias, a talented sculptor, whose most recent achievement is a statue of Eros, God of Love, for which his fellow slave Diomed has acted as model. Maia has fallen in love with Diomed. The princess Antonia comes to the soothsayer in disguise and Maia, egged on by the Prefect Pomponius, who has been spurned by the princess, plans a humiliating trick. She announces to the princess that the God of Love has fallen in love with her. The statue is brought forth, and Heliodorus prepares to 'bring it to life'. Diomed is substituted and serenades the princess.

But Heliodorus is planning a double-cross. He disapproves of his daughter's fancy for a slave, and when the seance is over and Maia has intended that Antonia should walk off with the statue, Heliodorus arranges that the real Diomed falls to the princess. But it does her little good. The slave, in his luxurious new surroundings, pines for Maia, and Antonia's love-making goes for nothing. Pomponius, who was anxious to see his marble lady wasting her affection on a marble statue, is furious at the social slight involved, and Heliodorus finds himself in hot water. Eventually, in the middle of the Roman Saturnalia, all is cleared up, and the correct pairs of lovers are united.

== Musical numbers ==
Act I

- No. 1. On the Dial—Chorus of Slaves
- No. 2. The Wizard—Heliodorus and Chorus of Slaves
- No. 3. By Bacchus! -- Silius, Lollius, Curius, Manlius, Chorus of Slaves
- No. 4. Confidential—Iris with Curius, Silius, Lollius, Manlius and Chorus of Slaves
- No. 5. Freedom—Diomed (words by Henry Hamilton)
- No. 6. Oracle Scene—Maia, Roman Ladies, Licinia, Flavia, Tullia, Cornellia and Chorus of Slaves
- No. 7. The Lost Pleiad—Maia with Heliodorus and Marcus Pomponius
- No. 8. All Is Fair—Maia and Diomed
- No. 9. I Cannot Love—Antonia
- No. 10. I Should Rather Like to Try—Iris (music by Lionel Monckton)
- No. 11. Whirligig—Marcus Pomponius, Iris, Heliodorus
- No. 12. Processional March and Chorus of Welcome—Chorus of Slaves
- No. 13. Invocation—Maia, Antonia, Diomed, Chorus of Slaves
- No. 14. Finale: Bear the God of Love Along—Maia, Heliodorus, Chorus of Slaves

Act II

- No. 15. Here at Baiae On The Bay—Chorus
- No. 16. A Song of Love—Antonia
- No. 17. Oh, What Will Be The End Of It?—Iris and Heliodorus (music by Lionel Monckton)
- No. 18. The Golden Isle—Maia
- No. 19. Topsy-Turvy—Lucinia, Flavia, Manlius, Archias and Others
- No. 20. Chorus of Saturnalia—Chorus of Slaves
- No. 21. The Revels—Archias and Chorus of Slaves
- No. 22. The Girl of My Heart—Diomed and Chorus
- No. 23. I Want to Be Popular—Marcus and Chorus (music by Lionel Monckton)
- No. 24. I'm A Naughty Girl—Iris and Chorus (music by Lionel Monckton)
- No. 25. A Frog He Lived In a Pond—Iris and Chorus
- No. 26. Nothing But Nerves—Heliodorus
- No. 27. Forgive—Maia, Diomed and Chorus
- No. 28. Finale: Hail Antonia, Hail!
