= The Merveilleuses =

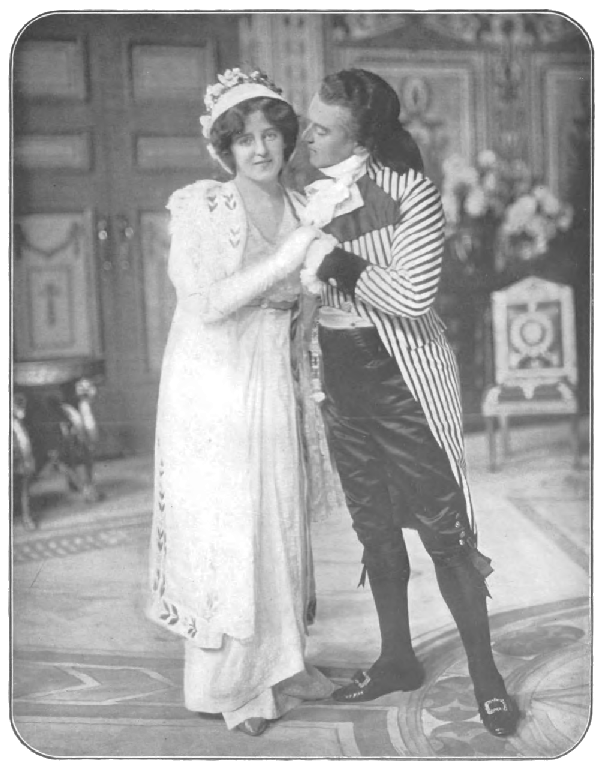
- Denise Orme as Illyrine and Robert Evett as Dorlis
- Music: Hugo Felix
- Lyrics: Adrian Ross
- Book: Victorien Sardou, adapted by Basil Hood
- Productions: 1906 West End

The Merveilleuses is a musical play in three acts, with a book adapted from the French original of Victorien Sardou by Basil Hood, lyrics by Adrian Ross, and music by Hugo Felix. The main plot is a love story, concerning Dorlis, an émigré aristocrat who has just returned from enforced military service in Italy, and Illyrine, his ex-wife. The English title was sometimes rendered as The Lady Dandies.

It opened at Daly's Theatre, London, under the management of George Edwardes, on 27 October 1906, with a cast that included Evie Greene, Denise Orme and Robert Evett in the leading roles, and ran for 196 performances.

== Plot synopsis ==
The story is set in Revolutionary France in the closing years of the 18th century, during the period when the Directoire, led by Barras, held power. Fashionable Parisian society is led by the Incroyables, or dandies, and their feminine equivalents, the Merveilleuses. The latter have adopted classical robes as their form of dress and the succouring of distressed conspirators as their mission.

Act I — The Tent of the Café du Caveau in the Palais Royal Gardens

Illyrine, who had been led to believe that Dorlis had deserted her and had divorced him in consequence, has just been married to a second husband, St. Amour, the rich but low-bred secretary to Barras. Dorlis intrudes on the wedding party at the Café du Caveau and demands that Illyrine return to him. She explains what had happened and tells him that she still loves him.

Act II — The Stock Market; St. Amour's Town House

After a visit to the stock market on the Perron at the Palais Royal, Dorlis, accompanied by his friend Lagorille, one of the Incroyables, goes to the wedding reception at St. Amour's Town House determined to kill St. Amour. However, the latter is warned by police agents, who have learned of the plot. Illyrine hides Dorlis in her private apartment, but St. Amour forces him to reveal his whereabouts by giving a false alarm of "Fire!", whereupon Dorlis and Lagorille are arrested.

Act III — Tricolour Fête at the Palais of the Luxembourg

At a fete given by Barras, Illyrine manages to persuade Barras to pardon Dorlis, with whom, after divorcing St. Amour, she is re-united. Meanwhile, the Merveilleuses, led by Lodoiska, succeed in freeing Lagorille, only to see him carried off by Pervenche.

== Roles and original cast ==
- Dorlis, a refugee aristocrat – Robert Evett
- Lagorille, The Incroyable – W. Louis Bradfield
- St. Amour, secretary to the Director Barras – W. H. Berry
- Malicorne, police agent of Barras – Fred Kaye
- Des Gouttières, secretary to the Directors – Willie Warde
- Tournesol, police agent of the Director Carnot – Fred Emney
- Alexis, head waiter at the Café du Caveau – Scott Russell
- Melval and Valcourt, each a dandy – V. O'Connor and Gordon Cleather
- Ragot, a contractor – A. J. Evelyn
- Gifflart, a Jacobin – J. Murphy
- An officer – J. Boddy
- Pervenche, Ragot's daughter – Mariette Sully
- Illyrine, Ragot's niece – Denise Orme
- Liane – Elizabeth Firth
- Églé, wife of Des Gouttières – M. Perceval
- Dioné, Amaranthe, Aurélie, Cléopatre and Pandore, each a Merveilleuse – Eleanor Souray, Nina Sevening, D. Dunbar, M. Erskine and E. Barker
- Lodoiska, La Merveilleuse – Evie Greene

== Musical numbers ==
- "How I Took the Redoubt" – Dorlis
- "I'm Sorry" – Illyrine
- "Cuckoo" – Illyrine
- "The Gay Director" – Illyrine
- "It Might Have Been" – Dorlis and Illyrine
- "Gina, Mina, Nina, Fina" – Pervenche
- "Our Picnic" – Pervenche
- "Watch-winding" – Liane
- "Illyrine" – Dorlis
- "The Merveilleuse Brigade" – Lagorille
- "An Authoritative Source" – St. Amour
- "Not So Silly As I Look" – St. Amour
- "Les Merveilleuses" – Lodoiska
- "Ring-a-Ring-a-Roses" – Lodoiska

== Critical reception ==
Reviews of the show were generally positive. The Times opened: "There is plenty of life in Les Merveilleuses yet. A feeble comedy, it makes good material for a comic opera; and by that honourable title the piece produced at Daly's on Saturday may justly be called." It was "a well-made, well-mounted comic opera, empty of wit but full of movement and fun, with a bright plot that runs right through without a break, and plenty of amusing and extravagant people." Of the performers, "Mr W H Berry, who took up the part at very short notice [he replaced George Graves, who was ill], did wonders with it. ... His picture of a coward is capital. Mr Bradfield wears something of the real 'Incroyable' air, and Mr Evett is an admirable singer for this kind of work. Miss Evie Greene ... makes the most of her fine voice; Miss Denise Orme keeps hers in strict control ... but the actress who was most in the spirit of the thing was Miss Mariette Sully". If The Times saw a fault, it was in Hugo Felix's music: "As a rule, his music strikes us as clever rather than original. The source of several of his tunes is pretty obvious, but his treatment and his use of his orchestra are fresh, and, if he does not aim very high, he achieves surely and neatly what he wishes."

The Play Pictorial noted that the name of the show had created some difficulty: "'The Women Dandies' scarcely expresses it, and so it was decided eventually to let the French name stand." On the production, it concluded: "The chorus sang well and showed an exceptional amount of life and animation, and for this and for the production generally, Mr J A E Malone is to be heartily congratulated on the successful accomplishment of an arduous task."
