= The Sleeping Beauty and the Beast =

1901 musical

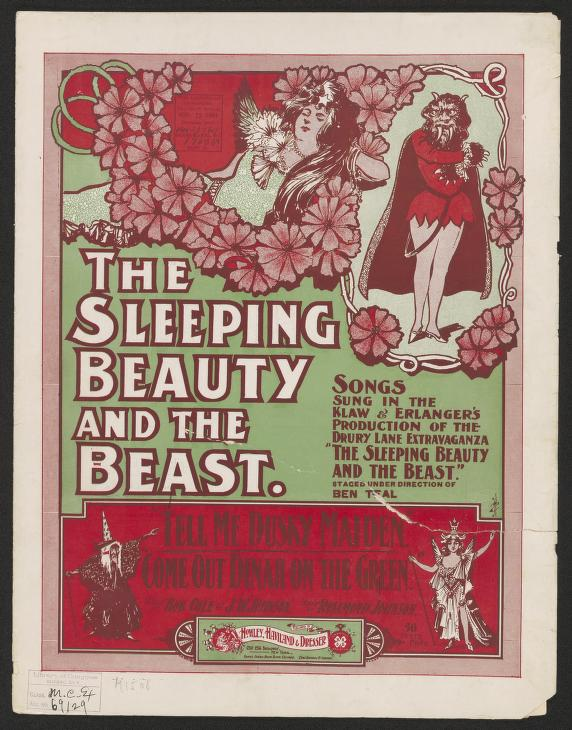
Front cover of sheet music for the song "Tell Me Dusky Maiden" by Cole, Johnson, & Johnson from The Sleeping Beauty and the Beast

The Sleeping Beauty and the Beast is a musical in three acts with music by J. M. Glover and Frederick Solomon and lyrics by J. Cheever Goodwin. Its book by John J. McNally and Goodwin was adapted from the Theatre Royal, Drury Lane's 1900 pantomime of the same name by J. Hickory Wood and Arthur Collins. The musical also included additional music and lyrics by the songwriting team of Jean Schwartz and William Jerome, and by the African-American creative team of Bob Cole, James Weldon Johnson, and J. Rosamond Johnson.

== Plot ==
Malevolentia uses her magic to curse the Princess Beauty into a sleep that lasts 100 years. Prince Charming goes in search of the princess, finds her, and wakes her with a kiss. All seems right, and the pair plan a wedding to unite their two kingdoms. At the wedding, Malevolentia ruins the day by turning the prince into a beast. Ultimately, everything is set right when the princess gives the beast true love's kiss which breaks the spell and he magically transforms back into the prince. The happy couple marry.

== History ==
Based on the "Sleeping Beauty" and "Beauty and the Beast" fairytales, The Sleeping Beauty and the Beast premiered at the Broadway Theatre on 41st St in Manhattan on November 4, 1901. A popular success, it ran for 241 performances, closing on May 31, 1902. The production was staged by Ben Teal and starred Ella Snyder as Princess Beauty, Phoebe Coyne as the wicked witch Malevolentia, Viola Gillette in the trouser role of Prince Charming, Nellie Thorne as the fairy queen Benovelentia, John Hymans as Doctor Squills, and Nora Cecil as Algie. The cast also included dancers Annabelle Moore and Elseeta, and sisters Florence Hengler (Flossie) and May Hengler (Lord Jocelyn). It was one of several Drury Lane pantomimes adapted into Broadway musicals by producers Klaw and Erlanger with the composer Frederick Solomon.

Critics of the work, some of whom had seen the Theatre Royal, Drury Lane production, complained about the Americanization of the pantomime, with the Baltimore Sun critic writing "Drury Lane it was, and Drury Lane it was not." Several reviewers specifically critiqued the addition of American style musical comedy characters and "Broadway humor"; including the parts of King Bardout (Harry Bulger) and President Platt (John Page), and the drag roles of Queen Spadia (Charles J. Ross) and Lena the nurse (Joseph Cawthorn).

The visual aspects of The Sleeping Beauty and the Beast were universally praised. The sets were designed by Julian Hicks, R.C. McCleary, R. Caney, H. Emden and Bruce Smith; and the costumes were designed by Attilio Comelli and F. Richard Anderson. The set for the 'Enchanted Crystal Garden' included 33,000 pieces of Venetian glass which were illuminated by 2,000 electric lights that were presented in the midst of multiple fountains that were lit with changing colors. The New York Times critic described it as "a spectacle of extreme brilliancy" that made "an extraordinarily beautiful effect. That critic was also highly complimentary of the song "Tell Me Dusky Maiden" by Cole, Johnson, & Johnson; writing that it was "a peculiarly effective specialty". Schwartz and Jerome contributed the cynical lullaby "Nursery Rhymes" which modified traditional nursery rhyme texts with witty topical commentary.
