= Elseeta =

Elseeta, the Dancing Marvel
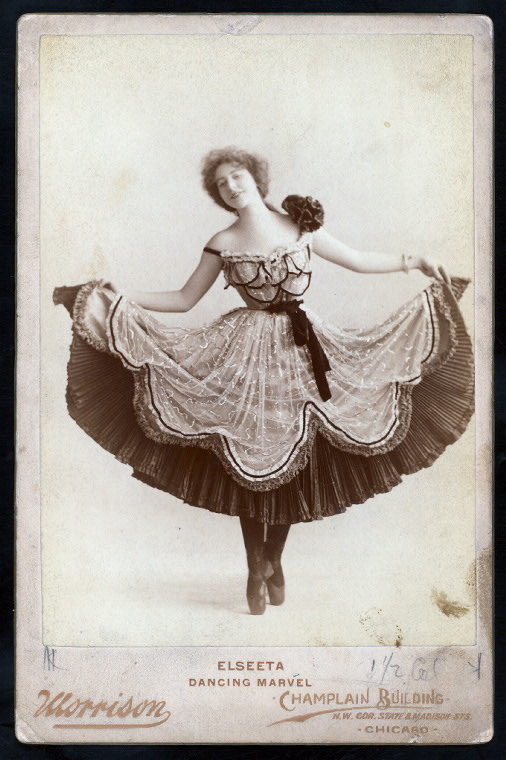
- Born: Helen Loder; 1883; Philadelphia, Pennsylvania
- Died: February 23, 1903 (aged 19–20); New York
- Occupation: vaudeville dancer

Elseeta or Elcita was the stage name of Helen Loder Jones (1883-1903), an American vaudeville barefoot toe dancer. Known as 'the Dancing Marvel', or the 'Toe Dancing Marvel', Elseeta was "a rising star on the circuit at the dawn of the 20th century".

== Life ==
Helen Loder Jones was born in Philadelphia in 1883. She took up toe dancing at the age of five, making a debut in vaudeville. She went on to perform for the Keith-Albee-Orpheum circuit and in Klaw and Erlanger productions in New York. She danced on roof-garden circuits, appearing at Madison Square Gardens and the Casino Theatre roof-garden. She danced barefoot. One of her acts involved jumping from the top of a grand piano, managing to land en pointe on the piano's high and middle C.

Fred S. Stone composed a 1900 ragtime number 'Elseeta' in her honour. There is also an image of her on the cover of L. W. Young's 1900 march / two-step 'Hearts are Trumps'.

Elseeta's last performance, before heart problems stalled her career, was in the 1901 Broadway performance of The Sleeping Beauty and the Beast. She died on February 23, 1903, at the house of Mrs. Henry Huey, 3 Eighth Avenue, New York. (Another source gives her place of death as Newark, New Jersey.) Her cause of death was said to be "heart disease, superinduced by excessive dancing".
