= Hugo Felix =

Austrian composer

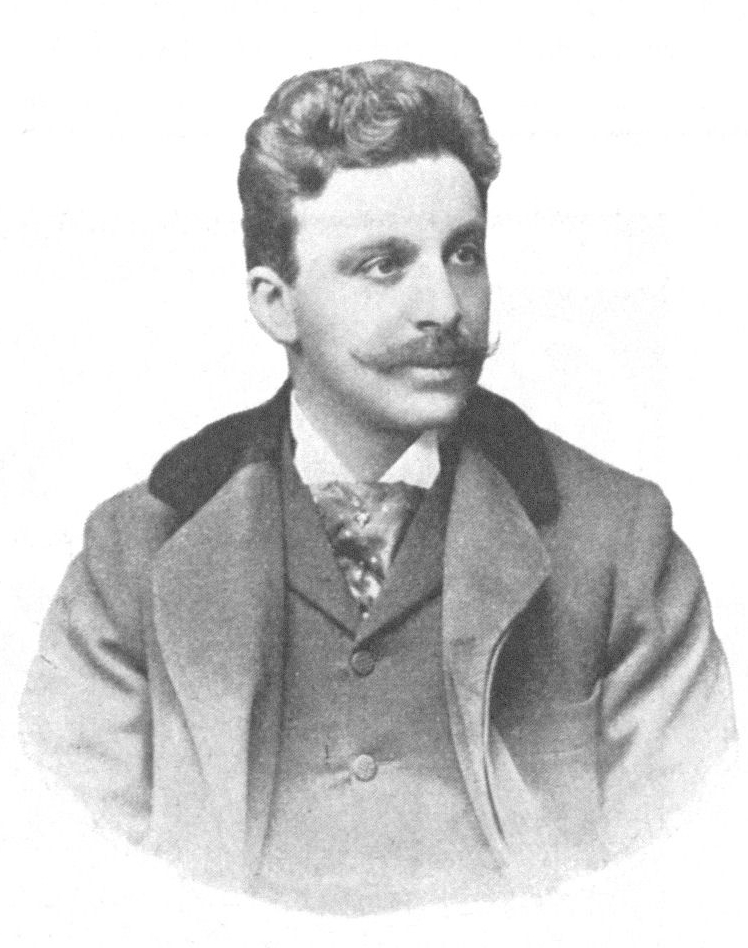
Felix in 1900

Hugo Victor Felix (19 November 1866 – 25 August 1934), born Felix Hugo Hayman, was an Austrian composer of operettas and musicals.

== Life ==
Felix was born on 19 November 1866 in Budapest, Austrian Empire. Felix's parents were and Hungarian-Austrian merchant, Mori[t]z Hayman (died 1896) and a Slovak-Austrian mother, Eugenie Bachrich (died 1908). He was educated in Vienna, graduated from Vienna University with a Doctorate in Science, but decided to pursue music instead of chemistry.

His first operetta was Die Kätzchen, first produced in Lemberg in 1890 and in Vienna in 1892. His other works included Husarenblut (1894, Vienna), Rhodope (1900, Vienna and Berlin), Madame Sherry (1902, Berlin – his biggest success) and The Merveilleuses (1906, London). As music director of musical director of the Carltheater in Vienna from the late 1890s to 1906, he imported several British works to Vienna, adapting both librettos and scores. He also contributed interpolated numbers to several musical comedies such as "Sancho Panza" by Melchior Lengyel (1880-1974)

Felix later went to the US where Madame Sherry met with success, in 1912, and composed several more shows. He remained in the US for the remainder of his life and died in Los Angeles, California, aged sixty-seven.

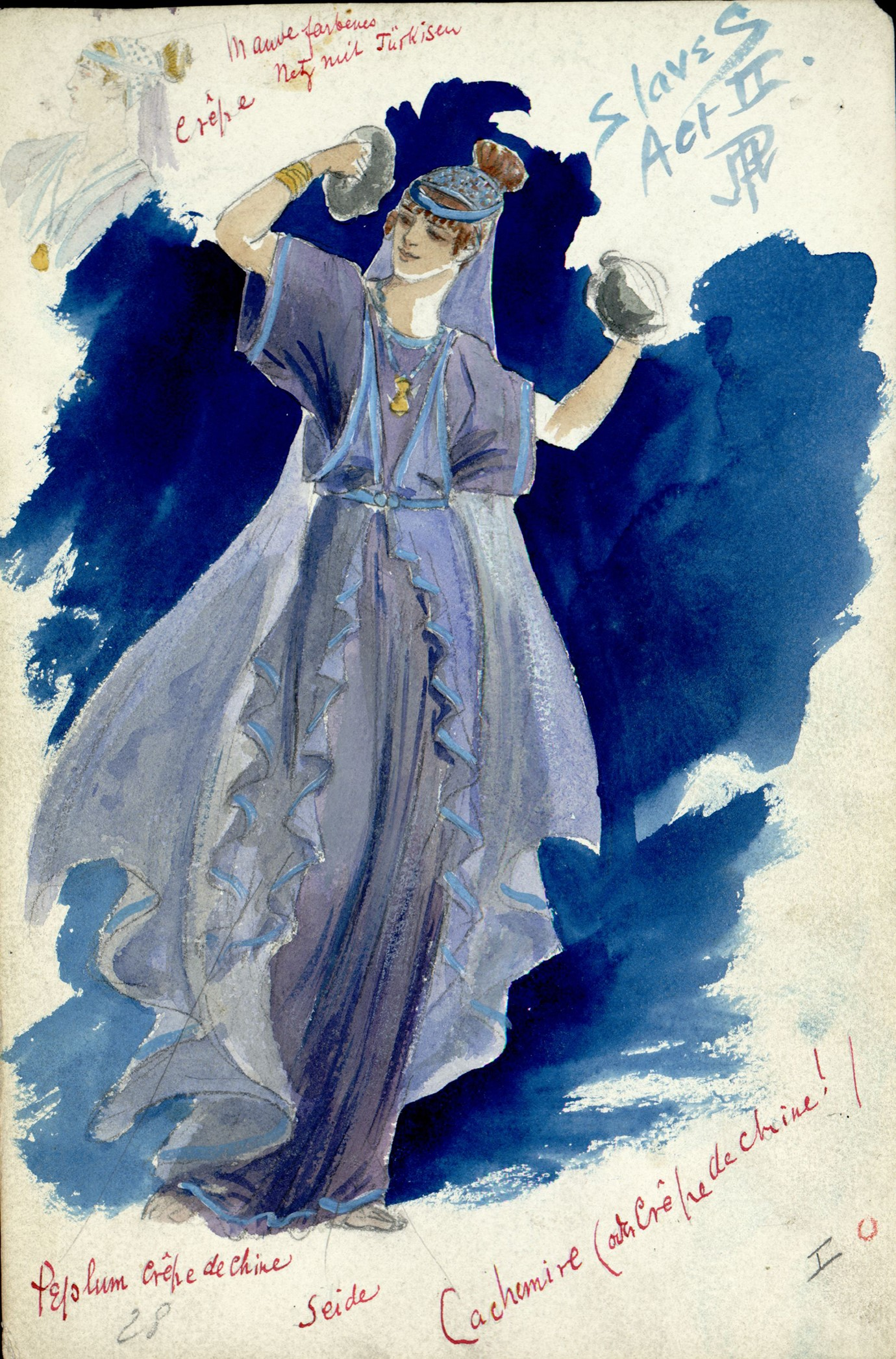
Slave, costume design for Schiavo di Corinto act 2 (undated)
