= Dudley Glass =

Dudley Jack Glass (24 September 1899 – 29 November 1981) was an Australian-born composer, pianist and writer. He is best known for composing musicals and light operas, including The Beloved Vagabond and The Toymaker of Nuremberg.

Glass was born in Melbourne Street, North Adelaide, a son of Phillip Glass (c. 1878 – June 1966) of Adelaide, manager of Barnet Glass Rubber Company and local manager of Dunlop Rubber after its takeover. His mother, Jean Glass, née Barnett, was a classically trained musician.
