= Eleanor Souray =

English actress

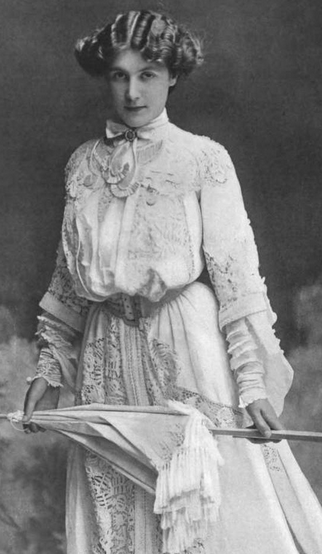
Eleanor Souray, from a 1904 publication.

Eleanor "Nellie" Souray (1880 – 8 December 1931), later styled as Eleanor Byng, Viscountess Torrington, was an English actress known for her roles in Edwardian musical comedies, pantomime and light opera.

== Early life ==
Souray was born Ellen Mary Souray (or Sowray) at Long Ditton, one of eight children of Edwin Souray and Mary Ann (or Marion) Husted Souray. Her sister Maidie Souray was also an actress.

== Career ==
Souray was a comic actress and singer, preferring the range of shows "from pantomime to light comedy". She appeared in The Black Tulip (1898), The Girl from Kays (1902), The Duchess of Dantzic (1903), The Blue Moon (1905), The Merveilleuses (1906), The Admirable Crichton, and Letty. She was also associated with the Gaiety Theatre.

She wrote Over the Garden Wall: A Story of Racing and Romance, published in 1924.

== Personal life ==
In 1910, Souray married George Master Byng, the 9th Viscount Torrington, at the British Embassy in Paris; they met three days earlier, through their mutual interest in horse racing. They were married about four years when the viscount was commissioned to serve in the Royal Navy during World War I. They separated after the war; he declared bankruptcy in 1919, and they were divorced in 1921. She was later romantically linked with jockey and trainer Steve Donoghue.

Souray became more involved with horse racing in her later years, an expensive hobby, which led to her own bankruptcy in 1930. She died by suicide in 1931, in London, at the age of 51.
