= Nancy Brown (musical) =

Musical with music by Henry Kimball Hadley

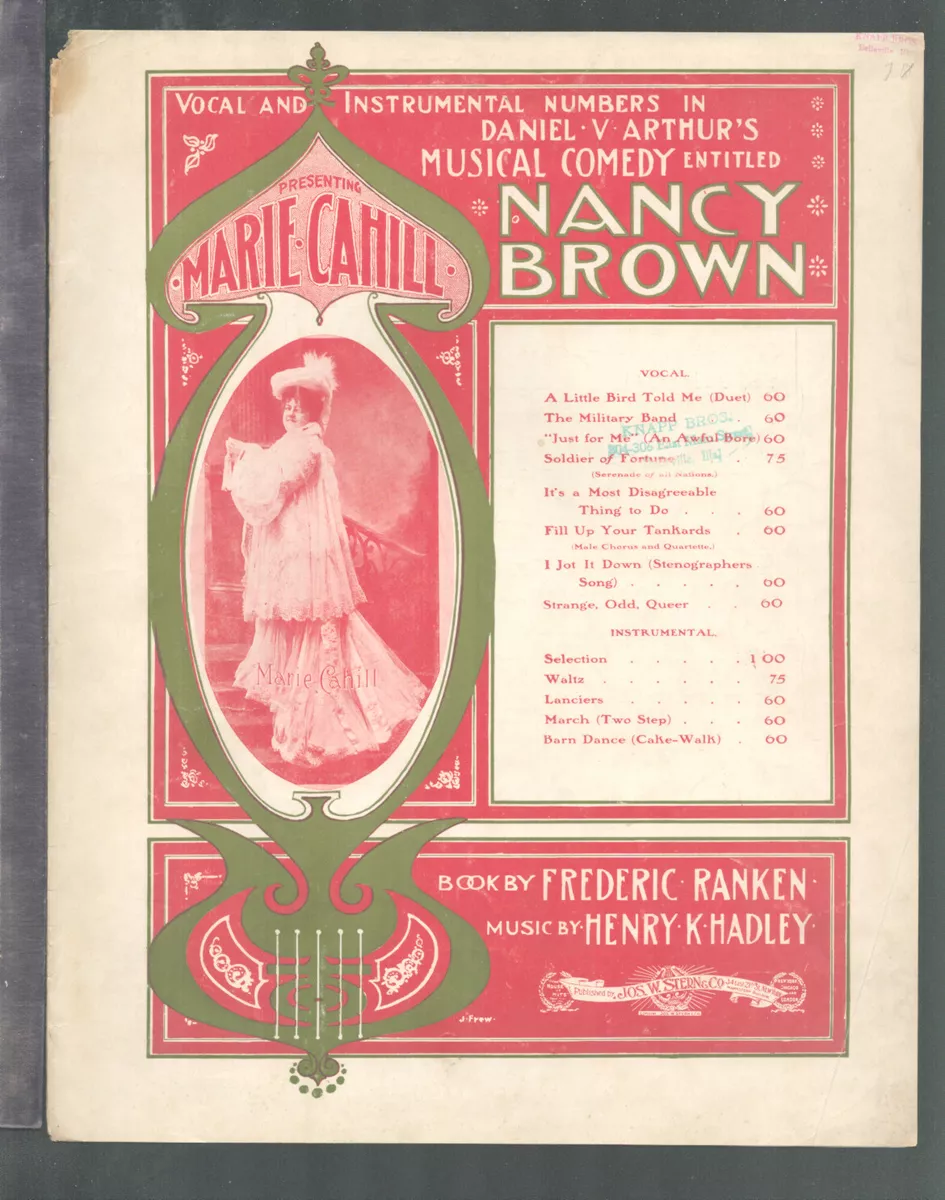
Front cover of the sheet music for Nancy Brown.

Nancy Brown is a musical in two acts with music by Henry Kimball Hadley and both book and lyrics by George Broadhurst and Frederic Ranken. The musical also used several songs written by the African-American songwriting team of Robert Cole, J. Rosamond Johnson, and James Weldon Johnson. Set in the royal palace of the fictional kingdom of Ballyhoo, the show was about the matchmaker Nancy Brown's attempt to wed the Ballyhooian royalty and nobility to eight wealthy American heiresses in order to save the financially bankrupt kingdom.

== History ==
Nancy Brown was created as a starring vehicle for Marie Cahill who portrayed the title role. The name of the character was taken from the song "Nancy Brown" by Clifton Crawford which Cahill sang in the musical The Wild Rose, and which was interpolated into this musical. Cahill also performed another interpolated song, the popular hit "Under the Bamboo Tree" by Robert Cole, J. Rosamond Johnson, and James Weldon Johnson, which she had sung previously in Sally in Our Alley. A new song was written for her for this show by Cole, Johnson & Johnson which attempted to recapture a similar aesthetic to the prior tune, "The Congo Love Song". The show's new hit song, "Two Eyes" also by Cole, Johnson, and Johnson, was sung by the actor Madison Smith (as Hullybaloo) who made his Broadway debut in this production. Other song by this trio of songwriters in Nancy Brown included "Magdaline, My Southern Queen", "My Mississippi Belle", "Save It for Me", "Octette to Bacchus", and "The Soldier is the Idol of the Nation". These songs were published by Joseph W. Stern.

Nancy Brown premiered on Broadway at the Bijou Theatre on February 16, 1903, where it ran for a total of 104 performances; (Note: IBDB reports the performance count on Broadway as 112 performances. This number was arrived at by adding the 104 performances at the Bijou Theatre to a later return engagement at Broadway's Grand Opera House in October–November 1903 when eight further performances were given; making a total of 112 performances of the work given in Broadway theaters collectively.) closing on May 16, 1903. The show then toured nationally, and returned to Broadway for 8 more performances at the Grand Opera House which began on October 26, 1903. The production was directed by Frank Smithson and produced by Daniel V. Arthur. It used sets designed by Gates and Morange and costumes by Caroline Seidle.

In addition to Cahill and Madison Smith, the cast also included Edwin Stevens as Muley Mustapha, a.k.a. "The Bey of Ballyhoo", Judith Berolde as The Princess Barboo, Albert Parr as Mara Mustapha, Harry Brown as Socrates Finis, Al Grant as Noah Little, Alfred Hickman as Venderhyphen Jenks, John Havens as Lord Worcestershire, George Beban as Count Fromage de Brie, Henry Vogel as Baron Sauerbraten, Frank Dearduff as The Grand Duke of Drinkamutchsky, Jean Newcombe as Mrs. John Jenks, Edythe Moyer as Alice, Ruby Paine as Gracie, Maud Francis as Gwendolyn, Lita Castello as Zuzu, Grace Cameron as Muriel, Helen Curzon as Rena, Leslie Mayo as Sally, Helen Lathrop as Tulu, Alice Knowlton as Tutu, Aline Boyd as Nara, Adele Archer as Maud, and Maud Sloane as Sadie.
