= Hit song =

Recorded song that becomes popular or commercially successful

A hit song, also known as a hit record, hit single, or simply hit, is a recorded song or instrumental that becomes broadly popular or well-known. Although hit song means any widely played or big-selling song, the specific term hit record usually refers to a single that has appeared in an official music chart through repeated radio airplay audience impressions or significant streaming data and commercial sales.

Prior to the dominance of recorded music, commercial sheet music sales of individual songs were similarly promoted and tracked as singles and albums are now. For example, in 1894, Edward B. Marks and Joe Stern released The Little Lost Child, which sold more than a million copies nationwide, based mainly on its success as an illustrated song, analogous to what later became music videos.

== Chart hits ==
In the United States and the United Kingdom, a single is usually considered a hit when it reaches the top 40 of the Billboard Hot 100 or the top 75 of the UK Singles Chart. The Guinness Book of British Hit Singles has used this definition since the 1970s. Some argue that reaching at least the top 100—since the Official Charts Company increased the chart size on their website on 23 June 2007—lets a single be considered a hit due to the increasing singles market after chart rules included download singles. In most cases, the amount of weeks spent on either music chart may also play a big part in its relevance as a 'hit', regardless of its peak chart position.

A hit single is variously called a number one hit, a top 5 hit, a top 10 hit, a top 20 hit, or a top 40 hit, depending on its peak position. In the UK (where radio play is not included in the official charts), this does not completely reflect the song's popularity—as the weekly chart position is based solely on direct comparison with concurrent sales of other singles. It is, therefore, not uncommon that a single fails to chart, but has actually sold more copies than other singles regarded as "hits" based on their higher chart placement in a period of low sales. (This is also possible in the United States—or anywhere—with slow but steady sellers; a number of minor hits, especially those that are popular in specific genre, have earned gold certifications despite relatively poor pop chart performances.)

== Sales figures ==
In the UK, the number of sales required to achieve a hit single steadily declined in line with a general decline in single sales until the early 2000s. The number has, however, recovered strongly with growth in official digital downloads. 2011 was a record year for UK singles sales. Actual figures vary considerably depending on the time of year. In 2010 a number one single usually sold around 100,000 copies per week; sales of around 30,000 were often sufficient to reach the top 10, and a single selling over 6,000 copies could make the top 40.

== Albums of hit singles ==
Record companies often release collections of hit singles by various artists as compilation albums, such as the Now That's What I Call Music! series. Well-known bands and artists also frequently release collections of their most popular singles as Greatest hits albums.

== See also ==
- List of best-selling singles
- Record chart
- Sleeper hit
