= Arthur Stanford =

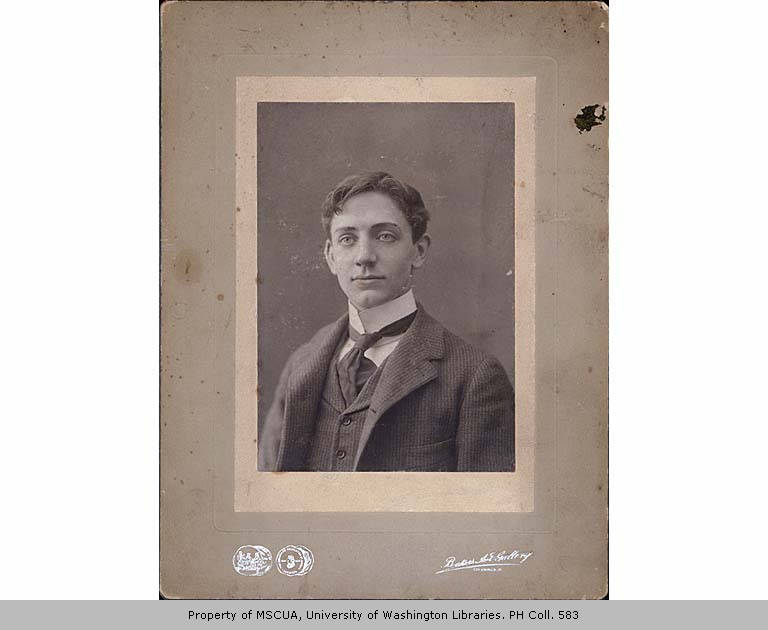
- Arthur Stanford 1897
- Born: August 24, 1878; Philadelphia, Pennsylvania
- Died: July 21, 1917 (aged 38); New Bedford, Massachusetts
- Occupations: Actor; Singer
- Years active: 1899-1917

Arthur Stanford (1878–1917) was an American stage actor and singer. He performed mainly in several Broadway comedies and musicals. He was in the cast of the musical Mam'zelle Champagne the night of Stanford White's murder. Stanford appeared in one feature film The Whirl of Life starring Vernon and Irene Castle. The film survives and the New York Public Library has a copy posted online. Stanford died of mastoidal meningitis after an operation in July 1917.

== Partial stage roles ==
- A Greek Slave (1899) (*Broadway version)
- Miss Prinnt (1900) (*with Marie Dressler)
- Mam'zelle Champagne (1906)(*with Maude Fulton)
- The Vanderbilt Cup (1907) (*with Elsie Janis)
- Fascinating Flora
- The Fair Co-ed (1909) (*with Elsie Janis)
- Judy Forgot (1910) (*with Marie Cahill)
- Modest Suzanne (1912)

== Filmography ==
- The Whirl of Life (1915)
