= Sally in Our Alley =

Sally in Our Alley may refer to:

- "Sally in Our Alley" (song), a 1725 song by Henry Carey
- Sally in Our Alley (musical), a 1902 Broadway musical comedy
- Sally in Our Alley (1916 film), a British silent film directed by Laurence Trimble
- Sally in Our Alley (1927 film), an American silent film directed by Walter Lang
- Sally in Our Alley (1931 film), a British film directed by Maurice Elvey
