= Clifton Crawford =

Comedian, composer, performer, and dancer from Scotland

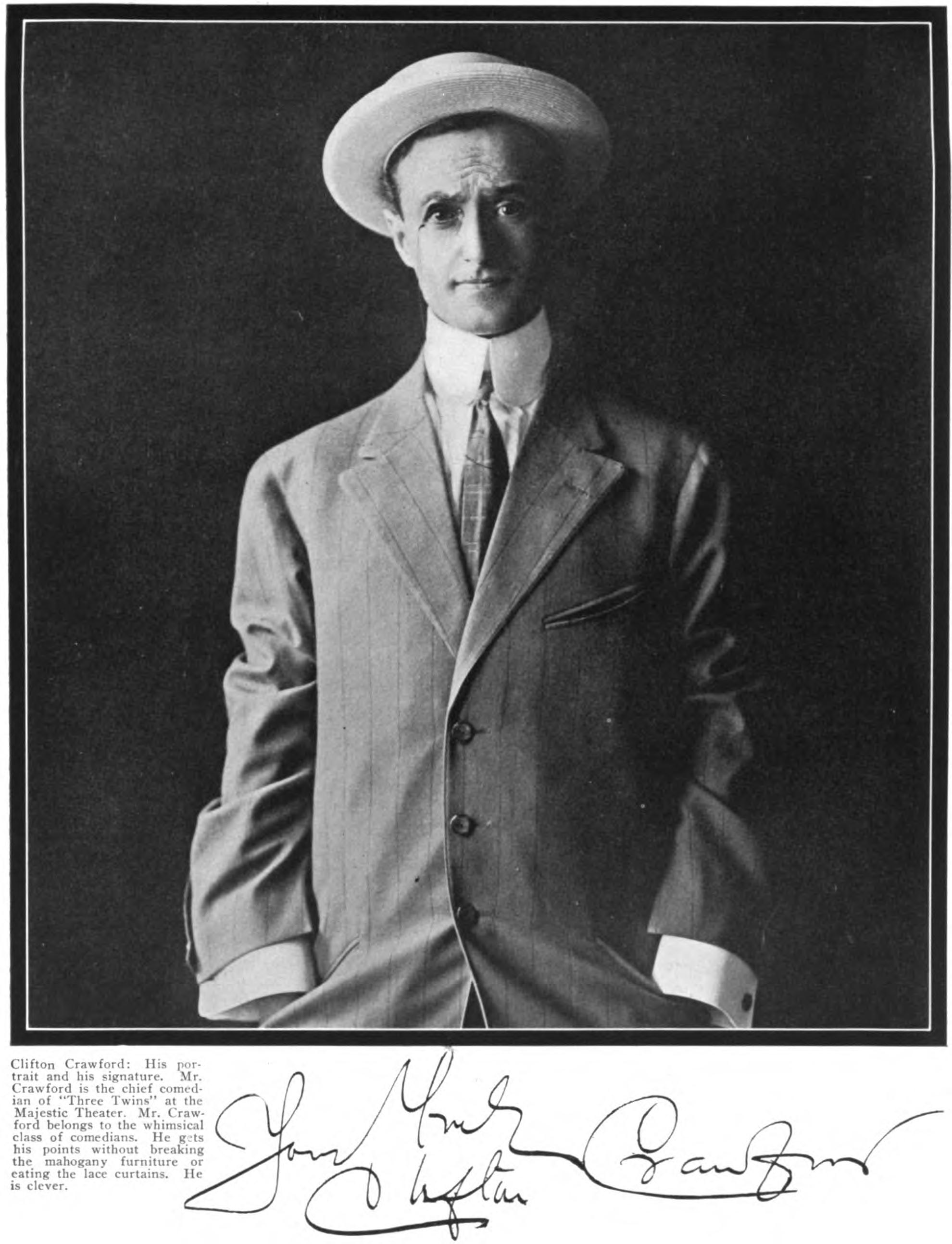

Clifton Crawford (2 April 1875 - 3 June 1920) was a Scottish-born American dancer, singer, musical theatre actor, pianist, lyricist, and composer. Born into a theatrical family in Edinburgh, he began his career on the stage as a child pianist, and then appeared opposite his parents in stage roles in first the United Kingdom and then in tours of South Africa and Australia. The family lived for a period in New Zealand and Australia where Crawford began working as a performer of Highland dance. As a young adult he worked in music halls in the UK and in vaudeville in the United States, but without much success. He became a golf instructor in Boston where he performed in amateur theatricals which brought him to the attention of lyricist Robert Barnet. Barnet reoriented his career to the Broadway stage beginning with the musical My Lady (1901).

Crawford was famous for writing the song "Nancy Brown" (a hit tune for Marie Cahill) and for his performances in the Broadway musicals Mother Goose (1903-1904), Three Twins (1908-1909), The Quaker Girl (1911), and Her Soldier Boy (1916-1917). He was also well known for his recitations of "Gunga Din" by Rudyard Kipling; a poem he first recited in Three Twins and later as a monologist. In addition to writing songs interpolated into several Broadway shows, he was also a co-creator of the musicals Seeing New York (1906), Captain Careless (1906), My Best Girl (1912), and I Love Lassie (1919). His final Broadway stage role was as the lead comic in Frank Mandel's play My Lady Friend (1919-1920) which was later adapted into the musical No, No, Nanette. He died from a fall at the age of 45 while in London on vacation in 1920.

== Early life and career ==
Clifton Crawford was born in Edinburgh, Scotland on 2 April 1875. His father worked as a theatre manager and Clifton began his career on the stage as a child pianist. His parents also worked as actors, and Clifton would perform with them on the stage in various roles such as an angel and in blackface parts singing coon songs. He immigrated with his parents to first New Zealand and then Australia; along the way touring South Africa and Australia in the family acting troupe.

In Australia Crawford began working as a dancer in the Scottish tradition of Highland dance. As a young man he worked as a dancer in music halls in the United Kingdom and in vaudeville in the United States. His initial performances in the U.S. were a failure and he returned to Scotland for a period before returning to the United States a second time. He worked for a period as a golf instructor at the Boston Golf Club. There he participated in amateur theatricals and caught the eye of musical theatre lyricist Robert Barnet who reoriented his career back into performance by hiring Crawford for work with Barnet's theatrical troupe, the Boston Cadets.

Crawford's World War I draft registration card states that he was an American citizen.

== Work in the American theatre ==
In 1901, Crawford appeared with Barnet's Boston Cadets at the Columbia Theatre in Boston as Arra-Miss in Barnet and composer Harry Lawson Heartz's musical Miladi and the Musketeer; a work for which he also wrote the song "Angelina's March" for the actress Merri Osborne. He remained with this production when it reached Broadway's Victoria Theatre, now retitled My Lady, on February 11, 1901.

Crawford contributed songs to Barnet and Heartz's Miss Simplicity (1901, Boston premiere) which was staged at Broadway's Casino Theatre in 1902. He wrote the words and music to two songs interpolated into the Broadway musical The Liberty Belles (1901), "Star Light" and "De Trop". The latter tune, a song and dance duet featuring Harry Davenport and Etta Butler, became a hit. This was followed the following year by the tremendously popular song "Nancy Brown" (words and music by Crawford) which was introduced by Marie Cahill in the 1902 Broadway musical The Wild Rose. That song was the inspiration for the later musical Nancy Brown (1903) which also starred Cahill.

In 1902, Crawford returned to the Broadway stage as Jack Richman in Joseph Hart's musical Foxy Grandpa which ran at Haverly's 14th Street Theatre. Other roles on the New York stage followed in The Jewel of Asia (1903, as Yussuf Potiphar) and Mother Goose (1903-1904, as Mayor of Chatham). He wrote two songs for the latter musical, "Rafferty" and "Social Eclat". With Joseph Hart he wrote the lyrics to the musical Seeing New York (1906) which had a score by A. Baldwin Sloane; also performing in this production as Sir Montiford Knight at the New York Roof, a rooftop garden theatre. With Bob Adams and Robert Melville Baker he created the musical Captain Careless which premiered at the Princess Theatre in Toronto on 27 August 1906 and subsequently ran at the Chicago Opera House in 1907. It also toured the United States for two years in production produced by B.C. Whitney.

Crawford had a major hit as a performer as Tom Stanhop in Three Twins which played at the Herald Square Theatre in 1908 and the Majestic Theatre in 1909. He achieved acclaim for his recitation of Rudyard Kipling's poem "Gunga Din" (performed to music) in this musical, and after this show closed he toured nationally as a monologist with this poem as part of his repertoire. Crawford recorded his version from Three Twins. It was included in the 1993 CD anthology Music from the New York Stage, Volume II: 1908-1913.

Crawford was interviewed by The New York Times in 1911 upon his return to Broadway in The Quaker Girl. It ran at the Park Theatre in 1911-1912 with Crawford in the role of Tony Chute. With Augustus Barratt he co-wrote the score to the Broadway musical My Best Girl which used a book and lyrics co-written by Channing Pollock and Rennold Wolf. It ran for approximately two months at the Park Theatre in 1912 with Crawford in the role of Richard Venderfleet. In 1914, he went to London where he starred in the West End production of After the Girl; performing the part of Freddy Charlston at the Gaiety Theatre, London.

Crawford's song "Mary Had a Lamb" was interpolated into Rudolf Friml's musical The Peasant Girl (originally titled The Ballet Girl), and his song "What's the Matter With You?" was included in The Passing Show of 1916. The Pleasant Girl was staged at the 44th Street Theatre in 1915 with Crawford as Bronio Von Popiel. This show was parodied in The Passing Show of 1915 with actress Marilyn Miller doing a comedic impersonation of Crawford in that show.

After this Crawford performed the role of Tony Van Schuyler in Sigmund Romberg and Harold Atteridge's musical revue A World of Pleasure at the Winter Garden Theatre in 1915-1916. This was followed by another significant role for Crawford, the part of Teddy McLane in Her Soldier Boy, which ran at the Astor Theatre in 1916-1917. He penned the songs "If You're Crazy About the Women" and "Eve" for Augustus Barratt's musical Fancy Free. He also portrayed the part of Albert Van Wyck in this show which ran at several theaters on Broadway (Astor, Casino, and Bijou) in 1918.

Crawford's song "This Is the Time" was interpolated into Ivan Caryll, Irving Berlin, and Harry B. Smith's musical The Canary which ran at the Globe Theatre in 1918-1919. With Jerome K. Jerome and Erwin Connelly he created the musical I Love Lassie which premiered at the Shubert Theatre in New Haven, Connecticut on 15 May 1919. It never made it to Broadway; closing after further performances in Rhode Island. In 1919-1920, he played the role of James Smith in the play My Lady Friends at the Comedy Theatre. It was subsequently adapted into the musical No, No, Nanette.

He died in London on 3 June 1920, falling from the window of the Hotel Picadilly when he was 45 years old.
