= The Whirl of Life =

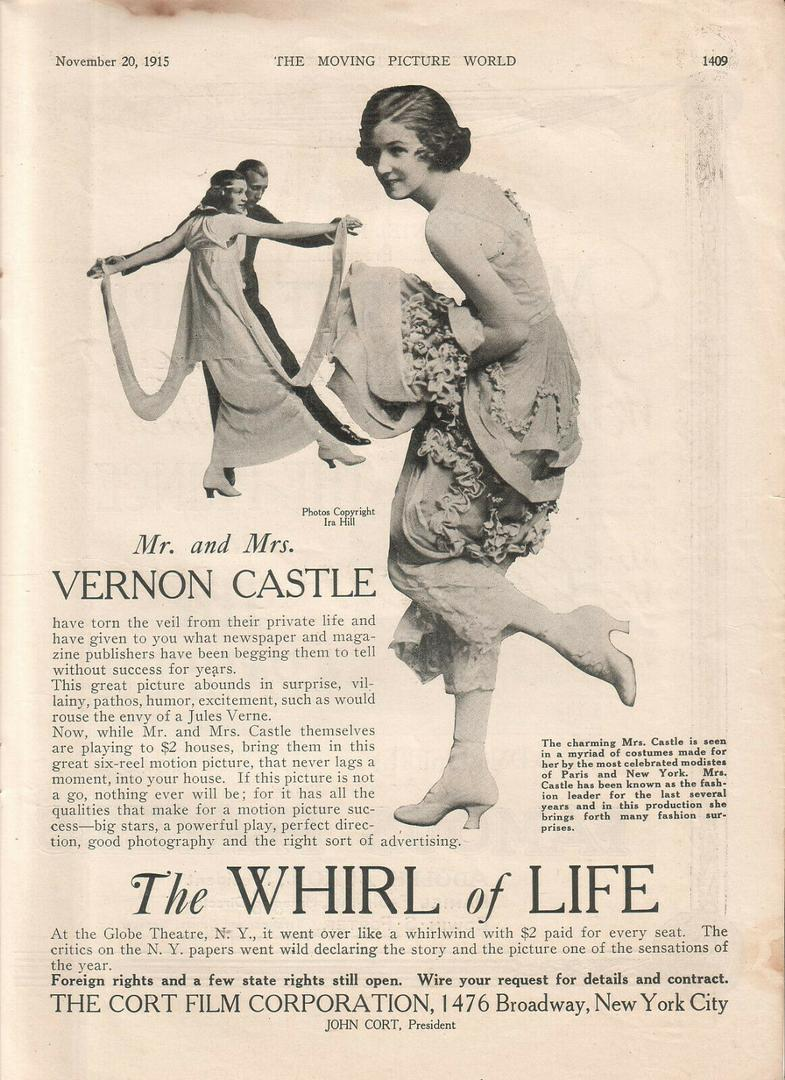
- advert in Moving Picture World
- Directed by: Oliver D. Bailey
- Written by: Vernon Castle; Catherine Carr
- Produced by: John Cort; Gerald F. Bacon
- Starring: Vernon and Irene Castle
- Cinematography: Eugene Cugnet
- Distributed by: States Rights
- Release date: October 1915
- Running time: 6 reels

Full film

The Whirl of Life is a 1915 silent film built around and starring dance couple Vernon and Irene Castle and stage actor Arthur Stanford, his only film. Directed by Oliver D. Bailey, the film was produced by the Cort Film Corporation and distributed on State Rights basis.

Some garments worn by the cast were designed by Titanic survivor Lucile Duff-Gordon.

The film is now in the public domain.

== Cast ==
- Vernon Castle - himself
- Irene Castle - herself
- Arthur Stanford - John Crosby
- Kate Blancke - Mrs. Foote
- William T. Carleton - Mr. Foote (credited as William Carleton, Sr.)
- John Cort - uncredited role
- Edward Cort - The Gangster
- James Reese Europe - himself (uncredited)
- Ruth Gordon - unknown role (uncredited)
