= Sally in Our Alley (musical) =

1902 Broadway musical comedy show

Sally in Our Alley is a 1902 Broadway musical comedy show. It helped Marie Cahill reach stardom and popularized songs. The title refers to the popular saying that developed from the British song "Sally in Our Alley". The show helped popularize the song "Under the Bamboo Tree". George V. Hobart wrote the musical and its song lyrics. Ludwig Engländer wrote the music for the show. Interpolations of songs by J. Rosamond Johnson, George Walker, and Bert Williams were included in the show.

The first performance of the show was delayed a couple days because of a dressing room row that occurred after Irene Bently was assigned a tent rather than a bedroom like Marie Cahill.

The show's chorus was photographed and is in the MCNY collection. The photograph is attributed to the Byron Company.

Songs in the show include "When It's All Goin' out and Nothin' Comin' In" written by Bert Williams and George Walker as well as "Under the Bamboo Tree" by Rosamond Johnson (music) and Bob Cole (lyrics). A gramophone recording of Under the Bamboo Tree was made. Other performers such as vaudeville star Marie Cahill also recorded the song. She also performed as a musical comedienne in the show. It become part of her vaudeville routine. Harry Farleigh performed in the show.

Several Sally in Our Alley films were also made. Grace Fields stars in one of the films. Joseph W. Stern published sheet music for the songs and instrumentals in the show.

== See also ==
- Sally in Our Alley (disambiguation)
