= Oh! Oh! Delphine =

Musical comedy premiered in 1912

Oh! Oh! Delphine is a musical comedy with book and lyrics by C. M. S. McLellan and music by Ivan Caryll. It is based on the French farce Villa Primrose by Marcel Guillemaud and Georges Berr.

A Broadway production opened at the Knickerbocker Theatre on September 30, 1912, and played for 258 performances, directed by Herbert Gresham, choreographed by Julian Mitchell and music directed by Frederick Solomon. It opened in London in 1913 at the Shaftesbury Theatre, and in Australia in 1918.

== Synopsis ==
Setting: The Hotel Beau Rivage in Brest, France

Victor Jolibeau, an artist, searches for a model for the left shoulder of a Venus he is painting. He and Alphonse Bouchotte have exchanged wives by way of the Divorce Court. Delphine leads Alphonse on a merry chase, while Simone bores Victor. The husbands are called to the colours to serve a month with their regiment at Brest. Victor takes with him six models for his Venus, while Delphine accompanies her husband. Victor has kept his divorce from his uncle, who has been supplying him with funds because of his fondness for Delphine. Alphonse, alarmed by the attentions paid to his wife by his colonel, introduces Bimboula, a Persian rug seller, to his wife, and makes Delphine promise that she will remain in her room throughout their stay in Brest.

Victor learns that his uncle is in Brest to let his villa to Fleurette Charmineuse, a Maxim girl, and gets Delphine to pose as his wife for the afternoon. Alphonse has to agree or reveal the deception that he has practised on the colonel. The uncle insists that Victor and Delphine take the Villa Primrose for their stay in Brest. Alphonse objects, but as the colonel learns he has deceived him and as Victor will become an officer in the regiment in which he is only a private, he submits to the arrangement, which is to last until the uncle leaves. After many amusing complications. during which Simone appears, Victor, Alphonse, Delphine and Simone discover that they have all made a mistake, and they decide that they will return to their former relationships.
