= Viola Gillette =

American opera singer (1871–1956)

Viola Gillette (1871–1956), born Viola Pratt, was an American contralto from Salt Lake City.

Gillette began her career as a church singer in Salt Lake City. She made her stage debut in Washington, D.C., in 1898. She subsequently moved to New York City where she sang with the Castle Square Opera Company. She was a soloist at the Fifth Avenue Baptist Church in New York from 1898 to 1899. Gillette's first concert appearance as a soloist was at the Springfield, Massachusetts, Music Festival in 1899.

For a few months in early 1901, Gillette appeared at the Shaftesbury Theatre in London. From 1901 to 1904, Gillette was employed by Klaw and Erlanger, appearing for two seasons in their production of Beauty and the Beast and for one season in Mother Goose.

In 1907, Gillette appeared as Violetta in The Girl and the Bandit. She managed to turn this role into a position managing her own company, the Viola Gillette Opera Company. In 1909 she played Nichette in The Beauty Spot at the Herald Square Theatre in New York City.

== Gallery ==
Viola Gillette

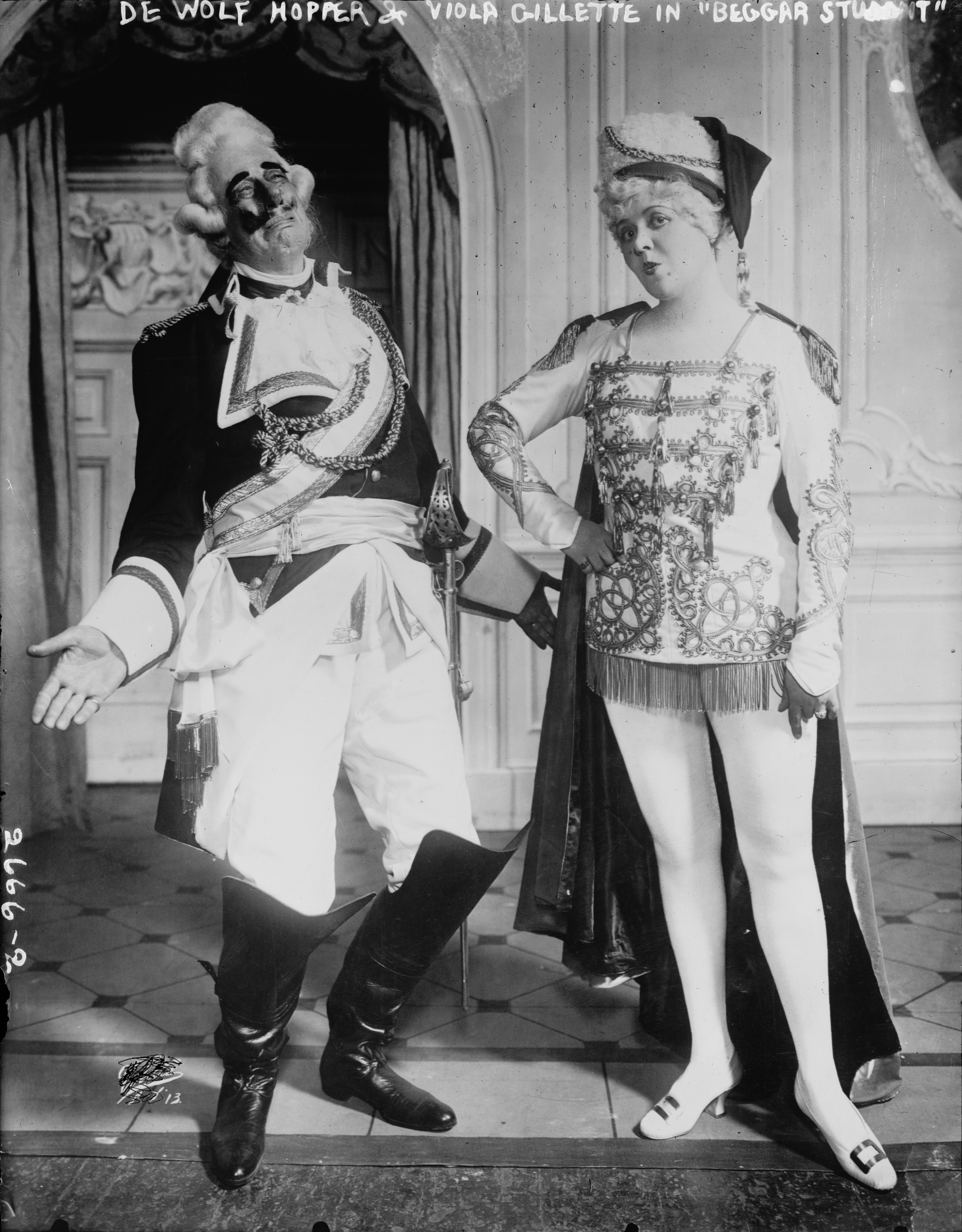
DeWolf Hopper and Viola Gillette in The Beggar Student (1913)
