= Judy Forgot =

Play by Avery Hopwood

Judy Forgot is a play by Avery Hopwood (New York, October 6, 1910) that was adapted into a 1915 film. The film is a five part comedy. Marie Cahill starred in the film. T. Hayes Hunter directed. It was produced by Universal Film Manufacturing. It was advertised as a screaming farce comedy hit filmed in five acts. Raymond L. Schrock wrote the screenplay.

Cahill portrayed Judy Evans in the play and film. She loses her memory in a train wreck. Her memory is later restored after an auto accident and she returns to her marital partner.

== Film cast ==
- Marie Cahill
- Sam Hardy as Freddy ...(Arthur Stanford as Freddy Evans, 1910 play)
