= Johnson Brothers (musical group) =

American country band

The Johnson Brothers were an Old-time Country duo best known for recording at the Bristol Sessions in 1927.

Hailing from Happy Valley, Tennessee, the Johnsons were Paul Johnson, who sang and played guitar while Charles backed him on steel guitar. They were veterans of the local vaudeville and medicine show who had already done a recording session in New York who were already known to Ralph Peer when he set up an office in Bristol, Tennessee to record local artists.

Their songs are slow mournful ballads based on traditional sentimental Victorian themes like "A Passing Policeman" (based on an 1894 song "The Little Lost Child") and "The Jealous Sweetheart". On the latter song they are accompanied by an unknown musician playing the bones, a simple percussion instrument used since ancient times, particularly with black musicians. It is assumed that this was El Watson, a harmonica player who Charles Johnson would in turn back on his own single recorded at the sessions, a harmonica showcase called "Potlicker Blues" which was recorded the same day.

Stylistically in their use of duo guitar and steel guitar the Johnson Brothers closely resemble their more successful contemporaries Darby and Tarlton and Wilmer Watts.

The singles were not notably successful ("A Passing Policeman" was not even released at the time) and the Johnsons would drop out of sight with their ultimate fates unknown. El Watson is even more obscure. Although he is assumed to have been black, it is not even known for sure if he was. After Bristol, Watson disappeared from the historical records entirely.
