= The Wild Rose (1902 musical) =

1902 musical

The Wild Rose is a musical in two acts with music by Ludwig Engländer and both book and lyrics by Harry B. Smith and George V. Hobart. The musical contained the hit song "A Most Unlucky Man" by the songwriting team of Jean Schwartz and William Jerome.

The Wild Rose premiered on Broadway in 1902. It should not be confused with the 1926 musical of the same name by Otto Harbach, Oscar Hammerstein II, and Rudolf Friml.

== History ==
Set in Strasbourg when it was part of Germany during the early years of the 20th century, The Wild Rose's loose plot concerns a band of "gypsies" who become entangled in misadventures with German soldiers and actors from a theatre troupe. It was created as a starring vehicle for Eddie Foy who portrayed Paracelsus Noodles, a phony hypnotist.

The work premiered at Broadway's Knickerbocker Theatre on May 5, 1902, where it ran for 136 performances; closing on August 30, 1902. The cast also included Marie Cahill as Vera von Lahn, Irene Bentley as Rose Romany, Evelyn Florence Nesbit as Vashti, and George Ali as "Baby". Cahill's song from this production, "Nancy Brown" by Clifton Crawford, was the inspiration for the later musical Nancy Brown and was sung there by the same actress. It was produced and staged by George W. Lederer and choreographed by Adolph Neuberger. Frederick Solomon was music director for the production. The sets were designed by D. Frank Dodge with costumes by Caroline Seidle.
