= Mother Goose (musical) =

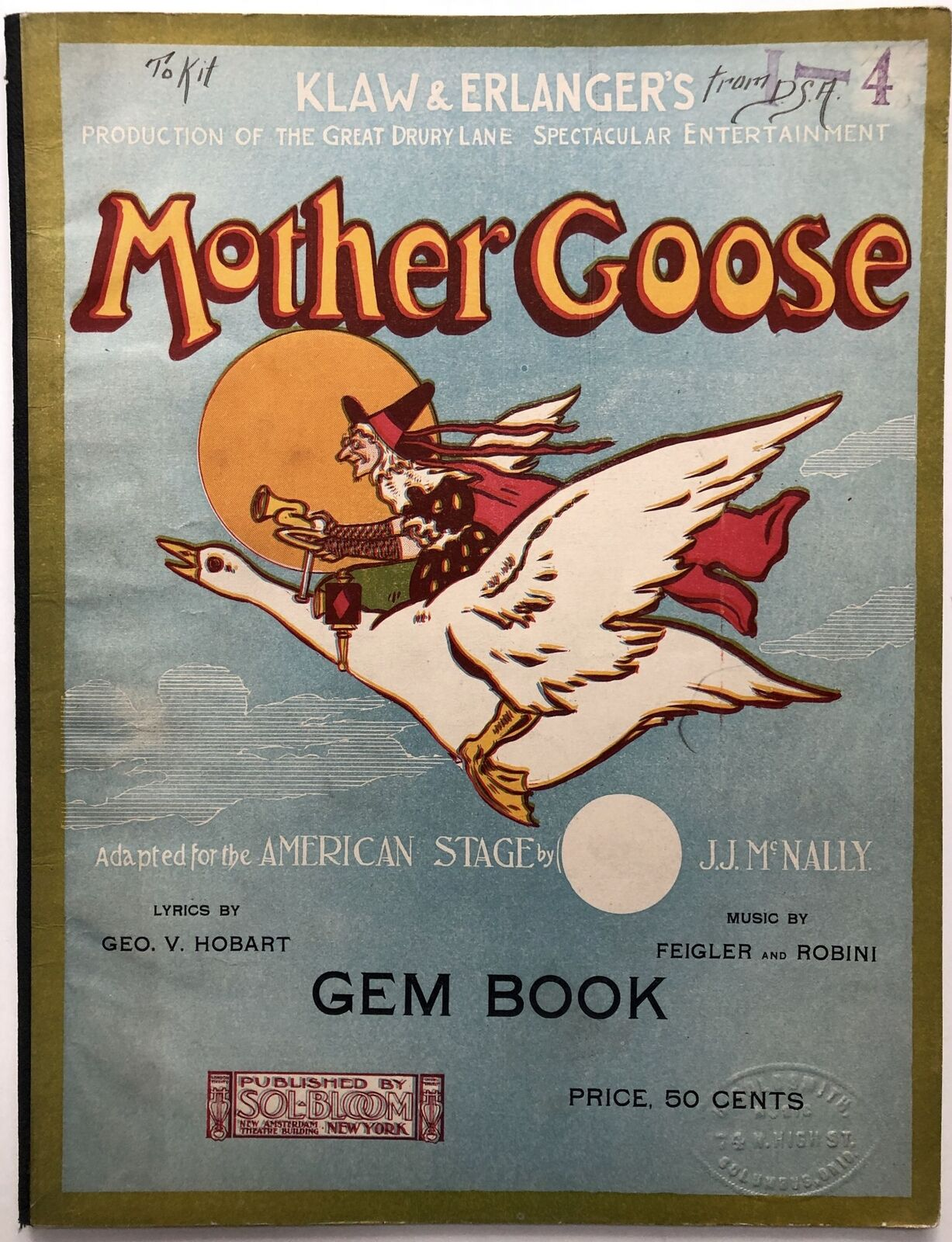
Front cover to sheet music for Mother Goose. This Little Gem Book was published in 1904 and contained new music by Robert Fiegler and L. Robini. Their music was not in the original stage production; although it did use George V. Hobart's lyrics.

Mother Goose is a musical in three acts with music by Frederick Solomon, lyrics by George V. Hobart, and a book by John J. McNally that was adapted from Arthur Collins and J. Hickory Wood's libretto for the 1902 pantomime of the same name. The work's plot pulled loosely from several fairy tales and nursery rhymes, including Mother Goose and Jack and Jill. The work also contained many songs interpolated into the production by other writers, including two songs by George M. Cohan: "Rube" and "Always Leave Them Laughing When You Say Goodbye".

== History ==
Produced by Klaw & Erlanger, Mother Goose premiered at Broadway's New Amsterdam Theatre on December 3, 1903; closing at that theatre on February 27, 1904, after 105 performances. The work was an Americanized version of Collins and Wood's British Christmas pantomime that was originally staged at the Theatre Royal, Drury Lane in 1902. In keeping with its British roots, the role of Mother Goose was performed in drag by the actor Joseph Cawthorn. Likewise, the role of Colin was a trouser role portrayed by the actress Viola Gillette. Others in the cast included Leila McIntyre as Jill, Harry Bulger as Jack, W.H. Macart as The Laird of Borderland, Allan Ramsay as King Goose, George Clennett as Vicomte Boreham, Edith Hutchins as the Fairy Queen, Charles A. Fuller as the Demon King, and Clifton Crawford as the Mayor of Chatham.
