= Illustrated song =

Type of performance art

Many magic lantern slides featured "dissolving view" effects, like this pair from "The Little Old Log Cabin in the Lane"

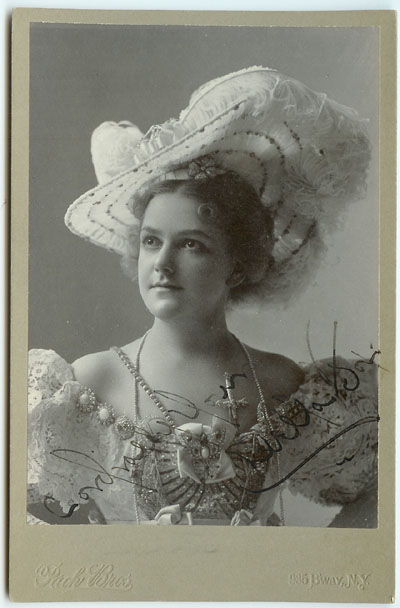
Della Fox was one of many performers whose singing and playing was part of illustrated songs.

An illustrated song is a type of performance art that combines either live or recorded music with projected images. It was a popular form of entertainment in the early 20th century in the United States. It is a predecessor of the music video.

Live performers were commonly a vocalist with a pianist accompanying. Music recordings were used by different venues: vaudeville houses hosting the live vocalist and accompanist; or nickelodeons. Nickelodeons were arcade style machines that worked by hand cranking a mechanical handle which turned an internal mechanism which played an audio recording, and had a visor-like viewing window, displaying accompany still images projected from glass slides, and also flip cards.

Flip cards were a series of photos that were successively "flipped" and displayed by the cranked mechanism of the nickelodeon, in imitation of a motion picture. So called nickelodeons, because a nickel was required to engage the cranking mechanism, in order for the viewer to start the show. The images were painted in color by hand, or were photographs which either black and white or were colorized by hand. A single song was usually accompanied by 12 to 16 different images that sequentially "illustrated" the lyrics. Projection booths used either stereopticons with two projectors or machines that combined projection of both slides, or displayed moving pictures.

Illustrated songs often preceded silent films and/or took place during reel changes, but some venues relied principally on illustrated songs alone. At least ten thousand small theaters nationwide featured illustrated songs. Illustrated songs were seen as a valuable promotional tool for marketing sheet music. Audience participation was encouraged, and repeat performances also helped encourage sheet music sales.

Several film stars began their careers as models who illustrated lyrics through a series of song slides. These stars included Roscoe Arbuckle, Fanny Brice, Eddie Cantor, George Jessel, Alice Joyce, Florence Lawrence, and Norma Talmadge.

The first illustrated song was "The Little Lost Child" in 1894. The song went on to become a nationwide hit selling more than two million copies of its sheet music, its success credited mainly to illustrated song performances which have been termed the first "music video."
