= Frederick Solomon =

British-born American composer, conductor, actor and writer

- Born: 31 August 1853; London
- Died: 9 September 1924 (aged 71); New York City, United States
- Occupations: Composer, conductor, actor, librettist, playwright, theatre director
- Spouse: Mamie Sutten (m. 1887)
- Children: 1
- Relatives: Edward Solomon (brother)

Frederick Charles Solomon (31 August 1853 – 9 September 1924), sometimes given as Fred Solomon or Frederic Solomon, was a British-born American composer, conductor, actor, librettist, playwright, theatre director, and multi-instrumentalist. After studying music at the School of Military Music, he began his career playing the cornet and acting in Britain before emigrating to the United States in 1885.

For more than three decades, he had a prolific career on Broadway and in American regional theatres in musicals and light operas. His assignments varied from acting on stage (often in Lillian Russell's company and later at the Casino Theatre), initially in several of the comic operas of his brother, Edward Solomon; writing music and/or lyrics and dialogue; conducting pit orchestras; and staging productions. For Broadway producers Klaw and Erlanger, he created several musicals that were adapted from fairytales and/or were adaptations of British pantomimes and served as music director for others.

== Early life and career in Britain: 1853–1884 ==
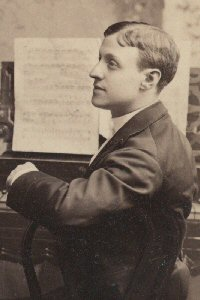
Photograph of Edward Solomon, Frederick's younger brother.

One of eleven children of Charles and Cesira Solomon, Frederick was born in London on 31 August 1853. His family was Jewish, and he was the older brother of composer Edward Solomon, who was born two years after him. His father was a music hall pianist, conductor, arranger, and composer, and like his brother Edward, Solomon grew up learning music skills from their father and performing in music hall performances throughout his childhood. He also worked as a child actor in Christmas pantomimes; including appearances in several pantomimes as a featured vocalist in productions at the Theatre Royal, Drury Lane. As a young adult he performed in touring theatre productions in London and the surrounding provinces.

Solomon studied music at the School of Military Music in Chatham, Kent, and spent several years playing in the Royal Marine Band at Chatham. He was awarded the Queen Victoria Silver Medal for his years of service in this group. He was also active as a cornetist and drummer in a London orchestra directed by W. C. Levey.

In 1881 Solomon appeared in his brother's opera Billee Taylor at The Crystal Palace, and in 1883 he toured the British provinces in that opera. Frederick's own comic opera Captain Kidd, or The Bold Buccaneer, premiered at the Prince of Wales's Theatre, Clayton Square, Liverpool, on 10 September 1883.

== Initial career in the United States: 1885–1894 ==
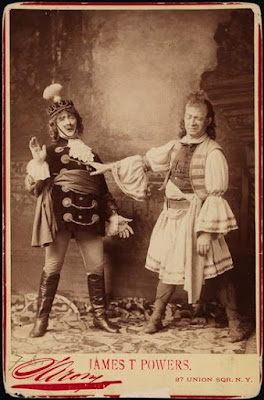
Frederick Solomon (left) as Margrave of Bobrumkorff and James T. Powers (right) as Faragas in Nadjy. A studio photograph by Napoleon Sarony made to promote Powers and the 1888 production of Nadjy at the Casino Theatre.

In 1885 Solomon emigrated to the United States. He made his debut on the American stage with Lillian Russell's theatre troupe in Cleveland, Ohio, on 22 September 1885 as Major General Bangs in his brother's comic opera Polly, or the Pet of the Regiment, with his brother conducting. By January 1886 Solomon had left Russell's theatre troupe and had established his own acting company, both directing and starring in the farce Inside Out in a touring production that began its performances in Minneapolis, Minnesota. He then returned to Russell's company in another of his brother's operas, portraying Curaso in Pepita, or The Girl with the Glass Eye in theatres in Boston, Massachusetts, and New York City from March through May 1886. He remained with that company in Erminie, in which two of Solomon's original songs (as both composer and lyricist) were interpolated: "The Love Bird" and "When Love Is Asleep".

After appearing on the New York stage as Reverend Thayer in his brother's critical flop The Maid and the Moonshiner, Solomon left Russell's company and began a six-year-long period as a leading actor under Rudolph Aronson at Broadway's Casino Theatre. There he starred in long-running productions of Erminie, Poor Jonathan (English language title for Carl Millöcker's Der Arme Jonathan), The Brigands, and Francis Chassaigne's Nadjy. He simultaneously was active as a composer, writing the music to the 1887 comic opera Pasquillo, or the Bottled Up Kingdom with a libretto by A. K. Fulton. He also wrote music for The Night Owl, a work that toured in vaudeville in 1887. Solomon married Mamie Sutten, a chorus girl at the Casino Theatre, in 1887. They had one son together, William Frederick Solomon, who was born in 1888. In 1888 the Casino staged his comic opera Yulee (libretto by Frank Dupree, later retitled King Kaliko for 1892 Broadway revival), and that same year the burlesque star May Howard toured in productions of his works The Roman Fete and Black Sheep.

From 1889 to 1892 Solomon worked as a librettist for numerous works performed at Koster & Bial's Music Hall, also occasionally working as a composer. From 1892 to 1894 he toured as a member of Pauline Hall's opera company. His duties with that company varied widely from work to work, from performing, to conducting and/or stage directing. Several of his original songs were also interpolated into productions by that troupe. With Hall's company his most prominent success was as the leading comic actor in Edgar Stillman Kelley's Puritania.

== Later life and career: 1895–1924 ==
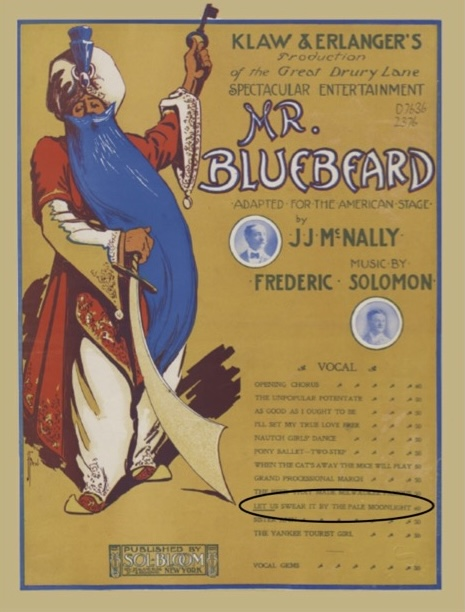
Front cover of sheet music for the 1903 Broadway musical Mr. Bluebeard. It was one of several musicals adapted for the Broadway stage by Solomon and the playwright John J. McNally from pantomimes created by Arthur Collins and J. Hickory Wood for the Theatre Royal, Drury Lane.

In 1895 Solomon's brother Edward died, and after this his career shifted increasingly away from acting into composing and conducting for the Broadway producers Klaw and Erlanger. For them he wrote the music and served as music director for the Broadway musicals The Sleeping Beauty and the Beast (1901), Mr. Bluebeard (1903), Mother Goose (1903), and Humpty Dumpty (1904, also lyricist). These musicals were adapted from fairytales and/or were adaptations of British pantomimes. He was also music director for the Klaw and Erlanger Broadway productions of The Wild Rose (1902), A Little Bit of Everything (1904, also contributing composer and lyricist), Lifting the Lid (1905), The White Cat (1905), Forty-five Minutes from Broadway (1906), and Oh! Oh! Delphine (1912).

Solomon staged the 1899 Broadway revivals of La Belle Hélène (Casino Theatre) and Ludwig Englander's In Gay Paree (New York Theatre). He also worked periodically as a music director for other Broadway producers. For the Shubert family and A.H. Chamberlyn he was the music director for The Cadet Girl at the Herald Square Theatre in 1900. For Florenz Ziegfeld Jr. he served as conductor for the Ziegfeld Follies in 1908. In 1920 he was music director for the national tour of The Rainbow Girl.

Solomon died on 9 September 1924, at the age of 71, in New York City.
