= Joseph W. Stern & Co. =

American music publishing company

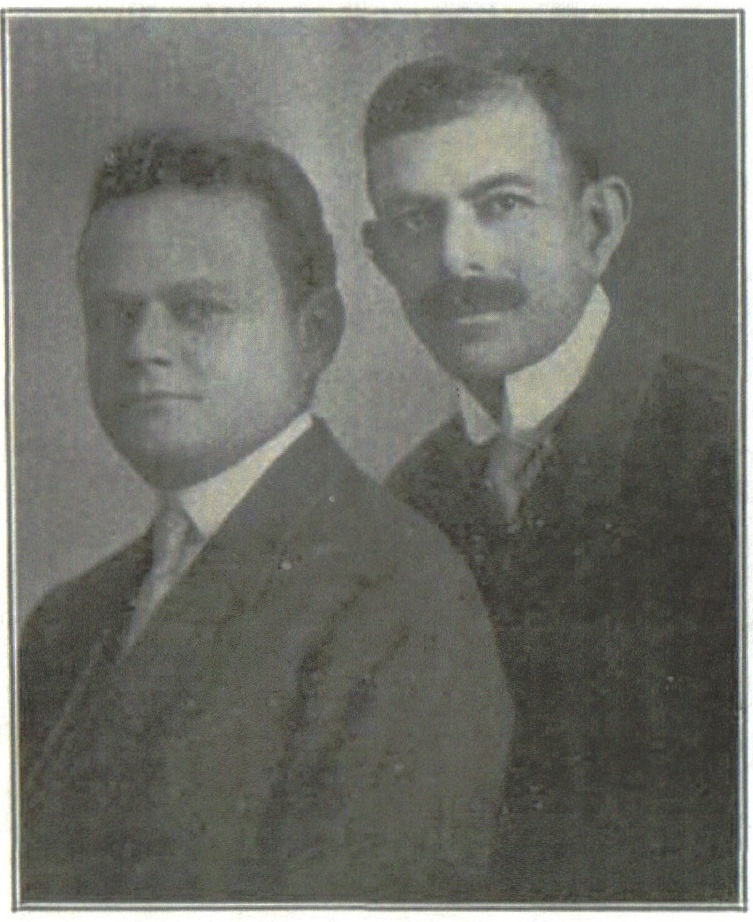
Joseph W. Stern and Edward B. Marks in 1919

Joseph W. Stern & Co. was a music publisher in New York City. The Library of Congress has dozens of their songsheets including numerous coon songs in its collection.

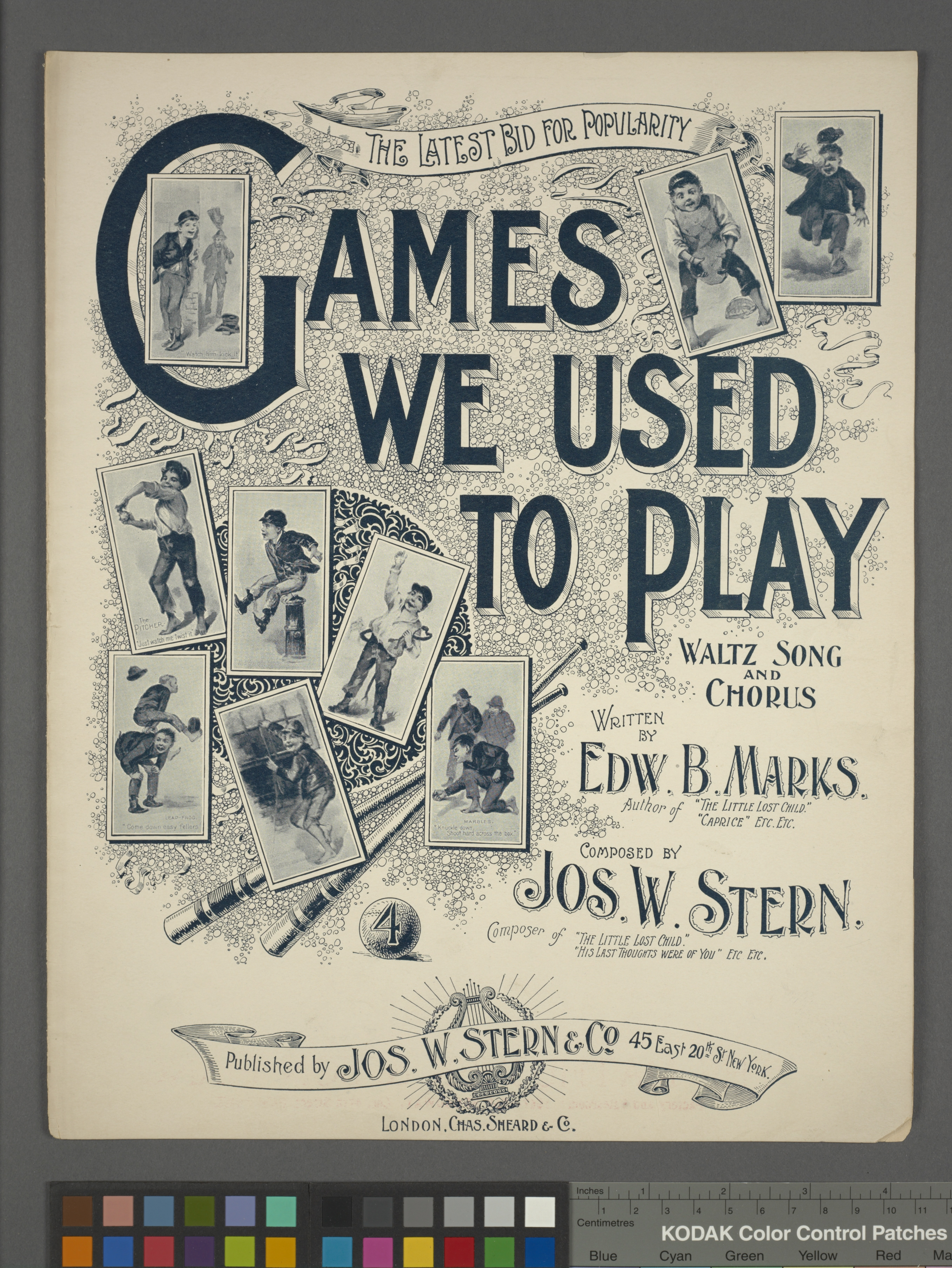

== History ==
Joseph W. Stern (January 11, 1870 - March 31, 1934) was a self taught pianist and traveling salesman. He partnered with fellow travelling salesman Edward B. Marks (November 28, 1865 - December 17, 1945) to found the music publishing company in 1894. They promoted their music with performances accompanied by colored lantern slides."The Little Lost Child" was the first song they published and became a huge hit.

Stern retired in 1920 and the firm became Edward B. Marks Music Company. Its publishings include hits such as "Strange Fruit" by Abel Meeropol (made famous by Billie Holiday) in 1939. The company has been a subsidiary of Carlin America since 1980.

== Publishings ==
- "The Little Lost Child"
- Music and songs from the 1902 Broadway show Sally in Our Alley
- "Eli Green's Cakewalk"
- "Don't Wear Your Heart on Your Sleeve"
- "Games We Used to Play"
- The Glow-Worm

== Gallery ==
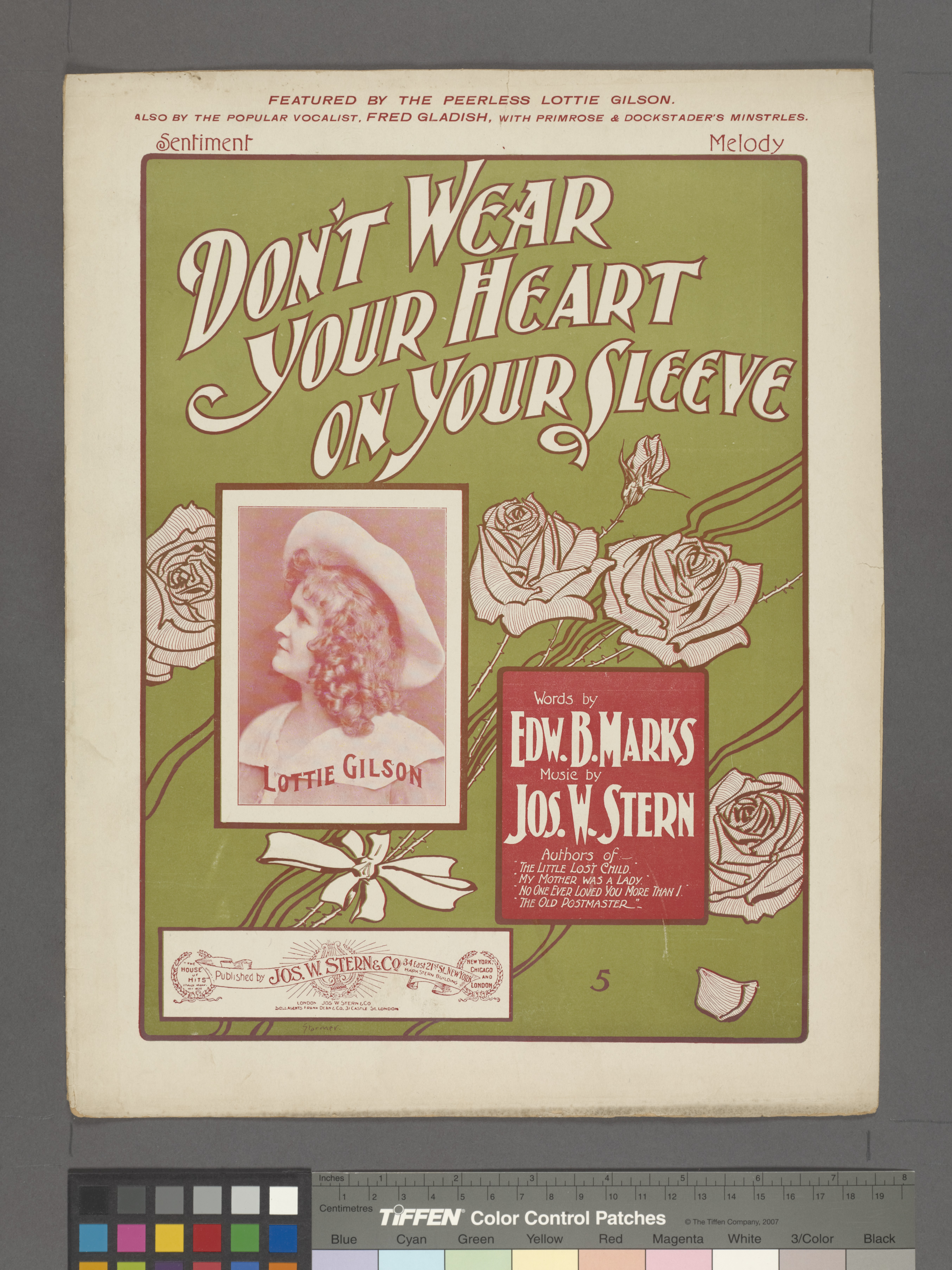

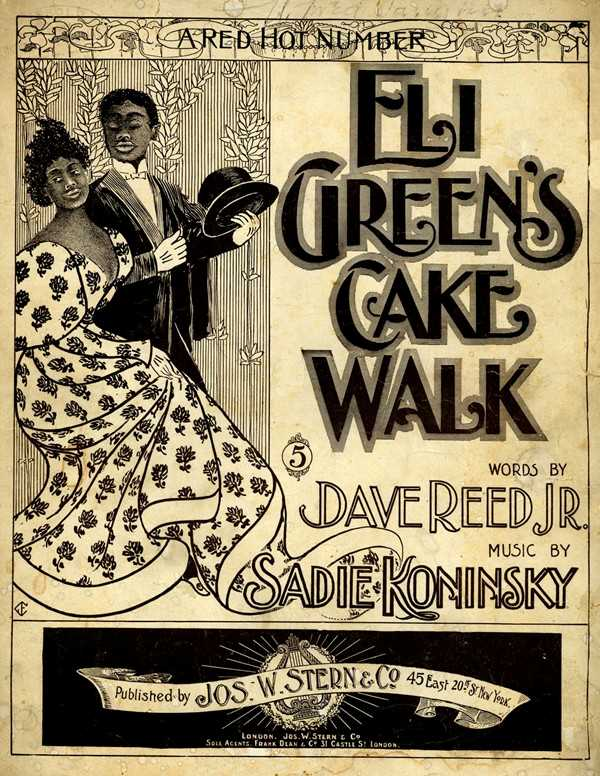

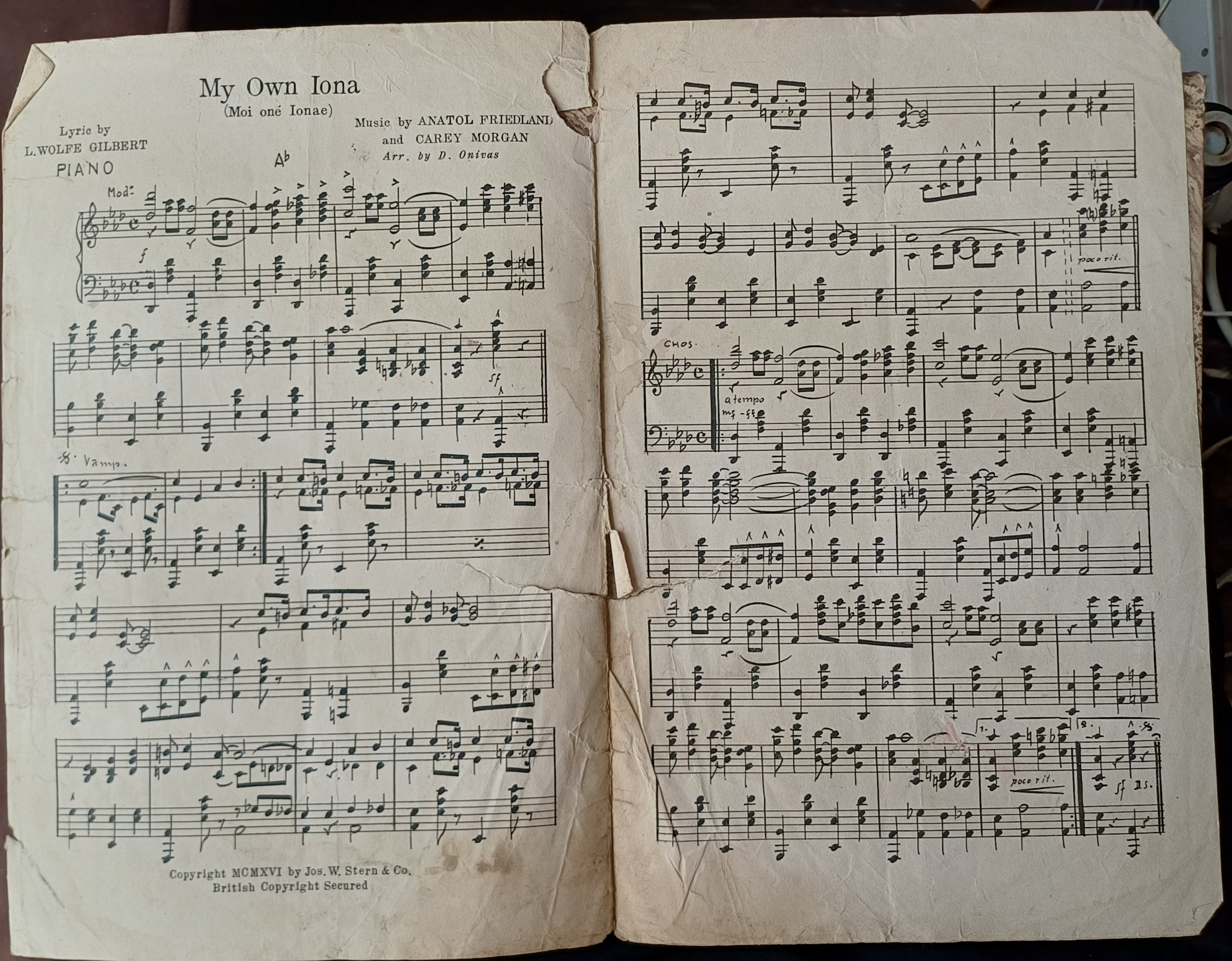

== See also ==
- Tin Pan Alley
