= Marie Cahill =

American actress and singer (1866–1933)

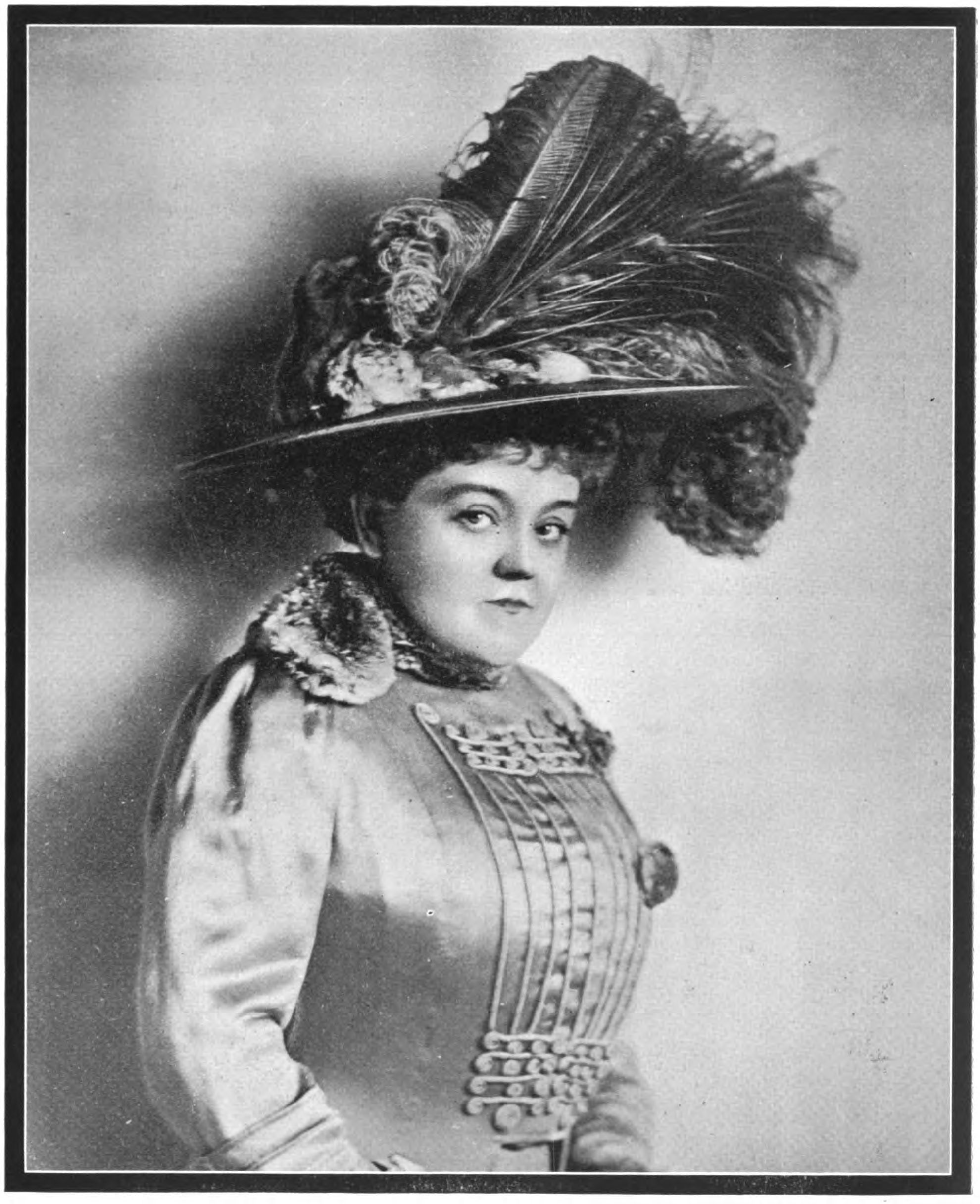
- Born: Mary Cahill; December 29, 1866; Brooklyn, New York, US
- Died: August 23, 1933 (aged 66); New York City, US
- Occupation: Actress/Vocalist
- Years active: 1888–1933
- Spouse: Daniel V. Arthur (m. 1903)

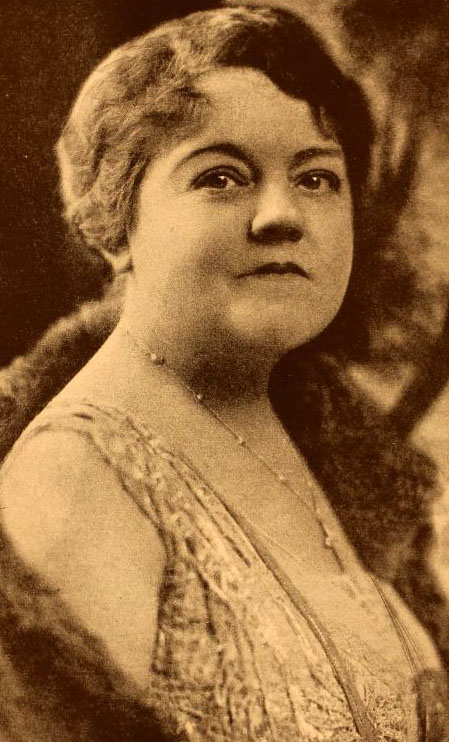
Advertisement (1917)

Marie Cahill (December 29, 1866 – August 23, 1933) was a Broadway stage actress and vocalist. Her parents were Irish immigrants Richard and Mary (née Groegen) Cahill. She appeared in comic operas including Judy Forgot. She was also in films.

== Stage career ==
Cahill began her career in the late 1880s first in her native Brooklyn and then on Broadway. She starred opposite Eddie Foy in the 1902 Broadway musical The Wild Rose. That same year she starred in the show Sally in Our Alley in which she introduced the song "Under the Bamboo Tree". It became her signature song and one of the most famous songs from the turn of the century. Also in 1902 in the musical The Wild Rose she premiered another hit song, "Nancy Brown". In 1903 the popularity of "Nancy Brown" was expanded into its own musical, Nancy Brown, for Cahill, and became her favorite role. She had a jolly demeanor, and in addition to being a singer she presented herself as a conversationalist in a style that at best anticipates the later Gracie Allen. Daniel Blum in Great Stars of the American Theatre c. 1952 relates that Cahill was a very proper woman who didn't tolerate naughty behavior or salaciousness. However, in contrast she could don a pair of tights in a musical and exude sex appeal. In appearance she resembled rival Della Fox.

== Movies and other media ==
Cahill recorded her voice and routines at several Gramophone recording sessions in the years 1917 to 1924 all in the acoustical recording method. She also had recorded her signature song "Under the Bamboo Tree" in 1902. In 1915 Cahill appeared in her first silent film, Judy Forgot, based on her musical comedy of the same name performed on Broadway in 1911. In 1917 she appeared in three more silent films; Gladys' Day Dreams, When Betty Bets and Patsy's Partner before giving up on the medium.

Several of Cahill's voice recordings (monologues), made between 1916 and 1924, are on file at the Library of Congress' National Jukebox. They include "Washing baby" (1921), "The symphony concert" (1923) and "At the theatre" (1924). "At the theatre" takes the form of a telephone conversation with an unheard party in which Cahill, as "Mrs. Pinthrop," describes goings-on—including the appearance of Marie Cahill ("Irish, I guess... well, maybe she is Jewish")—at the Palace Theatre.

== Personal life ==
She had an older brother named Richard. Both her father and brother ran a brush making business.

Cahill married Daniel V. Arthur on June 18, 1903, a union that lasted until she died on August 23, 1933. Daniel Arthur survived his wife by six years, dying on December 6, 1939.

== Filmography ==
- Judy Forgot (1915)
- Gladys' Day Dreams (1917)(*short)
- When Betty Bets (1917) (*short)
- Patsy's Partner (1917)(*short)
