= Sally in Our Alley (song) =

1725 song by Henry Carey

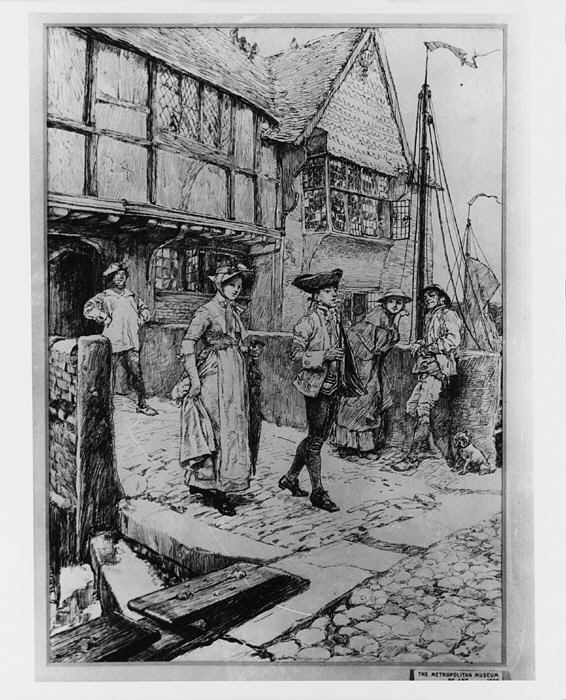
An 1886 illustration of the song.

"Sally in Our Alley" is a traditional English song, originally written by Henry Carey in 1725. It became a standard of British popular music over the following century. The expression also entered popular usage, giving its name to a 1902 Broadway musical and several films including Sally in Our Alley, the 1931 screen debut of Gracie Fields, in which she sang a different song named "Sally".

== Lyrics ==
The song has seven verses, the first of which is:

Of all the girls that are so smart
There 's none like pretty Sally;
She is the darling of my heart,
And she lives in our alley.
There is no lady in the land
Is half so sweet as Sally;
She is the darling of my heart,
And she lives in our alley.

== Arrangements ==
Ludwig van Beethoven- 25 Scottish Folksongs Op 108 no 25

Frank Bridge (1916)- arrangement for string orchestra

Benjamin Britten

== Bibliography ==
- Helen Kendrick Johnson. Our Familiar Songs and Those who Made Them: Three Hundred Standard Songs of the English-speaking Race, Arranged with Piano Accompaniment, and Preceded by Sketches of the Writers and Histories of Their Songs, Volume 1. H. Holt, 1881.
