= List of burials at Southern Cemetery, Manchester =

Coordinates: 53.4286°N 2.2582°W

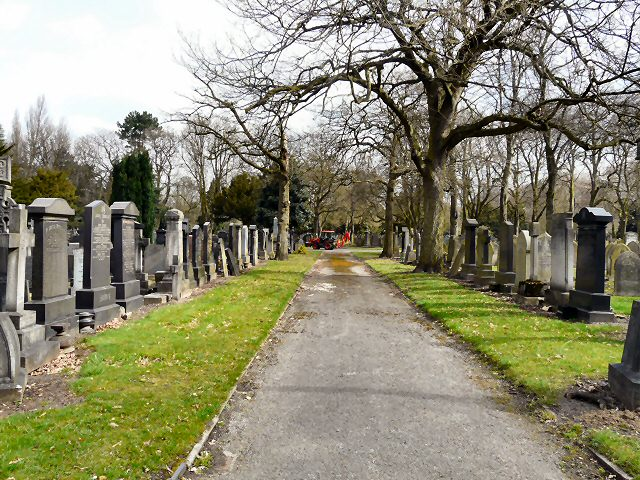
Southern Cemetery, Manchester

This list of burials at Southern Cemetery, Manchester covers notable people who have been interred at the municipal burial ground in Manchester, North West England.

== Map ==
Notable burials at Southern Cemetery, Manchester

== Burials ==
	Name	Dates	Info	Section
Daniel Adamson grave	Daniel Adamson	1820–1890	English engineer and builder of the Manchester Ship Canal	Centre A39 (CE)
Sir John Alcock grave	Flight Com. Sir John W. Alcock	1892–1919	RAF officer, piloted the first non-stop transatlantic flight	Centre - G (CE)
Philip Baybutt grave	Philip James Baybutt	1844–1907	Union Army soldier in the American Civil War	H2085 (CE)
Maud Boyd grave	Maud Boyd	1867–1929	English actress and singer Memorial is broken and inscription is partly submerged	D641 (RC)
Matt Busby grave	Sir Matt Busby	1909–1994	Manager of Manchester United FC	G997 (RC)
Jerome Caminada grave	Jerome Caminada	1844–1914	Policeman and Manchester's first CID superintendent.	H1742 (RC)
John Cassidy grave	John Cassidy	1860–1939	Irish sculptor and painter	I800 (RC)
John Henry Davies memorial	John Henry Davies	1864–1927	Beer brewer and founder of Manchester United FC	A (NC)
Grave of Lesley Ann Downey	Lesley Ann Downey	1954-1964	Victim of the Moors murders	
gravestone	Edward Evans	1948-1965	Victim of the Moors murders	
Rob Gretton grave	Rob Gretton	1953–1999	Music manager of Joy Division and New Order and a director of Factory Records	G278 (RC)
Leopold Grindon grave	Leopold Hartley Grindon	1818–1904	English educator and botanist	B899 (CE)
Martin Hannett grave	Martin Hannett	1948–1991	Guitarist, record producer, and a director of Factory Records	FF713 (RC)
Grave of Major Howard Harker	Major Howard Harker	1891–1919	British World War I flying ace and recipient of the Military Cross	D84 (NC)
Frank Johnson grave engraved with boxing gloves	Frank Johnson (real name Frank Williamson)	1928-1970	English boxer and British lightweight and welterweight champion	AA 2925(CE)?
Len Johnson grave	Len Johnson	1902–1974	Boxer and civil rights campaigner	EE740 (CE)
Henry Kelly (VC) grave	Henry Kelly VC	1887–1960	WWI and WWII soldier and recipient of the Victoria Cross	I372 (RC)
	Marcel King	1957–1995	English singer with the Soul music band Sweet Sensation	F1398 (RC)
grave of L.S. Lowry	L. S. Lowry	1887–1976	Painter of industrial scenes in Lancashire	C772 (CE)
Grave of John Makeague	John Makeague	d.1919	Lord Mayor of the City of Manchester 1918-19	G964 (CE)
Ernest Marples family grave	Sir Alfred Ernest Marples, Baron Marples of Wallasey	1907–1978	Politician who served as Postmaster General and Minister of Transport	G898 (CE)
Billy Meredith grave	Billy Meredith	1874–1958	Footballer for both Manchester City FC and Manchester United FC	Y760 (CE)
Grave of Joseph James Pardoe	Sergeant Major Joseph Pardoe	1820-1889	Heavy Brigade Officer at the Battle of Balaclava in the Crimean War	L 1691 (CE)
	Henry Patteson	1835–1887	Lord Mayor of the City of Manchester 1879-80	
Maria Pawlikowsk-Jasnorzewska grave	Maria Pawlikowska-Jasnorzewska	1891–1945	Polish poet and playwright	I2182 (RC)
Grave of Sir Robert Peacock	Sir Robert Peacock	1859-1926	Chief constable of Manchester City Police 1898-1926	D 1133 (NC)
Wilfred Pickles grave	Wilfred Pickles	1904–1978	Film actor and BBC Radio presenter.	I1012 (RC)
John Prettyjohns grave	John Prettyjohns VC	1823–1887	Royal Marine in the Crimean War and recipient of the Victoria Cross	L642 (CE)
gravestone	Andy Rourke	1964-2023	Bass guitarist, most notably for The Smiths	L2979 (RC)
Sir Samuel Walter Royse grave	Sir Samuel Walter Royse	1850–1916	Lord Mayor of the City of Manchester 1911-13	
John Rylands tomb	John Rylands; Enriquetta Augustina Rylands	1801–1888	Entrepreneur and philanthropist husband and wife behind the John Rylands Library	E 201/2 (NC)
	Joseph Sunlight	1889– 1978	Belarusian / English architect and Liberal politician	DD9 (J)
gravestone	Dr Henry Watson	1846-1911	Composer and RNCM professor of music	B 297 (CE)
wilding grave	Winifred Wilding and David Wilding	d.1957	Mother and infant son killed in their house in the 1957 Wythenshawe plane crash	K 286 (RC)
Tony Wilson grave	Tony Wilson	1950–2007	Broadcaster, impresario and a director of Factory Records	B118 (NC)
Olive Zorian grave	Olive Zorian	1916–1965	classical violinist and founder of the Zorian String Quartet	D557 (NC)

Key: CE=Church of England RC=Roman Catholic NC=Nonconformist J=Jewish
