= Barbakan Delicatessen =

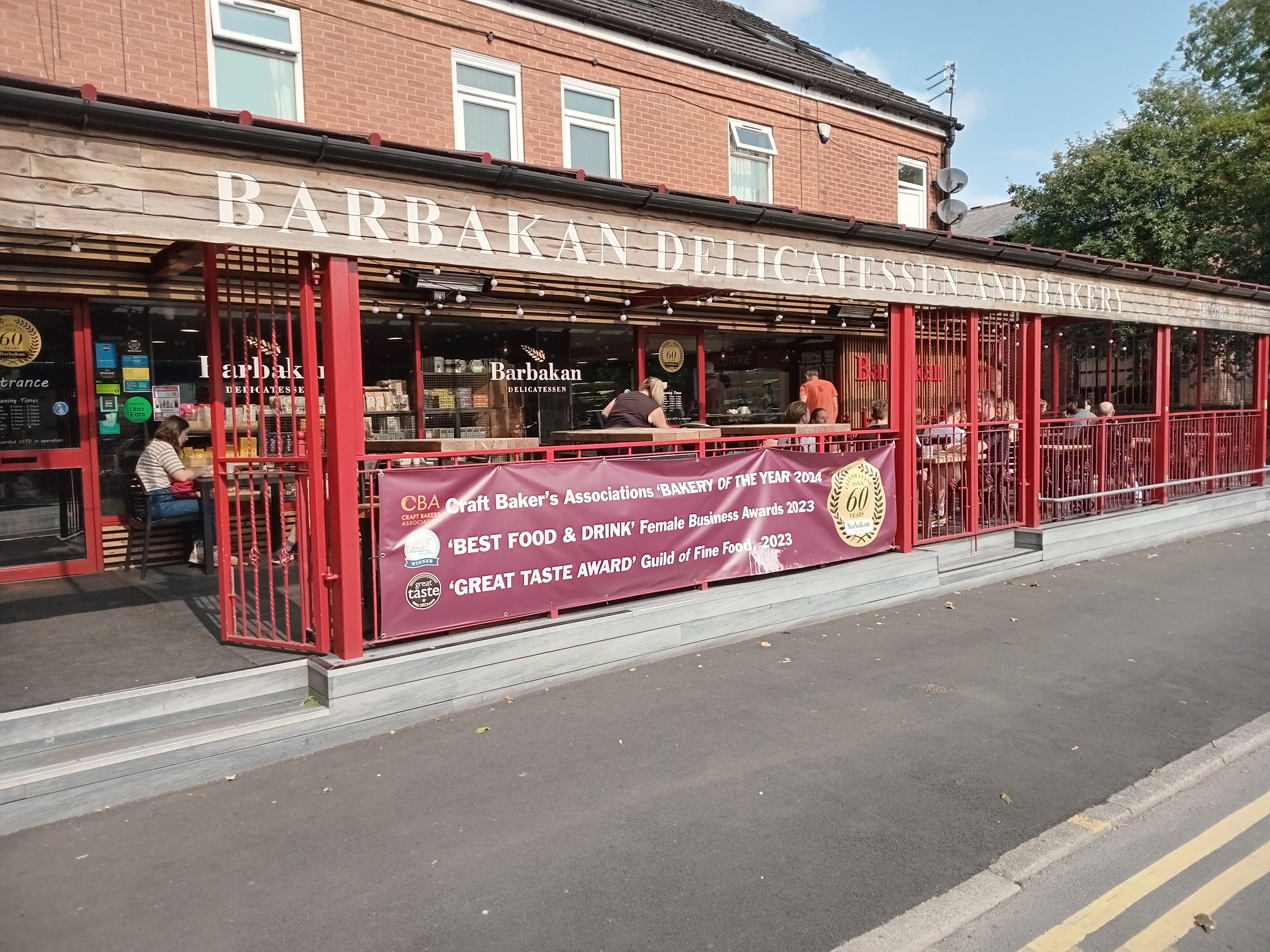
- Interactive map of Barbakan Delicatessen

Restaurant information
- Established: 1964
- Location: Chorlton, Manchester, England
- Website: barbakan-deli.co.uk

The Barbakan Delicatessen is a bakery and delicatessen in Chorlton, Manchester, England. It was established in 1964.

== History ==
The Barbican Delicatessen was established in 1964 to serve south Manchester's Polish community. The area has had a large Polish community since the late 1940s.

It was bought from two Polish brothers by Stefan Najduch in 1985.

== Operations ==
The shop is busy both day and night, as the baking is done during the night. It uses nine tonnes of flour per week.

As of 2007, Barbakan baked more than 45 types of bread each day.

In 2026 it had a turnover of £2.3 million a year but wrote to Andy Burnham asking for help with the increasing costs of running the business.

== Awards ==
- 2013 Manchester Evening News' best regional deli
- 2024 Craft Bakery Association's Bakery of the Year
- 2024 La Liste Pastry Award
