= Merseybank =

Housing estate in Manchester, England

Coordinates: 53.423°N 2.263°W

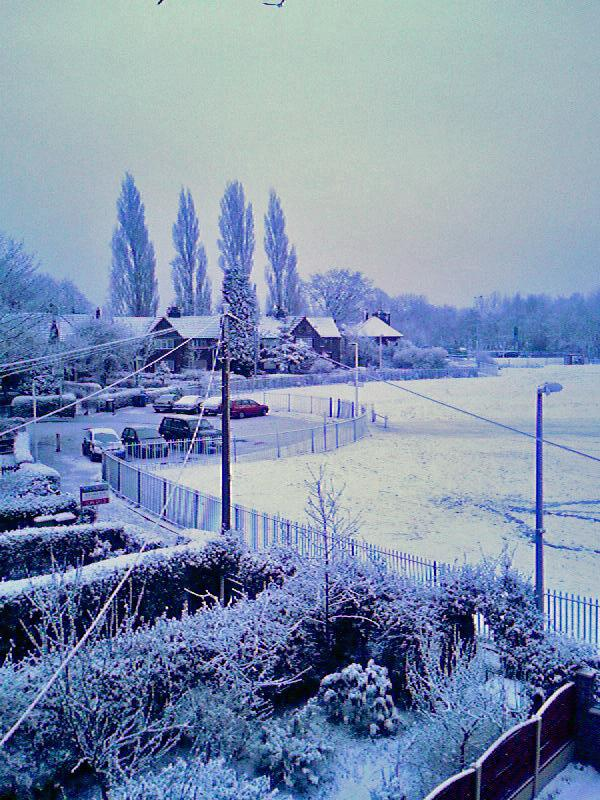
Riverside Avenue on Merseybank, winter 2005

Merseybank is a housing estate between Chorlton-cum-Hardy and West Didsbury in Manchester, England.
