= Listed buildings in Manchester-M21 =

Manchester is a city in Northwest England. The M21 postcode area of the city includes the suburb of Chorlton-cum-Hardy. This postcode area contains 19 listed buildings that are recorded in the National Heritage List for England. Of these, one is listed at Grade II*, the middle of the three grades, and the others are at Grade II, the lowest grade. The area is mainly residential. It also contains Southern Cemetery, and a number of buildings associated with this are listed, including structures at the entrance, the chapels, a memorial, and the crematorium. Most of the other listed buildings are houses, and also included are a church, a public house and hotel, the gateway to a former church, a library, and a war memorial.

== Key ==
Grade	Criteria
II*	Particularly important buildings of more than special interest
II	Buildings of national importance and special interest

== Buildings ==
Name and location	Photograph	Date	Notes	Grade
Barlow Hall; 53.42501°N 2.26891°W	—	1570s or later	A manor house, much altered and extended, damaged by fire in 1879, and later used as a golf clubhouse. It is in brick with some timber framing and slate roofs. There are three ranges around a courtyard, and two storeys. The north east bay is timber framed on a sandstone plinth, it is jettied and gabled, and contains a twelve-light mullioned and transomed window and a three-light casement window, a carved bressumer, and bargeboards with pierced quatrefoils. At the southwest corner is a single-storey semicircular bay window.	II
Hough End Hall; 53.43578°N 2.26507°W		1596	An Elizabethan manor house, later altered, extended and used for other purposes, it is in brown brick on a sandstone plinth, and has sandstone dressings and a stone-slate roof. There are three storeys and five bays, all gabled, with the outer bays projecting forward. The central doorway has a chamfered surround, and the windows are mullioned and transomed. In the left return are two massive chimney stacks, and at the rear are four unequal gables. Inside there are large inglenooks with chamfered bressumers.	II*
Barn, Rowthorne House; 53.43818°N 2.26698°W	—	Late 18th century	The barn has been altered and used for other purposes, and is in red brick. It has an L-shaped plan, with a range parallel to the road and a rear wing at the right. Many of the openings have been altered, including wagon entrances and loading doors. There are vents in diamond patterns, and external steps on the left side.	II
Rowthorne House; 53.43803°N 2.26697°W	—	Late 18th century	A farmhouse, later used for other purposes, it is in red brick with a dentilled wooden eaves cornice and a composition tile roof. There are two storeys, a symmetrical front of three bays, and a single-storey extension to the west. On the south front the doorway has been blocked and the windows contain altered glazing. On the north front is a central doorway with a porch, and the windows are mullioned and transomed with small-pane glazing. Below the ground floor windows are semicircular steps.	II
Higginbottom Farmhouse; 53.43817°N 2.28347°W	—	Early 19th century	A farmhouse, later a private house, in red brick with a slate roof. It has two storeys, a double-depth plan, a symmetrical front of two bays, a service wing, and a dairy in the angle. Above the doorway is a canopy, and the windows are casements, those on the front with segmental heads.	II
St Clement's Church; 53.44071°N 2.28370°W		1861	The south transept and chancel were added in 1895. The church is in sandstone with slate roofs, and is in Decorated style. It consists of a nave with a clerestory, north and south aisles, a northwest timber framed porch, north and south transepts, a chancel and a southwest tower. The tower has an octagonal belfry stage, and a short spire with lucarnes.	II
Lloyd and Platt's Hotel; 53.44243°N 2.28108°W		1870	A public house and hotel in red brick with sandstone dressings, bracketed eaves, and a slate roof, on a corner site. There are two storeys, with five bays on the front and a single-storey two-bay extension to the left. Steps lead up to the doorway that has a rectangular fanlight and a canopy on corbels. To the left is a two-storey canted bay window. In the right return is a similar doorway with a two-storey bow window to the left. The windows are sashes. At the rear the ground floor is arcaded with cast iron columns, and above is a central oriel window and a shallow gable.	II
Church of England Chapel, Southern Cemetery; 53.42953°N 2.25904°W		1879	The chapel is in sandstone, it has a slate roof with red ridge tiles, and is in Gothic style. The chapel consists of a nave, an aisle, a transept, a chancel, a vestry, and a steeple. The steeple has a tower that incorporates a porch, and has two unequal stages, corner pilasters. and a pyramidal spire with a finial and a weathervane.	II
Entrance, Southern Cemetery; 53.42769°N 2.26126°W		c. 1879	At the entrance to the cemetery are six sandstone gate piers and wrought iron gates. The piers are in Gothic style, the inner pair being taller. Each pier has a chamfered base, traceried gablets, and a short octagonal spirelet. There are double gates in the centre, and single pedestrian gates at the sides.	II
Entrance lodge, Southern Cemetery; 53.42766°N 2.26097°W	—	1879	The lodge is in sandstone, it has a slate roof with red ridge tiles, and is in Gothic style. There are two storeys and a tower. The tower is square with a square-headed doorway under a segmental-pointed arch, a string course, bands, a narrow lancet window, a wooden arcaded belfry, and a spire with a weathervane. To the left is a gabled wing containing a bay window, and a sash window, and to the right is another wing.	II
Nonconformist Chapel, Southern Cemetery; 53.42971°N 2.26185°W	—	1879	The chapel is in sandstone, it has a slate roof with red ridge tiles, and is in Gothic style. The chapel consists of a nave, a northeast vestry and a southeast tower incorporating a porch. The tower has four stages, the top stage octagonal, an arched doorway with a chamfered surround and a gablet, corner pilasters, pseudo-gargoyles, and a short spire.	II
Registrar's office, Southern Cemetery; 53.42792°N 2.26144°W		1879	The office is in sandstone, it has a slate roof with red ridge tiles, and is in Gothic style. The building has an irregular plan consisting of a two-storey main block, a single storey wing and a tower in the angle. The main block has two gabled dormers, and in the wing is a canted bay window. The tower has three stages, an arched doorway, an octagonal top stage with clock faces and lancet windows, and a short spire.	II
Roman Catholic Chapel, Southern Cemetery; 53.42797°N 2.25784°W		1879	The chapel is in sandstone, it has a slate roof with red ridge tiles, and is in Gothic style. It consists of a nave, a southwest porch and a northwest tower. The tower has four stages, the top stage octagonal, clasping buttresses, an arched doorway, and a short spire. The porch has an arched doorway, chamfered jambs, a moulded head, and a coped gable with an apex cross. The windows in the nave are lancets.	II
Gatehouse and bell turret 53.43801°N 2.28302°W		1888	The gateway to the former Church of St Clement which was demolished in 1949. The gatehouse is in brick with a semicircular arch, ramped side walls including a round-headed doorway on the south. It is surmounted by an octagonal bell turret with a tiled spirelet.	II
Crematorium, Southern Cemetery; 53.43084°N 2.26619°W	—	1890	The crematorium, designed by Edward Salomons in Romanesque style, is in yellow terracotta with a tiled roof. It has a rectangular plan and a chimney disguised as a campanile. The aisles open outwards forming loggias with arches on circular columns that act as columbaria. There is a projecting gabled porch with a round-headed opening on coupled columns with zigzag fluting, ornamental caps, a panelled soffit, an enriched extrados, and a Lombard frieze. The inner doorway is square headed with a semicircular tympanum.	II
Former Chorlton Snooker Centre; 53.44426°N 2.27885°W		1907	Originally a Temperance Billiard Hall, it has been converted into a public house. It is in red brick and terracotta, and has a barrel vaulted roof. The front wall is semicircular with a nine-light bow window, to the right is a double doorway with a triple fanlight, and above is a Venetian window. Protruding from the left corner is a hexagonal pavilion with a domed roof acting as a porch. Along the right return are four five-light dormers under curved heads.	II
Chorlton Library; 53.44473°N 2.27892°W		1914	The library was built with a grant from Andrew Carnegie. It is red brick and Portland stone, with a parapet, partly balustraded, a flat roof and an octagonal dome, and is in Edwardian Baroque style. The entrance front has three bays, it is rusticated, and in the centre is a semicircular distyle in antis Ionic portico. In the east front are four bays, the right bay containing a recessed canted bay window flanked by Ionic columns, and in the other bays are sash windows with architraves and triple keystones.	II
Alcock monument 53.42868°N 2.25987°W		c. 1920	The memorial in the Southern Cemetery commemorates the pilot Sir John Alcock. It is in white marble, and consists of a richly carved Celtic cross on a pedestal with a stepped base. On the pedestal are inscriptions recording Alcock's main achievements. The memorial stands in an enclosure containing a marble rock and a propeller.	II
War memorial 53.44179°N 2.28231°W		c. 1920	The war memorial is in the churchyard of Chorlton Methodist Church immediately to the south of the church. It is in granite, and consists of a Celtic cross standing on a series of square plinths with inscriptions and the names of those lost in both World Wars.	II
