= Lloyd and Platt's Hotel =

Listed pub in Manchester, England

Lloyd and Platt
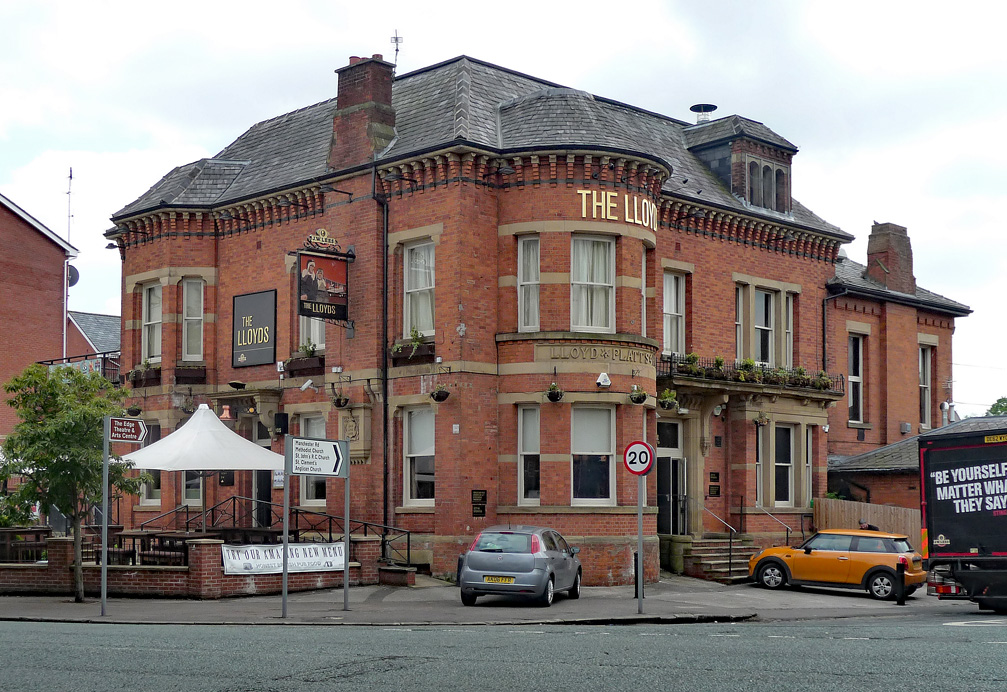
- The pub in 2016
- Former names: Lloyd's Hotel; Lloyd Hotel; The Lloyds
- Alternative names: Lloyd and Platt

General information
- Type: Public house
- Location: 617 Wilbraham Road, Chorlton-cum-Hardy, Manchester, England
- Coordinates: 53.4426°N 2.2804°W
- Year built: c. 1870; 156 years ago
- Renovated: Late 19th or early 20th century (added); Late 20th century (altered and added); 2014 and 2024 (refurbished)
- Owner: J. W. Lees

Design and construction
- Architect: E. J. Thompson
- Designations

Listed Building – Grade II
- Official name: Lloyd and Platts Hotel
- Designated: 3 April 2003
- Reference no.: 1096127

Website
- lloydandplatt.info

The Lloyd and Platt's Hotel (previously known as The Lloyds and now trading as Lloyd and Platt) is a Grade II listed public house on Wilbraham Road in Chorlton-cum-Hardy, a suburban area of Manchester, England. Built around 1870 for George Lloyd and James Platt and believed to have been designed by the Manchester architect E. J. Thompson, it includes later 19th and 20th‑century additions and an attached rear range facing the associated bowling green. The pub has been operated as part of the J. W. Lees brewery estate since at least the early 2010s.

== History ==
The Lloyd and Platt's Hotel was built around 1870 for the local partnership of George Lloyd, a landowner, and James Platt, a builder, whose names appear in raised lettering on the Manchester Road elevation. The building is believed to have been designed by the Manchester architect E. J. Thompson.

The building is shown on 1890s and 1920s Ordnance Survey maps as the Lloyd's Hotel. By the 1930s, mapping evidence records it as the Lloyd Hotel public house, indicating that the premises were operating as a pub by that time.

On 3 April 2003, the pub was designated a Grade II listed building. In 2014 the pub reopened following a major refurbishment. The date at which it became part of the J. W. Lees estate is not recorded in any published source, but it was operating as one of the brewery's houses by the early 2010s. A refurbishment led by the brewery was reported early in 2024 as part of an effort to reposition the pub with a stronger emphasis on food service. Later in 2024 the business was taken over by a new partnership of Rupert Hill and his business partner Jonny Booth, who also own the Castle Hotel. They carried out internal refurbishment and relaunched the pub under the trading name Lloyd and Platt.

Behind the pub is a crown bowling green that has been used for much of its history by the Lloyd Hotel Bowling Club, founded in 1870, around the time the original hotel was built.

== Architecture ==
The building is constructed of red brick with pale stone detailing, has chimneys on the side walls and a roof covered in slate. Its layout is irregular, with the original rectangular section set on the corner of Wilbraham Road and Manchester Road, and a later block added at the back overlooking the adjoining crown bowling green. (Note: Historic England describes the building as standing between Wilbraham Road and "Whitelow Road (formerly Manchester Road)". This reflects the historic name of that short section of Whitelow Road, which formed part of the longer Manchester Road in the 19th century. The present‑day Manchester Road is a separate route. The public house now fronts onto it, while the only opening onto Whitelow Road is a service access leading to the car park of an adjacent block of flats rather than to the pub itself.)

The Wilbraham Road elevation has three bays, including a full‑height angled bay window on the left. The central entrance has a panelled door beneath a bracketed flat canopy. To the right, windows are arranged above and below a projecting chimney that carries a carved stone plaque with the Lloyd family coat of arms at its base.

The Manchester Road front has two storeys and five window bays, with the earlier three‑bay section on the left. The main entrance sits in the centre, reached by steps. The doorway has double doors and a wide window above it, all sheltered by a flat canopy held up by large stone brackets. The canopy continues leftwards to form a small balcony for the upper windows. Above the entrance is a single window, with a three‑part window to its right. To the left of the doorway is a tall, curved bay window running the full height of the building, marked by stone bands and a wider band carrying the raised lettering "LLOYD AND PLATT". The right‑hand end has a three‑part ground‑floor window and a dormer with a half‑hipped roof. All windows are sash types without glazing bars. The roofline is supported by deep brick and stone brackets. A lower section to the right has two tall upper‑floor windows on either side of a projecting chimney.

The main three‑bay section overlooking the bowling green has an open ground floor with cast‑iron columns supporting the upper storey. Above is a central oriel window with a lead‑covered canopy and a small gable. On either side are paired sash windows beneath a shallow eaves line with small dentils. To the right, a late‑20th‑century external stair gives access to an altered side wall. To the left is a single‑storey clubhouse with a hipped slate roof, a central doorway and sash windows on either side.

== See also ==
- Listed buildings in Manchester-M21
- Listed pubs in Manchester
