= Ashby (automobile) =

The Ashby was a cyclecar produced in Towcester, Northamptonshire, and Chorlton-cum-Hardy, Lancashire, between 1919 and 1924 by Victor Ashby and Son, who owned a garage in Towcester with manufacturing capabilities.

After returning from the First World War the younger Victor Ashby designed a cyclecar that came to the attention of aeroplane makers Short Brothers. Short Brothers employed six Ashby staff members, with the car being known as the Short-Ashby in 1921. Short Brothers withdrew their support in 1922 owing to poor sales. The Ashbys then moved to Chorlton-cum-Hardy, where production of a two-seater light car powered by a 970 cc 8 hp engine, three-speed gearbox or four-ratio friction drive, continued until 1924.
