= Philip Baybutt =

Union Army soldier in the American Civil War, Medal of Honor recipient

Philip J. Baybutt
- Born: November 22, 1844; Manchester, England
- Died: April 17, 1907 (aged 62); Lancashire, England
- Burial place: Southern Cemetery Chorlton-cum-Hardy, England
- Military career
- Allegiance: United States of America
- Branch: United States Army; Union Army
- Service years: 1864–1865
- Rank: Private
- Unit: 2nd Regiment Massachusetts Volunteer Cavalry
- Conflicts: American Civil War Valley Campaigns of 1864
- Awards: Medal of Honor

Philip James Baybutt (November 22, 1844 – April 17, 1907) was a Union Army soldier during the American Civil War. He received the Medal of Honor for gallantry during the Valley Campaigns of 1864 for action at Luray, Virginia, on September 24, 1864, becoming the first British citizen recipient of the award.

While visiting his brother in the United States, Baybutt joined the US Army from Fall River, Massachusetts, in February 1864, and mustered out with his regiment in July 1865.

== Biography ==
Born in Manchester in 1844, he journeyed to Fall River, Massachusetts, America, to visit his brother, but he joined the Union Army when war broke out. The nonconformist working class community in his native city were strongly opposed to slavery, and this opposition continued despite the hardships resulting from the Union blockade and the consequent 'cotton famine'. Philip fought in eight major battles and was seriously wounded twice as two of his horses were shot beneath him. He was awarded the American equivalent of the Victoria Cross after snatching the enemy flag while fighting for Company A (The California 100) of the 2nd Massachusetts Cavalry. When he returned to Britain, he had eight children but never fully recovered from his injuries and died in 1907, aged 62.

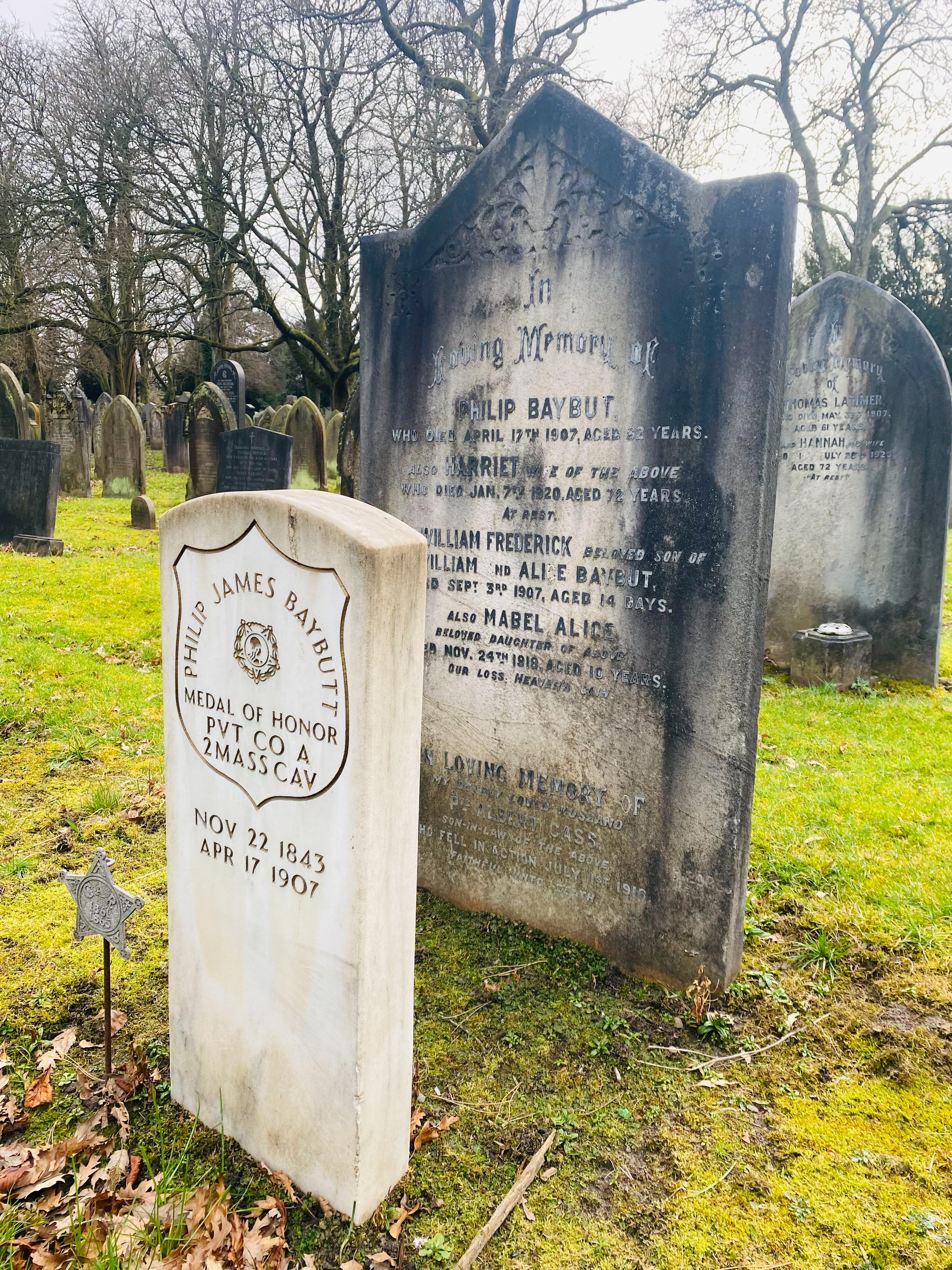
Philip Baybutt's grave in Southern Cemetery, Manchester

Baybutt was buried in Southern Cemetery, Manchester. His headstone made no mention of his involvement in the American Civil War. In 2002, Baybutt's granddaughter unveiled a commemorative headstone citing Baybutt award of the Medal of Honour at a ceremony held on the 138th anniversary of the Battle of Fisher’s Hill.

== Medal of Honor citation ==
"The President of the United States of America, in the name of Congress, takes pleasure in presenting the Medal of Honor to Private Philip Baybutt, United States Army, for extraordinary heroism on 24 September 1864, while serving with Company A, 2d Massachusetts Cavalry, in action at Luray, Virginia, for capture of flag."

== See also ==
- List of Medal of Honor recipients
- List of American Civil War Medal of Honor recipients: A–F
