= Parks and open spaces in Chorlton-cum-Hardy =

Coordinates: 53.4346°N 2.2714°W

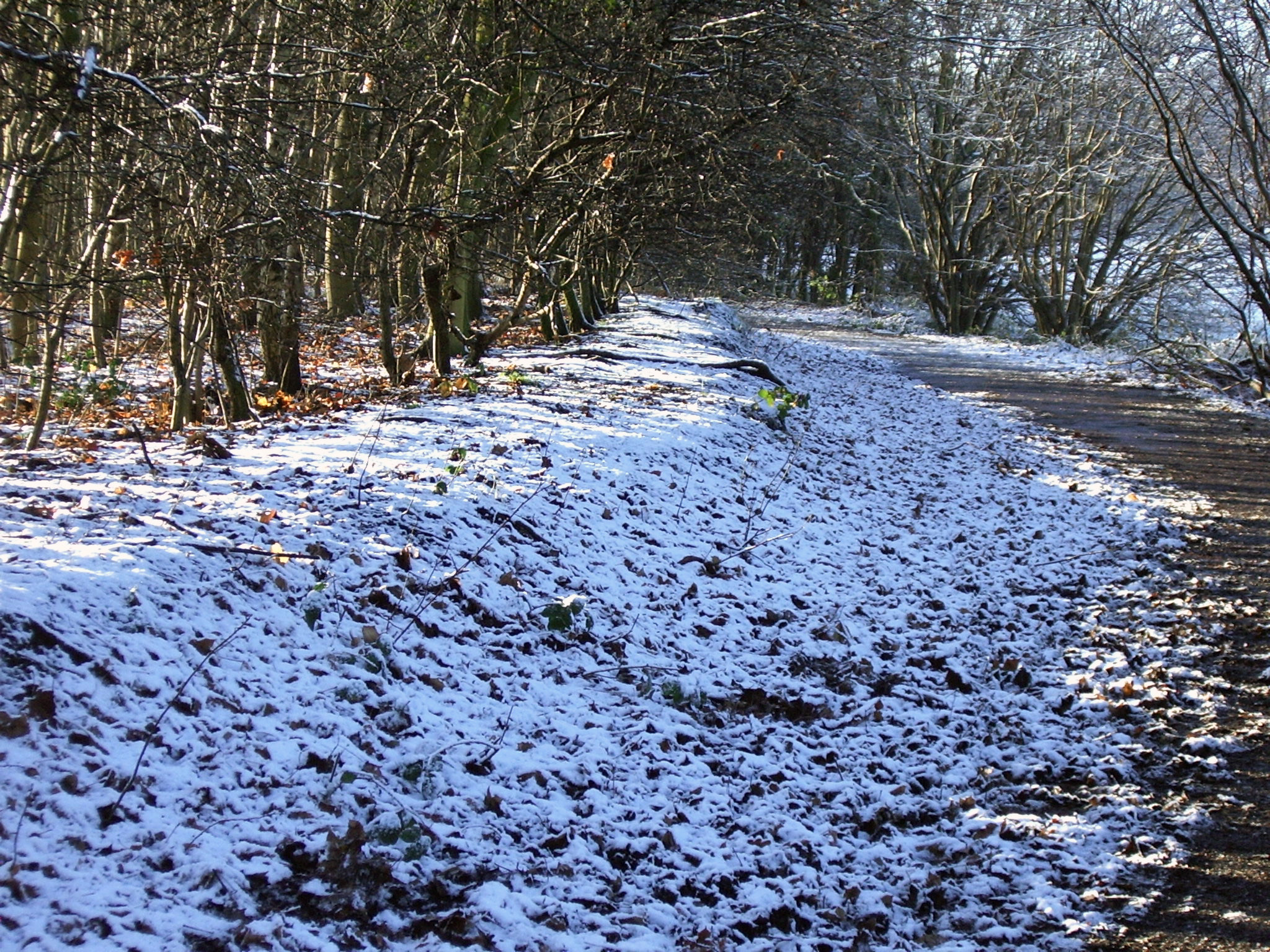
Hawthorn Road, Stretford

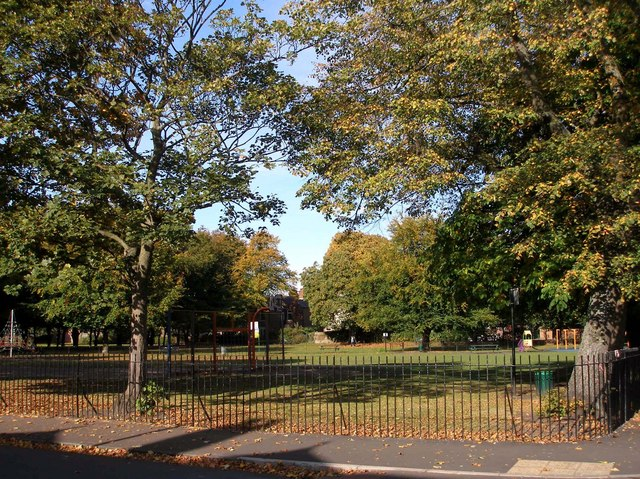
Beech Road Park

Parks, water parks and other open spaces in Chorlton-cum-Hardy, Manchester, include the following.

- Stretford Stadium, within Longford Park, is the home of Trafford Athletic Club. Most of the area of the park is in Stretford but the eastern part is in Chorlton with an entrance on Ryebank Road. Also in the park are tennis courts and bowling greens. Nearby are Ryebank Fields and to the south the area around Turn Moss towards the River Mersey.
- An area of Chorlton Park was used many centuries ago for horse racing. The park is now the largest municipal park in Chorlton and has sports facilities and many mature trees.
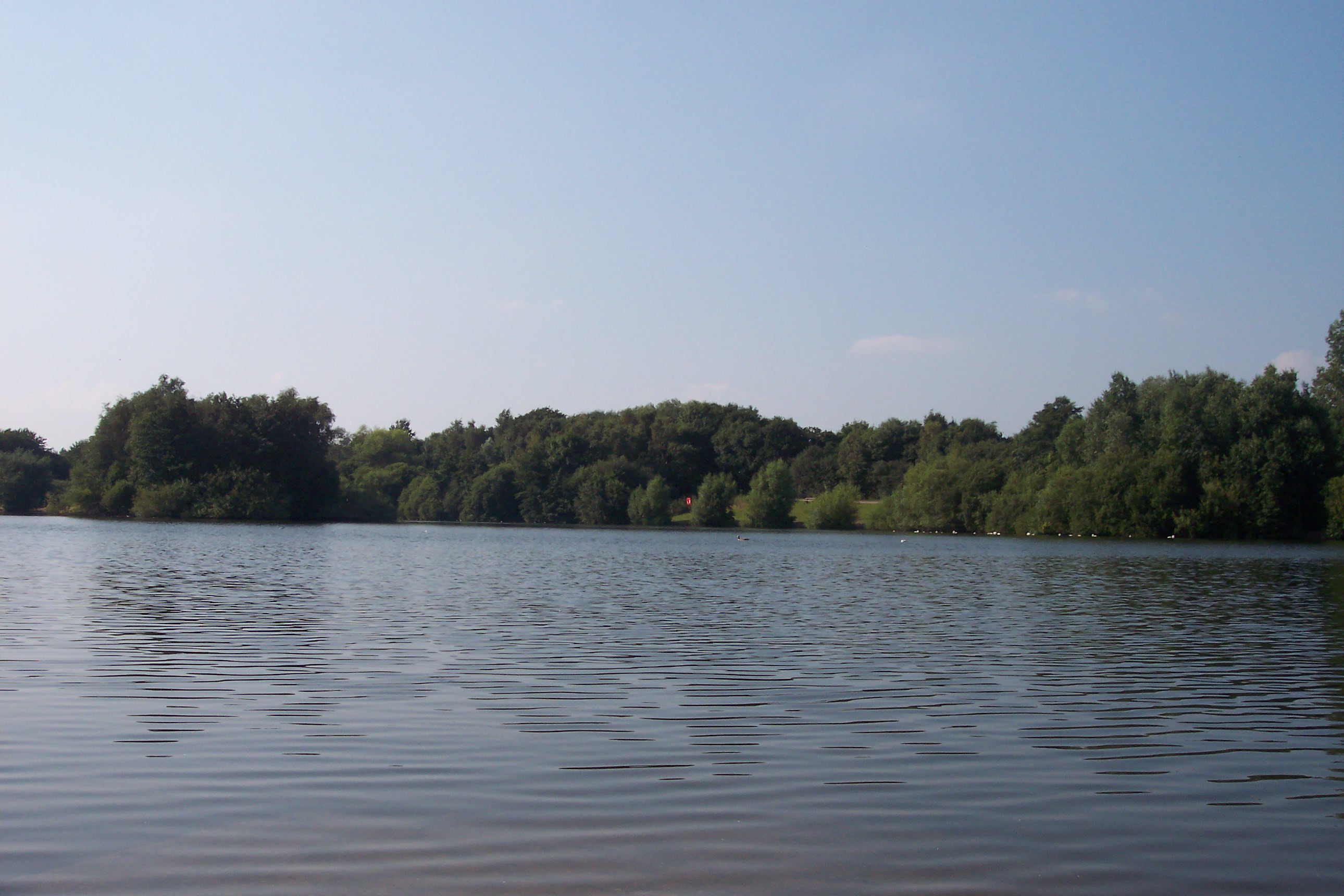
- Chorlton Water Park
  The Recreation Ground (Beech Park) was opened in 1896 having been donated to the community by Lord Egerton. It used to be a location of the Beech Road Festival which formerly attracted upwards of 10,000 people each year.
- Chorlton Water Park is on the north side of the Mersey: access from southern Chorlton is via Maitland Avenue. It may be reached from the southern banks of the River Mersey by a footbridge.
