= Hough End Hall =

Listed building in Manchester, England

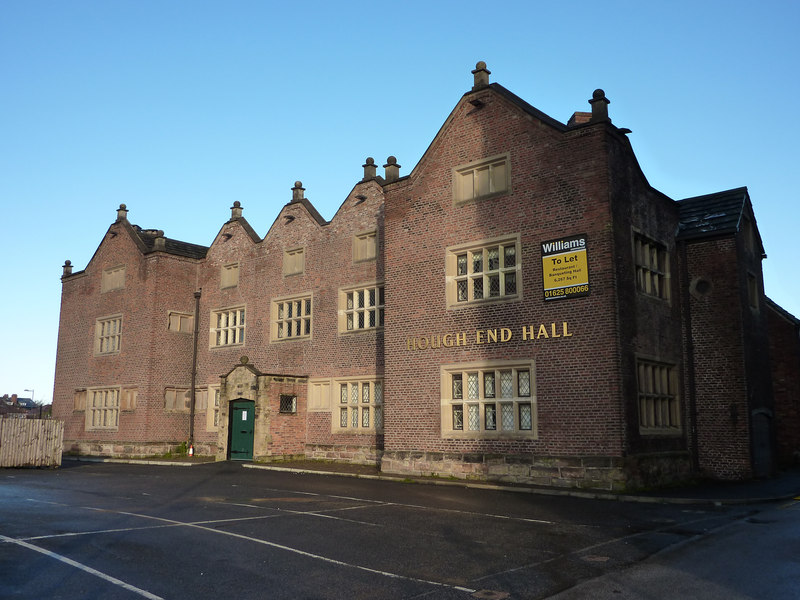
- Hough End Hall in 2012

- Location within Greater Manchester

General information
- Type: Mansion
- Architectural style: Elizabethan
- Location: Nell Lane, Chorlton-cum-Hardy, Manchester, England
- Coordinates: 53.4358°N 2.2650°W
- Completed: 1596
- Client: Nicholas Mosley

Design and construction
- Designations

Listed Building – Grade II*
- Official name: Hough End Hall
- Designated: 25 February 1952
- Reference no.: 1283002

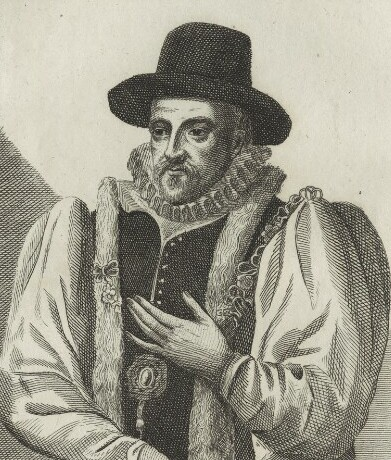
Sir Nicholas Mosley as Lord Mayor of London

Hough End Hall is a late 16th‑century house on Nell Lane in Chorlton-cum-Hardy, originally part of the township of Withington in Manchester, England. Built in 1596 for Sir Nicholas Mosley after he became Lord of the Manor of Manchester and of Withington, it is one of the few surviving manor houses of its period in the area. The Mosley family remained influential locally for several centuries.

The building has had varied uses over time, including as a toolhouse, a blacksmith's shop and a farmhouse, and has undergone substantial alteration. By the early 20th century many original fittings had been removed, and the surrounding estate later formed part of Alexandra Park Aerodrome between 1917 and 1924. Hough End Hall was designated a Grade II* listed building in 1952.

The hall now stands within a landscape of modern development and public recreational facilities. In 2015 it was purchased by a local group and is currently used as an academy and mosque.

== History ==
The house has served various functions in its earlier history, including as a toolhouse, a blacksmith's shop and a farmhouse. Over time it underwent significant alteration, with new windows and structural changes. The original oak, nail‑studded back door now stands inside the building, and a five‑light window on the return of the staircase bay was later blocked and is visible only from within. By the early 20th century the interior had lost its original oak fittings, and a staircase at the east end was removed by Lord Egerton to Tatton Hall.

In 1917, land from the Hough End estate to the north-east of the hall and north of the Midland Railway line was taken over by the War Department for Alexandra Park Aerodrome, which operated until 1924. The site is now used as a public recreational area.

On 25 February 1952, Hough End Hall was designated a Grade II* listed building.

In the later 20th century and beyond, the hall became surrounded by large concrete office blocks that partly obscure it from view. Parts of the former aerodrome grounds now accommodate the Greater Manchester Police horse and dog training centre, the Hough End Centre, Broughton Park RUFC's ground and Hough End Playing Fields, including the site of the swimming pool for Chorlton-cum-Hardy and Withington.

A fundraising campaign by The Friends of Hough End Hall sought to convert the building into a community centre. In late 2015 a local group purchased the property, announcing plans to name it Hough End Hall Academy and use it for educational purposes. It now operates as an academy and mosque.

== Architecture ==
The building is constructed of brown brick with stone details and a stone‑slate roof. Its layout forms an H‑shape and it has two and a half storeys with a balanced front of one window, then three, then one. The main entrance sits in the centre, now sheltered by a 20th‑century porch. The ground floor has large modern windows divided into 10 panes, with slightly smaller eight‑pane versions above. The attic has blocked window openings with stone surrounds, two in the central section and three in each side wing. Traces of much smaller original stone‑framed windows survive in several places, including both ends of the main ground floor, the inner corner of the left wing on both levels, and either side of the ground‑floor window in that wing.

Each window is topped by a raised gable with a finial and stone coping. The left side wall carries two very large chimney stacks, each with a pair of diagonal flues, with a 20th‑century porch set between them. The right side has a tall gabled projection that once formed a chimney stack; it includes a small ground‑floor opening for moving goods, two two‑pane windows above, and a circular opening on the left side. At the back, the roofline forms four uneven gables, with some rebuilt sections and replacement windows.

Inside, most of the layout has been altered, but the west end still contains two large inglenook fireplaces with heavy timber lintels. Parts of the former hall fireplace also remain in what was once the rear wall. The back door aligns with the front door and is of a similar design.

== Location ==
Hough End Hall stands on Nell Lane, just north-east of Barlow Moor Road. Behind it runs the Metrolink line to East Didsbury and Manchester Airport, and Chorlton Brook passes along its northern side (Mauldeth Road West runs past it on the south).

== See also ==
- Grade II* listed buildings in Greater Manchester
- Listed buildings in Manchester-M21
