= Chorlton-cum-Hardy =

Suburban area of Manchester, England

Coordinates: 53.442°N 2.277°W

Chorlton-cum-Hardy: Chorlton
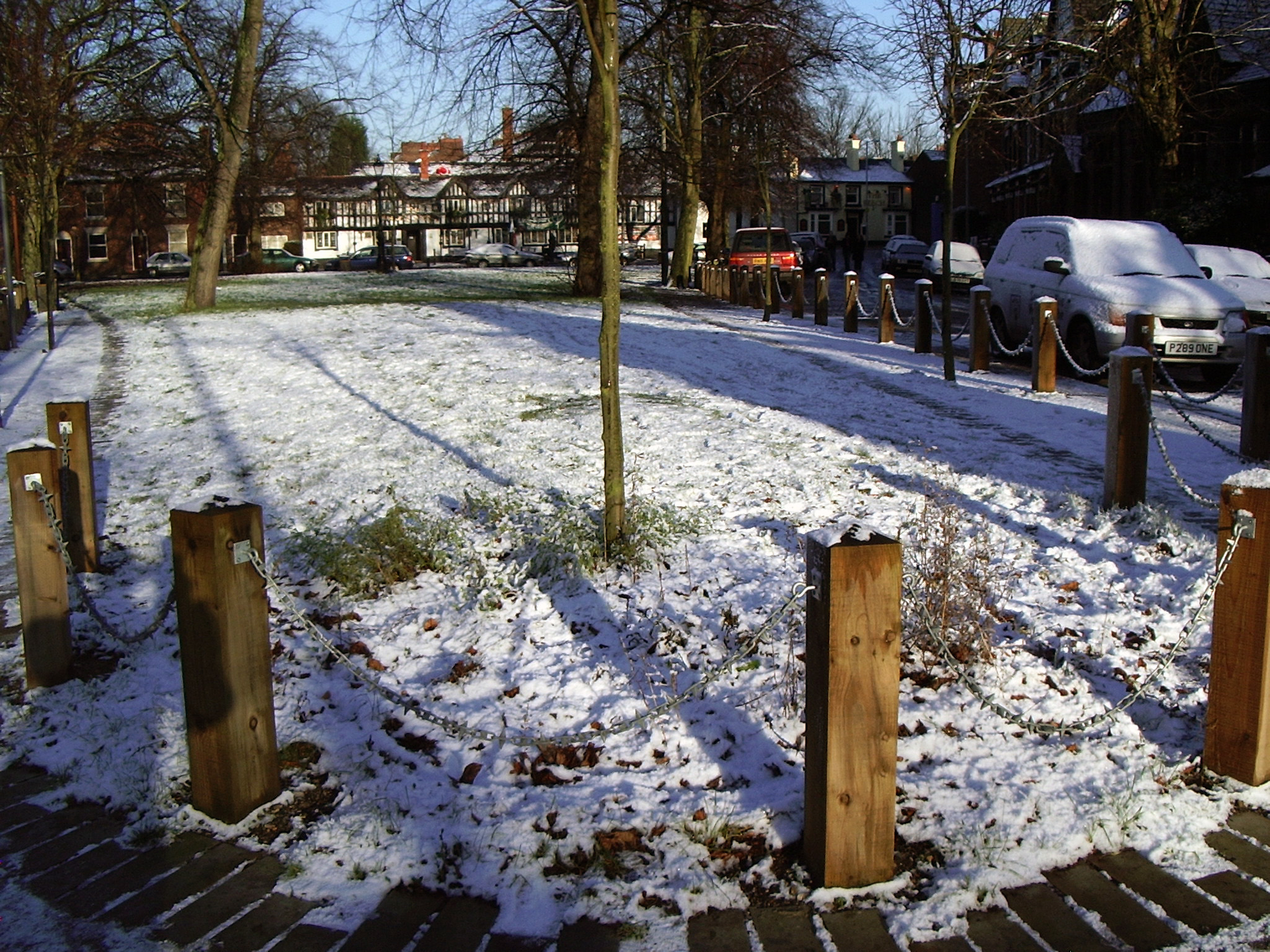
- Chorlton Green

- Location within Greater Manchester
- Population: 14,138 (2011)
- OS grid reference: SJ815935
  - London: 180 miles
- Metropolitan borough: Manchester
- Metropolitan county: Greater Manchester
- Region: North West
- Country: England
- Sovereign state: United Kingdom
- Post town: MANCHESTER
- Postcode district: M21
- Dialling code: 0161
- Police: Greater Manchester
- Fire: Greater Manchester
- Ambulance: North West
- UK Parliament: Manchester Withington

Chorlton-cum-Hardy is a suburban area of Manchester, England, three miles (4.8 km) southwest of the city centre. Chorlton ward had a population of 14,138 at the 2011 census, and Chorlton Park 15,147.

By the 9th century, there was an Anglo-Saxon settlement here. In the Middle Ages, improved drainage methods led to population growth. In the late Victorian and Edwardian periods, its rural character made it popular among the middle class. The loss of its railway station, the conversion of larger houses into flats or bedsitters, and significant social housing development to the south of the area changed its character again in the 1970s. Chorlton Manchester Metrolink tram stop was built on the site of the former railway station, served by East Didsbury and Manchester Airport trams.

Chorlton was a village on Lancashire's southern border with Cheshire, and a township within the ancient parish of Manchester. It was incorporated into the city of Manchester in 1904. Chorlton borders Stretford, Sale, Didsbury, Withington, and Whalley Range. The River Mersey runs along its southern boundary. The area's eastern boundary has changed since the 19th century because of incorporation into the City of Manchester and division into wards. (Note: Historically, the area east of Chorlton was also in the Manor of Withington, later divided into Withington and Moss Side Urban Districts, within which the suburbs of Whalley Range and Alexandra Park developed during the late 19th century. The ward, postal district and ecclesiastical parish boundaries do not always correspond. The western boundary with Stretford has remained substantially the same.)

== History ==
=== Toponymy ===
Chorlton probably means Ceolfrith's farm or settlement from the Old English personal name and tūn, an enclosure, farmstead or village. Hardy is derived from a personal name, Hearda, and ēg, Anglian for island or dry ground in a well-watered land. It has alternatively been suggested that Hardy may mean "by the woods", in reference to the ancient forest of Arden Wood that grew on both sides of the River Mersey in the area. Chorlton was recorded as Chollirton in 1250, Chollerton from 1292 and as Chourton in 1572. It was also noted down as Chawerton on a map of the Salford Hundred by John Speed in 1610.

The ancient hamlets of Chorlton and Hardy, separated by the Chorlton Brook, together with Martledge and Barlow Moor, did not come under the combined name of Chorlton-cum-Hardy (cum is Latin for "with") until the 18th century; local historian Cliff Hayes reports that he can find no mention of Chorlton-cum-Hardy before 1700. The name was adopted by Victorian property developers who arrived in the wake of the coming of the railway in 1880, to distinguish this Chorlton from Chorlton-on-Medlock. The form Chorlton with Hardy was used to some extent from the early 19th century onwards and in the early years of the 20th.

=== Early history ===
The district was part of the kingdom of Northumbria from the 7th century, but settlement in the Mersey valley may well have been later. Thomas L. Ellwood suggested 610 AD as the date of founding the settlement, (Note: John Lloyd says this may have been because John Whitaker gave this date as being when "the district south of Manchester was disencumbered of its ancient oaks".) but John Lloyd in his 1972 history considered the period 610 to 900 AD more likely.

The area now known as Chorlton-cum-Hardy comprises the ancient settlements of Chorlton along with Hardy and Barlow to the south on the north side of the Mersey and Martledge, the area around the present-day public library, to the north of Chorlton and Hardy. Chorlton was part of the Withington manor. Hardy was little more than a farm and a few houses, but Barlow was home to the family of that name, who occupied the manor house of Barlow Hall for several hundred years. Barlow Hall was built on a defensive site on rising ground on the north bank of the Mersey. (Note: Barlow Hall is now the clubhouse for Chorlton-cum-Hardy Golf Club.) In 1567 the lord of the manor was Alexander Barlow, a staunch recusant who was imprisoned for his beliefs and died in 1584 leaving a son who held similar beliefs. Two of his sons entered the Order of Saint Benedict, one of them, Ambrose Barlow a missionary priest in the Leigh parish, was imprisoned several times and executed for his priesthood in 1641 at Lancaster. Two sons of the papist, Anthony Barlow were charged with treason in the Jacobite rising of 1715. The estate remained with the family until the death of Thomas Barlow in 1773, when it was sold to the Egertons of Tatton Hall. In 1666 Barlow Hall was one of the largest houses paying hearth tax in the Withington manor.

The estimated population in 1640 was 85; in 1714 it was 325. The 1801 census recorded 513 inhabitants, and the 1811 census 619: by 1851 it had increased to 761. The Tithe Commissioners' survey carried out in 1841 provides details of the size and tenure of every piece of land. The tithe map reveals the township had two major landowners: Wilbraham Egerton of Tatton owned 888 acres and George Lloyd 231, the rest was shared between 21 others. Most land was meadow and pasture while 490 acres was arable. Many small landowners owned orchards or market gardens. At this time the village consisted of its ancient halls and scattered farms centred on Chorlton Green and Beech Road and a few buildings on Barlow Moor Road. Its public houses were the Bowling Green, built in 1693, and the Horse and Jockey, which was licensed in the early 19th century.

Marl had been dug in Martledge since at least 1598; the disused pits filled with water gave the area its common name of the Isles. The Chorlton Brick Company was established there in the early part of the 20th century and continued producing bricks for about forty years. Turf-cutting was a significant industry in Martledge, as well as in the White Moss and Jackson's Moss areas.

=== Suburban growth ===
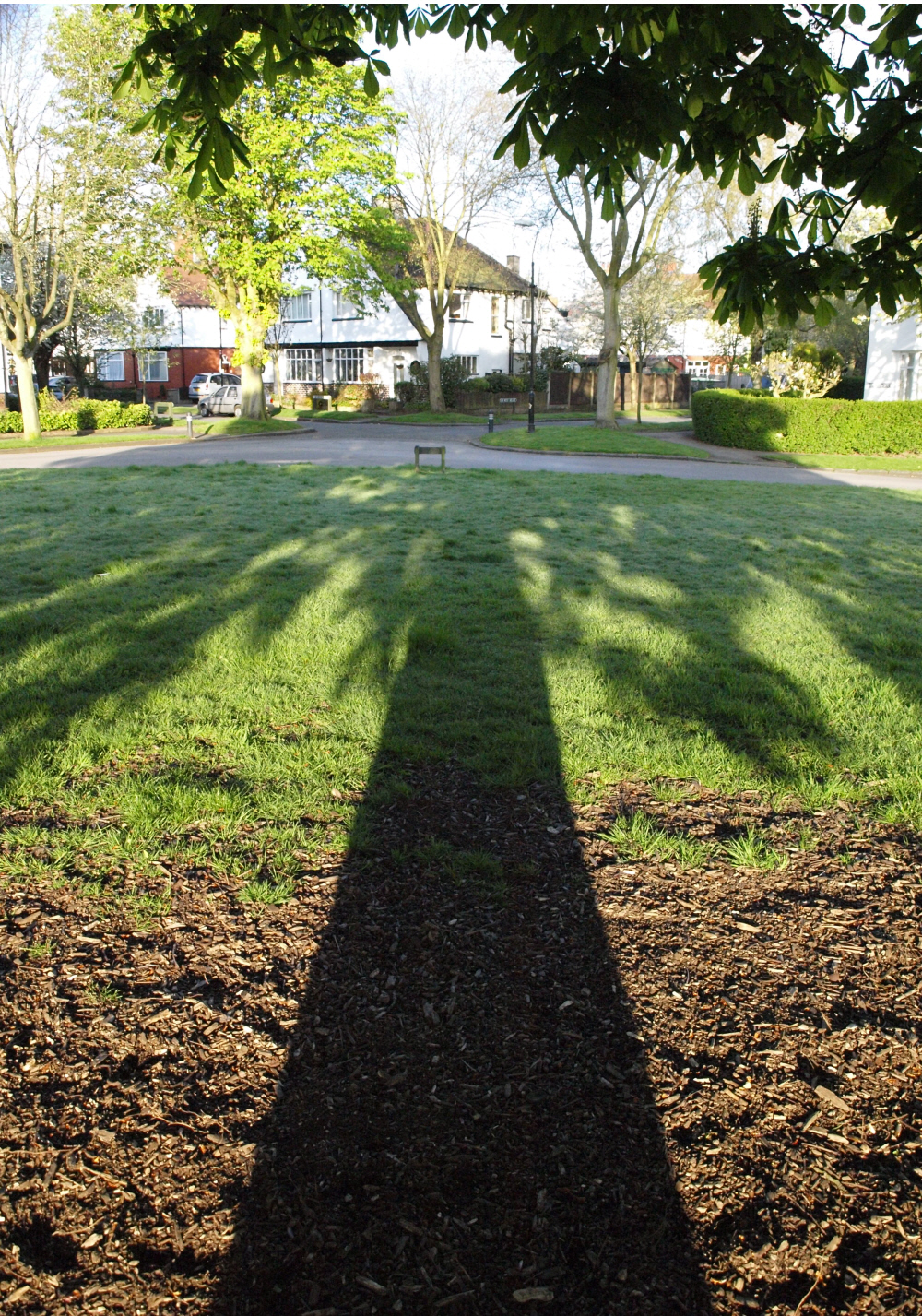
The Meade in Chorltonville

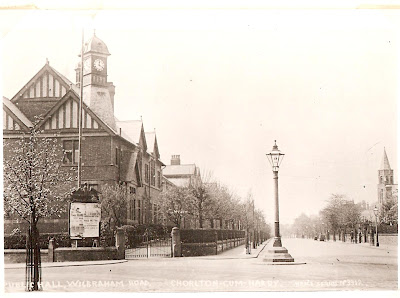
Wilbraham Road in the 1920s; on the left is the Conservative Club (also known as the Public Hall; built 1891-92)

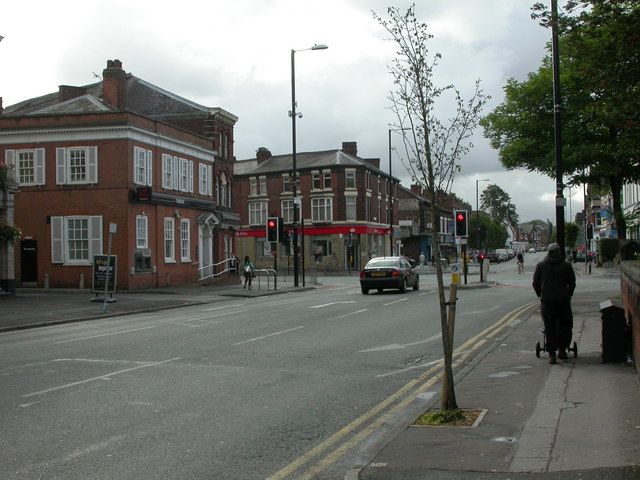
Barlow Moor Road, Chorlton; on the left is the NatWest Bank; Wilbraham Road crosses here

Until the last quarter of the 19th century, Chorlton's population had increased slowly. When the railway reached neighbouring Stretford in 1849, upmarket villas were built on a flood-free area in Edge Lane and High Lane. Wilbraham Road was built in 1869 to connect the Egerton holdings across Withington from Edge Lane to Fallowfield. The Midland Railway built a line from Manchester Central through Chorlton station which opened on 1 January 1880. Over the following decade land close to the station was developed for residential and commercial purposes centred on the Barlow Moor Road/Wilbraham Road crossroads, northeast of the old village centre. Houses built in the 1880s attracted more affluent residents who worked in Manchester city centre to high quality homes in a more rural area. Now that there were two centres reference was sometimes made to Old Chorltonians and New Chorltonians for their respective residents.

Irish immigrants came to work in the expanding industries of Manchester, in small-scale horticulture and farming and domestic service. They brought Roman Catholicism, and by the first decade of the 20th century a church (St Augustine's) and convent school had been established on High Lane.

Further growth was aided by the arrival of Manchester Corporation's tramway before the First World War: a terminus was built on Barlow Moor Road a short distance south of the junction with High Lane. Chorltonville was developed as a garden suburb south of Chorlton Brook: the houses are mostly large and semi-detached and individual in design, standing on tree-lined roads. Alexandra Park Aerodrome (1917–24), was Manchester's first major airfield located east of the Midland Railway overbridge on Mauldeth Road West.

After the First World War came a period of residential development to the east of the new village on either side of Wilbraham Road and a council housing estate at Merseybank. The Ashby, a two-seater light car, was produced in Chorlton-cum-Hardy by Victor Ashby and Son from 1922 to 1924.

From the 1960s onwards a council estate at Nell Lane near Southern Cemetery and patchy redevelopment in other areas were completed. There has been immigration particularly from the Indian subcontinent and from Poland; the Polish community arrived in the 1950s and 1960s.

In 2025 a plan to redevelop the main Chorlton Cross shopping centre with 262 homes, in ten-, eight-, six-, and four-storey blocks was approved by Manchester City Council. This would have 56 one-, 135 two-, and 15 three-bedroom apartments at market rates and 16 one-bed and 33 two-bed flats at affordable rates managed by the Southway Housing Trust.

== Governance ==
=== Civic history ===
The district was a township and chapelry in the ancient parish of Manchester in the Salford hundred of Lancashire. The abolition of Withington's manorial rights in the 1840s meant that local government began to be formalised. Chorlton became part of Chorlton Poor Law Union (named after Chorlton-on-Medlock), in 1866 Chorlton cum Hardy became a separate civil parish, in 1894 it became part of Withington Urban District.

From 1876 to 1894 Chorlton was part of the district administered by the Withington Local Board, and from 1894 to 1904 part of Withington Urban District. It was absorbed into the County Borough of Manchester in August 1904, together with the rest of the urban district. A separate Withington Committee of the city council existed from 1904 until 1914. On 1 October 1910 the parish was abolished and merged with South Manchester. In 1901 the parish had a population of 9026.

=== Boundary with Trafford ===
In 1987 the Local Government Boundary Commission for England revised the Manchester and Trafford boundary. The most notable differences for Chorlton-cum-Hardy were that Stretford Stadium was now actually in Stretford, and the Jackson's Boat pub in Sale. Other minor adjustments were made in the Turn Moss area.

=== Political representation ===
Since the 1970s both of the wards have been in the Manchester Withington parliamentary constituency. Until then Chorlton ward had been in the Manchester Moss Side parliamentary constituency. In the 2015 general election, the Labour Party's Jeff Smith won the seat with 57.3% of the vote unseating the incumbent Liberal Democrat candidate John Leech. Smith was reelected in the 2019 general election and again in 2024.

Most of Chorlton is divided into two wards, Chorlton and Chorlton Park, which includes the Mersey Bank and Nell Lane estates of south and south-east Chorlton. The remainder of the area is included in the Whalley Range ward. As of 2019, each of the three wards is represented by three Labour councillors.

== Public services ==
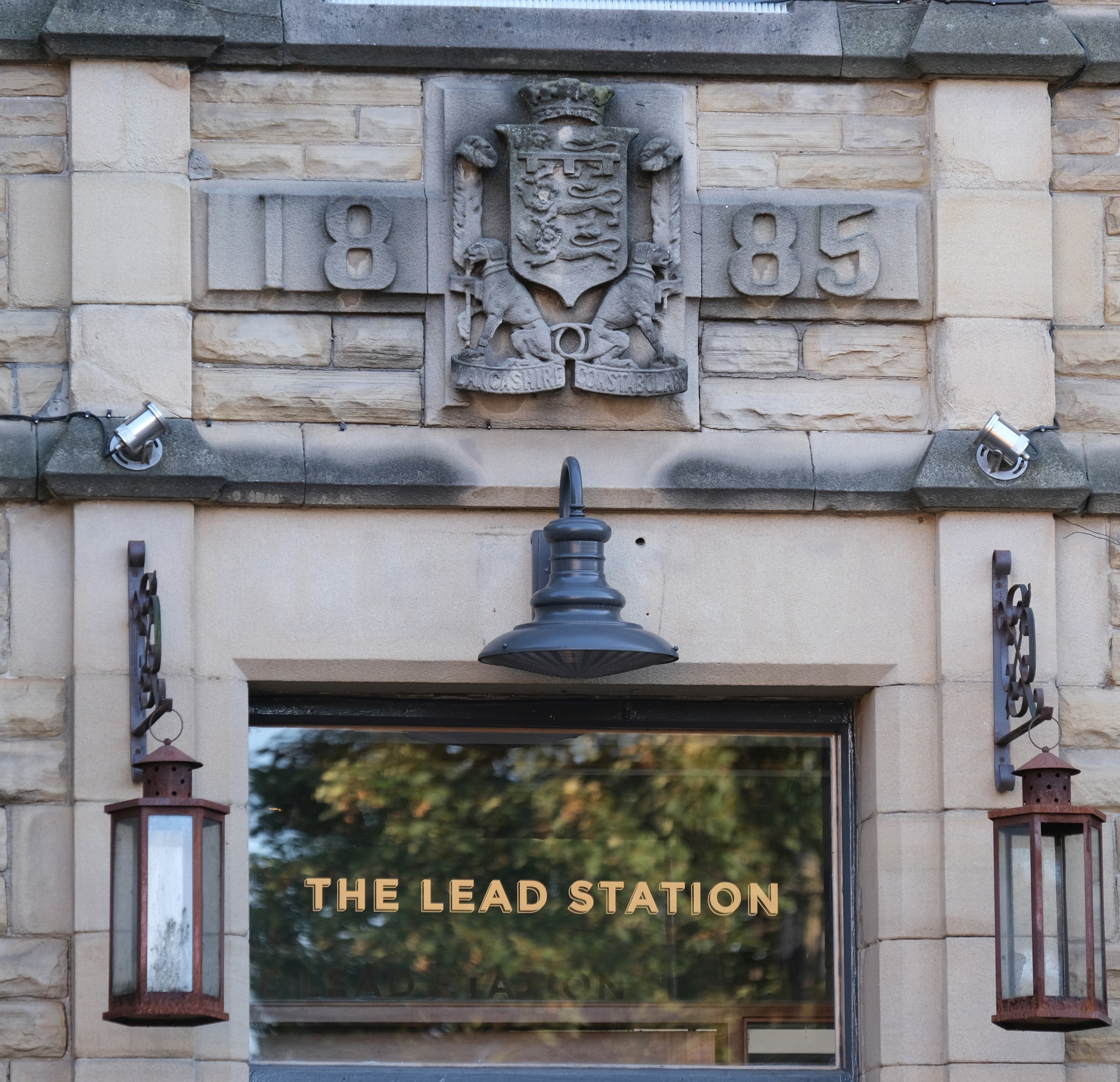
The datestone of Chorlton's first police station, in Beech Road (Lancashire Constabulary)

Policing in Chorlton-cum-Hardy is the responsibility of the Greater Manchester Police (GMP); the suburb is in the GMP's South Manchester Division. Chorlton Police Station was situated on Barlow Moor Road, between Beech Road and the bus station, until it closed in October 2011. The first police station was established in Beech Road in 1885 by the Lancashire Constabulary and was replaced by the one, now closed, on Barlow Moor Road in the 1960s.

Waste management is co-ordinated by the local authority via the Greater Manchester Waste Disposal Authority.

== Geography ==
Chorlton-cum-Hardy

Climate chart (precipitation, max. and min. temperature)
J	F	M	A	M	J	J	A	S	O	N	D
70 8 2	70 8 2	50 10 3	63 13 5	51 16 8	58 19 10	54 21 12	69 21 12	63 18 10	88 14 7	82 10 4	78 7 2
- █ Average max. and min. temperatures in °C
- █ Precipitation totals in mm
- Source: World Weather Online
Imperial conversion
J	F	M	A	M	J	J	A	S	O	N	D
2.8 46 36	2.8 46 36	2 50 37	2.5 55 41	2 61 46	2.3 66 50	2.1 70 54	2.7 70 54	2.5 64 50	3.5 57 45	3.2 50 39	3.1 45 36
- █ Average max. and min. temperatures in °F
- █ Precipitation totals in inches

The ancient township of Chorlton cum Hardy covered 1,280 acres (520 ha) of low-lying, flat land on the north bank of the River Mersey. In medieval times the district formed part of the Manor of Withington, an area stretching from Longford Park to Debdale Park and south to the Mersey. The highest land is at the south-east end, where it reaches a little over 100 feet (30 m) OD. It is divided by the Chorlton Brook, which runs east to west to its confluence with the Mersey. Chorlton grew north of the brook; the hamlets of Barlow and Hardy were on the southern part, which stretches along the north bank of the Mersey for two miles (3.2 km). Because the county boundary was determined by the course of the Mersey, it traditionally did not exactly follow the river when it changed course: this happened occasionally in the period before improved flood control measures were introduced in the 1840s. The Manchester–Trafford boundary now follows the course of the river. Chorlton is surrounded by Stretford, Sale, Didsbury, Withington, and Whalley Range.

Chorlton's climate is generally temperate, with few extremes of temperature or weather. The mean temperature is slightly above average for the United Kingdom. Annual rainfall and average amount of sunshine are both slightly below the average for the UK.

Between Chorlton Brook and the river, Chorlton Ees Nature Reserve occupies the site of Withington sewage works which closed in 1972. The derelict site was restored and has a network of trails through its grassland and woodland. In the 1970s, gravel was extracted from the Mersey floodplain at Barlow Hall Farm and used in the construction of the M60 motorway. The area around the flooded gravel pit was restored as Chorlton Water Park and is now a Local Nature Reserve.

Chorltonville, a garden village covering 36 acres (15 ha), was developed in 1911 south of Chorlton Brook and became the home of professional classes who moved into the area.

== Demography ==
=== Population change ===
Population change in Chorlton-cum-Hardy
Year	1851	1861	1871	1881	1891	1901
Population	761	734	1,466	2,332	4,741	9,026
Source: A Vision of Britain through Time

== Economy ==
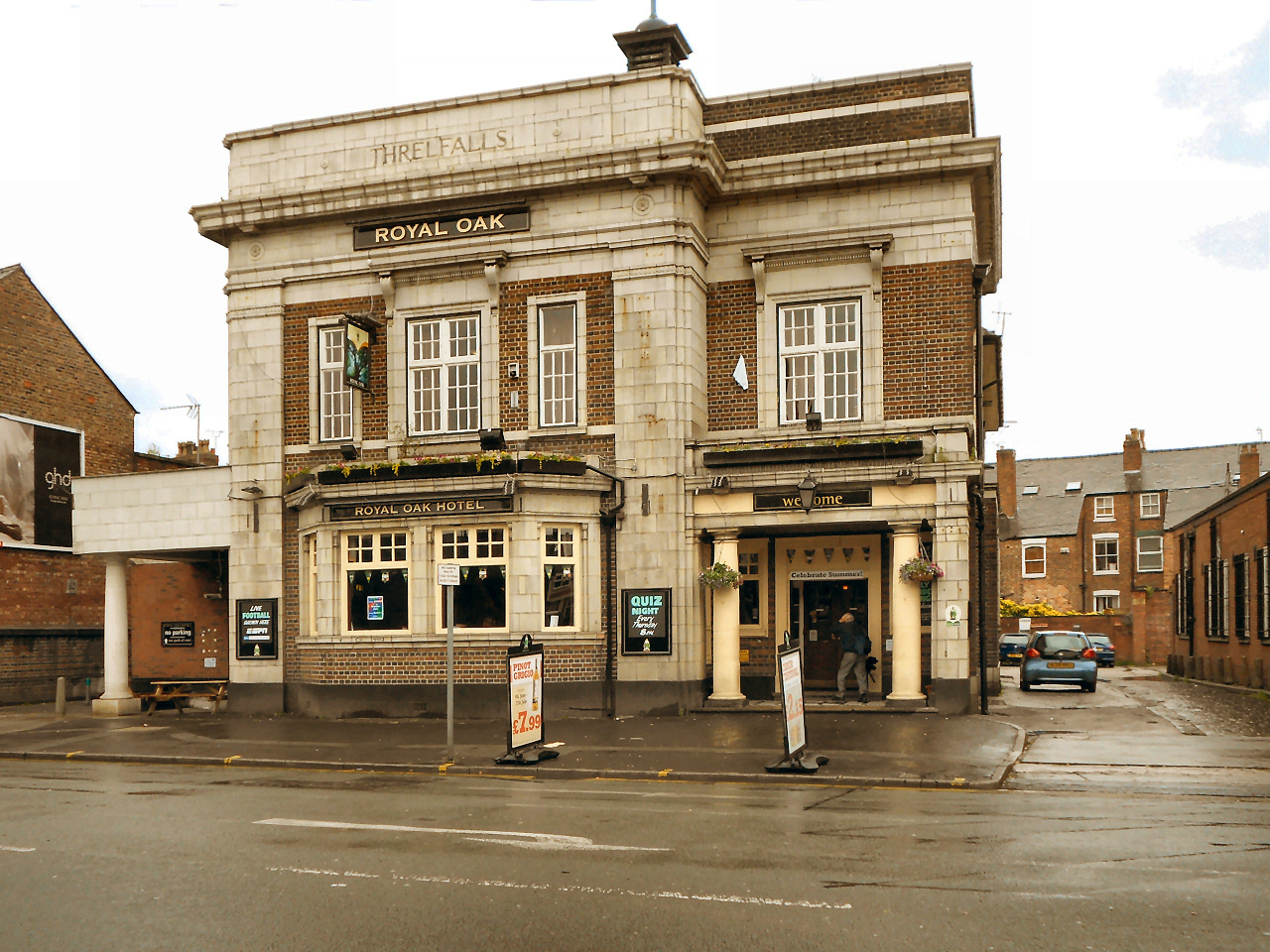
The Royal Oak pub, Barlow Moor Road

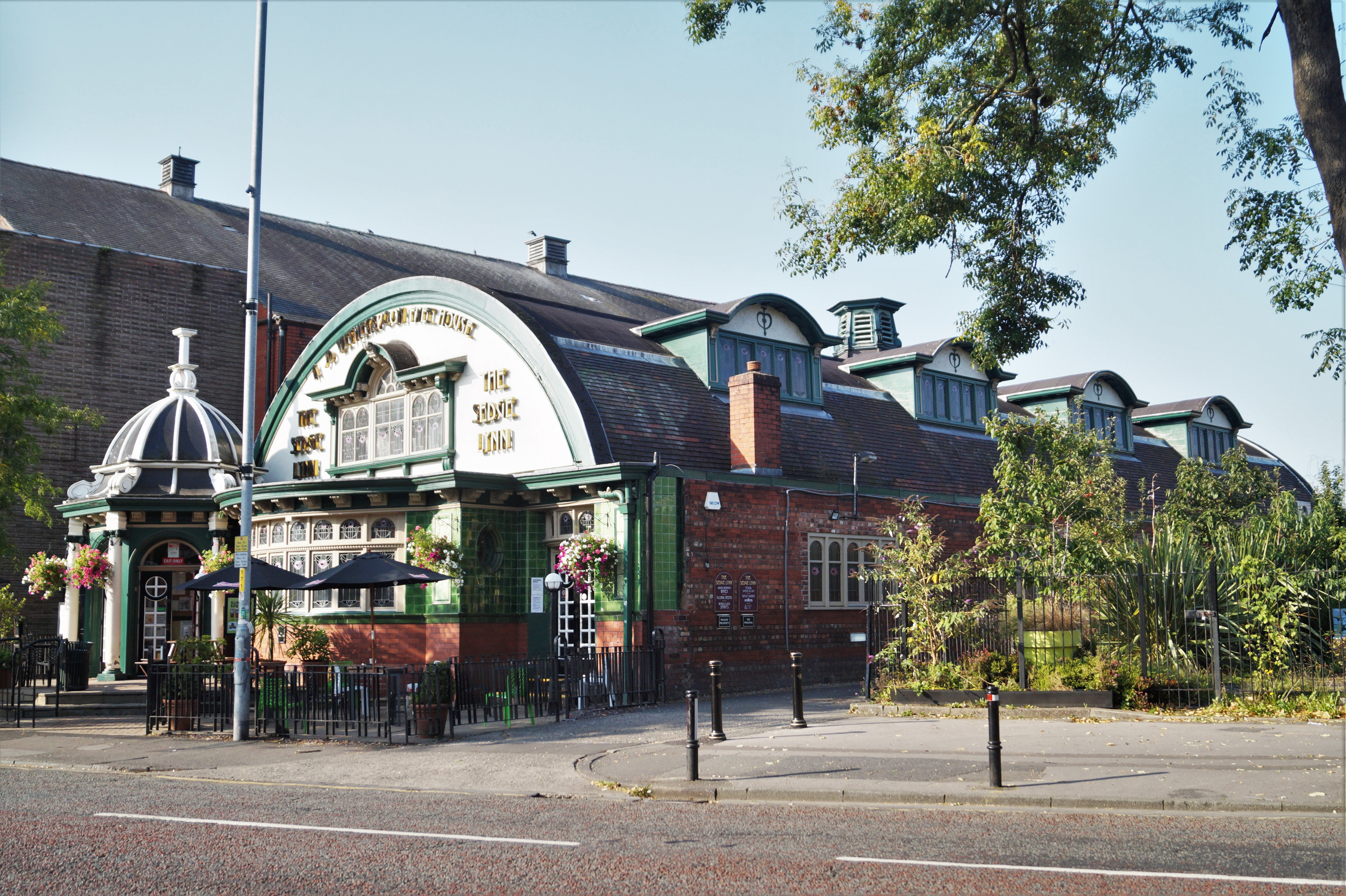
The Sedge Lynn pub, Manchester Road

Chorlton Precinct, built in the 1970s and rebranded as "The Square" in 2009, has been the subject of redevelopment plans. In 2010 Manchester City Council's South Manchester Regeneration Team issued an action plan for improvements to the "Chorlton District Centre" for the period 2010 to 2020. It proposes investment in the district aimed at creating "a strong, vibrant and successful centre that supports the local community and has the ability to exploit the economic potential of Metrolink". In 2023 plans were formulated to redevelop the site of the shopping centre, the office block Graeme House and the municipal car park at Nicolas Road. From April 2025 redevelopment plans were publicised in the "One Chorlton" campaign.

Government and public sector employers in Chorlton include the Department for Work and Pensions, Manchester Mental Health and Social Care, and Manchester Social Services. The district centre has a library, a health centre, three dentists and a bank. Four pubs, the Sedge Lynn, the Spread Eagle, the Royal Oak and the Lloyd and Platt's Hotel are sited in the centre of Chorlton; the Lloyd and Platt's Hotel has been designated a Grade II listed building since 3 April 2003.

In 2014 insurance claim figures revealed that the M21 postcode, encompassing Chorlton-cum-Hardy, was the most burgled postcode in the UK with 45.2 claims per 1,000 people.

== Landmarks ==
Manchester City Council designated Chorlton Green a conservation area in 1970 and Chorltonville in 1991.

=== Chorlton Library ===
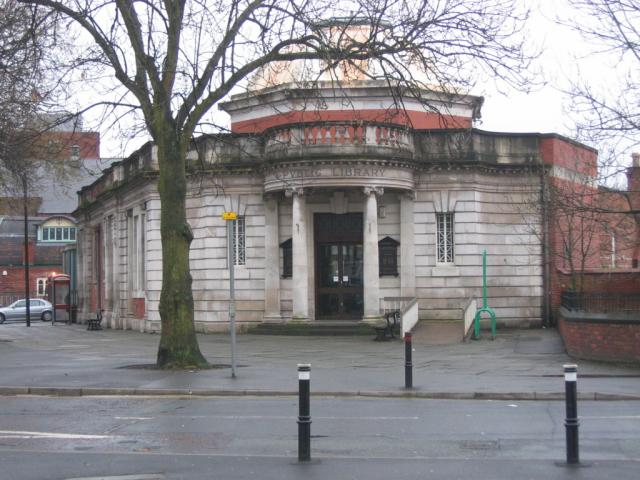
Chorlton Library

Chorlton Library was built in 1914 in Manchester Road to a design by Manchester City Council architect Henry Price. It was funded by a £5,000 donation from steel magnate and philanthropist Andrew Carnegie, one of about 3000 Carnegie libraries around the world. The single-story flat-roofed building is constructed of red brick dressed with Portland stone, and is designed in the Edwardian Baroque style.

In 2013 Manchester Council announced plans to sell the library after its reorganisation of the provision of leisure and library services in Chorlton into a new £5.7 million "joint service centre" to be built on the site of Chorlton shopping precinct. Fears that the library would then be demolished were allayed when on 21 August 2013 it was designated a Grade II listed building, following a campaign by local Liberal Democrat councillor Victor Chamberlain.

A renovation project designed to enhance and preserve the building was completed in 2025.

=== Southern Cemetery ===
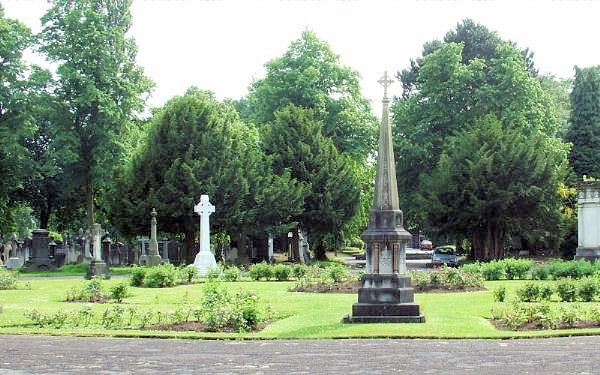
Southern Cemetery, Manchester

Southern Cemetery at its opening was the largest municipal cemetery in the United Kingdom and contains many notable burials, including industrialist John Rylands and broadcaster and music impresario Tony Wilson. The burial ground originally occupied 40 acres (16 ha) of land that cost Manchester Corporation £38,340 in 1872. Its cemetery buildings were designed by architect H J Paull and its layout is attributed to the city surveyor, James Gascoigne Lynde. The cemetery opened on 9 October 1879 and had mortuary chapels for Anglicans, Nonconformists, and Roman Catholics linked by an elliptical drive and a Jewish chapel at the west corner of the site. The original cemetery is registered by English Heritage in the Register of Historic Parks and Gardens for its historic interest and the mortuary chapels and other structures are listed buildings.

== Transport ==
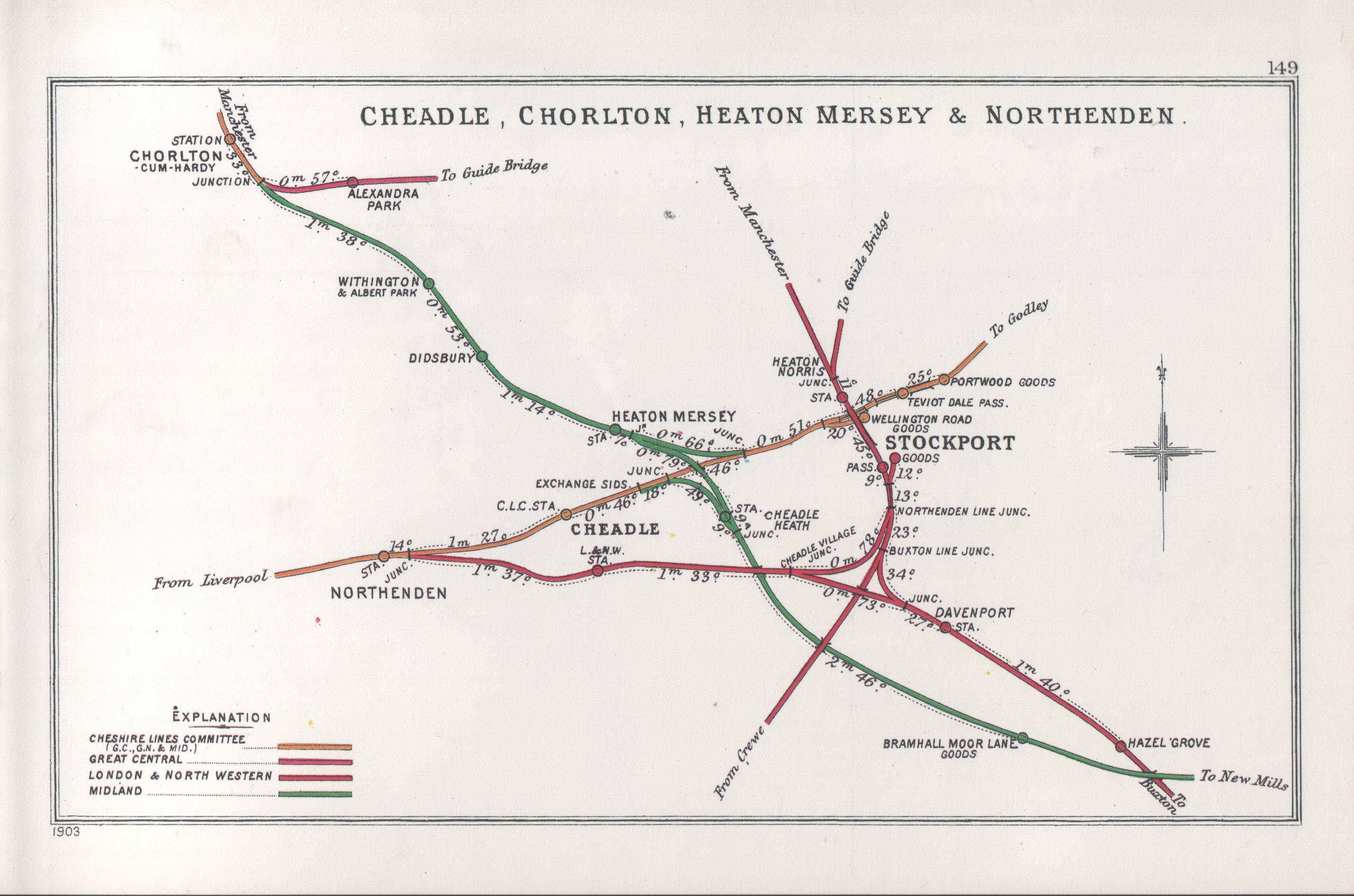
Railway Clearing House diagram of South Manchester railways c. 1914, showing (top) the location of the station north-west of Chorlton junction

In the 19th century, public transport was provided by the railway through the southern suburbs of Manchester and horse buses from Chorlton Green towards Manchester city centre. In the early 20th century the electric tramway reached Chorlton. Mauldeth Road West's dual-carriageway had a central strip intended for use as a double-track for electric trams. Trams remained in service until January 1949. Passenger railway services ended in 1967 when Chorlton-cum-Hardy station closed.

From 1992 conversion of the former railway line through Chorlton to a Metrolink line was planned, but failed to secure funding. Work started in 2010, and the line opened on 7 July 2011, providing residents with a rail journey into the city centre for the first time in 44 years. The tram stop is on the site of the old railway station. Services terminated one stop further south at St Werburgh's Road, on the site of the old Chorlton Junction signal box, but in 2013 services were extended to East Didsbury and in November 2014 to Manchester Airport

== Religion ==
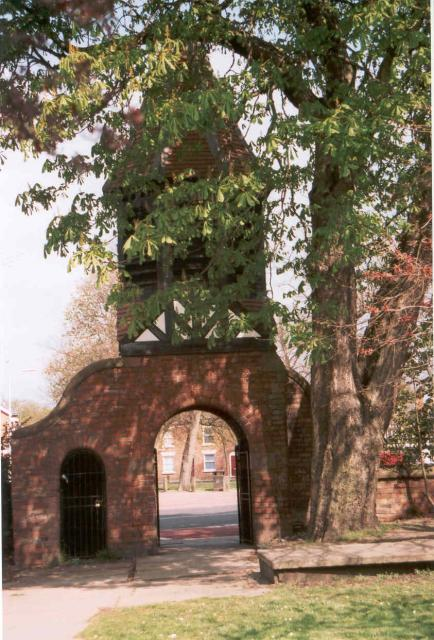
The lych gate, St Clement's old churchyard

Since 1847 Chorlton has been in the Anglican Diocese of Manchester and Archdeaconry of Manchester; and since 1850, in the Roman Catholic Diocese of Salford. Between 1541 and 1847 it was in the Diocese of Chester and before that the Diocese of Lichfield and Coventry. In medieval times the parish church was the Collegiate Church in Manchester, dependent on which was the chapel of ease at Didsbury.

A timber-framed chapel dedicated to St Clement provided by the Barlow family in 1512 was used until 1779 when it was replaced by a brick chapel, probably on the same site. (Its Grade II listed gatehouse and bell turret remain at Chorlton Green.) Chorlton was designated a parish in 1839 and by 1860 the chapel was deemed inadequate for the expanding population. Lord Egerton provided land for a replacement but not all parishioners supported the proposal and the old chapel remained after the new church was completed in 1866. After the old chapel was demolished in 1949 St Clement's Church became the parish church.

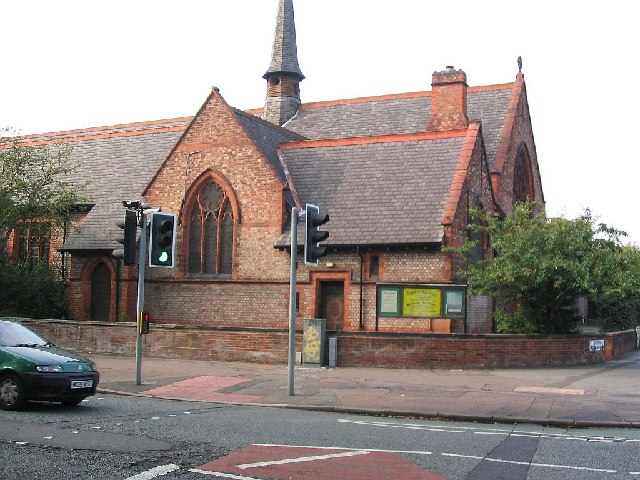
St Werburgh's Church, Wilbraham Road

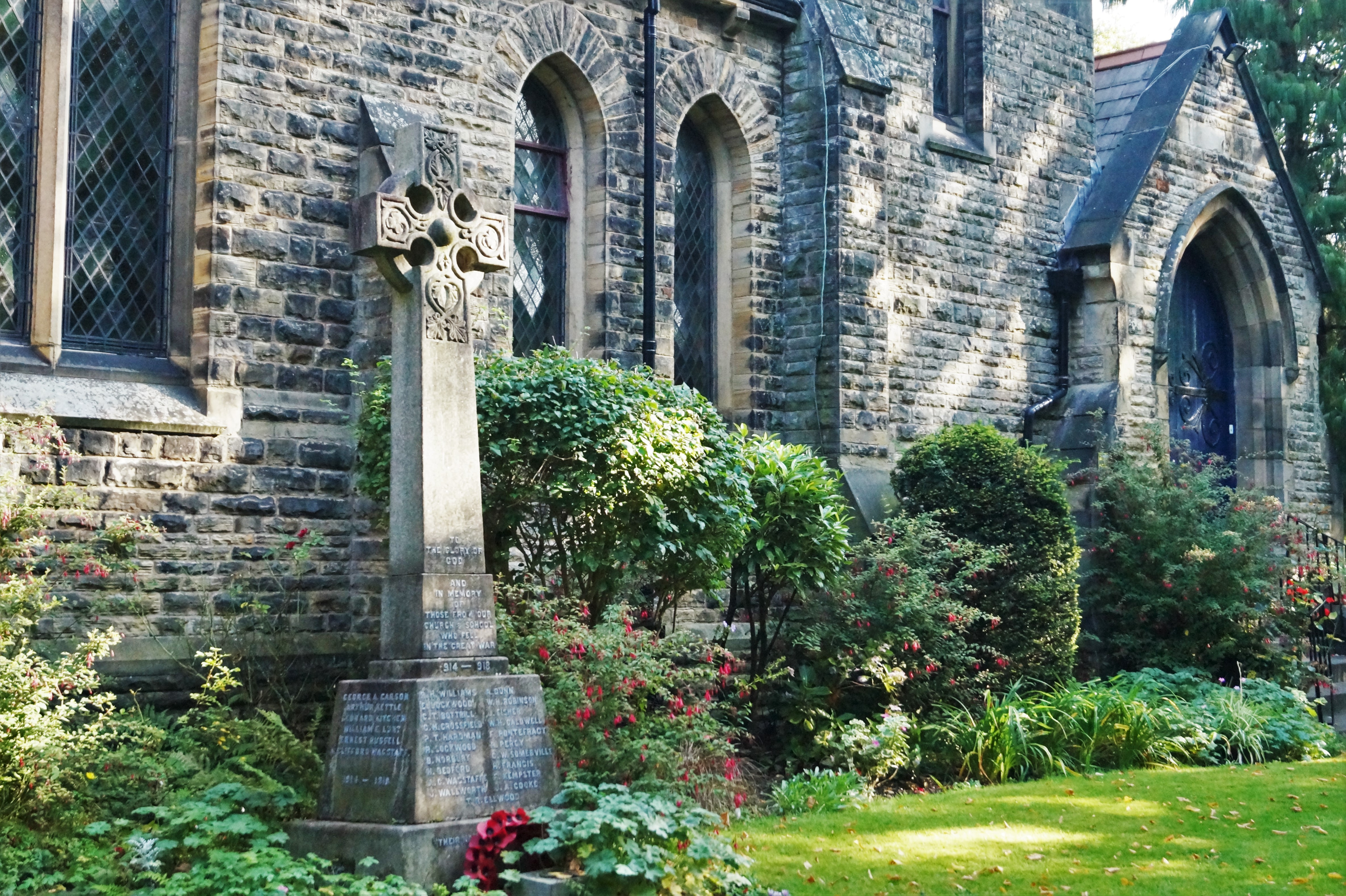
The war memorial at Chorlton Methodist Church

In 1898 a new parish was established consisting of part of St Clement's parish and some others. The foundation stone of St Werburgh's Church was laid on 5 November 1899, its chancel and transepts dedicated in 1900, it was completed and opened on 1 June 1902 and consecrated 15 July 1902. The architect was R. B. Preston and the stained glass is by Humphries, Jackson & Ambler and others.

Methodist chapel was built in about 1805 and replaced by a larger building in 1827. It moved to Manchester Road in 1873 when the neo-Gothic chapel was built. It has a memorial to those who lost their lives in the First World War in the grounds. Manley Park Methodist Church was established in a tin tabernacle in 1905. The present building opened in 1910. A smaller chapel was used by Welsh Methodists. A Congregational Chapel opened in 1883 was replaced in 1894 and became the United Reformed Church, the MacFadyen Memorial Church, but was demolished and its congregation meets in the church hall. Other denominations established churches: the Unitarians in Wilbraham Road in 1901; the Macpherson Memorial Primitive Methodist Church was built in 1896 and enlarged in 1908; (Note: Dates given on the front of the building. After the Second World War the chapel became redundant, and it is now used as a Buddhist meditation centre) the Baptist Maclaren Memorial Church in 1907; (Note: Commemorating Alexander Maclaren, a minister at the Union Chapel, Fallowfield) the Presbyterians in 1908 (St Ninian's Church, also in Wilbraham Road); and the Emmanuel Free Church in 1909. The Unitarian and Baptist Chapels have been demolished, although their congregations are still in existence. The Congregationalists and Baptists have joined the United Reformed Church in the former Congregational church hall. Chorlton Evangelical Church (founded 1930) meets at Ivygreen Road; its present building was opened in 1951.

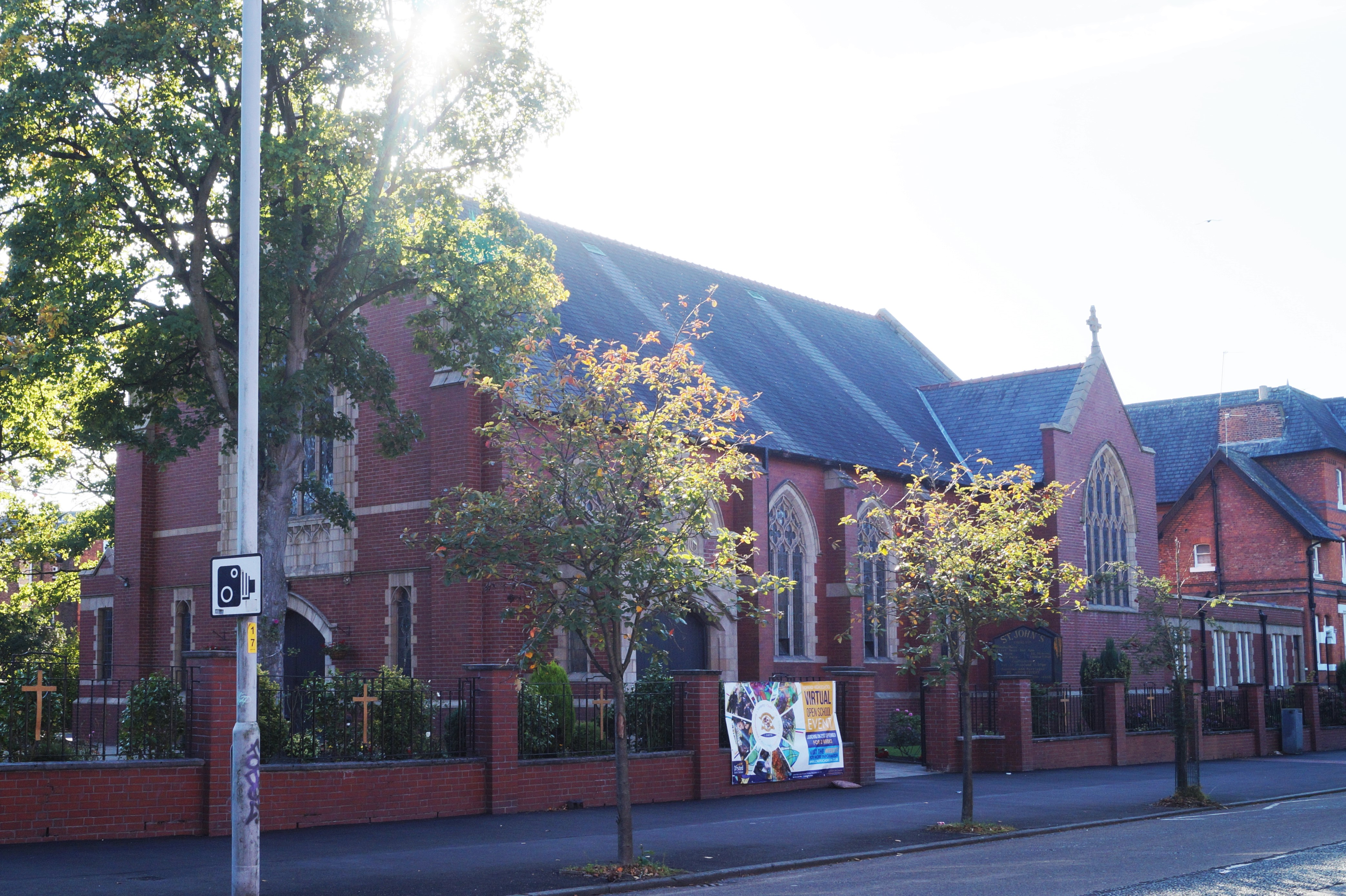
The Church of Our Lady and St John (St. John's Church)

A Roman Catholic mission began in 1892 at St Peter's Chapel in Barlow Moor Road and another was established at St. Augustine's in High Lane. A new church was built in 1927 when the parish became St. John's. St Ambrose of Milan was founded in 1932 at Barlow Moor and a new church opened in 1958. The architects were Reynolds & Stone. Its dedication to St Ambrose of Milan was chosen because St Ambrose Barlow's birthplace was in the parish.

The present-day population includes many Muslims, many of whom are of South Asian origin. Until 2024, the Manchester Islamic High School for Girls was located in Chorlton, before moving to nearby Didsbury. Nearby mosques include Didsbury Mosque, the British Muslim Heritage Centre and Hough End Hall mosque.

There are small numbers of Buddhists: one congregation uses the former Primitive Methodist Chapel and another, the Vairochana Buddhist Centre. The oldest, founded 1975, belongs to the Kagyu Ling school of Tibetan Buddhism. The Manchester Centre for Buddhist Meditation, High Lane, Chorlton, was used by the UK Samatha Trust from the 1980s and established as such after its purchase by the Trust. This centre supports local Buddhist meditation in the Theravada Buddhist tradition.

== Education ==
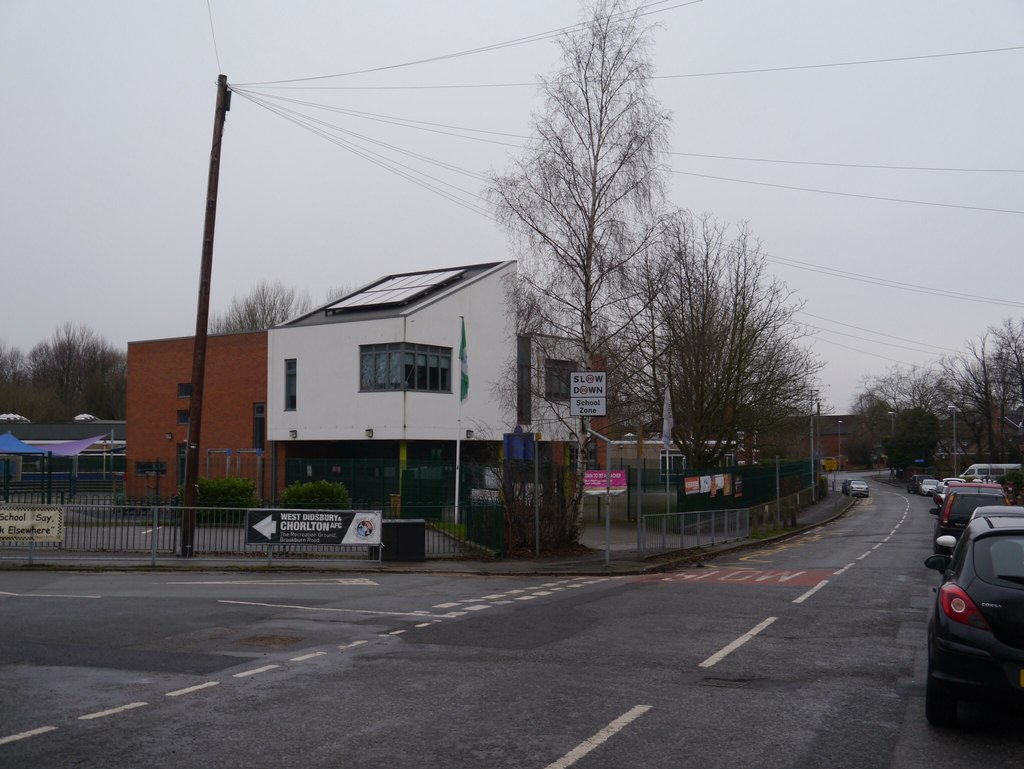
Brookburn Primary School, Brookburn Road

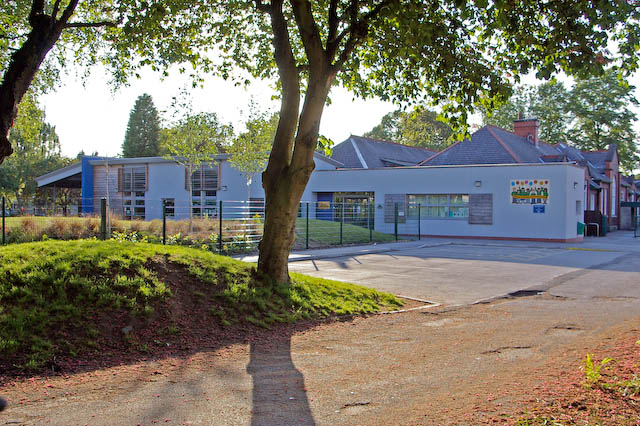
New building at Chorlton Park Primary School

Sir Nicholas Mosley of Hough End Hall who died in 1612, left £100, £5 a year for 20 years, to pay for a schoolmaster at Chorlton Chapel. The Wesleyan Methodists began a Sunday school and day school in about 1810, whereas the Anglican Sunday school did not begin until a later date. In 1845 the Rev. William Birley was responsible for building a Church School at Chorlton Green. When the building was found to be inadequate it was replaced by a new school on the site in 1879. A number of private schools existed in the late 19th century including C. C. Dadley's grammar school and Tom Mostyn's art school. In 1898 a school was under construction for the Roman Catholic parish of St Augustine and in 1901 a new church school was built at St Clement's Road and the old building was used for infants and juniors until this was no longer necessary. In 1904, when Chorlton was incorporated into Manchester, a municipal school was opened and moved to its permanent premises in Oswald Road in 1909.

Secondary schools in Chorlton are Loreto High School, Chorlton High School, Chorlton High School South and until 2024, the Islamic High School for Girls (High Lane), which has since moved to nearby Didsbury.

Chorlton itself has no sixth-forms or colleges. Nearby sixth-forms include Loreto College, Xaverian College, Stretford Grammar School and Didsbury High School's sixth-form.

== Sport and recreation ==
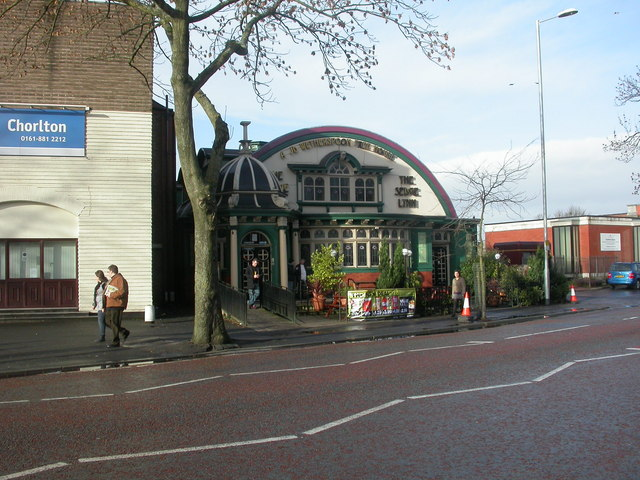
The Sedge Lynn public house, Manchester Road, formerly a Temperance Billiard Hall

In the early 19th century bull-baiting, badger-baiting and cockfighting were popular but were outlawed by an Act of Parliament of 1835 and the last bull-baiting in Chorlton is recorded the same year. Prize-fighting, horse and foot racing, and wrestling took place on the meadows and led to disorder. If the forces of law and order appeared participants and spectators could escape across the Mersey into Cheshire and continue their sport. Horse races are said to have been held on land now part of Chorlton Park in the 16th century.

After the Second World War the Chorltonville owners' committee sold the recreation area and tennis courts which were absorbed into gardens of adjoining houses, and the rest became a football ground, now owned by West Didsbury & Chorlton A.F.C. Broughton Park RUFC which was established in 1882 in Salford, moved to Hough End in 2004.

South West Manchester Cricket Club, founded in 1882, and one of the oldest in the Manchester area, are members of the Greater Manchester Cricket League. The ground is on Ellesmere Road North, the clubhouse is on the site of what was once Hobson's Hall Farm.

An area of what is now Chorlton Park was used many centuries ago for horse racing. As a public park, it dates from 1928: there are gardens, many trees, and recreational facilities. The Recreation Ground, Beech Park, was opened in 1896, donated to the community by Lord Egerton.

Longford Park also is the home of Trafford Athletics Club. There is a synthetic six-lane track that is used heavily in the summer for regional competitions and British Milers' Club meets. Below the main stand is Longfords Gym, run in association with the Athletics Club. There is an 18-hole free to play disc golf course, community football pitches and all-weather tennis courts.

The first part of the Chorlton Cycleway has been delivered with Dutch-style junctions.

== Culture ==
A number of poets and minor publishers of poetry were active in the late 20th century and a poetry group meets at Chorlton Library. There are three amateur dramatic societies that rehearse and perform in Chorlton.

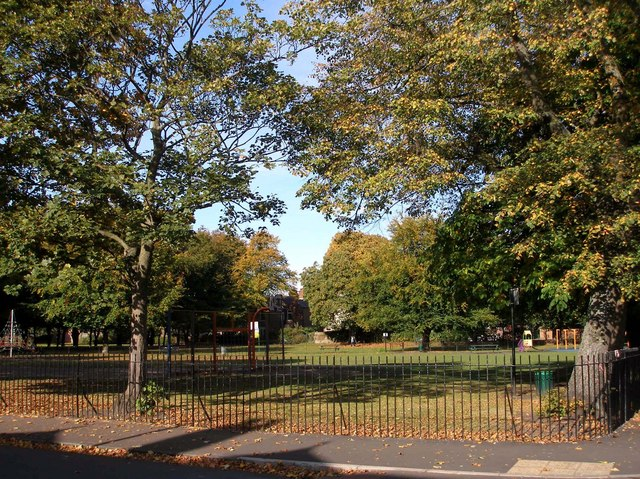
Beech Road Park

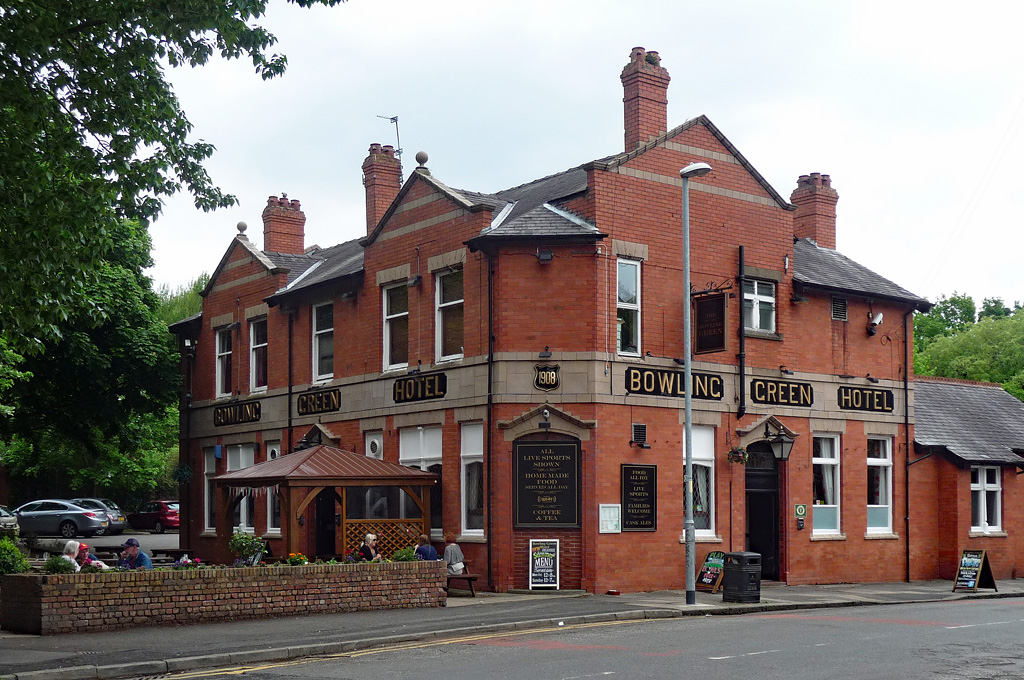
The Bowling Green Hotel

The Beech Road Festival took place on Beech Road, Beech Road Park and Chorlton Green in June or July, with commercial and educational stalls, entertainments and live music and a tug-of-war competition. The festival began in 1991, when two regulars from the Bowling Green Hotel came up with idea of hiring an articulated truck, a sound system and some generators for local acts Rattle 'n' Reel, Hectors House and Toss The Feathers to play on the August bank holiday Sunday on the rec (Beech Road Park): there was a good crowd and the first tug-of-war competition. Unfortunately, it has not taken place since 2011, when a combination of sunny weather and good social media marketing meant the event was attended by an unexpectedly large crowd estimated at 20,000 people, leading to a number of incidents which threatened to overstretch the modest police presence of eight officers at the event. As a result, the Association of Beech Road Traders – the organisation which ran the festival in order to raise money for nearby Beech Road Park – made the unanimous decision to cancel the festival indefinitely.

The Unity Festival takes place in Chorlton Park, encouraging racial and cultural unity and provides a platform for performances by dancers, musicians and singers. Chorlton Big Green Festival takes place in late March/April combining live music, dancing, food, real ale, cider, arts and crafts, workshops, cycling and films. It aims to encourage sustainable living and has a different theme each year.

The Chorlton Arts Festival in May generally features a programme of events over nine days; in 2020, it was shifted to online due to the COVID-19 pandemic. The Chorlton Book Festival takes place over two weeks in the autumn. Chorlton takes part in the Manchester Food & Drink Festival in early October, and in 2013 the inaugural Chorlton Coffee Festival was held in June.

=== Cinemas and dance halls ===
Several cinemas opened in the first half of the 20th century. The first was the Chorlton Pavilion bought by H. D. Moorhouse in 1909 followed by the Palais de Luxe in 1915. It closed in 1958. The Rivoli opened on Barlow Moor Road in 1936 and changed its name several times to the Essoldo, the Classic and the Shalimar before closing in the 1980s. Likewise, the Majestic on Manchester Road had several names, the Savoy, the ABC and the Gaumont. After these closed, there were no remaining cinemas in Chorlton, until 2025, when The Edge Theatre & Arts Centre opened a cinema.

The Chorlton Palais de Danse in Barlow Moor Road became a nightclub before the site was redeveloped.

=== Creative and performing arts ===
Until October 2009 Chorlton was the location for the Cosgrove Hall animation studios where the children's series Chorlton and the Wheelies, Jamie and the Magic Torch, The BFG, The Wind in the Willows, Noddy's Toyland Adventures, Oakie Doke, Cockleshell Bay, Lavender Castle, Danger Mouse and Count Duckula were created. The area is used by film crews for TV locations, such as The Second Coming, as it retains much of its original Victorian architecture. White Van Man used several Chorlton locations and was shown on BBC3 Television in 2010. Chorlton-cum-Hardy was also the home to Bulman a British television crime drama series from 1985 to 1987 created by Murray Smith.

== In popular culture ==
The ITV sitcom The Cuckoo Waltz, starring Diane Keen, David Roper and Lewis Collins was nominally set in Chorlton-cum-Hardy, referenced in certain episodes.

== Notable people ==
- Alcock and Brown, the first men to fly across the Atlantic Ocean, were long-term residents, and a house in Oswald Road is marked by a blue plaque in honour of Brown.
- John Andrews (b. 1936), management consultant and renowned expert on antique furniture, was born and spent his childhood here. He writes mystery novels under the name John Malcolm, and was Chair of the Crime Writers' Association in 1994.
- George Arthurs (1875–1944), librettist and songwriter
- George Best, footballer, spent ten years on and off lodging in the town.
- Sir Matt Busby, (1909–1994) lived in the town for over 30 years. He was the manager of Manchester United F.C.
- Quentin Crisp, author, raconteur and notable gay icon died in Chorlton in 1999, while visiting the UK on the eve of performing his one-man show, and was cremated at Southern Cemetery.
- Dr Aneez Esmail, Associate Vice President, University of Manchester; first British Pakistani to hold an executive position at a Russell Group university.
- The Bee Gees spent nearly eight years of their childhood living in the town Chorlton. In 1958, shortly after the birth of their brother Andy Gibb, who also became a major musical act, they moved to Australia.
- Damon Gough, professionally known as Badly Drawn Boy, indie songwriter and multi-instrumentalist
- Margaret Irvine, crossword compiler
- Michael Kennedy (1926–2014), the music critic, author and journalist, was born in Chorlton.
- Margaret Lacey (1911–1988), actress, born in Chorlton-cum-Hardy
- Sir Robert Mark, Commissioner of the Metropolitan Police, began his career with the Manchester City Police. He was born in Chorlton and was resident there until his move to Leicester in 1957.
- Wunmi Mosaku, BAFTA winning actress, grew up in Chorlton.
- Paul Rawlinson (1963-2019), international lawyer, lived in the town until the age of 18. He was the first British global chair of the global law firm Baker McKenzie.
- Charlotte Worthington, Olympic gold medallist, grew up in Chorlton and attended Chorlton High School.

Other residents have included locally-born actor Warren Clarke and Freddie Garrity (of Freddie and the Dreamers). The actress Doris Speed lived in the town for over twenty years, she played Annie Walker, landlady of the Rovers Return in the ITV soap opera Coronation Street. Harry H. Corbett, of Steptoe and Son fame, started out in the Conservative Club's Dramatic Society. Harry Goodwin, known for his photographs of pop musicians and sports personalities, was the resident photographer of the BBC Television programme Top of the Pops from its inception in 1964 until 1973. In 2007, Yoko Ono opened a permanent exhibit of Goodwin's photographs at Liverpool John Lennon Airport. That happened because Neil Pakey found some of Goodwin's photographs on display in a local barber's. Brian Cosgrove and his business partner, Mark Hall, founded the animation studio Cosgrove Hall Films for Thames Television of the ITV network, in Albany Road, Chorlton.

== See also ==
- Listed buildings in Manchester-M21
- Lloyd and Platt's Hotel, Wilbraham Road, a listed building
- Merseybank
- Parks and open spaces in Chorlton-cum-Hardy
