= Southern Cemetery, Manchester =

Large cemetery in Manchester, England

Coordinates: 53.4286°N 2.2582°W

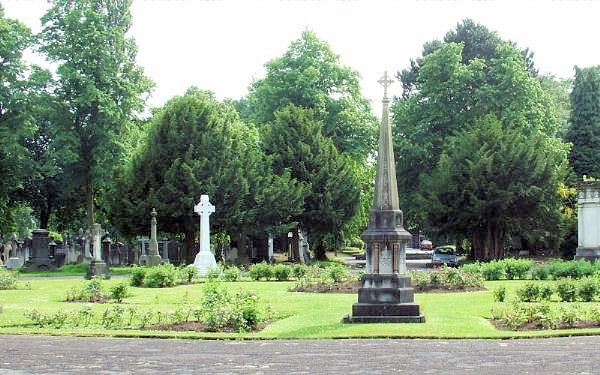
Gravestones and memorials in Southern Cemetery

Southern Cemetery is a large municipal cemetery in Chorlton-cum-Hardy, Manchester, England, 3 miles (4.8 km) south of the city centre. It opened in 1879 and is owned and administered by Manchester City Council. It is the largest municipal cemetery in the United Kingdom and the second largest in Europe.

== History ==
Manchester Southern Cemetery was originally laid out on a 100-acre (40 ha) plot of land, that cost Manchester Corporation £38,340 in 1872. Its cemetery buildings were designed by architect H. J. Paull and its layout attributed to the city surveyor, James Gascoigne Lynde. The cemetery was consecrated by the Bishop of Manchester, Bishop James Fraser on 26 September 1879, and formally opened on 9 October 1879 by the Mayor of Manchester, Charles Grundy.

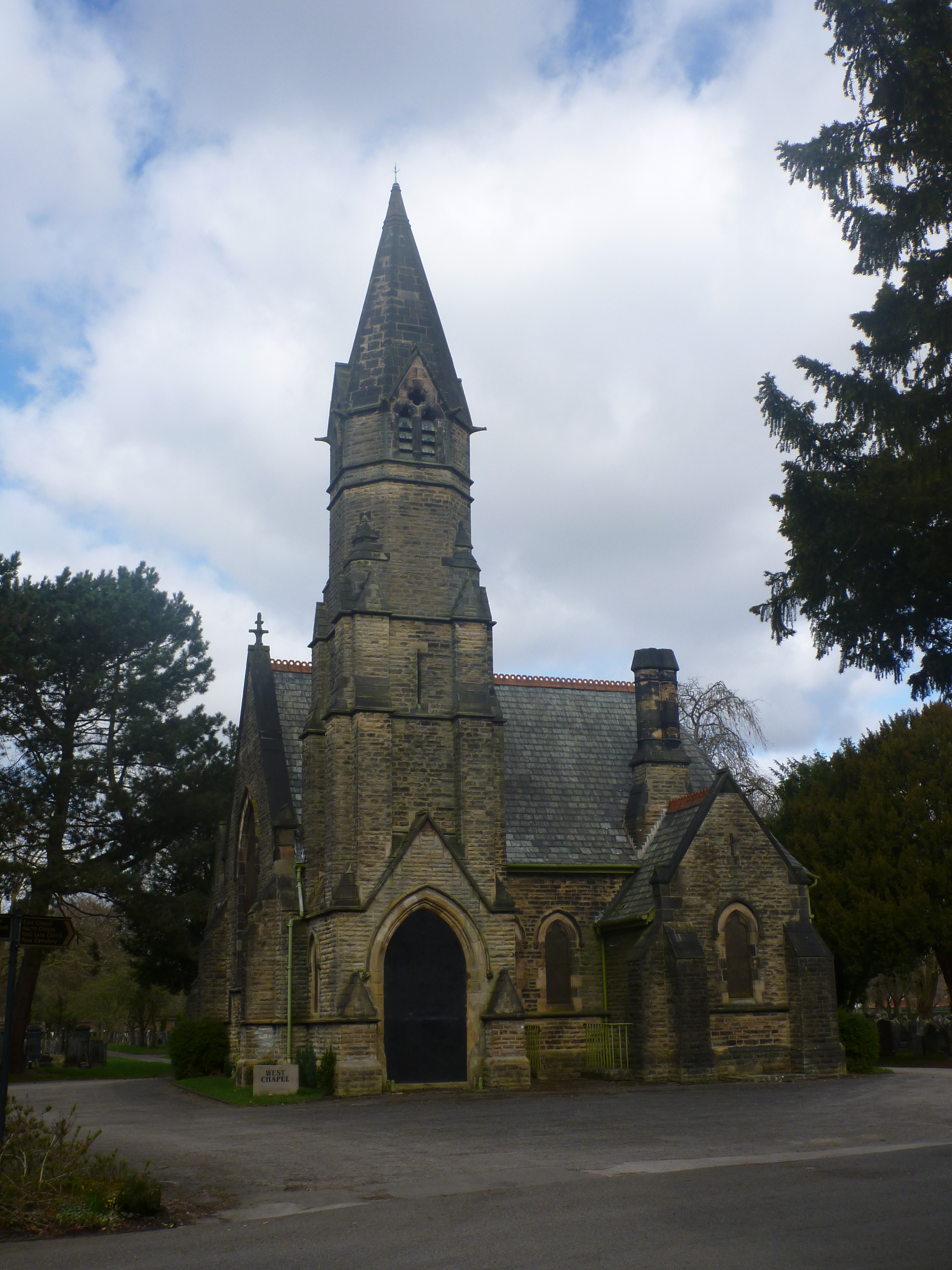
West Chapel

Within the cemetery mortuary chapels were erected for Anglicans, Nonconformists, and Roman Catholics, linked by an elliptical drive, and a Jewish chapel at the west corner of the site. The original cemetery is registered by English Heritage in the Register of Historic Parks and Gardens for its historic interest and the mortuary chapels and other structures are listed buildings. The site was expanded by the purchase of 90 acres (36 ha) on the opposite side of Nell Lane in 1926, the first section of which opened in 1943. Some of the 1926 purchase has been developed for housing and some is occupied by allotments.

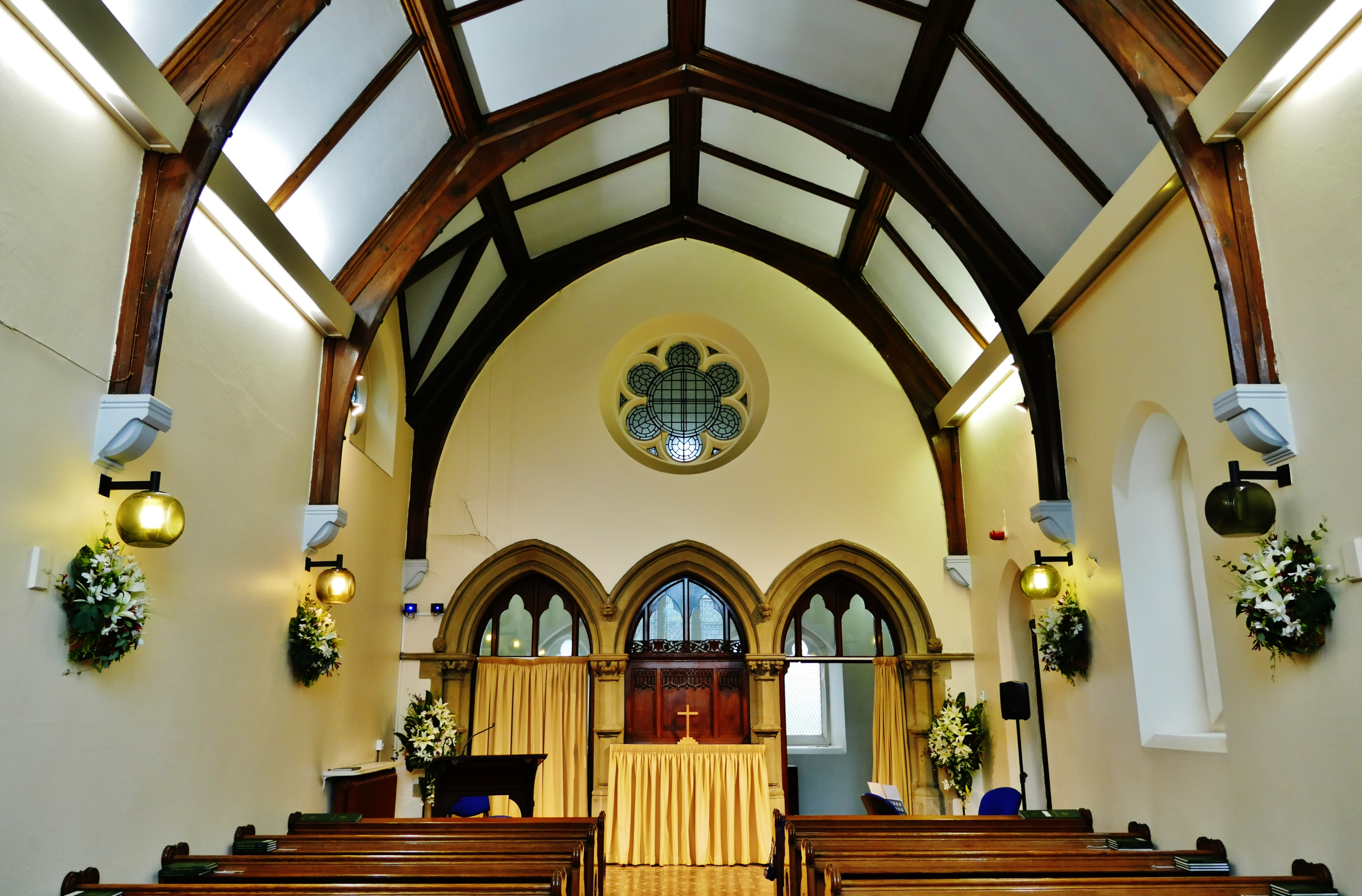
North Chapel Interior

The main area of the cemetery is located to the north of Barlow Moor Road and to the west of the A5103 Princess Road; its northwards extension is on Nell Lane bought by the council in 1926. Its layout complements the original cemetery. A war memorial commemorates Allied servicemen who died in the two world wars.

In 2009, in what was described as a racially motivated attack, up to 20 Muslim graves were vandalised.

== Structures ==
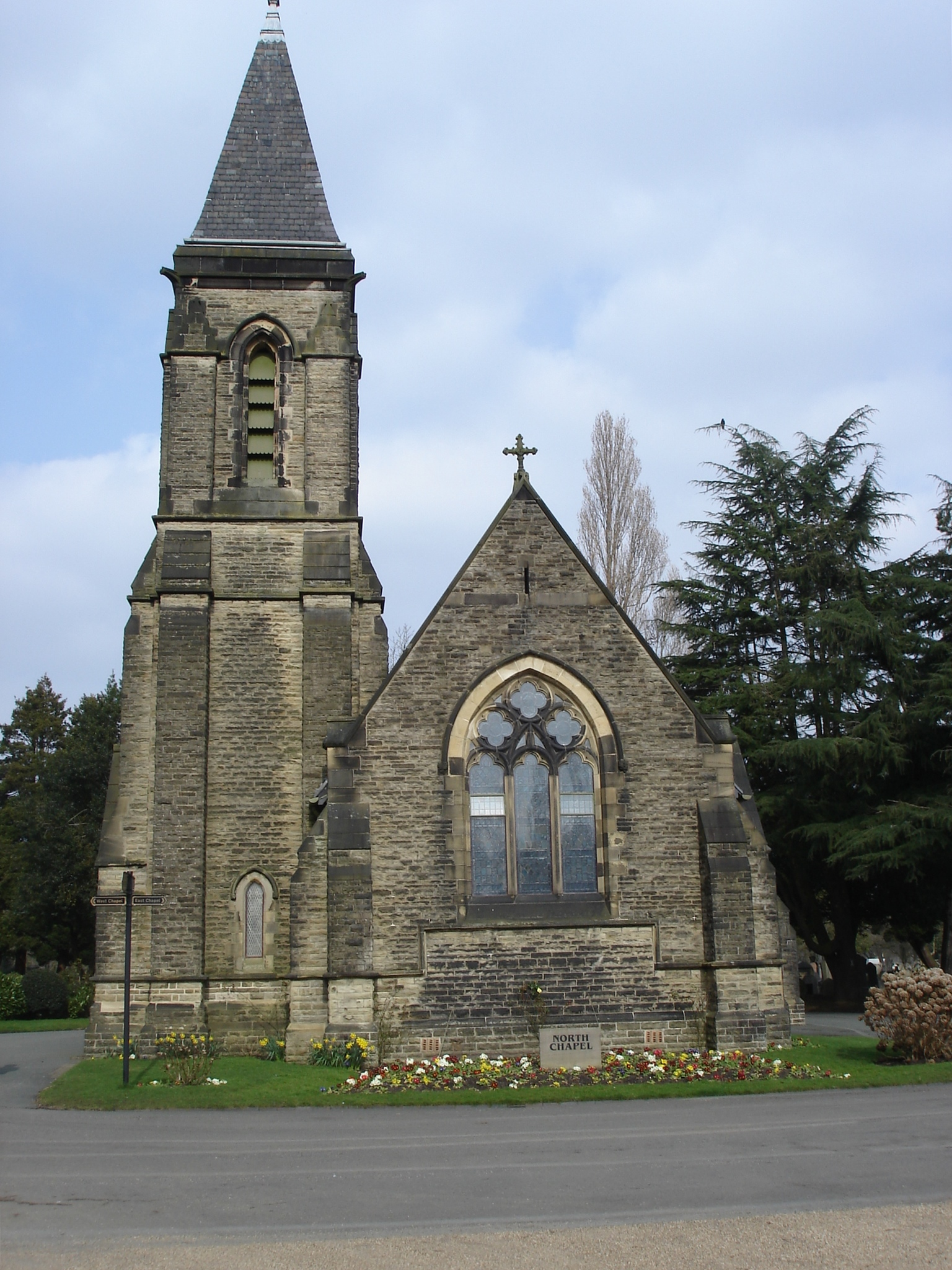
North Chapel

The grade II listed registrar's office near the entrance gateway was built in 1879 in the neo-Gothic style in sandstone with slate roofs. Three service chapels are located in Southern Cemetery, only one of which is currently used for funeral services. The remaining two chapels are semi-derelict.

A remembrance lodge was created in the cemetery, opened on 1 October 2008. It is situated at the main entrance on Barlow Moor Road and is for the use of families and friends wishing to pay their respects and remember loved ones.

Immediately adjacent to the northwest corner of the cemetery on Barlow Moor Road is Manchester Crematorium. It was formally opened on 22 August 1892 by Hugh Grosvenor, 1st Duke of Westminster, and it was the second Crematorium to be established in the United Kingdom (the first was Woking Crematorium).

== Notable burials and monuments ==
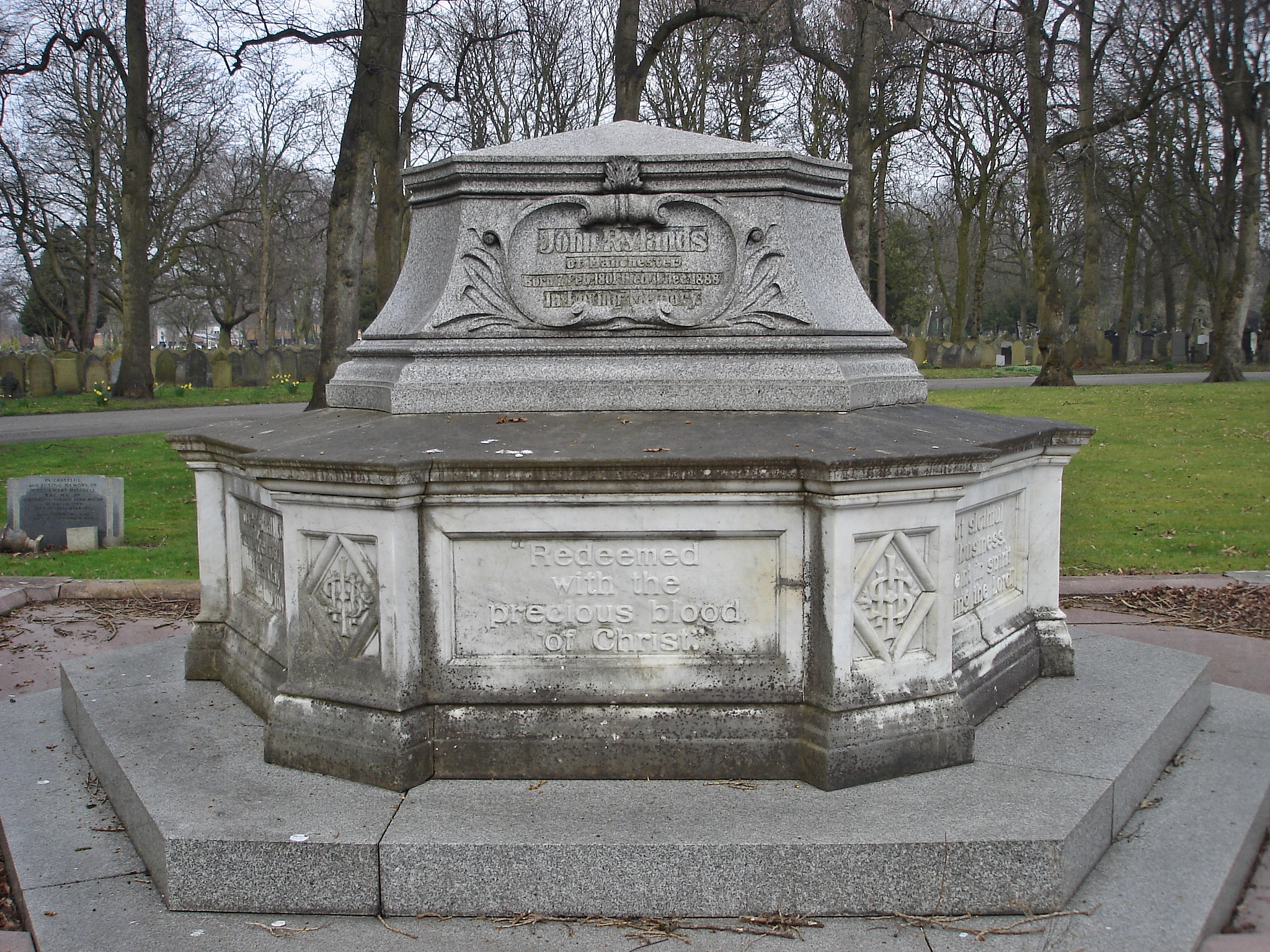
Tomb of John Rylands

Manchester's first multi-millionaire, industrialist and philanthropist John Rylands, is buried in the cemetery. The Rylands memorial is the grandest in the cemetery, although part of the original structure was removed circa 1927 and the bronze railings were stolen circa 1967: his widow Enriqueta's ashes lie in the vault below. The graves of some of those associated with the firm of Rylands are nearby, including those of Reuben Spencer and William Carnelley.

Manchester's "Sherlock Holmes" Jerome Caminada (1844–1914) is buried there.

A Grade II listed monument in the form of a white marble Celtic cross commemorates Sir John Alcock who piloted the first non-stop trans-Atlantic aircraft flight from Newfoundland to Clifden Ireland in June 1919.

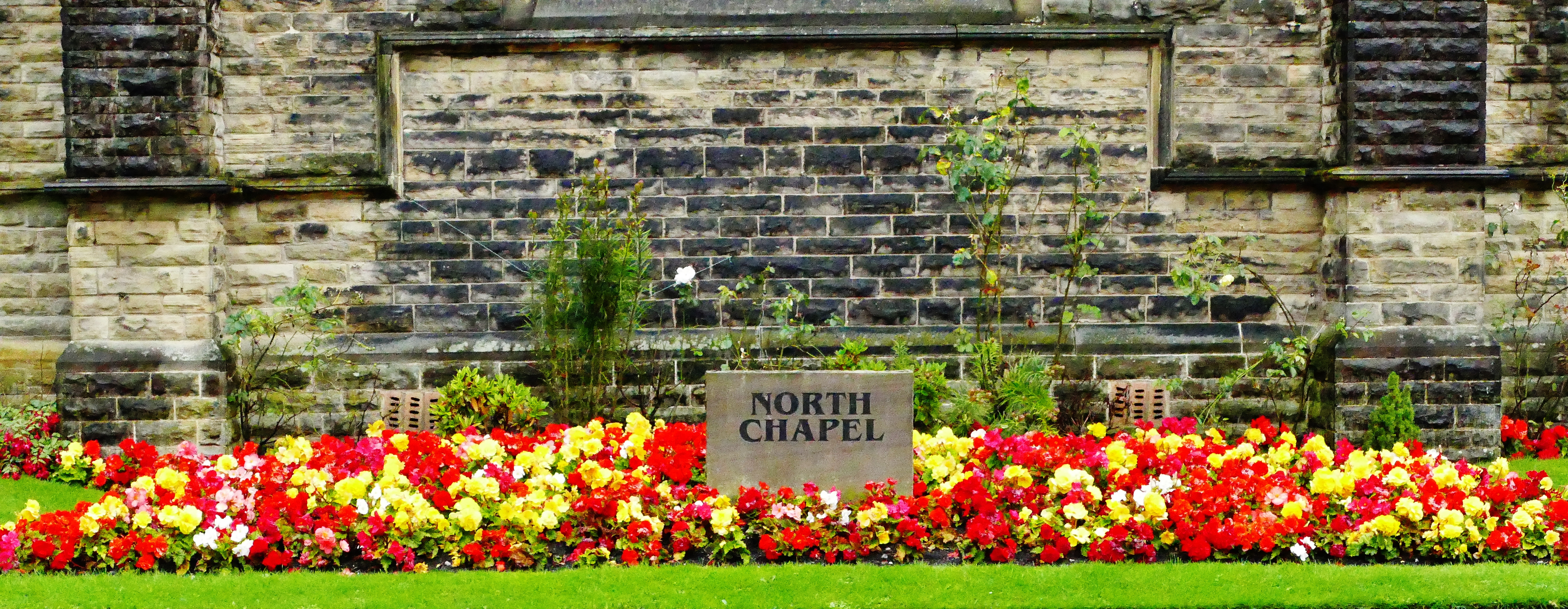
North Chapel flower beds

Sir Matt Busby, manager of Manchester United F.C. is buried in the cemetery, alongside his wife Lady Jean Busby who died in December 1988. Billy Meredith (1874–1958), who played for Manchester City F.C. and Manchester United, is buried here, as is Willie Satinoff, a racecourse owner who died in the Munich air disaster.

Ernest Marples, credited with overseeing the introduction of automatic dialling and motorways, is buried under a modest memorial.

Stretford-born artist L. S. Lowry was buried next to his parents in 1976. Also from the arts world are the graves of John Cassidy, the Irish sculptor and Maria Pawlikowska-Jasnorzewska, the Polish poet. Wilfred Pickles, the Yorkshire-born radio presenter, and his wife Mabel are buried together. Also buried here is the singer and actress Maud Boyd.

Factory Records founder Tony Wilson is buried in the cemetery, a headstone designed by Peter Saville and Ben Kelly was installed in October 2010. Rob Gretton (manager of Joy Division and New Order) and record producer Martin Hannett are also buried here.

Lesley Ann Downey and Edward Evans, two victims of the Moors murderers were buried here in the 1960s but Downey's grave was moved after vandals daubed its headstone with graffiti.

=== Monuments ===
Katyn memorial

A memorial to the victims of the Katyn massacre (the killing of 22,000 Polish nationals by the Soviet NKVD in 1940) is located next to Princess Road, in an area in which there are many Polish graves. It was unveiled in 1990.

A memorial commemorating the 1980 Tenerife Air Disaster, when Dan-Air charter flight 1008 flew into a hillside in Tenerife, killing all 146 on board, contains the names of the victims inscribed on slate tablets within a small grassed enclosure.

=== War memorials ===
Polish Armed Forces memorial

Southern Cemetery contains two separate memorials commemorating the fallen in two world wars. The World War I Memorial is located on a triangular plot on the south side of the cemetery, near the main entrance on Barlow Moor Road, and features a stone Cross of Sacrifice and a screen wall bearing the names of the fallen and the inscription "Their name liveth for evermore". On the western side of the cemetery lies the World War II Memorial, which also contains a large stone Cross of Sacrifice and names inscribed on stone walls. This memorial also incorporates a Polish War Memorial to 17 Polish servicemen interred here, along with inscriptions of the names of casualties of both wars whose burials in other Manchester cemeteries and churchyards have been lost, and those whose remains were cremated.

=== War graves ===
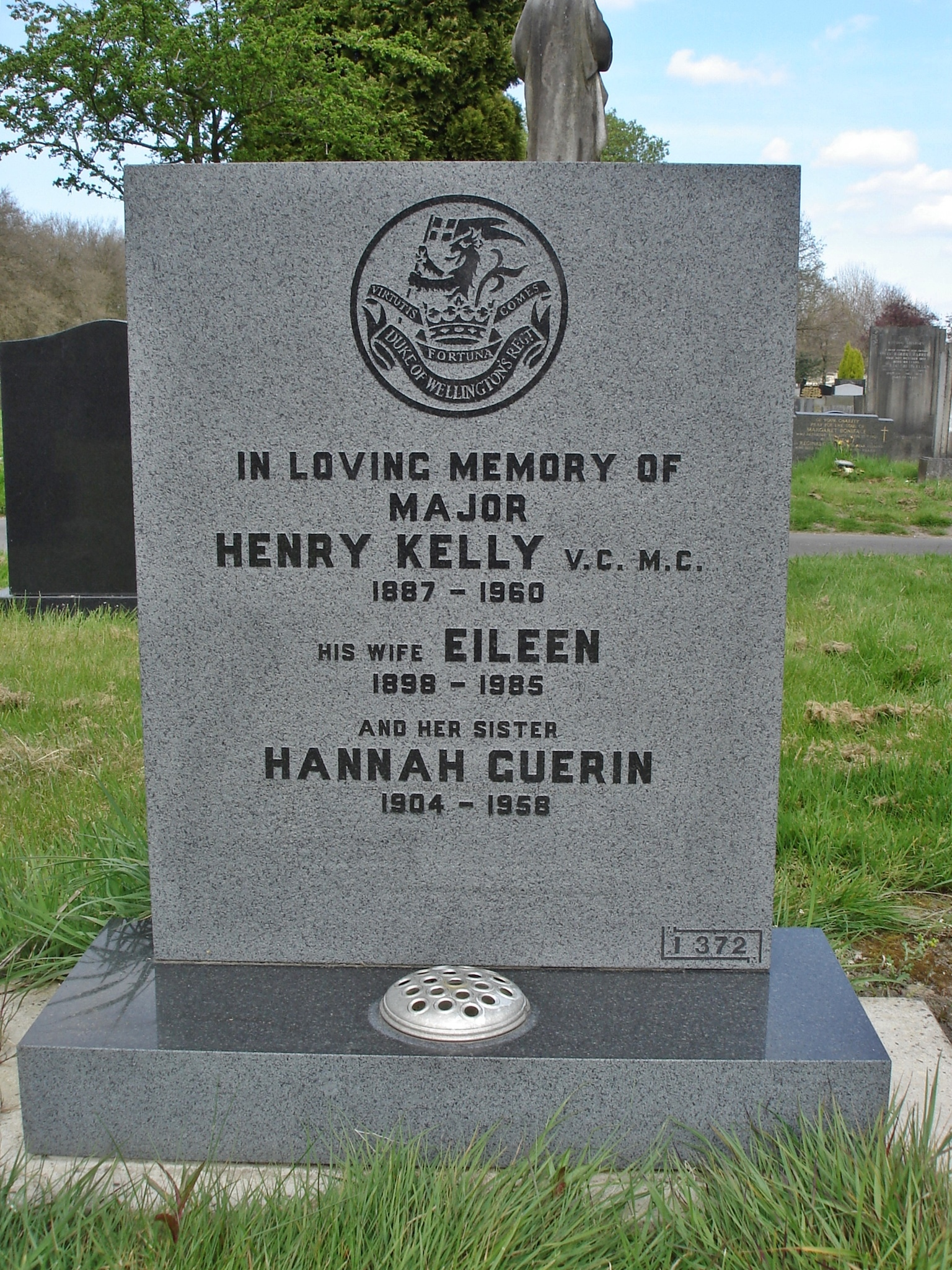
Grave of Henry Kelly, VC

The Commonwealth War Graves Commission (CWGC) register and maintain the war graves of 775 Commonwealth service personnel (including one unidentified) of the First World War and 475 (including 3 unidentified) of the Second. Many graves are scattered around the cemetery but some are clustered around each of the two war memorials, one for each war.

Two holders of the Victoria Cross – Major Henry Kelly (First World War recipient award, died 1960) and Colour Sergeant John Prettyjohns (Crimean War award and the first to a Royal Marine, died 1887) – are buried in the cemetery.

Manchester-born Philip Baybutt, who received the Medal of Honor during the American Civil War, is buried there.

== Notable cremations ==
- Elizabeth Wolstenholme Elmy (1833–1918), suffragist
- Quentin Crisp (1908–1999), writer

== In music ==
In 1986, the Manchester Indie rock band The Smiths released a song entitled "Cemetry Gates" on their album The Queen Is Dead (later released as B-side of the single "Ask"), loosely written about Southern Cemetery. The band's lead singer Morrissey, would often walk through Southern Cemetery in his youth. While the song's lyrics make reference to noted literary figures John Keats, W. B. Yeats and Oscar Wilde, none of these men is actually buried in Southern Cemetery.

== See also ==
- Listed buildings in Manchester-M21
