= International River Foundation =

Australian environmental organization

- Formation: 2003
- Founder: Brisbane City Council; Government of Queensland; Thiess; BHP Mitsubishi Alliance
- Location: Brisbane, Australia
- Website: www.riverfoundation.org.au

The International River Foundation, sometimes stylised as the International RiverFoundation, is an Australian environmental organisation focused on global river restoration and protection. It was co-founded in 2003 by Brisbane City Council, the Queensland Government, and the mining companies Thiess and BHP Mitsubishi Alliance.

== Activities ==
=== International River Symposium ===
The International River Foundation hosts the International River Symposium conference (sometimes stylised as the "International Riversymposium") annually in Brisbane, Australia. The event is intended to promote knowledge exchange among global river practitioners. The first International River Symposium was held in 1998 as part of the Brisbane Festival, prefiguring the founding of the International River Foundation.

==== Brisbane Declaration ====
The 10th International Riversymposium and International Environmental Flows Conference was held in September 2007 and attended by over 750 delegates from more than 50 countries. The event resulted in a consensus document known as the Brisbane Declaration and Global Action Agenda, which is considered a significant landmark in setting international goals for environmental flows in freshwater-dependent ecosystems among scientists and water management practitioners.

=== Thiess International River Prize ===
The International River Foundation awards the Thiess International River Prize (sometimes spelled "Riverprize") for excellence in river restoration and management. The prize is presented from a slate of finalists during the annual International River Symposium. First presented in 1999 prior to the founding of the International River Foundation, the award is considered by some to be the most prestigious honor in the field of river restoration. The award comes with a cash prize of US$100,000 as of 2025.

Year	Recipient	Principle waterway	Locale
2025	Friends of the Chicago River	Chicago River	Illinois, United States
2021	Africa Sand Dam Foundation	Thwake River	Kenya
2019	James River Association	James River	Virginia, United States
2017	San Antonio River Authority	San Antonio River	Texas, United States
2016	Buffalo Niagara Riverkeeper	Niagara River	New York, United States
2015	Lake Eyre Basin Partnership	Lake Eyre Basin	Australia
2014	International Commission for the Protection of the Rhine	River Rhine	Europe
2012	Willamette River Initiative	Willamette River	Oregon, United States
2011	Charles River Watershed Association	Charles River	Massachusetts, United States
2010	Environment Agency and Thames River Restoration Trust	River Thames	United Kingdom
2009	Lake Simcoe Region Conservation Authority	Lake Simcoe	Ontario, Canada
2008	St. Johns River Water Management District	St. Johns River	Florida, United States
2007	International Commission for the Protection of the Danube River	Danube River	Europe
2006	Foreign Affairs Office of Chengdu Municipal Government	Sha River	China
2005	Communaite de Communes du Val de Drome	Drome River	France
2004	Siuslaw Institute	Siuslaw River Basin	Oregon, United States
2003	Alexander River Restoration Administration	Nahal Alexander	Israel
2002	Mekong River Commission	Mekong River	Southeast Asia
2001	Blackwood Basin Group	Blackwood River	Australia
2000	Grand River Conservation Authority	Grand River	Ontario, Canada
1999	Mersey Basin Campaign	Mersey Basin	United Kingdom

==== Asia River Prize ====
Year	Recipient	Principle waterway	Locale
2018	Pasig River Rehabilitation Commission	Pasig River	Philippines

==== Australasian River Prize ====
Year	Recipient	Principle waterway	Locale
2018	Whangawehi Catchment Management Group	Whangawehi Stream	New Zealand

==== Australian River Prize ====
Year	Recipient	Principle waterway
2015	Ngarrindjeri Regional Authority	Murray River
2013	Glenelg Hopkins Catchment Management Authority	Glenelg River
2012	Condamine Alliance	Condamine River
2011	Sunshine Coast District Council	Rivers of the Sunshine Coast
2010	Derwent Estuary Program	Derwent Estuary
2009	Oxley Creek Catchment Association	Oxley Creek
2006	Torbay Catchments Group	Torbay Catchment
2005	Murray Wetlands Working Group	Murray Wetlands
2005	Bulimba Creek Catchment Coordinating Committee	Bulimba Creek
2004	Great Lakes Council	Wallis Lake
2003	Hunter Catchment Management Trust	Hunter River
2002	Merri Creek Management Committee	Merri Creek
2001	Goulburn Broken Catchment Management Authority	Goulburn Broken Catchment

==== European River Prize ====
Year	Recipient	Principle waterway	Locale
2022	Cumbria River Restoration Partnerships Programme	Rivers of the Lake District National Park	United Kingdom
2016	Segura River Project	Segura River	Spain
2014	Freiland Environmental Consulting Civil Engineers and Government of Styria	River Mur	Austria
2013	International Commission for the Protection of the Rhine	River Rhine	Europe

==== New Zealand River Prize ====
Year	Recipient	Principle waterway
2015	Aorere River Initiative	Aorere River

==== North American River Prize ====
Year	Recipient	Principle waterway	Locale
2015	Buffalo Niagara Riverkeeper	Buffalo River	New York, United States

=== Twinning ===
The International River Foundation's Twinning programme encourages peer-to-peer learning by creating partnerships between river advocacy organisations in different countries. For example, the River Thames was twinned with the Ganges River in 2013.
