= ICPR =

ICPR could refer to:

- International Committee for Prostitutes' Rights, now known as the European Sex Workers' Rights Alliance
- Inter-university Consortium for Political Research, now known as the Inter-university Consortium for Political and Social Research
- Indian Council of Philosophical Research
- International Conference on Pattern Recognition, a conference hosted by the International Association for Pattern Recognition
- International Commission for the Protection of the Rhine, a commission which is part of the management of the Rhine Basin
- Interdisciplinary Conference on Psychedelic Research, an international conference, hosted by the OPEN Foundation
