= Hügelsheim =

- Municipality
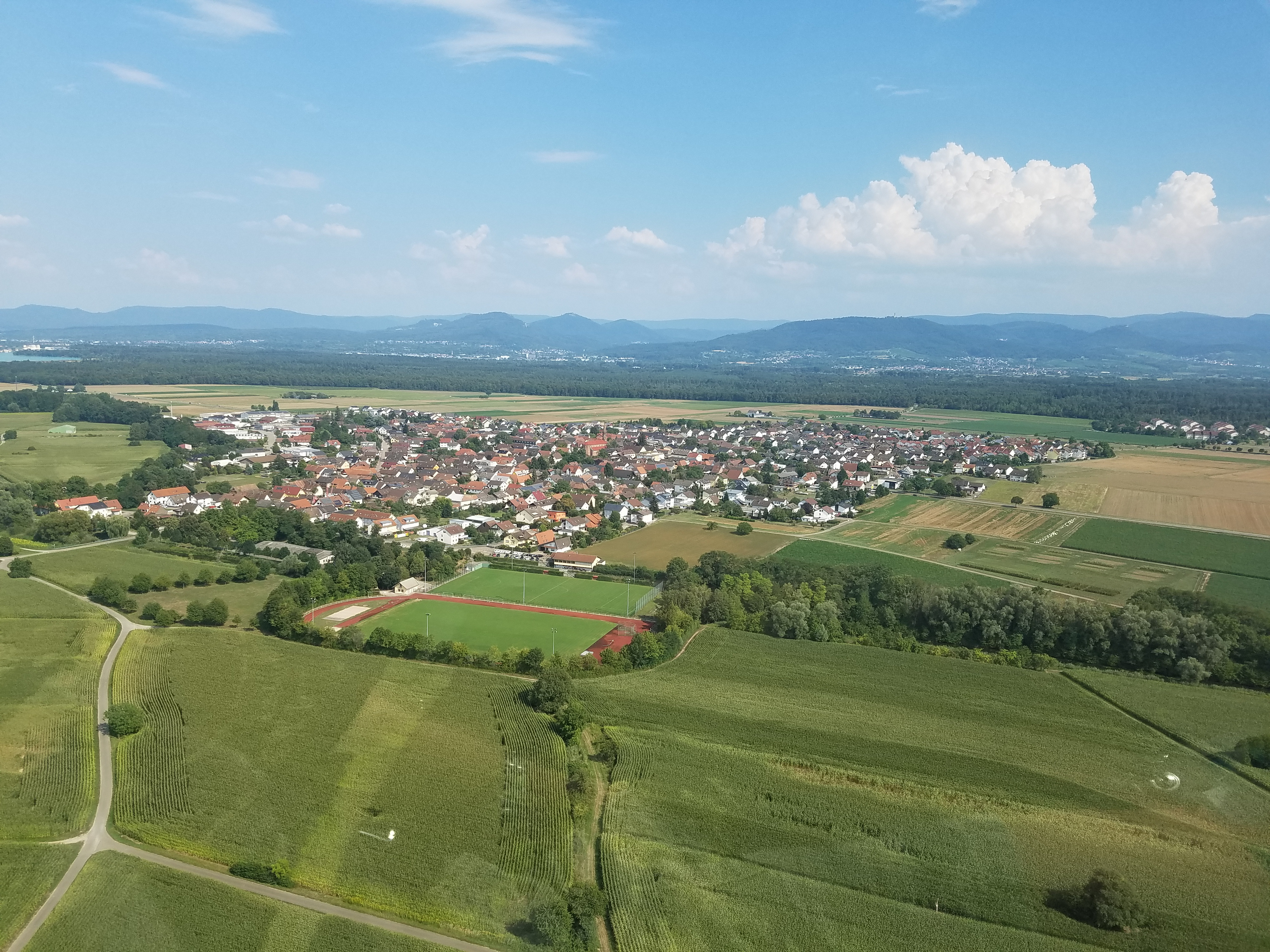

- Coat of arms

- Location of Hügelsheim within Rastatt district
- Interactive map of Hügelsheim
- Location within Germany Location within Baden-Württemberg
- Coordinates: 48°48′N 8°7′E
- Country: Germany
- State: Baden-Württemberg
- Admin. region: Karlsruhe
- District: Rastatt

Government
  - Mayor (2021–29): Kerstin Cee

Area
  - Total: 14.97 km^{2} (5.78 sq mi)
- Elevation: 122 m (400 ft)

Population (2025-12-31)
  - Total: 4,950
  - Density: 331/km^{2} (856/sq mi)
- Time zone: UTC+01:00 (CET)
  - Summer (DST): UTC+02:00 (CEST)
- Postal codes: 76549
- Dialling codes: 07229
- Vehicle registration: RA
- Website: www.huegelsheim.de

Hügelsheim (Low Alemannic: Heilze or Helse) is a western German town across the Rhine river border with French Alsace.

Two burial places suggest possible settlements dating back as far as the Bronze Age. The "Heilingenbuck" (Holy Hill), a princely tomb, dates back to the Hallstattian period, probably the 3rd or 4th century BC. The Romans who occupied the area from 69 to 79 AD built a road leading from Strasburg via Kehl, Hügelsheim, Rastatt, Gruenwinkel and Graben to Neuenheim which gave the village its ribbon-built character. In the 3rd century AD the Romans were driven out by the Alemanni tribes. In a document from 788 intended for the Bonifatius convent in Fulda, Hügelsheim is mentioned for the first time as "Hughilaheim".

The population of Hügelsheim earned their livelihood as farmers, fishermen and barge men, and for centuries there was a weekly market ship traveling to Strasbourg. In 1834 the first steamship on the Rhine rang in the end of the Hügelsheim barge men's guild.

The Rhine River has always brought not only benefits but also harm to the village, reaching into the most recent history. The construction of the Iffezheim Lock has caused irreparable damage to pastures and in its wake brought considerable financial disadvantages to the community. A lawsuit against the Federal Government in this matter lasted for nearly a decade. Finally Hügelsheim was granted a 1 million Deutsch Mark compensation for the loss in its industrial gravel pits.

Hügelsheim has its own water supply and purification plant, and natural gas is supplied by the public utility works of the city of Baden-Baden.
