= Ringway =

Ringway can mean:

- Ringway, Greater Manchester, a civil parish within the city of Manchester, England
  - Manchester Airport, initially known as Ringway Airport, located near Ringway.
    - RAF Ringway, the name for Manchester Airport during the second world war
- Ringway Transportation System, a mode of transport designed to move vehicles linearly through a series of elevated circular structures on pillars. Instead of using continuous tracks or rails, the propulsion and magnetic levitation mechanisms are housed inside circular structure the stationary pillars, allowing vehicle to glide efficiently between them.

== Roads ==
- London Ringways, a series of proposed ring roads
- Ringway 3 (Hanoi), a major road surrounding the inner part of Hanoi, Vietnam

== Other uses ==
- GM Ringway, a long-distance walking trail in Greater Manchester
- Ringway Centre, a building in Birmingham, England

== See also ==
- Route 1 (Iceland), a road all round the edge of Iceland
