= Gambsheim =

Gambsheim Gàmbse
- Commune
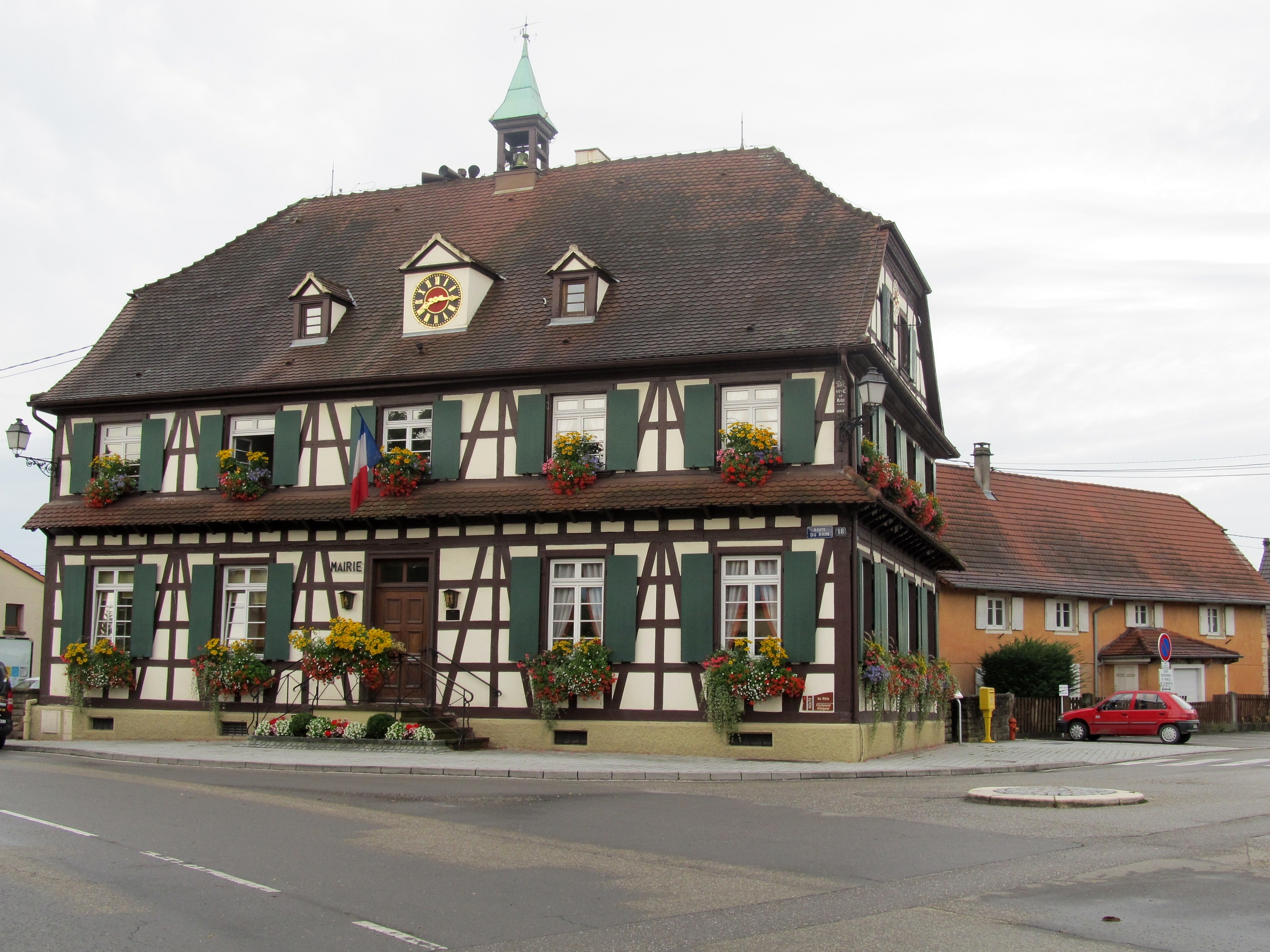
- Gambsheim town hall

- Coat of arms
- Location of Gambsheim
- Location within France Location within Grand Est
- Coordinates: 48°41′35″N 7°53′03″E
- Country: France
- Region: Grand Est
- Department: Bas-Rhin
- Arrondissement: Haguenau-Wissembourg
- Canton: Brumath
- Intercommunality: Pays Rhénan

Government
  - Mayor (2020–2026): Hubert Hoffmann
- Area^{1}: 17.38 km^{2} (6.71 sq mi)
- Highest elevation: 131 m (430 ft)
- Lowest elevation: 126 m (413 ft)
- Population (2023): 5,312
  - Density: 305.6/km^{2} (791.6/sq mi)
- Time zone: UTC+01:00 (CET)
  - Summer (DST): UTC+02:00 (CEST)
- INSEE/Postal code: 67151 /67760
- ^{1} French Land Register data, which excludes lakes, ponds, glaciers > 1 km^{2} (0.386 sq mi or 247 acres) and river estuaries.

Gambsheim is a commune in the Bas-Rhin department and Grand Est region of north-eastern France, in the historical region of Alsace.

== Geography ==
Gambsheim lies adjacent to a river-crossing into Germany that is favoured by southbound traffic on the A35 autoroute wishing to avoid traffic delays around Strasbourg. The crossing coincides with the location of a large river lock which, like the similar French-German cooperation project at Iffezheim Lock, is also the site of a power station and one of the Rhine's first fish ladders. The latter was installed to support migratory fish in general and, more specifically, in an attempt to restore the abundant salmon population for which the upper Rhine was famous before the early 20th century, when the installation of a series of locks rendered the river navigable beyond Basel for boats, but blocked it for migrating fish.

== Population ==
Historical population
Year	Pop.	±% p.a.
1968	3,142	—
1975	3,813	+2.80%
1982	3,948	+0.50%
1990	3,707	−0.78%
1999	3,858	+0.44%
2007	4,377	+1.59%
2012	4,572	+0.88%
2017	4,883	+1.32%
2023	5,312	+1.41%
Source: INSEE

== Landmarks ==
- The church of St Nazaire.
- Gambsheim lock gates (Upper Rhine).
- Town hall, built in 1823 to replace an 18th-century building.
- Gambsheim hydroelectrical power plant; established in 1967, it produces 141 MW.

== See also ==
- Communes of the Bas-Rhin department
