= Iffezheim Lock =

Coordinates: 48.832125°N 8.11306°E

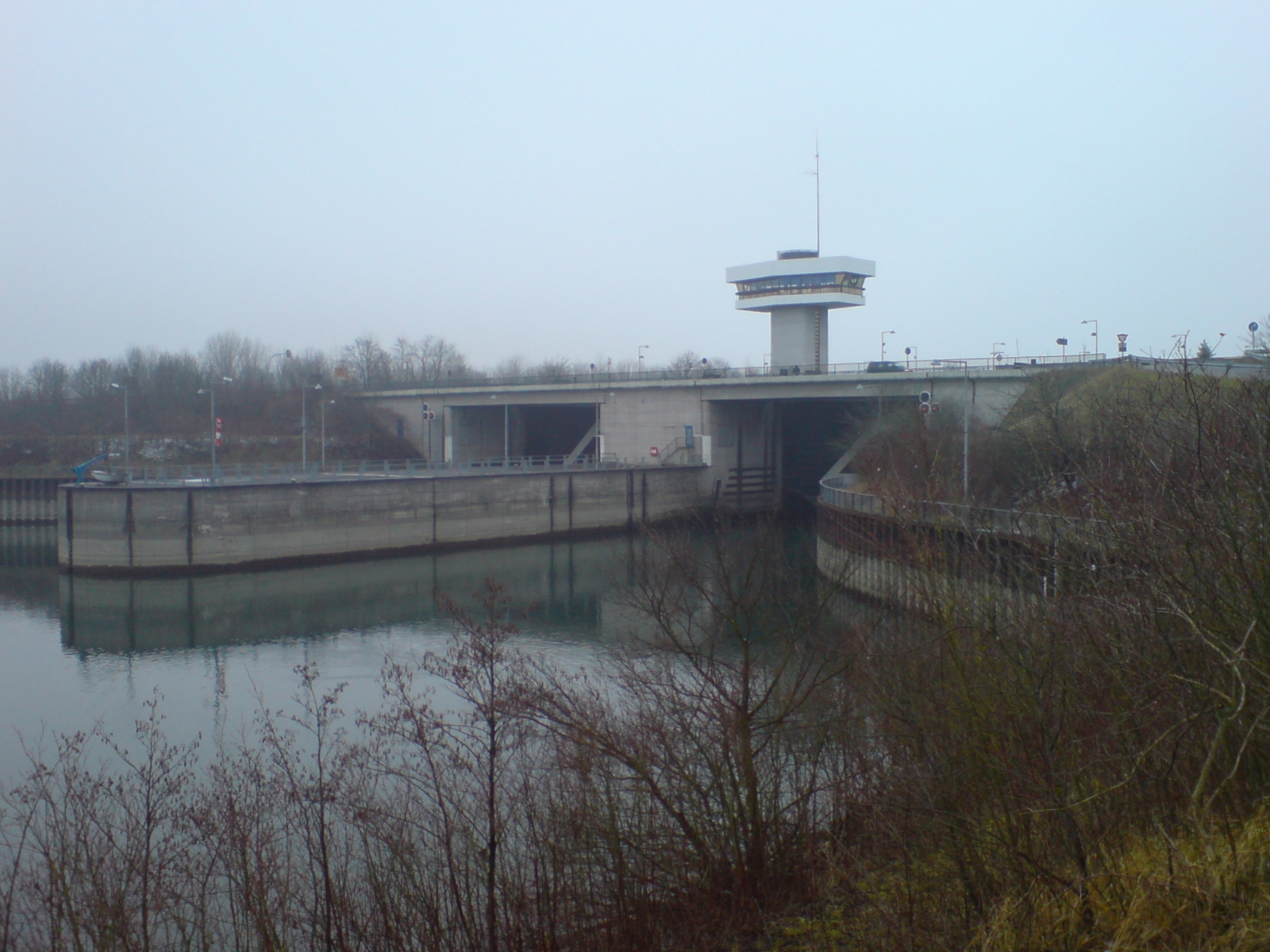
Lock entrance from the downriver side, looking roughly south-east.

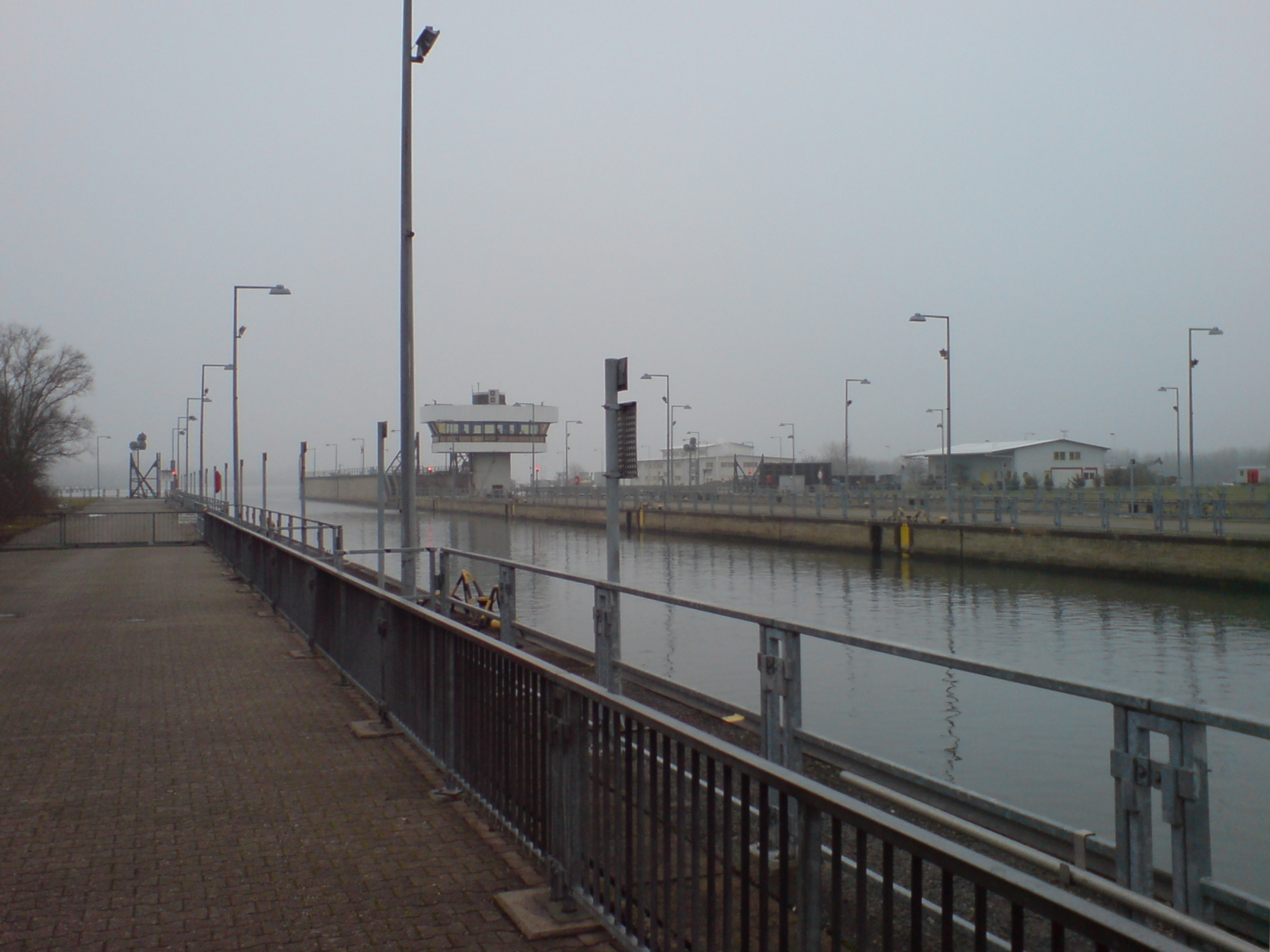
Looking south and upriver over the eastern basin.

The Iffezheim Lock (German: Schleuse Iffezheim) is a river lock on the Rhine near Iffezheim in Baden-Württemberg, Germany. The two passages of the lock serve to allow ships and barges to bypass the hydropower station on the French side of the river.

It is one of the heaviest-used locks in Germany, with a daily average of 107 commercial vessels passing through in 2003 and 30 million shipping tonnes per year. The chambers of the double lock have usable areas of 24 x 270 m. The lock is open for passage 24/7/365 and shuttles ships up or down with a water exchange rate of 165 m³/s per chamber, achieving a rise or fall of 1.5 m per minute. The lock retains at least 3.5 m water depth during normal low-water conditions.

== History ==
In 1840 the Grand Duchy of Baden and France concluded an agreement on Rhine regulation after Johann Gottfried Tulla. In 1902, the Alsatian engineer Koechlin made a push to use the water power of the Rhine. In 1928 the expansion of the Rhine began with the Grand Canal d'Alsace and the first four power stations (Kembs to Vogelgrün), four further barrages in the so-called loop solution (Marckolsheim to Strasbourg) followed in 1959. In 1969 a German-French treaty was concluded for the construction of the Gambsheim and Iffezheim barrages, to be operated in a symmetric manner. Following the completion of Gambsheim, the construction of the Iffezheim barrage started in 1974, with the French side only building and operating a weir, while the German side has lock, power station and substation for connection to the German grid. It was put into operation in 1977.

A contract to build the fish passes at Iffezheim and Gambsheim was signed in 1997. The fish pass in Iffezheim was put into operation in 2000, the one in Gambsheim in 2006. In 2009 the construction of the 5th turbine in Iffezheim started. At the end of 2011, the water law permit for the installation of a 5th turbine in the Rhine power plant Gambsheim was granted. This will increase the power plant capacity to 1420 m³/s. The additional turbine was pun into operation by 18 October 2013. f>

== Weir ==
The weir of the barrage in Iffezheim is situated on the French side of the Rhine, so that the whole barrage is approximately mirror-inverted to the next higher situated barrage Gambsheim. It consists of six weir fields, each 20 m wide. One weir field consists of a hydraulically operated flap and a chain-driven pressure segment. The weir ensures the flow of the Rhine in the event of water flows that are greater than the capacity of the power plant. The entire plant is designed for a maximum water flow of 7500 m³/s.

== Sluices ==
The double sluice consists of two sluice chambers, each 270 metres long and 24 metres wide. The difference in height between headwater and tailwater is about 12.5 metres at low water. They are one of the largest inland locks in Europe. The locks were put into operation on 14 March 1977. They are in operation 24 hours a day in three shifts and are maintained and serviced by the waterways and shipping office Freiburg. Every year, between 25,700 (2008) and 40,600 (1990) ships with approx. 24.4 (2009) to 30.9 (2000) million tonnes of goods pass through the locks in freight and cargo traffic.

== Fish pass ==
In 1987 the International Commission for the Protection of the Rhine (ICPR) has drawn up a programme of measures aimed, inter alia, at the reintroduction of salmon into the Rhine. One of the projects to this end was the construction of the fish passes at Iffezheim and Gambsheim, which was approved in the contract of 4 March 1997. The canal, which is modelled on a torrent, consists of 37 individual basins in a row with a water depth of 1.5 m and a total length of 300 m. The Iffezheim fish pass was inaugurated in 2000, Gambsheim was opened in 2006.

The construction of the fish pass in Iffezheim was financed by the two states France and Germany and the RKI GmbH. In connection with the fish pass, machine 6 was put into operation as a so-called lock current turbine. This is a Kaplan machine with 1.05 MW asynchronous generator.

The fish pass in Gambsheim, which was built subsequently, underwent a number of design changes based on the experience gained in Iffezheim.
