= Warrington Dock =

Coordinates: 53.3721°N 2.59139°W

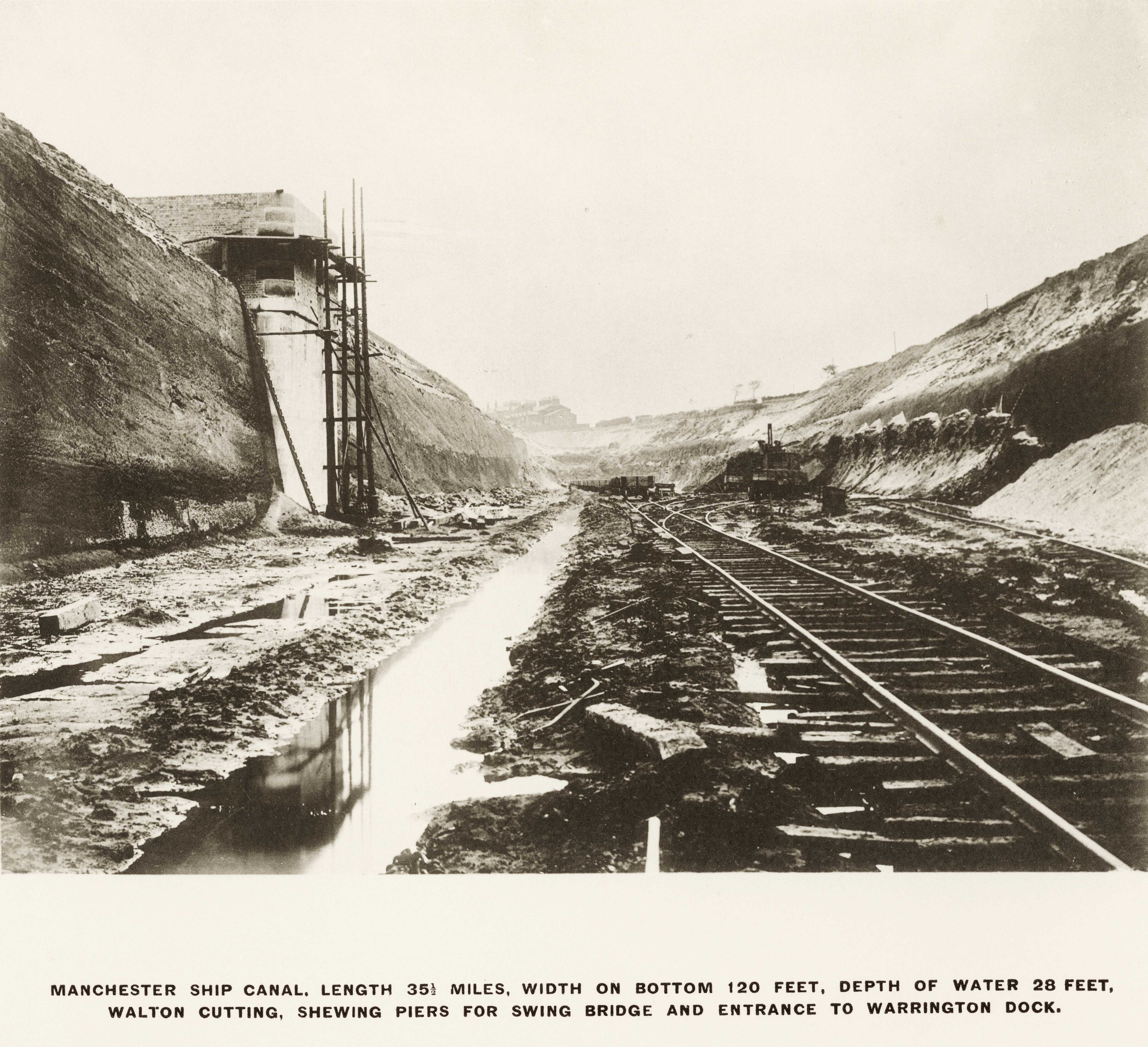
A view along the bottom of the Manchester Ship Canal at the Warrington Dock entrance

Warrington Dock was situated on the River Mersey at Warrington.

Warrington was once the furthest point navigable upstream on the River Mersey. A dock evolved to allow unloading of goods for road transport to the east.

RMS Tayleur was built at Warrington in 1853, launched 4 October 1853 and sank on its maiden voyage to Australia.

A small Warrington Dock was also provided on the Manchester Ship Canal with a lock through to the River Mersey, but the dock and lock eventually became derelict. Plans for the area include some redevelopment for housing, and the creation of a linear park called "Watersmeet", which follows the course of the cut through to the Mersey. The plan includes conservation of the structure of Walton Lock and the construction of a boom across the entrance to the dock, to prevent debris from the ship canal entering it. The basin will then be known as Waters Meet Basin, and will be developed as a wildlife haven. Navigation rights have not been expunged.
