= Mersey Basin Campaign =

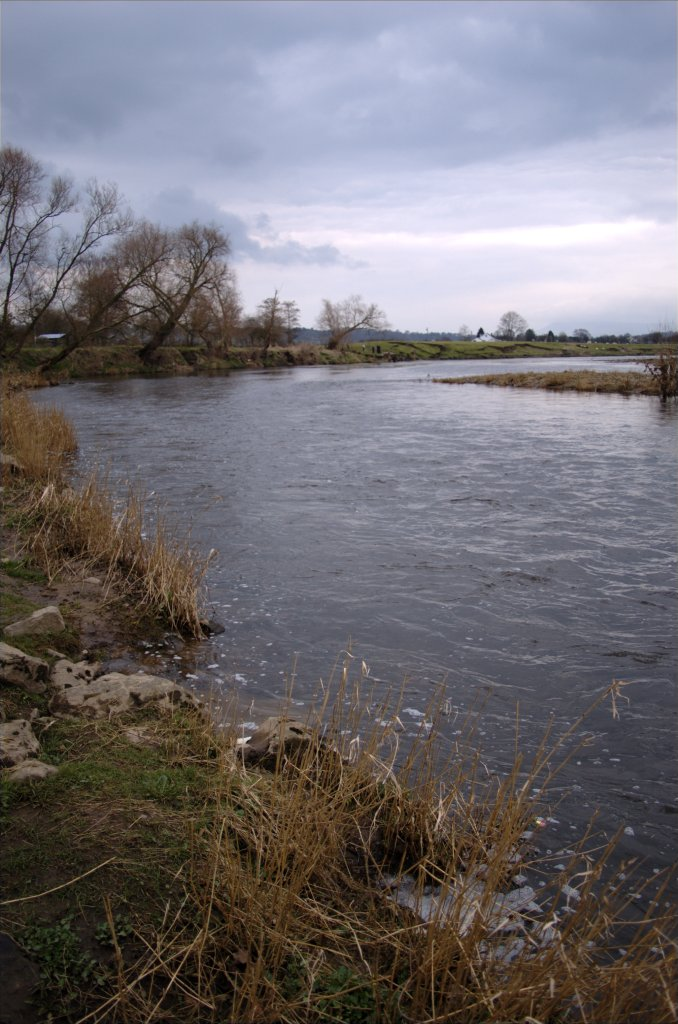

The Mersey Basin Campaign worked within the catchments of the River Mersey and the part of the River Ribble catchment within the designated Leeds and Liverpool Canal Corridor in Lancashire, in the counties of Lancashire, Merseyside, Greater Manchester and Cheshire and in the High Peak area of Derbyshire in the UK. Its primary goal was to repair the damage done by industrialisation and to foster a modern and prosperous future, with an improved environment.

== Mission ==
The campaign's mission was to:

- Improve water quality so that all rivers, streams and waters in the Mersey and Ribble catchments are clean enough to support fish by 2010.
- Encourage waterside regeneration
- Actively engage the public, private, community and voluntary sectors in the process.

== History ==
The Mersey Basin Campaign was established in 1985 in the wake of the Toxteth riots in Liverpool. Michael Heseltine, then Environment Minister in Margaret Thatcher's Conservative government, was the driving force behind its creation. He spoke of the River Mersey at the time as "an affront to the standards a civilised society should demand from its environment". It closed its doors on schedule at the end of its planned 25-year lifespan in 2010, leaving behind a river system that is cleaner now than at any time since the Industrial Revolution.

== Organisation ==
The Mersey Basin Campaign was a partnership backed by the UK Government through the sponsorship of the Department for Communities and Local Government. It was also supported by businesses, local authorities and public agencies.

The campaign worked through three bodies: The Government Office North West, The Mersey Basin Trust (initially the Mersey Basin Campaign Voluntary Sector Network established in 1987, converted to a charity in 1991) and the Mersey Basin Business Foundation (established in 1992). It also established five local authority led catchment groups - Estuary, Southern, Central, Upper and Leeds & Liverpool Canal Corridor.

In the mid 1990s, the Campaign reorganised into the Mersey Basin Business Foundation and the Healthy Waterways Trust, with continuing support from GONW. The Foundation was responsible for business and administrative tasks, as well as much of the campaign's finances, whilst the Healthy Waterways Trust is a charitable body whose main role was to administer the campaign's charitable funds. Also from the mid 1990s, the campaign was overseen by its council, which had around thirty members drawn from various public and private sector partners. The Healthy Waterways Trust (now The Mersey Rivers Trust) remained in existence following the end of the Campaign, and continued to advocate for improved water quality and waterside regeneration in the Northwest of England.

In 1999 the Campaign won the Thiess International River Prize for the world’s best river-management initiative.

The Campaign's Chairmen were Sir John Tavare (1985 - 1993), Brian Alexander (1993 - ?1996), Joe Dweck (?1996 - 2004) and Peter Batey (2004 - 2010), Lever Professor of Town and Regional Planning at the University of Liverpool.

== Local action ==
The Mersey Basin Campaign worked with communities on local projects around the North West of England through a network of action partnerships.

Action Partnerships:

Action Bollin

Action Darwen Valley

Action Douglas and Yarrow

Action Etherow and Goyt

Action Glaze

Action Irk and Roch

Action Irwell

Action Manchester Waterways

Action Medlock and Tame

Action Mersey Estuary

Action Ribble Estuary

Action Rossendale Rivers

Action Upper Weaver

Action Weaver Valley

Action Wirral Rivers

Action Worsley Brooks

== Aftermath ==
The closure of the Mersey Basin Campaign in 2010 coincided with a new governmental austerity. Many of the participants who had planned continued support for keeping the Mersey vibrant, found themselves without funding. The British Department for Food, Agriculture and Rural Affairs (Defra) introduced a comprehensive river management system based on that of the Campaign.
