= Chorltonville =

Garden village in Manchester, England

Coordinates: 53.434°N 2.279°W

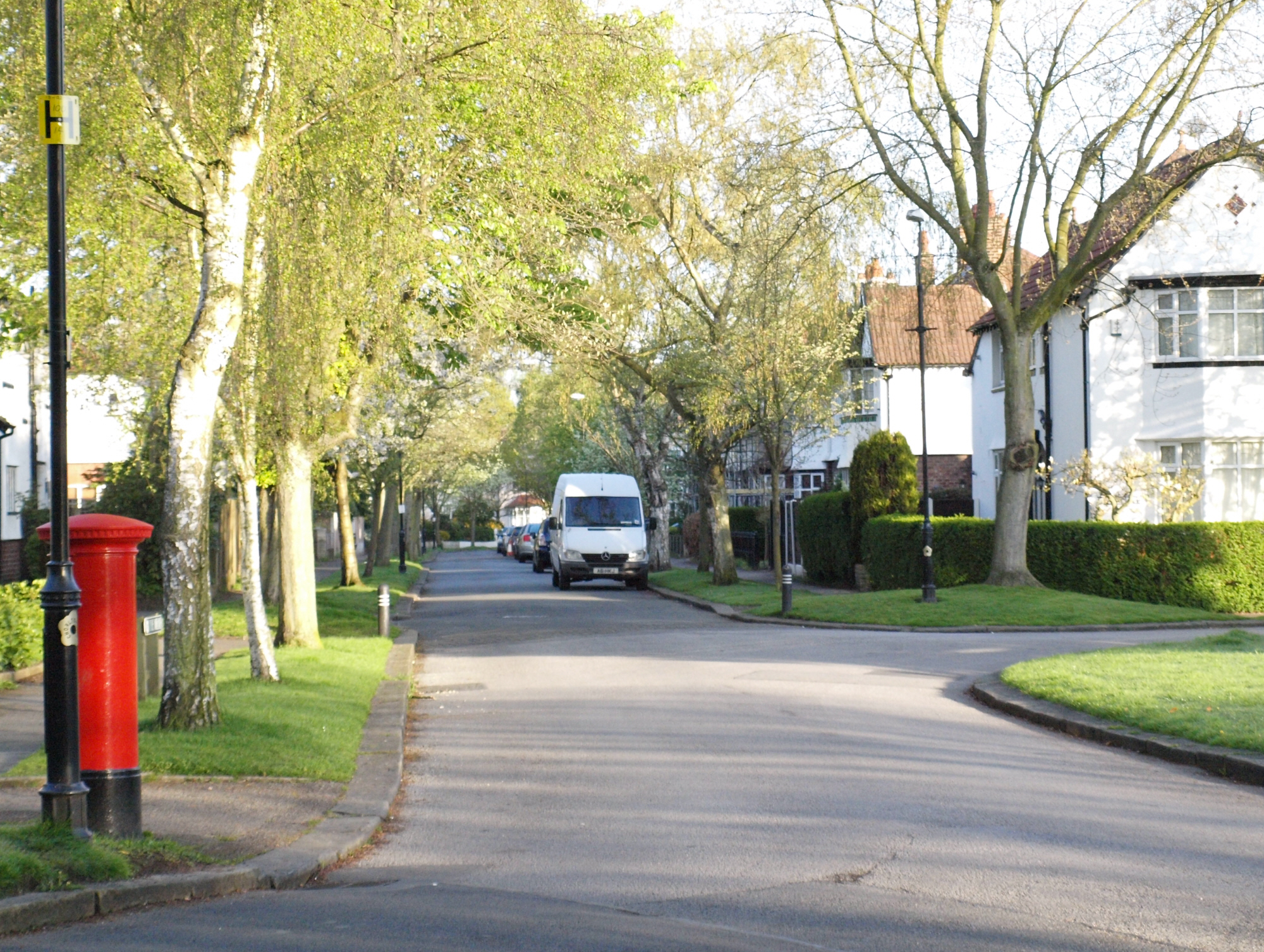
- West Meade, a typical street on the estate

- Location within Greater Manchester
- OS grid reference: SJ813930
- Metropolitan borough: City of Manchester
- Metropolitan county: Greater Manchester
- Region: North West
- Country: England
- Sovereign state: United Kingdom
- Post town: MANCHESTER
- Postcode district: M21
- Dialling code: 0161
- Police: Greater Manchester
- Fire: Greater Manchester
- Ambulance: North West
- UK Parliament: Manchester Withington

Chorltonville is a garden village in Chorlton-cum-Hardy, Manchester, England.

The village includes architecture inspired by the Arts and Crafts movement.

== Geography ==
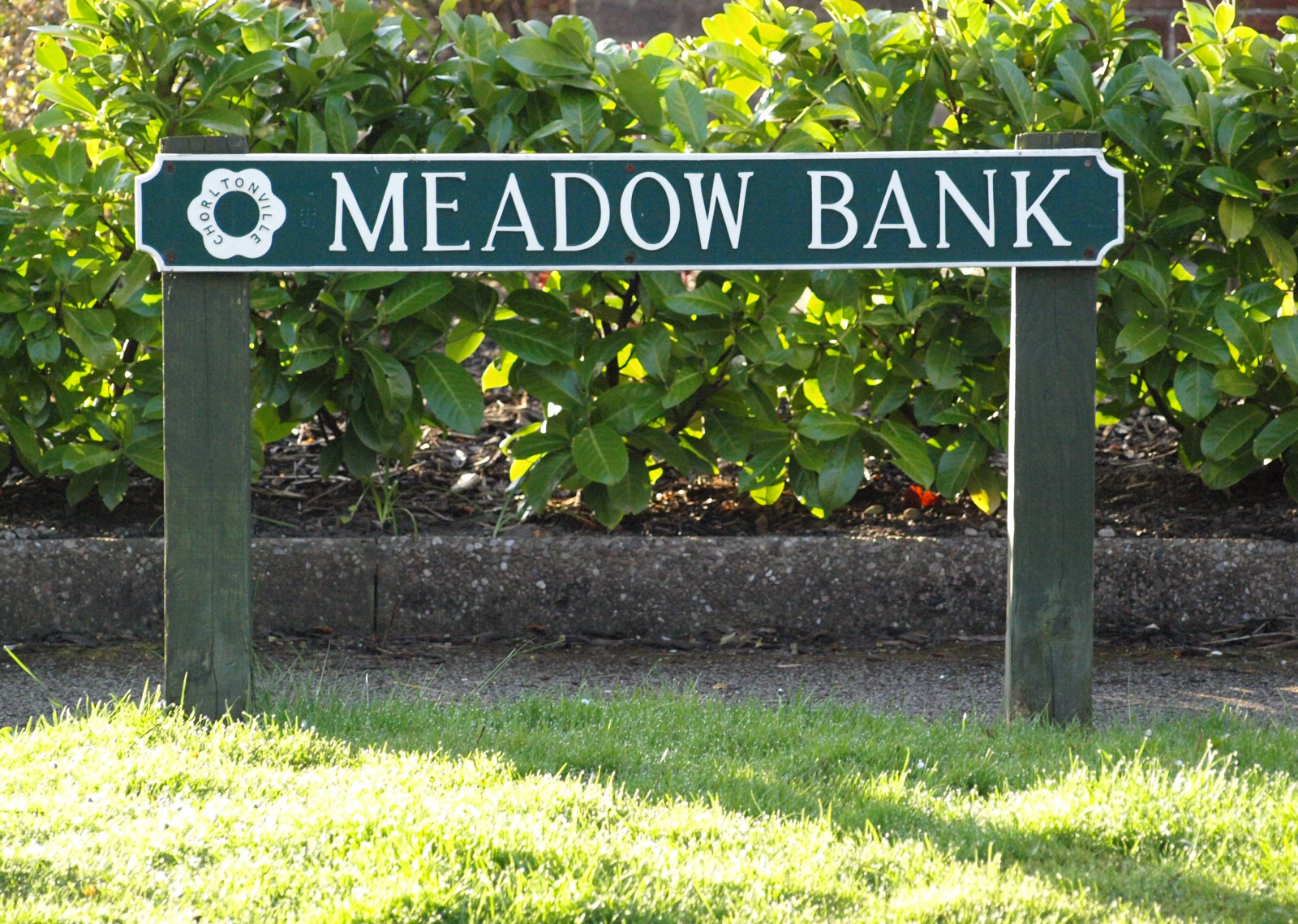
A Chorltonville road sign

The Chorltonville estate comprises 262 houses in twelve roads, centred on a "village green", The Meade. It measures about 550 yards east-west by 280 yards north-south—around 26 acres. The estate is separated from the central part of Chorlton on the north by Chorlton Brook, and on the south side borders the Hardy Lane residential area and the fields of Hardy Farm in the Mersey Valley Countryside area. Vehicular access is via Claude Road (east) or Brookburn Road (north), and there is a footpath to Hurstville Road on the south side and another towards Hardy Farm to the south-west. The estate and an adjoining football field (owned and occupied by West Didsbury & Chorlton Football Club) are one of Manchester Council's 32 conservation areas. The designation was made in 1991.

== History ==
The estate was conceived by two local businessmen, James Herbert Dawson and William John Vowles, and built between 1910 and 1911. Their objectives in building Chorltonville were:

- To provide beautiful, healthy, conveniently planned homes, with plenty of light and abundance of fresh air, at reasonable rents.
- To assist health by the provision of wide open spaces: giving ample accommodation for healthy outdoor recreation.
- By laying out a bowling green, tennis courts, and otherwise providing for the social well-being of the tenants.
- To prove that all this can be done so as to yield a satisfactory return on the capital invested.

Albert Cuneo was responsible for the design and Thomas Whiteley for the construction. Dawson and Vowles had already developed a smaller area round Darley Avenue on the site of the former Darley Hall in Old Trafford, ca. 1909. At the time most houses were not supplied with electricity though the supply in Manchester had begun nearly 20 years earlier; the Chorltonville houses were supplied both with gas and electricity so that part of the house was lit by one and part by the other.

The estate was opened on 7 October 1911 by Harry Nuttall, MP for Stretford. The houses were originally available for rental only, with annual rent starting at £24. They were intended to be occupied by skilled artisans, but were quickly taken over by professional families.

After the Second World War the Owners' Committee sold off the tennis courts and recreation area. The tennis courts were absorbed by gardens of adjoining Chorltonville houses, and the recreation area became a private football ground, currently owned by West Didsbury and Chorlton Football Club. Traffic calming measures have been taken on Claude Road.

== Characteristics of the estate ==
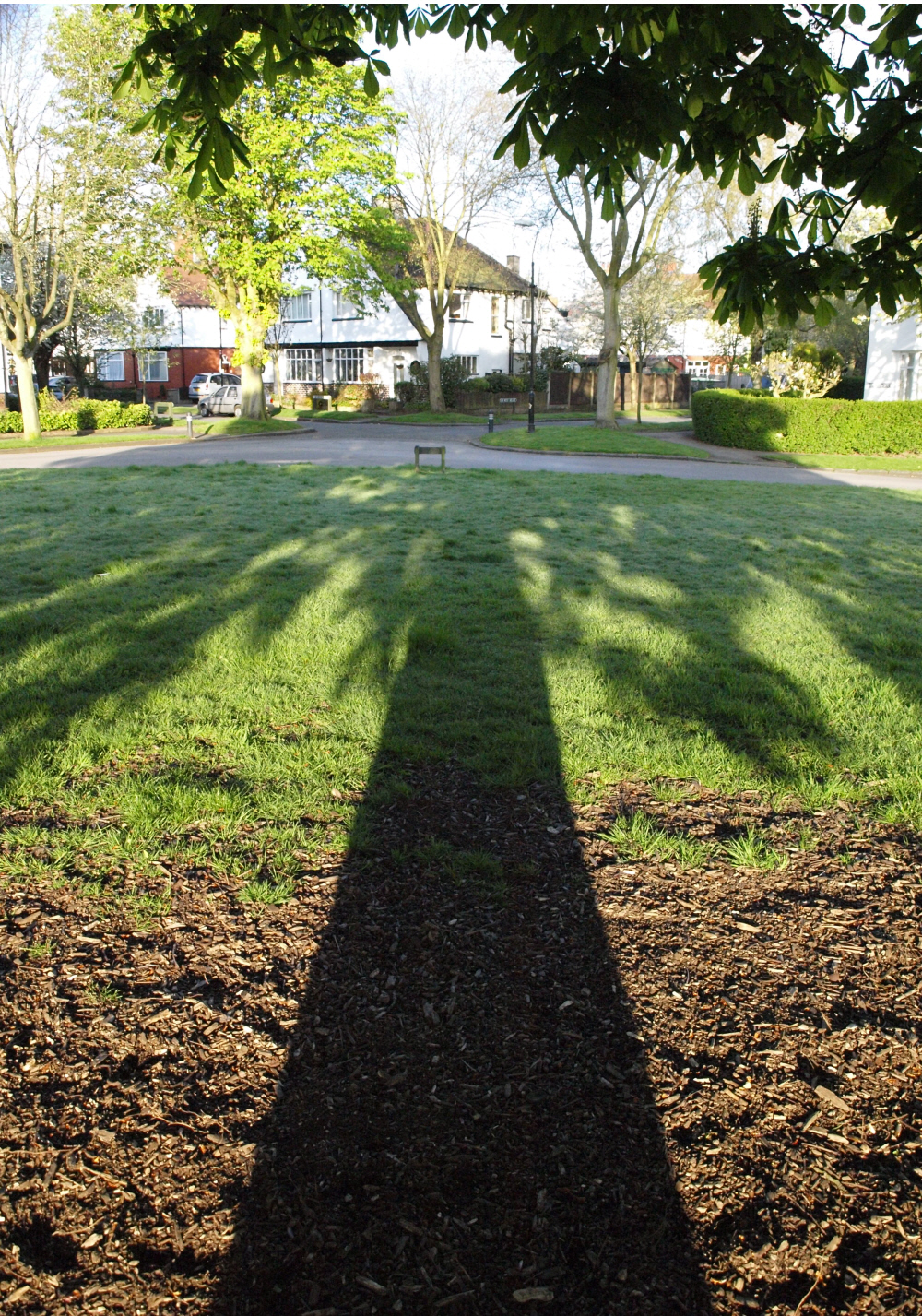
The Meade is dominated by a horse-chestnut tree.

Inspired by the Arts and Crafts Movement, the builders attempted to make Chorltonville like a rural village using various techniques:

- Curved, winding streets, emulating country lanes.
- Grass verges beside the roadways.
- Numerous trees (currently there are about 360 in the public areas).
- Diverse house styles. Each pair of semi-detached houses mirror each other, but are slightly different from other pairs in the same street.
- Use of interesting architectural details: bay windows, tile decals on gable ends and under windows, stained glass, exposed beams.
- Two "village green" areas.

Most of these features survive to the current day. Virtually all the original houses are still standing, although many have lost their stained glass. A programme of tree replacement ensures that the trees on the estate are healthy and new planting ensures their long-term well being.

== Management of the estate ==
Chorltonville is a private estate, owned in common by all its home owners. A committee drawn from volunteers among the owners is responsible for maintaining:

- Roadways and footpaths
- Grass verges
- Trees
- Drainage gullies
- Lamp posts and street furniture

To fund this work, all residents are liable for a levy (£155 in 2008) above the council tax paid to Manchester City Council.

== Cultural associations ==
In May 1964, Granada Television broadcast Blues and Gospel Train, a programme featuring Muddy Waters, Sister Rosetta Tharpe and other musicians touring with the American Folk Blues Festival, at a railway station called "Chorltonville". The programme was in fact filmed at the nearby disused Wilbraham Road railway station. In 2008 the estate was used in location filming for the BBC drama series Survivors, as the home of Abby and David Grant.

South Drive was also the location of Fitz's family home, in the ITV crime drama Cracker.
