= Chorlton Brook =

Stream in Greater Manchester, England

Chorlton Brook/ Platt Brook/ Gore Brook
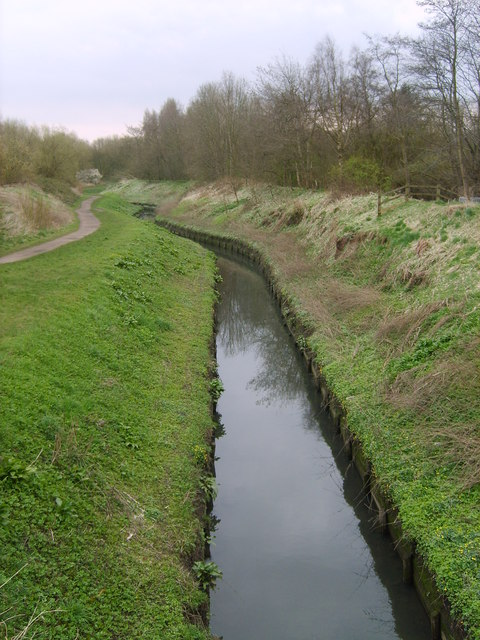

Location
- Country: England
- District: Chorlton-cum-Hardy, Manchester

Physical characteristics
- Source
  - location: Droylsden, Copperas Field
  - coordinates: 53°28′40.0″N 2°09′27.1″W
  - elevation: 92m
- Mouth
  - location: River Mersey, Sale Water Park
  - coordinates: 53°26′14″N 2°17′58.57″W

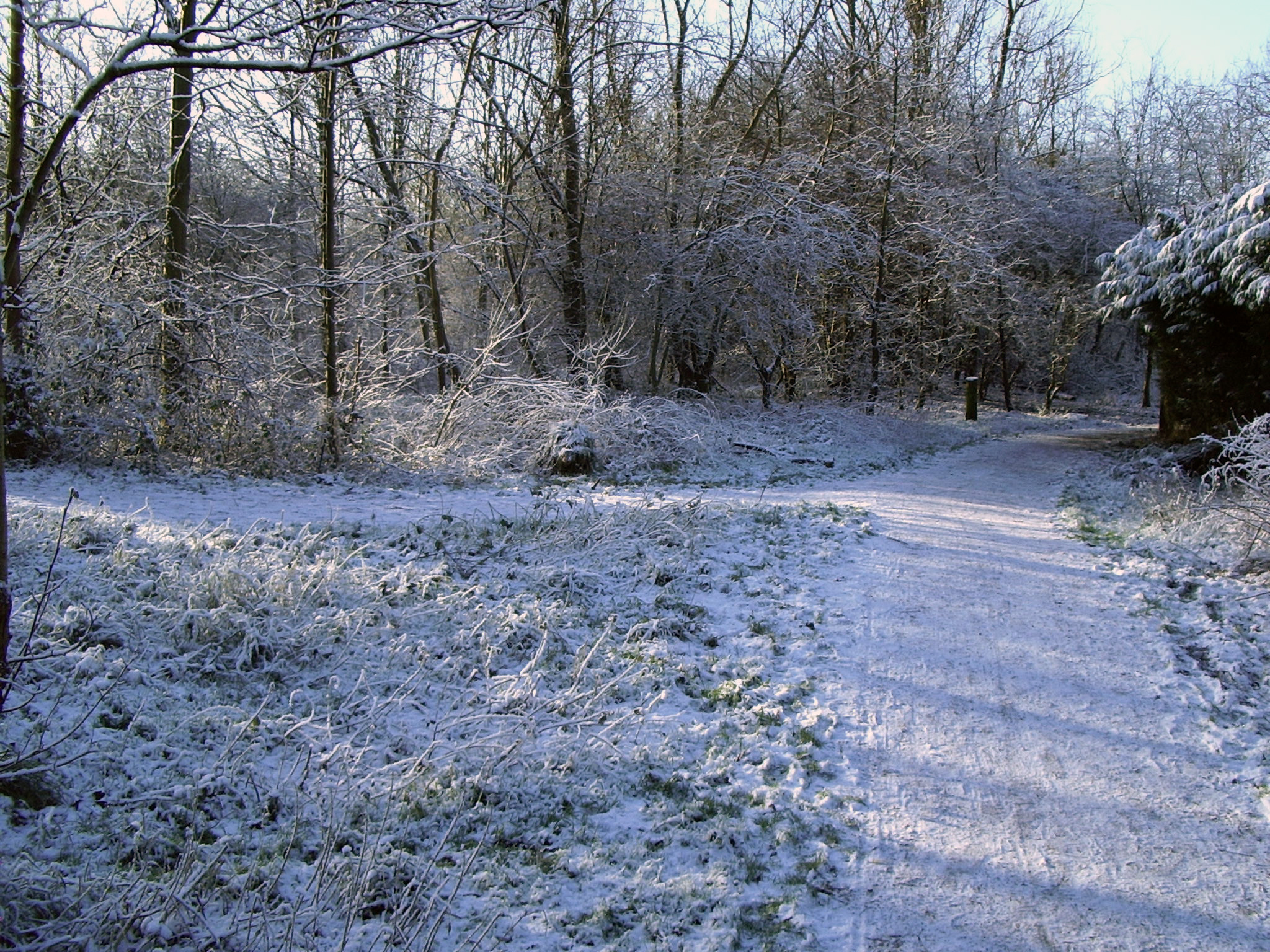
Footpaths in Chorlton Ees Nature Reserve

The Gore Brook is a stream in Greater Manchester, England, which runs in a westerly direction through Tameside, Manchester and Trafford. It starts underground in Droylsden before running by Gorton Reservoir and then comes in and out of culverts before eventually changing name to the Platt Brook upon reaching Platt Fields Park; it then becomes the Chorlton Brook when it joins with the Shaw Brook (or Red Lion Brook), and after passing north of Chorltonville it flows through Chorlton Ees into the River Mersey upstream of Sale Water Park. The Chorlton Brook separated the settlements of Hardy (to the south) and Chorlton (to the north).

== Geography ==
Chorlton Ees is an area of floodplain on the right bank of the Mersey once used as water meadow and pasture. Gradually flood control measures were developed to reduce the disruption caused by periodic floods (e.g. the stone weir further down the course). In the 19th century it became an area of waste disposal and the Withington Sewage Farm was established on part of the site of which remains may still be seen. (At that time the area was in Withington Urban District.) The tendency for housing to be needed for an expanding population led to Chorltonville and other much smaller plots encroaching on the meadowland. More recently it has been converted in parts to a nature reserve, Chorlton Ees and Ivy Green Nature Reserve.

Chorltonville recreation area became a private football ground, currently owned by West Didsbury & Chorlton Football Club. In 2009 a proposed development of football pitches and a clubhouse, to provide facilities for local youth, particularly from the social housing estates, became the subject of some local opposition. The development is proposed by the club and has aroused opposition from some local residents. In May 2010 the issue reemerged with a modified proposal from the club which has aroused the same opposition once more.

== Tributaries ==
- Red Lion Brook
  - Shaw Brook
  - Fog Lane Brook
  - Ball Brook
- Gore Brook/Platt Brook
  - Dog Kennel Brook
    - Longford Brook
  - Ley Brook
    - Willow Brook
    - Black Brook(Burnage)
  - Fallowfield brook
    - Print Works Brook
  - Crowcroft Brook
  - Levenshulme Road Brook
  - Dodgeleech Brook
  - Dick Lane Brook
