= List of crossings of the River Mersey =

List of crossings of the River Mersey.

Key to heritage status
Status	Criteria
I	Grade I listed. Bridge of exceptional interest, sometimes considered to be internationally important
II*	Grade II* listed. Particularly important bridge of more than special interest
II	Grade II listed. Bridge of national importance and special interest

Crossing	Date	Coordinates	Heritage status	Locality	Notes	Image
Confluence of River Goyt and River Tame		53.4143°N 2.1567°W	-	Stockport	Start of River Mersey	Tame_and_Goyt_become_Mersey_-_geograph.org.uk_-_7723
Knightsbridge		53.4138°N 2.1580°W	-	Stockport		Knightsbridge_View_-_geograph.org.uk_-_2884827
Merseyway Shopping Centre		53.4111°N 2.1591°W	-	Stockport	River in culvert	Merseyway_Shopping_Centre_-_geograph.org.uk_-_2074422
Wellington Bridge	1826	53.4092°N 2.1625°W	II		A6	Wellington_Bridge,_Stockport
Astley St Bridge		53.4093°N 2.1647°W	-	Stockport		The newest bridge across the Mersey_-_geograph.org.uk_-_6212439
Stockport Viaduct	1840	53.4089°N 2.1653°W	II*	Stockport		Stockport_Viaduct
King St Bridge		53.4092°N 2.1669°W	-	Stockport		Stockport_Viaduct
Hollywood Way Bridge		53.4074°N 2.1739°W	-	Stockport		Hollywood Way Bridge - geograph.org.uk - 2350478
Brinksway Bridge		53.4071°N 2.1745°W	-	Stockport		Hollywood Way Bridge, Stockport (geograph 6600725)
Geoff Funnell Bridge		53.4058°N 2.1864°W	-		Pedestrian	Footbridge over the River Mersey (geograph 6594618)
M60 Bridge		53.4059°N 2.1911°W	-	Stockport	M60	M60_bridge_over_River_Mersey_-_geograph.org.uk_-_3349077
Former Railway Bridge		53.406°N 2.1933°W	-	Didsbury	Manchester to Derby line. Dismantled	
Cheadle Bridge		53.4055°N 2.2185°W	-	Didsbury		Cheadle_Bridge,_River_Mersey_-_geograph.org.uk_-_3515031
Kingsway		53.4014°N 2.2251°W	-	Didsbury		Kingsway_bridge,_Didsbury_-_geograph.org.uk_-_69950
Mersey Viaduct		53.4011°N 2.2264°W	-	Didsbury	Styal Line	Rail_bridge_over_River_Mersey_South_of_East_Didsbury_-_geograph.org.uk_-_2239604
Simons Bridge		53.4125°N 2.2422°W	-	Didsbury	Pedestrian	Simons_Bridge,_Didsbury
M60 Bridge		53.408°N 2.2503°W	-	Wythenshawe	M60	M60_Bridge_Over_River_Mersey,_Northenden_-_geograph.org.uk_-_2623234
Tatton Arms Bridge		53.4088°N 2.2529°W	-	Wythenshawe	Pedestrian	Tatton_Arms_footbridge_-_geograph.org.uk_-_2044342
M60 Bridge		53.4114°N 2.254°W	-	Wythenshawe	M60	M60_and_B5167_bridges_over_the_river_Mersey_-_geograph.org.uk_-_634594
Palatine Road Bridge		53.4121°N 2.2539°W	-	Wythenshawe	B5167	M60_and_B5167_bridges_over_the_river_Mersey_-_geograph.org.uk_-_634594
Princess Parkway Bridge		53.4162°N 2.2635°W	-	Wythenshawe	Main and slip road bridges and footbridges	Princess_Parkway_Bridge_-_geograph.org.uk_-_3058513
Footbridge		53.4214°N 2.2695°W	-	Chorlton Water Park		River_Mersey,_Bridge_at_Chorlton_Water_Park_-_geograph.org.uk_-_2878255
Metrolink Bridge		53.4294°N 2.286°W	-	Sale	Manchester Airport line	Metrolink_Bridge_-_geograph.org.uk_-_4093492
Jackson's Bridge	1881	53.4302°N 2.2868°W	II	Sale	Pedestrian	Jackson's_Bridge_-_geograph.org.uk_-_4445816
Barfoot Bridge		53.4365°N 2.3083°W	-	Sale	Footbridge and Metrolink (Altrincham line)	Barfoot Bridge - geograph.org.uk - 4451326
Bridgewater Canal Aqueduct	1776	53.4366°N 2.3089°W	II	Sale		River_Mersey_at_Barfoot_Bridge_-_geograph.org.uk_-_1297465
M60 Bridge		53.4358°N 2.3123°W	-	Sale	Main and slip road bridges	River_Mersey_-_geograph.org.uk_-_5360007
Crossford Bridge		53.4347°N 2.316°W	-	Sale	A56, separate bridge for each carriageway	
Carrington Spur Bridge		53.4383°N 2.3435°W	-	Ashton	A6144	Ashton Bridge & Millennium Footbridge - geograph-4067883
Ashton Millennium Bridge		53.4385°N 2.3438°W	-	Ashton	Pedestrian	The_River_Mersey_passes_over_a_weir_under_a_footbridge_-_geograph.org.uk_-_4066656
Flixton Bridge		53.44°N 2.3895°W	-	Flixton		Flixton_Bridge_-_geograph.org.uk_-_1427903
Cadishead Viaduct	1893	53.4246°N 2.4279°W	-	Cadishead	Manchester Ship Canal joins the Mersey in this section	Cadishead_Viaduct_-_geograph.org.uk_-_2301708
Warburton High Level Bridge	1893	53.4075°N 2.459°W	-	Warburton		Manchester_Ship_Canal,_Warburton_High_Level_(Toll)_Bridge_-_geograph.org.uk_-_4952661
Works Access Bridge		53.3971°N 2.4819°W	-	Thelwall		Butchersfield_Canal_-_geograph.org.uk_-_4952685
Works Access Bridge		53.3947°N 2.5069°W	-	Thelwall		Thelwall southbound (geograph 6366289)
Thelwall Viaduct	1963/1996	53.3945°N 2.5076°W	-	Thelwall	Also crosses Manchester Ship Canal	The newer Thelwall Viaduct (geograph 6366291)
Woolston Weir and footbridge		53.3939°N 2.5222°W	-	Warrington		Woolston_Weir_-_geograph.org.uk_-_2260957
Kingsway Bridge		53.3879°N 2.5656°W	-	Warrington	A50	Kingsway_crosses_the_Mersey_-_geograph.org.uk_-_1538921
Howley Bridge	1912	53.3873°N 2.5787°W	II	Warrington	Pedestrian	Footbridge_over_River_Mersey_-_geograph.org.uk_-_1009592
Warrington New Bridge/Warringon Bridge		53.386°N 2.5906°W	-	Warrington	Gyratory System	Mersey_Street_Bridge,_Warrington,_Lancs
Arpley Railway Bridge		53.3849°N 2.5927°W	-	Warrington		Arpley_Bridge,_Warrington_-_geograph.org.uk_-_2824328
Arpley New Bridge		53.3835°N 2.5929°W	-	Warrington		Bridge_over_the_River_Mersey,_Warrington_-_geograph.org.uk_-_1055029
Centre Park Link Bridge		53.3747°N 2.5987°W	-	Warrington		
Mersey Viaduct		53.3744°N 2.6048°W	-	Warrington	Chester–Warrington line. Includes footbridge	
Mersey Viaduct		53.3747°N 2.6058°W	-	Warrington	West Coast Main Line	From_a_train_-_bridge_across_the_Mersey_-_geograph.org.uk_-_4339592
Works Access Bridge		53.3821°N 2.6091°W	-	Warrington		Replacement_for_a_transporter_bridge_-_geograph.org.uk_-_2161536
Warrington Transporter Bridge	1915	53.3838°N 2.6075°W	II*	Warrington		Warrington_transporter_bridge_10_sep_18
Forrest Way Bridge		53.3792°N 2.6172°W	-	Warrington		
Mersey Gateway Bridge	2017	53.3528°N 2.713°W	-	Runcorn		The_Mersey_Gateway_Bridge_viewed_from_Halton_Castle_in_Runcorn,_Cheshire,_England_(cropped)
Widnes–Runcorn Transporter Bridge	1905	53.3466°N 2.7363°W	-	Runcorn	Dismantled 1961	Runcorn_transporter_bridge_(Wonder_Book_of_Engineering_Wonders,_1931)
Silver Jubilee Bridge	1961	53.3466°N 2.7377°W	II	Runcorn		Approaching_the_Runcorn_Bridge_on_foot_(9)
Runcorn Railway Bridge	1868	53.3468°N 2.7384°W	II*	Runcorn	Liverpool Branch of West Coast Main Line	Runcorn_Railway_Bridge_-_geograph.org.uk_-_961378
Mersey Railway Tunnel	1886	53.3997°N 3.0026°W	-	Liverpool		
Queensway Tunnel	1934	53.4006°N 3.004°W	II	Liverpool	Entrances listed	Queensway_Tunnel,_River_Mersey-geograph-3147374
Mersey Ferry		53.4046°N 2.9982°W	-	Liverpool		Ferry_cross_the_Mersey_-_geograph.org.uk_-_2166235
Kingsway Tunnel	1971	53.4131°N 3.0098°W	-	Liverpool	Twin Bore	Entering_Kingsway_Tunnel_2018
