= Mersey Valley Way =

13-mile trail in Greater Manchester, England

- Length: 13 miles (21 km)
- Location: Greater Manchester, England
- Completed: June 2026
- Use: Walking, cycling
- Season: All year
- Hazards: Severe weather

The Mersey Valley Way is a 13-mile (21 km) National River Walk in Greater Manchester, England. It runs along the River Mersey from Stockport through Manchester to Trafford. The scheme was announced in December 2025 by the Department for Environment, Food and Rural Affairs, and is presented as the first of nine new National River Walks outlined in the government's manifesto. The project aims to improve public access to riverside landscapes, support local regeneration initiatives, and enhance walking infrastructure by upgrading sections of existing paths, including parts of the Trans Pennine Trail.

== History ==
Plans for the Mersey Valley Way emerged from long‑running initiatives to improve public access to the River Mersey corridor in Greater Manchester. Since the late 20th century, local authorities in Stockport, Manchester, and Trafford have undertaken regeneration and environmental projects intended to restore the Mersey Valley as a continuous green space. Multi‑agency partnerships involving Trafford Council, Manchester‑area organisations, and environmental groups supported coordinated conservation work and measures to expand public recreation along the river.

During the 2000s and 2010s, incremental upgrades to footpaths, bridges, and wayfinding – often linked to the Trans Pennine Trail and local cycling initiatives – contributed to the development of a more coherent long‑distance walking route. Proposals for a formalised river walk gained momentum within wider regional strategies promoting active travel, biodiversity enhancement, and the creation of connected blue‑green corridors, including initiatives such as Greater Manchester's CyanLines programme.

The concept of a dedicated Mersey Valley Way was formally advanced in the mid‑2020s, when national policy – supported by a government manifesto commitment to create nine National River Walks – included an emphasis on long‑distance routes centred on rivers and waterways. The route was formally announced on 27 December 2025 by the Department for Environment, Food and Rural Affairs (Defra), which identified the Mersey corridor as the first candidate for National River Walk designation. Delivery has been led by the Mersey Rivers Trust in partnership with Defra, together with a coalition of local councils and environmental bodies, among them Stockport Council, the Lancashire Wildlife Trust, The Conservation Volunteers, Groundwork UK, and City of Trees, supported by Manchester and Trafford councils.

Initial upgrades and wayfinding for the Mersey Valley Way were expected to be completed by spring 2026, according to early local reporting, although no formal completion date had been issued by Defra or the Mersey Rivers Trust as of January 2026.

The Mersey Valley Way was officially opened on 21 May 2026 by the government's Access Minister, Baroness Hayman. A subsequent Defra announcement in June 2026 confirmed the completion and launch of the route.

== Route ==
The Mersey Valley Way follows the River Mersey for approximately 13 miles (21 km) between Stockport and Trafford, making use of existing riverside paths and upgraded sections of the Trans Pennine Trail. The eastern trailhead is near Stockport town centre, close to the confluence of the rivers Goyt and Tame, where the Mersey begins. From here, the route follows established riverside paths westwards.

Beyond Stockport, the trail continues through Didsbury, passing near Fletcher Moss Park and its adjacent nature reserve, before entering the wider green spaces of the Mersey Valley. It then follows long-standing riverside tracks through Chorlton-cum-Hardy and Chorlton Water Park, linking with local walking and cycling routes.

West of Chorlton, the route runs past Sale Water Park, connecting with the Trans Pennine Trail near Jackson's Boat Bridge, a well‑used crossing point on the Mersey.

The western end of the route terminates in Trafford, close to existing public transport links and recreational areas. Along its length, the Mersey Valley Way provides continuous, waymarked access to the riverbank, with improved surfacing, signage and accessibility features at key points.

== See also ==
- GM Ringway, a long-distance walking trail in Greater Manchester
