= River Mersey =

Major river emptying into Liverpool Bay

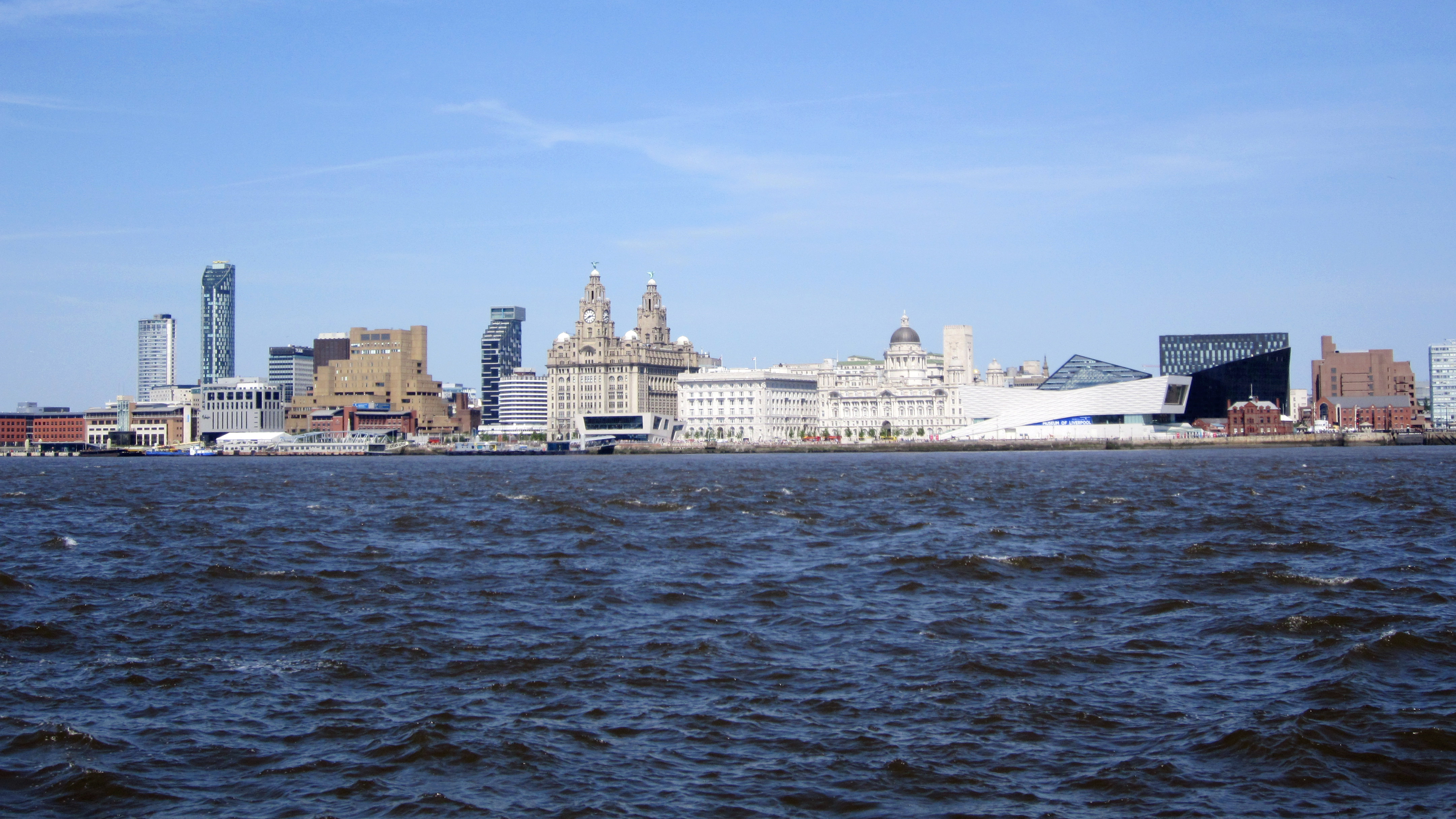
- The River Mersey with the city of Liverpool skyline in the background, including the Royal Liver Building and Pier Head

Location
- Country: England
- Counties: Greater Manchester, Cheshire, Merseyside, Lancashire (Historic)
- Cities: Liverpool, Manchester

Physical characteristics
- Source: (source of the River Tame)
  - location: west of Buckstones Moss, West Yorkshire
  - coordinates: 53.6187°N 2.0035°W
  - elevation: 1,552 ft (473 m)
- 2nd source: (confluence of Tame and Goyt)
  - location: Stockport, Greater Manchester
  - coordinates: 53.4143°N 2.1565°W
  - elevation: 130 ft (40 m)
- Mouth
  - location: Liverpool Bay
- Length: 69 mi (111 km)
- Basin size: 1,810 sq mi (4,680 km^{2})

Basin features
- Designation

Ramsar Wetland
- Official name: Mersey Estuary
- Designated: 20 December 1995
- Reference no.: 785

The River Mersey (/ˈmɜːrzi/) is a major river in North West England. Its name derives from Old English and means "boundary river", possibly referring to its having been a border between the ancient kingdoms of Mercia and Northumbria. For centuries it has formed part of the boundary between the historic counties of Lancashire and Cheshire.

The Mersey is currently regarded as starting at the confluence of the River Tame and River Goyt in the centre of Stockport. However, older definitions, and many older maps, place its start at the confluence of the Etherow and Goyt, near Marple, about 4 miles (6.4 km) further upstream.

It flows westwards through south Manchester, then into the Manchester Ship Canal near Irlam Locks, becoming a part of the canal and maintaining its water levels. After 4 miles (6.4 km) it exits the canal, flowing towards Warrington where it widens. It then narrows as it passes between Runcorn and Widnes. The river widens into a large estuary, which is 3 miles (4.8 km) across at its widest point near Ellesmere Port. The course of the river then turns northwards as the estuary narrows between Liverpool and Birkenhead on the Wirral Peninsula to the west, and empties into Liverpool Bay. In total the river flows 69 miles (111 km).

Part of the Mersey Railway, a rail tunnel between Birkenhead and Liverpool, opened in 1886. Two road tunnels pass under the estuary from Liverpool: the Queensway Tunnel opened in 1934 connecting the city to Birkenhead, and the Kingsway Tunnel, opened in 1971, to Wallasey. A road bridge, completed in 1961 and later named the Silver Jubilee Bridge, crosses between Runcorn and Widnes, adjacent to the Runcorn Railway Bridge which opened in 1868. A second road bridge, the Mersey Gateway, opened in October 2017, carrying a six-lane road connecting Runcorn's Central Expressway with Speke Road and Queensway in Widnes. The Mersey Ferry operates between the Pier Head in Liverpool and Woodside in Birkenhead and Seacombe, and has become a tourist attraction offering cruises that provide an overview of the river and surrounding areas.

Water quality in the Mersey was severely affected by industrialisation, and in 1985, the Mersey Basin Campaign was established to improve water quality and encourage waterside regeneration. In 2009 it was announced that the river is "cleaner than at any time since the industrial revolution" and is "now considered one of the cleanest in the UK". The Mersey Valley Countryside Warden Service manages local nature reserves such as Chorlton Ees and Sale Water Park.

The river gave its name to Merseybeat, developed by bands from Liverpool, notably the Beatles. In 1965 it was the subject of the top-ten hit single "Ferry Cross the Mersey" by Gerry and the Pacemakers.

== Etymology ==
The name "Mersey" is derived from the Anglo-Saxon mǣres, 'of a boundary' and ēa, 'a river'. The Mersey was possibly the 'border river' between Mercia and Northumbria. Its Welsh name is Afon Merswy. Prior to Anglo-Saxon conquest of the region, the river was almost certainly known by a Celtic name - recorded by Ptolemy as "Seteia" (as the Southern border of the Brittonic "Setantii" tribe). "Seteia" and "Setantii" both lack clear Celtic roots, leading some to suggest that this was likely a corruption of the actual name. Some, including David Parsons, have suggested the original forms "Segeia" and "Segantii" - based on the root "sego" meaning "strong". Andrew Breeze instead suggests the original forms "Meteia" and "Metantii" - from "met" meaning "cut" or "harvest" - with the likely meaning being that the Metantii were "reapers (of men), cutters-down (of enemies)", with the river Meteia meaning "reaping one" or "she that cuts down" (Breeze notes the possibility of a local deity associated with the river, but highlights that this is only a supposition based on known deities like Sulis and Aerfen).

== Course ==
The Mersey is formed from three tributaries: the River Etherow, the River Goyt and the River Tame. The modern accepted start of the Mersey is at the confluence of the Tame and Goyt, in central Stockport, Greater Manchester. However, older definitions, and many older maps, place its start a few miles up the Goyt at Compstall; for example the 1911 Encyclopædia Britannica states "It is formed by the junction of the Goyt and the Etherow a short distance below Marple in Cheshire on the first-named stream." The 1784 John Stockdale map shows the River Mersey extending to Mottram, and forming the boundary between Cheshire and Derbyshire. In the west of Stockport it flows at the base of a cliff below the road called Brinksway before reaching flat country. An early Ordnance Survey map indicates the spring at Red Hole on the border of Cheshire and Yorkshire at the head of one of the Etherow's longest headwaters, as being the Source of the River Mersey.

=== Stockport to Warrington ===
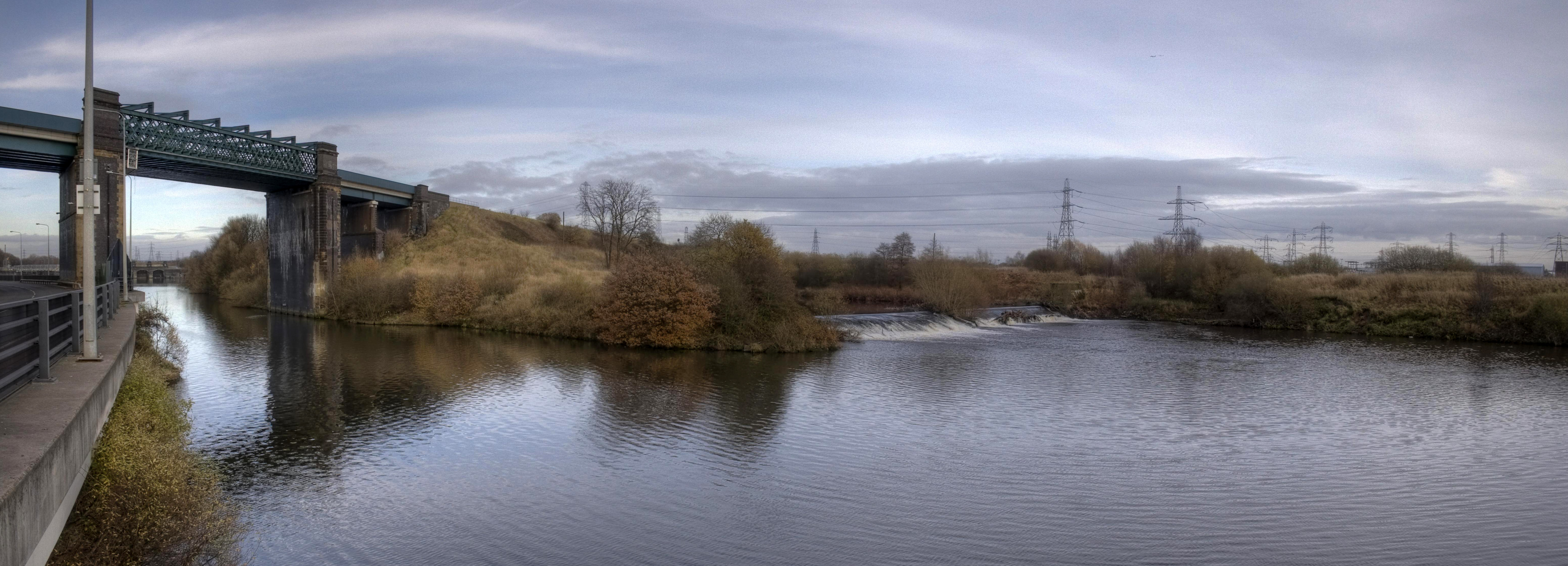
The River Mersey empties into the Manchester Ship Canal at Flixton, near Irlam Locks.

From Central Stockport the river flows through or past Heaton Mersey, Didsbury, Northenden, Chorlton-cum-Hardy, Stretford, Sale, Ashton on Mersey, Urmston and Flixton, where it flows into the Manchester Ship Canal just south of Irlam Locks. At this point the Ship Canal is the canalised section of the River Irwell. The old course of the Mersey has been obliterated by the canal past Hollins Green to Rixton although the old river bed can be seen outside Irlam and at Warburton. At Rixton the River Bollin enters the canal from the south and the Mersey leaves the canal to the north, meandering through Woolston, where the ship canal company's dredgings have formed the Woolston Eyes nature reserve, and on to Warrington.

During the construction of the Manchester Ship Canal, the original course of the river through Wilderspool (which is north of Stockton Heath and Lower Walton) was diverted westward into a canalised section. Wilderspool Causeway remains the only remnant of the original eastern bank of the Mersey at this point in Warrington. Part of the original river channel became Warrington Dock (Walton Lock) in the ship canal. In the 1960s, the former river channel was filled. The area is now Wilderspool Causeway Park. At the western end of the canalised section in Warrington is the old entrance to the former Runcorn to Latchford Canal. This waterway was abandoned with the construction of the ship canal. It was constructed because the Mersey is tidal from Howley Weir in Warrington. The canal let river traffic reach Warrington during low tides.

During high spring tides, water levels often top the Howley Weir. Before construction of the ship canal, work to improve navigation on the Mersey included Woolston New Cut, bypassing a meander, and Howley Lock for craft to avoid the weir; the new cut and lock are still evident. The island formed between the weir and the lock is known locally as "Monkey Island".

=== Runcorn Gap ===
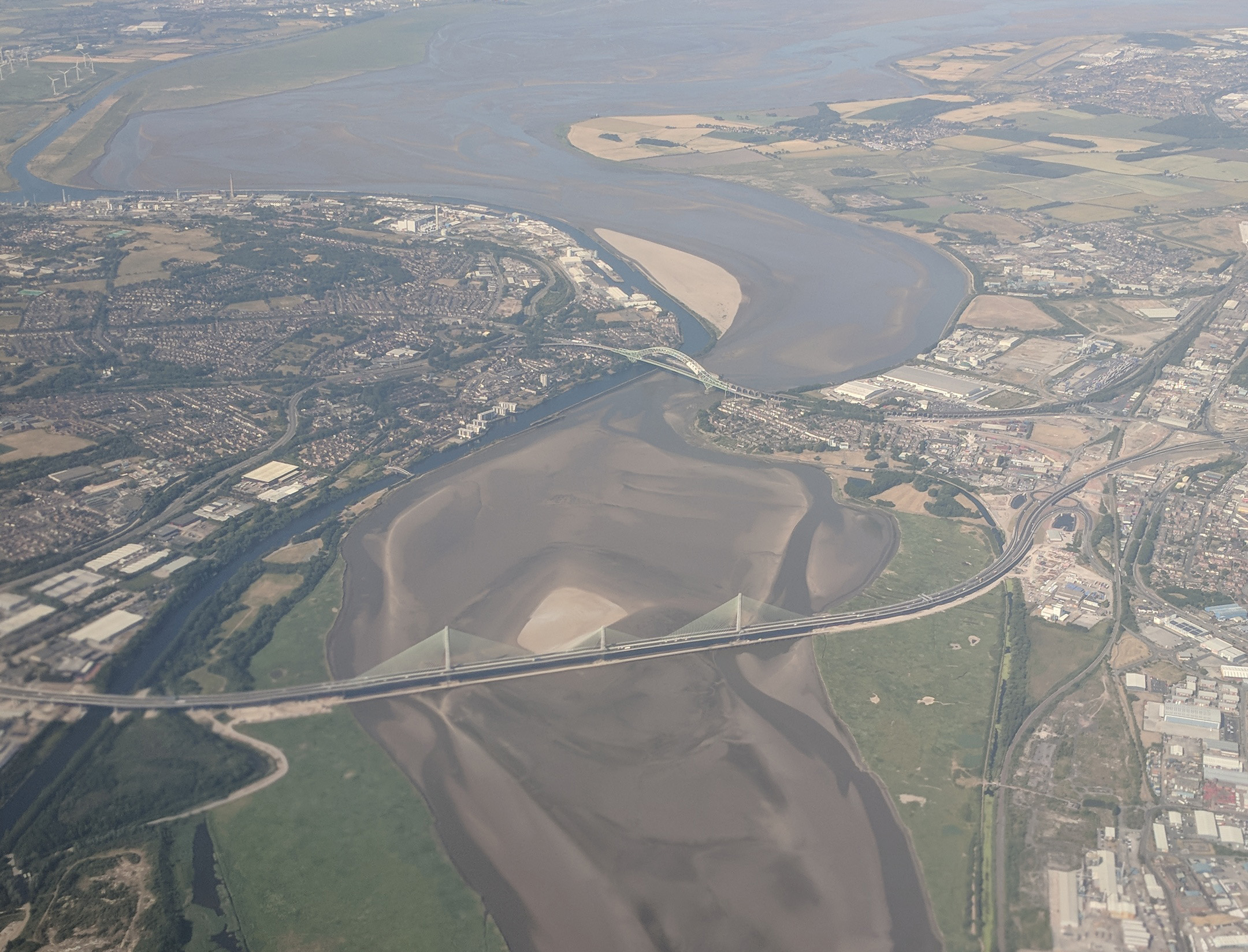
Aerial view of the Runcorn Gap

West of Warrington the river widens, and then narrows as it passes through the Runcorn Gap between the towns of Runcorn and Widnes, in Halton. The Manchester Ship Canal passes through the gap to the south of the river. The gap is bridged by the Silver Jubilee Bridge and Runcorn Railway Bridge. Another crossing, the Mersey Gateway road bridge opened in October 2017, and is situated about 1 mile upstream from the Runcorn Gap where the river is considerably wider.

=== Estuary ===
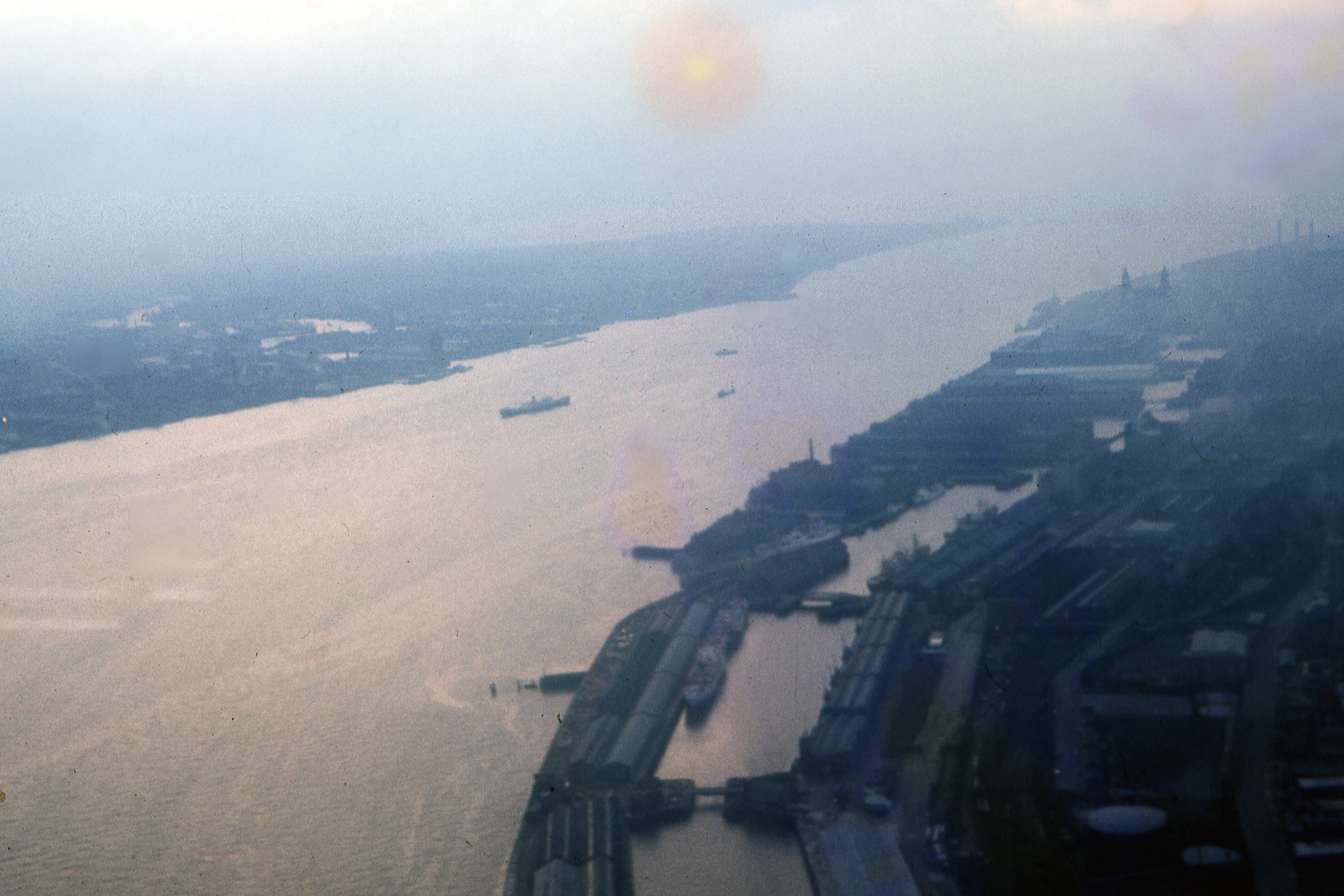
An aerial image of the estuary in 1962

From the Runcorn Gap, the river widens into a large estuary, which is 3 miles (4.8 km) wide at its widest point near Ellesmere Port. The course of the river then heads north, with Liverpool to the east and the Wirral Peninsula to the west. The Manchester Ship Canal enters the river at Eastham Locks. The eastern part of the estuary is much affected by silting, and part of it is marked on modern maps as dry land rather than tidal. The wetlands are of importance to wildlife, and are listed as a Ramsar site.

Most of the conurbation on both sides of the estuary is known as Merseyside. The estuary narrows between Liverpool and Birkenhead, where it is constricted to a width of 0.7 miles (1.1 km), between Albert Dock in Liverpool and the Woodside ferry terminal in Birkenhead. On the Liverpool side, Liverpool Docks stretch for over 7.5 miles (12.1 km), the largest enclosed interconnected dock system in the world. American author Herman Melville compared Liverpool Docks to the pyramids of Egypt and the Great Lakes. The docks were built out into the river bed. The Mersey Docks and Harbour Board used granite from a quarry it owned in Scotland for construction of the quays. Birkenhead grew quickly in the 19th century following the introduction of steamships, the earliest being the wooden paddle steamer Elizabeth in 1815. Docks were developed along with a shipbuilding industry, flour milling and soap manufacture on the river's Cheshire bank.

Seaforth Dock, a freeport on the Liverpool side of the estuary where it meets Liverpool Bay, opened in 1971. The dock deals with around 500,000 containers, over 1.2 million tonnes of oil, over 2.5 million tonnes of grain and animal feed, 452,000 tonnes of wood per year. About 25% of all container traffic between the UK and USA passes through the port making it one of the most successful in the world and known as the "Atlantic Gateway". Liverpool was the first UK port with radar assisted operations.

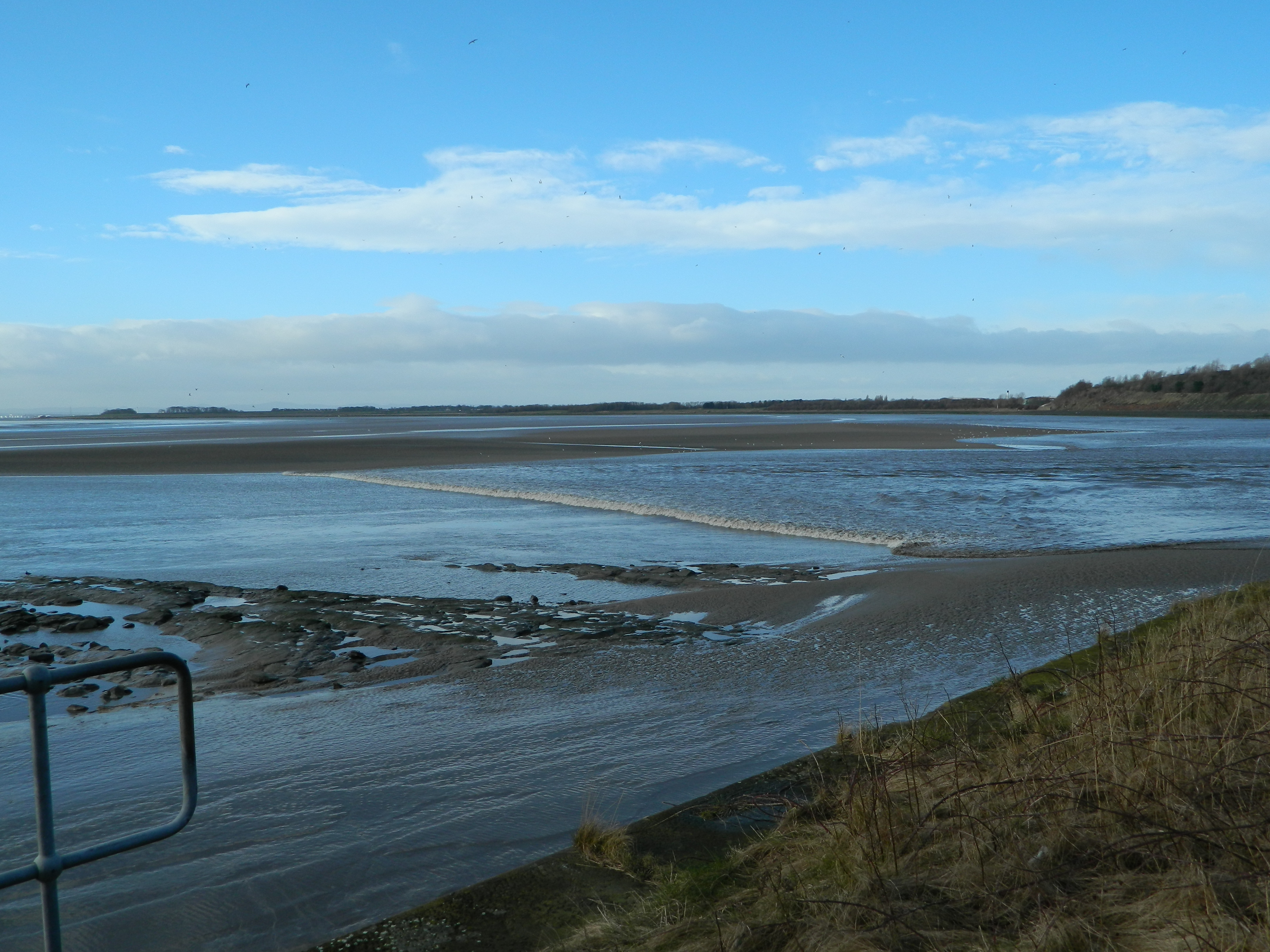
The tidal bore, seen from near the Silver Jubilee Bridge, Widnes

The river empties into Liverpool Bay on the Irish Sea, after a total course of 69 miles (111 km). From 4 metres (13.1 ft) neap tide to 10 metres (32.8 ft) spring tide, the River Mersey has the second highest tidal range in Britain – second only to the River Severn. The narrows in the river estuary between Dingle Point on the Liverpool banks to New Brighton on the Wirral, forces water to flow faster creating a deep channel along the section of river.

For 200 years an admiral was appointed as a conservator to ensure the river remained navigable. Mary Kendrick was the first woman to the post and she had spent years studying a Mersey barrage in the 1980s.

Taylor's Bank is a large sandbank extending out to sea on the north side of the channel entrance to the river, on which many ships have come to grief over the years.

== River crossings ==
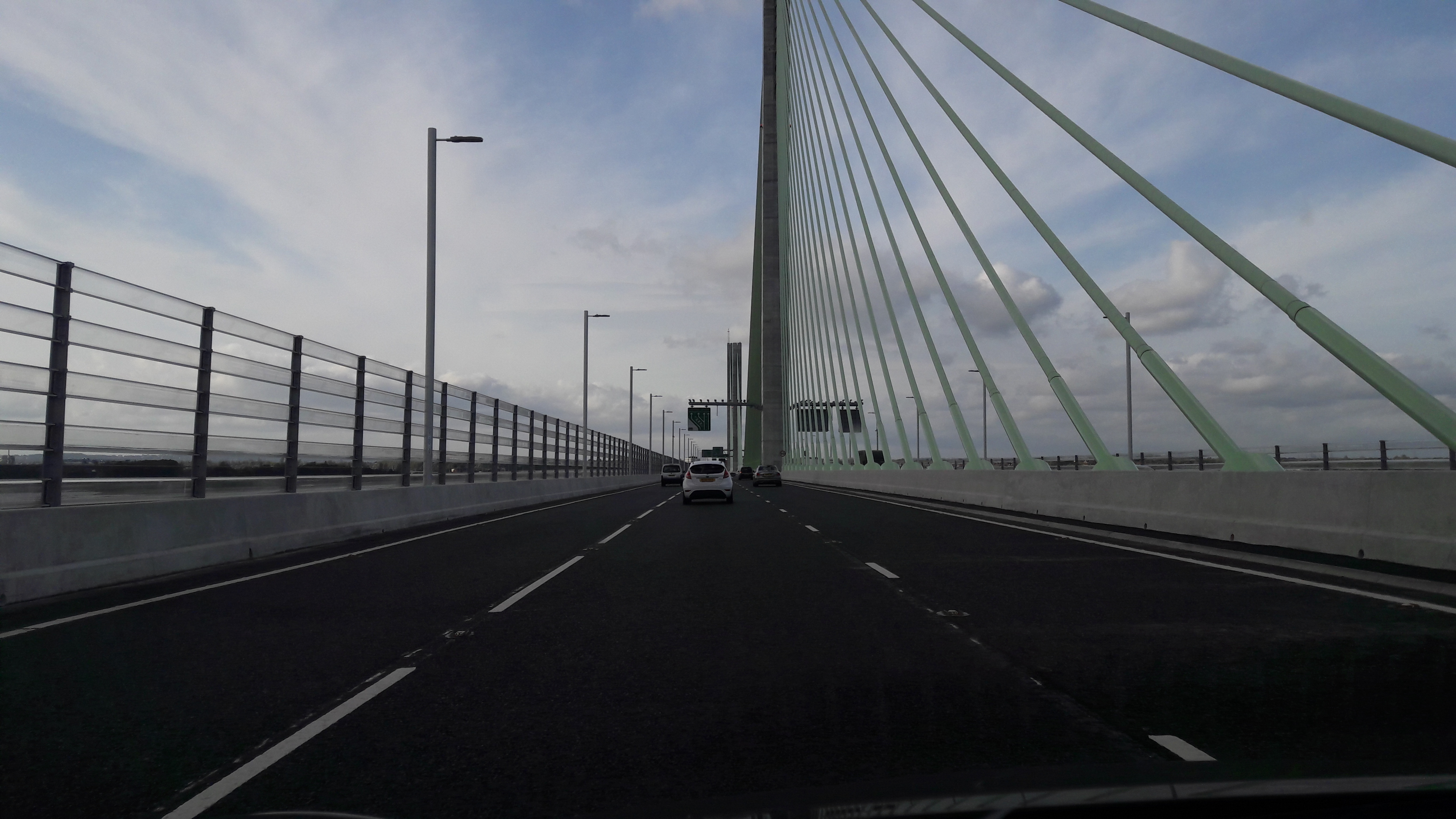
View of the Mersey Gateway bridge

Historically the lowest bridging point on the Mersey was at Warrington where there has been a bridge since medieval times. The first ferry across the estuary was introduced in medieval times by monks from Birkenhead Priory. They transported travellers or accommodated them at the priory in bad weather.

Countless people died on the River Mersey until the advent of safe passage via bridges and tunnels. Many of these deaths were of people who earned their living on the river, either as mariners or dock workers. The majority of mariners to die worked on the Mersey flat boats and drowned due to the weather conditions or poor craft maintenance, although many ordinary civilians perished too. Another ferry existed at Runcorn Gap and by today's safety standards was highly dangerous. Passengers had to traverse wooden planks over the mud flats to reach the ferry boats which themselves were often poorly maintained and leaking. Even the steps down to the river bank were described as "beautifully slippery". In the dark the ferry was particularly worrying as there were few or no lights and the journey was only undertaken on a "needs must" basis. Complaints about the appalling conditions were reported in the local and national press consistently for over 40 years.

In the early 19th century steam operated ferries were introduced. The Mersey Ferry, managed and operated by Merseytravel, operates between Pier Head in Liverpool and Woodside in Birkenhead and Seacombe. It has become a tourist attraction offering cruises that provide an overview of the river and surrounding areas.

The Mersey Railway completed its tunnel through the estuary's underlying Triassic sandstone using manual labour in 1885. Intended as a pneumatic railway, the company opted for steam trains from its opening until it was electrified in 1903. The centre of the running tunnel is between 30 feet (9.1 m) and 70 feet (21.3 m) below the river bed. The railway is now part of the Merseyrail network. Two road tunnels pass under the estuary from Liverpool. By road, the Queensway Tunnel opened in 1934 connecting the city to Birkenhead, and the Kingsway Tunnel, opened in 1971, connects with Wallasey.

Further upstream, the Runcorn Railway Bridge over the river at Runcorn Gap was built in the 1860s for the London and North Western Railway on the mainline between London and Liverpool. It had a cantilevered footway providing an alternative crossing to a ferry. In 1905 the now demolished Widnes-Runcorn Transporter Bridge opened and took cars and passengers via a cable car. The Silver Jubilee Bridge, completed in 1961, is immediately adjacent.

East of Warrington, the M6 motorway crosses the river and the Manchester Ship Canal on the Thelwall Viaduct. When the viaduct opened in 1963, it was the longest motorway bridge in England. A second viaduct alongside opened in 1995; northbound traffic uses the old viaduct and southbound the new.

A new 6-lane bridge, the "Mersey Gateway", between Runcorn and Widnes began its construction phase in May 2014 and opened just after midnight on 14 October 2017. At the same time the Silver Jubilee Bridge was closed to undergo maintenance for approximately 6–12 months, but remained open to pedestrians and cyclists. The new bridge uses tolls and the existing Silver Jubilee Bridge is also tolled open to local traffic.

== Environment ==
Water quality in the Mersey was severely affected by industrialisation, and in 1985, the Mersey Basin Campaign was established to improve water quality and encourage waterside regeneration. In 2002, oxygen levels that could support fish along the entire length were recorded for the first time since industry began on the Mersey.

In 2009 it was announced that the river is "cleaner than at any time since the industrial revolution" and is "now considered one of the cleanest [rivers] in the UK".

=== Sediment pollution ===
Persistent organic and mercury (Hg) pollution contained within sediments of the Mersey estuary have been evaluated by British Geological Survey. Mersey river sediments from outer to inner estuary (Alfred Dock to Widnes) contain a variety of common organic pollutants, including polyaromatic hydrocarbons (PAH) with concentrations which fall in the middle of the range of similarly industrial-urban river-estuaries. The distribution of individual PAH compounds suggests that the Mersey has contaminants mainly derived from combustion sources such as vehicle exhaust as well as coal burning. The distribution of the toxic heavy metal Mercury (Hg) has been assessed by measuring 203 sediments taken from shallow cores (0.4 – 1.6 m) extracted from both the main river and adjacent salt marshes. The average amount of Hg in the Mersey was found to be 2 mg/kg with the highest amounts of 5 mg/kg occurring below the surface at concentrations harmful to sediment dwelling biota. The vertical rise and fall in Hg pollution observed at four Mersey salt marshes indicated a decline in metal pollution since the 1980s.

=== Fauna ===
Salmon have returned to the river and have been seen jumping at Woolston and Howley Weirs between September and November. Salmon parr and smolt have been caught in the Mersey's tributaries, the River Goyt and the River Bollin. Atlantic grey seals from Liverpool Bay occasionally venture into the estuary along with bottlenose dolphin and harbour porpoise. Otter tracks have been observed near Fiddlers Ferry. Other fish in the estuary include cod, whiting, dab, plaice and flounder. Spiny dogfish, mackerel and tope feed on shrimp and whitebait in the estuary. For ducks, the estuary is important to common shelducks and Eurasian teal. Waders include redshank, black-tailed godwit, dunlin, pintail and turnstone.

=== Environmental designations ===
The section of the estuary between Runcorn Railway Bridge and Bromborough, including Hale Duck Decoy and Mount Manisty, is designated as a Site of Special Scientific Interest, the SSSI citation describing it as an "internationally important site for wildfowl". There are further SSSIs at New Ferry and Mersey Narrows. The Mersey Estuary, and the Mersey Narrows and North Wirral Foreshore, are also Ramsar sites.

== Navigation ==
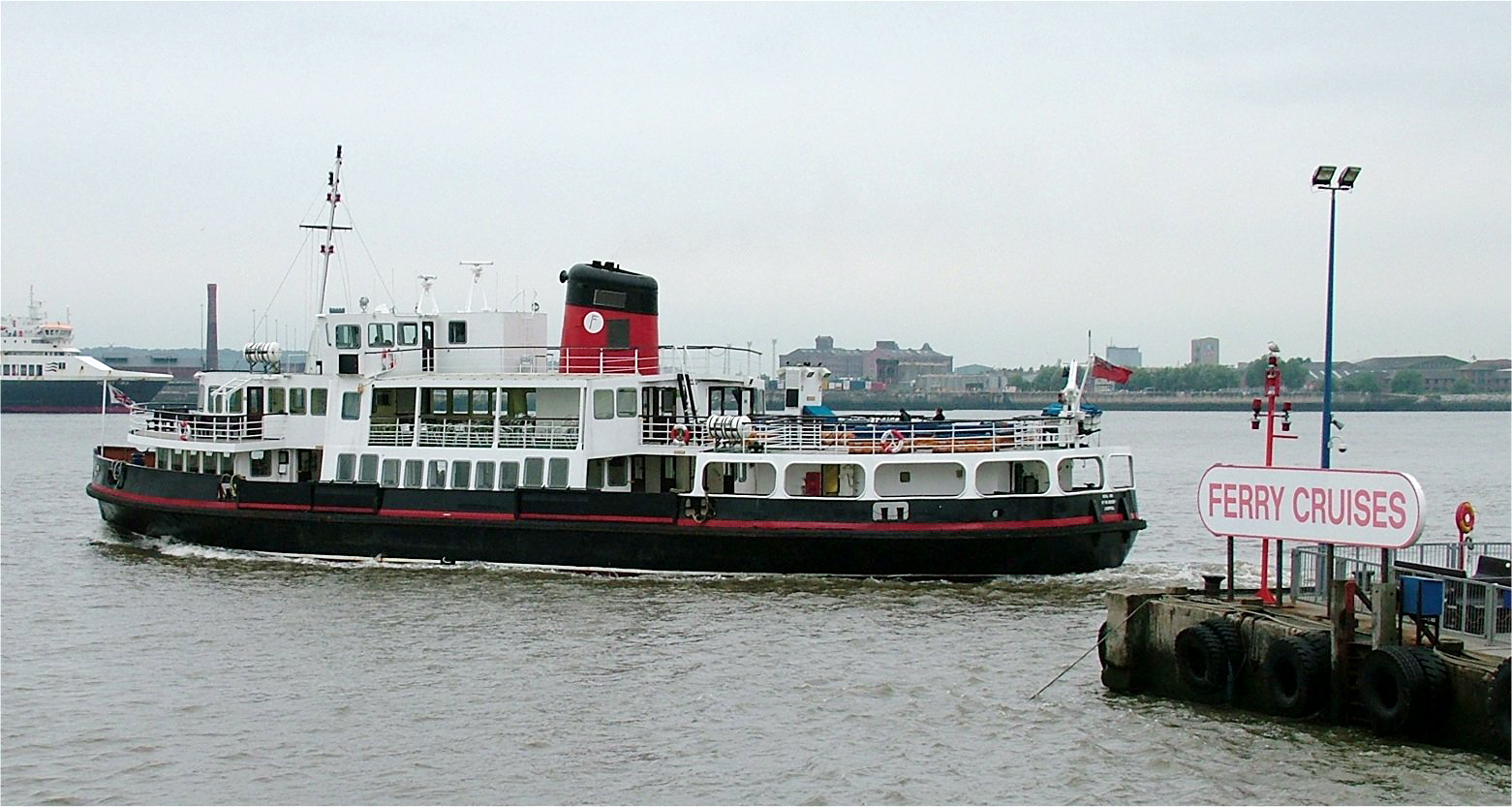
Ferry across the Mersey, June 2005

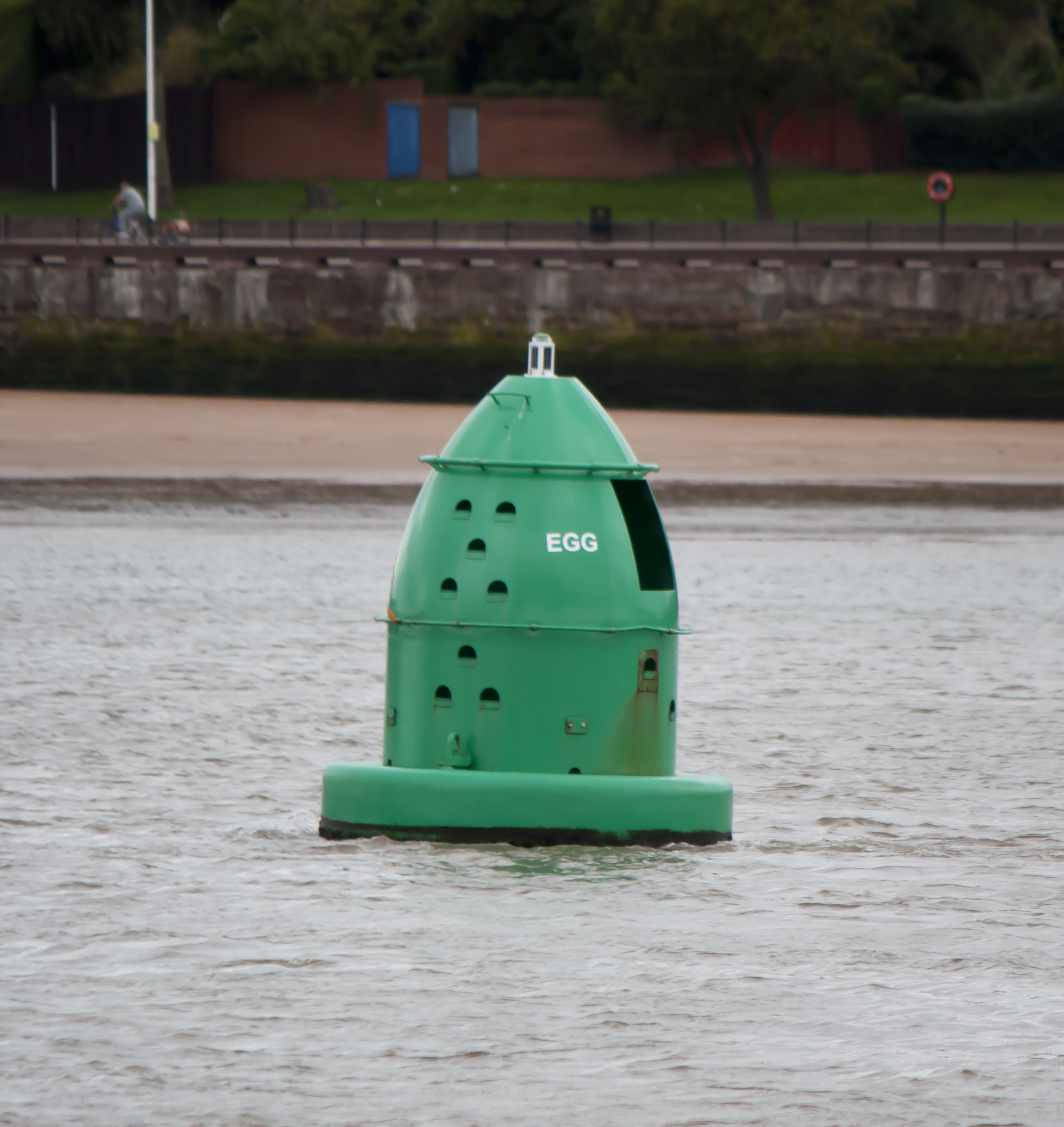
Egg Buoy near Egremont, Wallasey

Capt. William Gill of the Isle of Man Steam Packet Company, charted a safe, navigable channel (the Victoria Channel) through the treacherous uncharted waters of the estuary in 1836.

Since the construction of the Manchester Ship Canal, large commercial vessels do not usually navigate the estuary beyond Garston on the north bank, or the locks into the ship canal at Eastham. Deep-water channels are maintained to both. Until the early 20th century, commercial traffic bound for further upstream carried cargo in large flat-bottomed sailing barges known as Mersey Flats to Howley Wharf in Warrington and (via the Sankey Canal) to St Helens. Motor barges delivered to riverside factories at Warrington until at least the 1970s, but nowadays only pleasure craft and yachts use the upper estuary and the tidal river where a number of sailing clubs are based. On most high tides, seagoing yachts with masts raised can navigate as far upstream as Fiddlers Ferry – about 3.1 mi (5.0 km) downstream of Warrington – where there is a small marina accessed via a river lock. Although river craft can continue upstream to Howley Weir, there are no landing or mooring facilities. Before construction of the ship canal, a lock bypassing Howley Weir allowed navigation further upstream via a straight "cut" avoiding a meander around Woolston.

== Recreation ==
The Mersey Valley Countryside Warden Service manages local nature reserves such as Chorlton Ees and Sale Water Park recreational sites and provides an educational service along the Mersey from Manchester to the Manchester Ship Canal.

It is possible to canoe on parts of the river between Stockport and Carrington. Liverpool Sailing Club located at Garston Coastal Park on the north bank of the estuary has a 1,000-foot (300 m) slipway giving access to river for water sports.

The wooded suburban stretch of the river from above Howley Weir to Woolston is also used for recreational and competitive rowing, operated from the Warrington Rowing Club.

Angling has become popular on some stretches of the river as fish such as perch, barbel, grayling, carp, roach, chub, trout, pike, bream and dace have been caught. Warrington Anglers Association have fishing rights on a large stretch of the river through most of Warrington. Prince Albert Angling Society also have a small stretch near Rixton.

The river has also faced problems regarding the poaching of fish despite a strict 'catch and release' policy imposed on anglers for ecological reasons which applies to most UK waterways.

In December 2025, the Department for Environment, Food and Rural Affairs announced that the Mersey Valley Way would become the first of England's nine new National River Walks. The long‑distance route is intended to follow the River Mersey for approximately 13 miles (21 km) between Stockport, Manchester and Trafford, using upgraded riverside paths to improve public access and wayfinding along the valley.

=== Mersey River Festival ===
The Mersey River Festival, rebranded in 2018 as 'River Festival Liverpool', was an annual event held on the river Mersey during a weekend in May or June between 1981 and 2019 to celebrate Liverpool's maritime tradition. Originally organised by the Merseyside Development Corporation, the festival was later overseen by Liverpool City Council and Culture Liverpool. The last event was planned to take place between the 8 and 10 May 2020, but was cancelled due to COVID. As of 2024, the event has not returned.

During the 1990s the festival was the largest event of its kind in Europe. In the 2010s the event attracted tens of thousands of people and included music stages and other waterside attractions alongside regattas, visiting vessels, and tall ships on the river.

Notable musical artists who have performed at the event include Katie Melua, Shola Ama and Russell Watson. Captain David Hawker was the Mersey River Festival's official artist from the late 1990s until the last event in 2019. The painter attended annually to capture on paper the boats, attractions, visitors, and events as they unfolded.

== Mersey barrage ==
Proposals continue for the construction of the Mersey Barrage, a tidal scheme to generate electricity and create another crossing of the river. Very high spring tides can generate a tidal bore from Hale as far upstream as Warrington. On 7 December 2022, the Liverpool City Region mayor announced cooperation between the City Region and K-water of South Korea, who built and operates the Sihwa Lake Tidal Power Station, in order to construct a similar operation on the River Mersey.

== In popular culture ==
The river gave its name to Merseybeat, developed by bands from Liverpool, notably the Beatles. In 1965 it was the subject of the top-ten hit single "Ferry Cross the Mersey" by Gerry and the Pacemakers, and a musical film of the same name. The Liverpool poets published an anthology of their work, The Mersey Sound, in 1967.

The river's stretch through Manchester is the main theme in the Stone Roses song "Mersey Paradise", included on the B-side of the 12" version of their 1989 hit "She Bangs the Drums", and on their 1992 compilation album Turns into Stone.

The Tall ships' fleet has visited the Mersey on four occasions, first in 1984, then in 1992, 2008 and 2012.

The traditional song "Leaving of Liverpool" mentions the river in its opening line.

== Religious significance ==
The Mersey is considered sacred by British Hindus, and worshipped in a similar way to the River Ganges. Festival of Immersion ceremonies are held annually on the river, in which clay figures representing the Hindu Lord Ganesha, the elephant deity riding a mouse, are submerged in the river from a ferry boat. Followers throw flowers, pictures and coins into the river.

== Tributaries ==
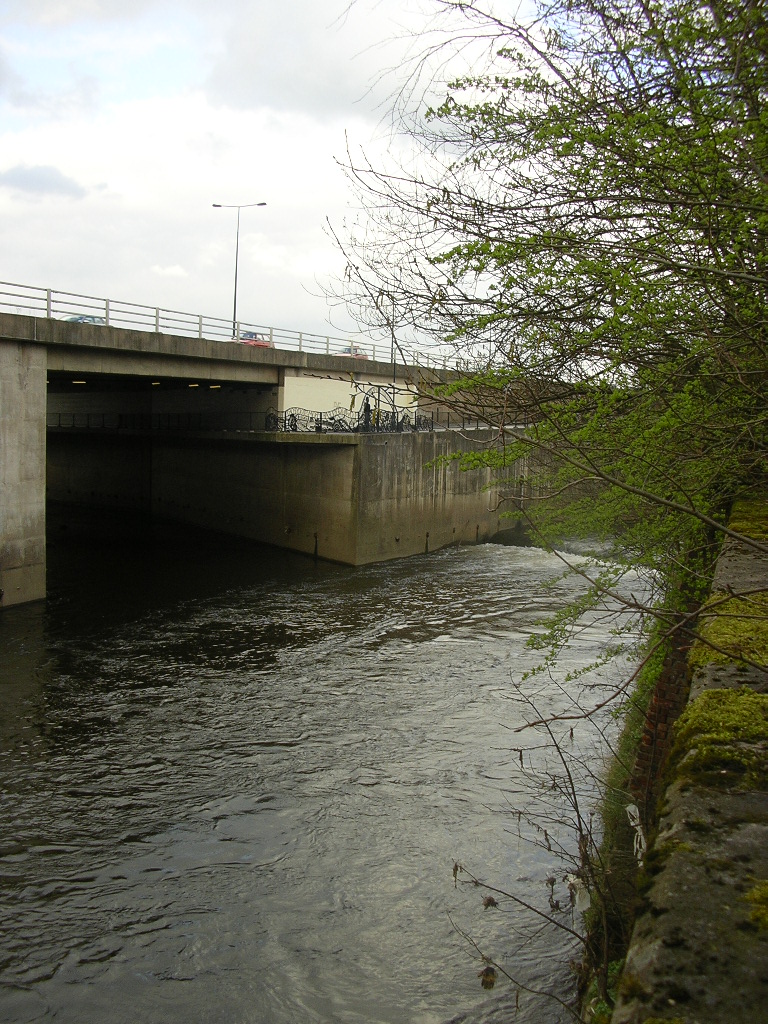
The River Tame (left) and the River Goyt (right) meeting to form the Mersey in Stockport

From its lowest point, moving upstream, confluences and tributaries of the Mersey catchment include:

- The Birket
  - River Fender
    - Prenton Brook
  - Arrowe Brook
    - Greasby Brook
      - Newton Brook
- River Dibbin
  - Clatter Brook
- River Gowy
- Hornsmill Brook
- River Weaver
  - River Dane
    - River Wheelock
    - River Croco
- Ram's Brook
- Bowers Brook
- Sankey Brook
- Padgate Brook
- Morris Brook
- Spittle Brook
- Thelwall Brook
- Fishington Brook
- River Bollin
  - River Dean
- Marsh Brook
- Red Brook
- Glaze Brook/River Glaze
- River Irwell
  - River Medlock
  - River Roch
    - River Beal
    - River Spodden
  - River Irk
  - River Croal
- Old Eea Brook
- Stromford Brook
- Chorlton Brook
- Barrow Brook
- Gatley Brook
- Micker Brook
- Tin Brook
- River Tame
- River Goyt
  - River Etherow
  - River Sett
    - River Kinder

== See also ==
- List of crossings of the River Mersey
