= GM Ringway =

200-mile trail in Greater Manchester, England

- Length: 200 mi (320 km)
- Location: Greater Manchester, England
- Use: Hiking
- Season: All year
- Hazards: Severe weather
- Website: gmringway.org

The GM Ringway is a long-distance walking trail in Greater Manchester, England. It follows a circular route through all 10 of the city-region's boroughs and extends for approximately 200 miles (320 km). The trail is designed around existing footpaths, parks and areas of open-access land, and is divided into 20 stages, each accessible by public transport.

The project is supported by the Greater Manchester Combined Authority, the Ramblers, and CPRE, the countryside charity.

== History ==
In June 2022, the Ramblers and CPRE charities were awarded a £250,000 grant by the National Lottery Heritage Fund to establish the GM Ringway. The grant enabled signposting and an improved app and website to be established. It will also support the organisation of community events across all 10 boroughs of Greater Manchester.

In February 2023, it was reported that Tom Ross, the leader of Trafford Metropolitan Borough Council, was one of the first people to complete the walking trail in its entirety, over the course of around one year.

In July 2023, a pilot scheme was announced, with guided walks through the Trafford section of the GM Ringway, in order to obtain feedback from walkers' experience of the route, as well as on the app and website.

=== Waymarking ===
In December 2023, the Oldham and Bury stages of the route became the first to be signposted by volunteers. By early March 2024, 10 of the 20 stages had been waymarked, covering 115 miles (185 km). The signage consists of small white roundel discs affixed to existing footpath infrastructure, and the GM Ringway roundels are believed to be the first footpath markers in England to incorporate QR codes, allowing walkers to access stage information and digital maps on mobile devices.

Permanent information boards were also installed in 2024 at 10 locations across Greater Manchester, one in each borough. Each board displays the full 200‑mile route along with a detailed map of one of the 20 stages, including public‑transport access points. Sites include Burrs Country Park in Bury, Smithills Hall in Bolton, Hollingworth Lake in Rochdale, Sale Water Park in Trafford and Pennington Flash in Wigan, among others.

== Route ==
The circular route is split into four broad thematic sections:

- The Southern Start-up – from Manchester city centre to the Peak District, following waterways and green spaces
- The Exhilarating East – the hills above Stockport, Tameside and Oldham
- The Noble North – a more challenging section linking the peaks and valleys of the Pennines with Rochdale, Bury and Bolton
- The Western Wind-Down – the wetlands, mosslands and canals of Wigan, Trafford and Salford

Each section highlights contrasting landscapes across Greater Manchester, including river valleys, moorland, historic estates, canals and urban green spaces, with all stages designed to be accessible by public transport. Each section is divided into five stages (20 in total), with the beginning and end of every stage accessible by public transport, usually a train or Metrolink station:

Section	Stage	From	To	Length	Metropolitan Borough(s)
Southern Start-up	1	Manchester	Sale Water Park	6.6 mi (10.6 km)	Manchester, Trafford
Southern Start-up	2	Sale Water Park	East Didsbury	6.6 mi (10.6 km)	Trafford, Manchester
Southern Start-up	3	East Didsbury	Bramhall	7.3 mi (11.7 km)	Manchester, Stockport
Southern Start-up	4	Bramhall	Middlewood	7.9 mi (12.7 km)	Stockport, Cheshire
Southern Start-up	5	Middlewood	Strines	8.2 mi (13.2 km)	Cheshire, Stockport
Exhilarating East	6	Strines	Marple	8.3 mi (13.4 km)	Stockport
Exhilarating East	7	Marple	Broadbottom	8.2 mi (13.2 km)	Stockport, Tameside
Exhilarating East	8	Broadbottom	Greenfield	12.1 mi (19.5 km)	Tameside, Oldham
Exhilarating East	9	Greenfield	Newhey	12.8 mi (20.6 km)	Oldham, Rochdale
Exhilarating East	10	Newhey	Littleborough	11.3 mi (18.2 km)	Rochdale
Noble North	11	Littleborough	Norden	12.3 mi (19.8 km)	Rochdale
Noble North	12	Norden	Bury	12.7 mi (20.4 km)	Rochdale, Bury
Noble North	13	Bury	Bromley Cross	12.6 mi (20.3 km)	Bury, Bolton
Noble North	14	Bromley Cross	Blackrod	12.2 mi (19.6 km)	Bolton
Noble North	15	Blackrod	Wigan	10.1 mi (16.3 km)	Bolton, Wigan
Western Wind-Down	16	Wigan	Leigh	10.1 mi (16.3 km)	Wigan
Western Wind-Down	17	Leigh	Irlam	10.8 mi (17.4 km)	Wigan, Salford
Western Wind-Down	18	Irlam	Altrincham	10.7 mi (17.2 km)	Salford, Trafford
Western Wind-Down	19	Altrincham	Stretford	9.1 mi (14.6 km)	Trafford
Western Wind-Down	20	Stretford	Manchester	8.6 mi (13.8 km)	Trafford, Manchester

The GM Ringway passes more than 40 Grade I and Grade II*-listed buildings across Greater Manchester, including Bramall Hall in Stockport and Haigh Hall in Wigan. There are 14 scheduled monuments including Blackstone Edge Roman Road in Rochdale along the route.

There are also future plans to add link routes from the city centre to the west, north and east to connect with the GM Ringway.

== See also ==
- Capital Ring, a strategic walking route promoted by London's 33 boroughs
- Coventry Way, a 40-mile (64 km) long-distance footpath in central England
- Leeds Country Way, a circular 62-mile (100 km) long-distance footpath around Leeds, West Yorkshire
- London Outer Orbital Path, a 150-mile (240 km) route around the edge of Outer London
- Mersey Valley Way, the first of nine proposed National River Walks
