= Management of the Rhine Basin =

International Commission for the Protection of the Rhine (ICPR) and its contract shows alignment with the UN Convention on international watercourses and has proven effective in its goals for the Rhine and the Rhine Basin. It was necessary for a treaty to come through the countries in the Rhine basin as it provides water based on industrial and agricultural needs and provides drinking water to over 20 million people.

== Management of international waters ==
Water is a resource that when shared between neighboring nations requires negotiation not to prevent conflict, but in order to help conserve it for future use. Studies have shown that dispute over water use does not historically follow a pattern of conflict as much as a pattern of cooperation when negotiations shift from water rights to water needs. A major step towards developing standardized rules for managing waters was the Convention on the Law of the Non-Navigational Uses of International Watercourses, which called for equitable, reasonable, and protective use of waters shared internationally. This requires countries who agreed to these terms to provide a framework for these principles that could be applied to their respective and shared waters.

== Background ==
Located west of central Europe, with an area of 163,609 km^{2} (63,170 sq mi), the basin holds nine countries: Austria, Belgium, France, Germany, Italy, Liechtenstein, Luxembourg, Netherlands, and Switzerland (figure 1). These countries are all involved in the Convention on the Protection of the Rhine (CPR), an agreement that helps to address the issues of the Rhine basin following the UN Convention on watercourses. There have been historical actions that targeted industrial pollution and flooding concerns which the CPR could take on and gain foundation from.

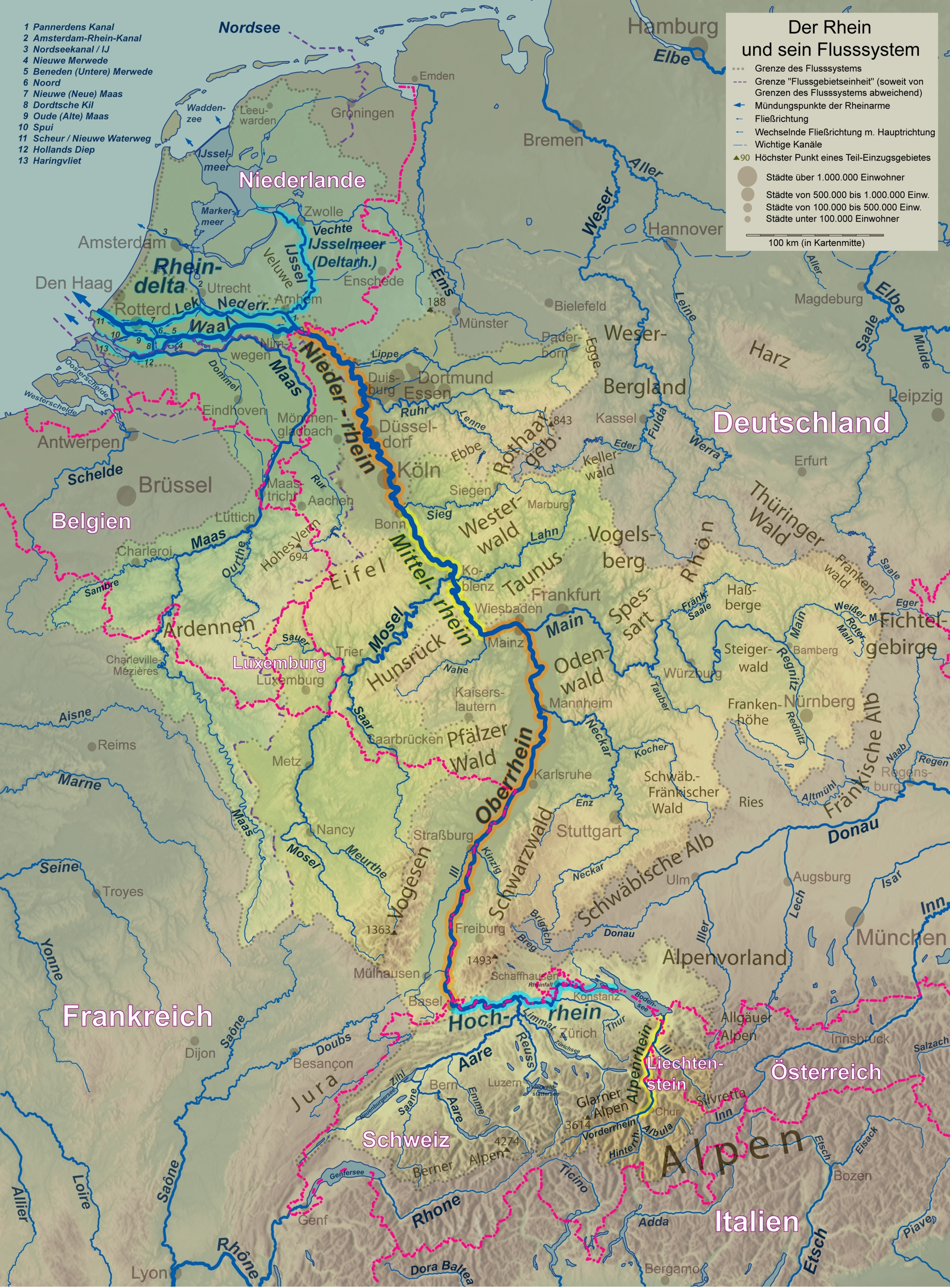
Figure 1: Map of the Rhine basin and major countries that share it

The Rhine Basin holds a population of 48,831,090 people that require water for irrigation, livestock, electricity, manufacturing, domestic, and per Capita use. Total water withdrawals are highest for Germany, Netherlands, and France in that order with 100 percent of their population living in urban city centers. Major hydrological modifications were made to the upper basin to provide flood control, and navigability of the Rhine as well as arable land. There are major industrial sites at various points along the Rhine that pose hazards to the Rhine basin and the ecosystem it holds (figure 2).

== Agreement on the International Commission for the Protection of the Rhine 1963 ==
The modifications to the basin and the existence of industrial sites discharging pollutants culminated in the degradation of ecological value of the basin itself, making the Rhine basin the most polluted it had ever been in the mid 20th century. This spurred the Agreement on the International Commission for the protection of the Rhine against pollution of 1963 which set up the ICPR to address the issue of the basin’s deterioration. The cooperation on the main goal of ecological enhancement was very high as the countries, or furthermore riparians, saw that the quality of their resource was at risk of being lost. The pollution levels did reduce as a result of decreases in factory discharges, and implementation of water treatment plants.

A toxic spill, the Sandoz chemical spill of 1986, upended the work involved to clean the basin and the ICPR were required to integrate more tasks into their plan which provided the framework for the Rhine Action Programme. The existing institutional framework of the ICPR allowed for the additional regulations required for the spill to be incorporated. Improving the Rhine ecosystem and drinking water for future use were already in place, the reduction of river sediment pollution, and rehabilitation of efforts—removal of concrete structures and small dams for better fish migration, removal of contaminated sediment—were added.

Figure 2: inventory of industrial sites in the Rhine circa 1997.

Flood reduction plans and strategies were incorporated into further increasing the ICPR role. This brought into question the ability of the ICPR to address flooding and toxic discharges and upstream and downstream relations all in one. Switzerland and France are the main upstream, Germany is middle, and the Netherlands is the main downstream riparian which proves to be a complex relationship among the countries as to how tasks were to be delegated throughout their own water management infrastructures. What stands above all these adjustments to the ICPR’s plans was that there was cooperation and relative ease in putting the new additions in.

The UN Convention on the Law of the Non-Navigational Uses of International Watercourses in 1997 provided additional framework by which the ICPR could fully realize its goals and in 1998 saw the finalized form of what had been formulating since the 70s which was the Convention on the Protection of the Rhine (CPR). While the restoration projects from 1963 and the Rhine Action Programme were in place, there was already a convention to protect to Rhine that had been revised from initial protection from chemical pollution in the 70s to encompass all that the riparian and those involved in the commission had witnessed throughout the 20th century (e.g. habitat restoration, flood control). Again, the ICPR had historical strategy and cooperation to build off of and finalize the CPR.

== Alignment of the ICPR with the UN Convention on international watercourses ==
Any sense of equitable and reasonable utilization is found subtly throughout the CPR as parties involved must follow overarching statements that contract them to “ensure the use of the Rhine water for drinking purposes,” (CPR 1998, Art. 3) and to “...reinforce their co-operation and mutually inform one another of measure carried out on their territories aimed at protecting the Rhine” (CPR 1998, Art. 5). There is no explicit requiring of equitable and reasonable utilization, but given the past cooperation on the ecological recovery of the Rhine, this goes without explicitly saying. There has been uncertainty with upstream-downstream relations in this regard however. Netherlands' stakeholders in the past have believed that upstream parties must take on more adaptive measures for battling transboundary incidences flowing downstream. Again, the cooperation of upstream parties seems to answer this as their past agreements including other international relations outside of water resource co-management have made it so they are obliged to work towards a better end.

The CPR is also effective in notification, consultation and negotiation. These actions and certain obligations in the CPR help to address and keep the cooperation seen throughout the Rhine Basin. If there are any chances of accidents or spills in the future, other parties must be informed of it and if discharges are necessary, consent must be allowed (CPR, 1997, Art. 5). Article 14 requires cooperation with “external” experts and organizations that can provide consulting and information that can help enhance the goals of the CPR. An example of this is the ICPR has created a model with help from local universities that estimates accidental spill outcomes and help them fit the right measure to avert or mitigate them.

The ICPR has proven their ability to cooperation and exchange information from the 60s, to the Rhine Action Programme, and through to the 1998 CPR. Even with higher government (i.e. European Parliament and Council) adopting the 2000 Water framework Directive, a collection of targets and principles that further protect all European river districts bringing them to a good status, the CPR and commission already fit into this (ICPR 2018, European Water Framework Directive, para. 1). Further evidence of channeling the UN conventions principle of cooperation is their dispute section. If any disputes arises, the commission can settle among themselves, or if incapable of coming to a solution, they can go to the International Court of Justice and appoint a third party to help in the process (CPR, 1997, Annex, Arbitration).

The uncertainty about the CPR falling short will only unfold with time. Climate change is a concern as increasing risk of flooding during rainy months and issues of allocating water during dry summer months begin to appear more often. As mentioned before, Netherland is a downstream party and has been vocal about being open any flooding and release of fertilizers from farms along the Rhine rivers, bringing up the upstream-downstream issue. Fortunately, the Rhine sits right next to the Elbe Basin, which makes Germany the downstream party to the Czech Republic. This relationship provides Germany with experience in dealing with these issues which can be applied to its relationship with Netherland. The International Commission for the Protection of the Elbe is modeled after the ICPR framework, strives for the same goals as the ICPR, and incorporates the 2000 Water Framework Directive that the ICPR took on. From this experience, Germany has an understanding of being a downstream party and has been able to provide solutions and consent when Netherland and other riparians needed it.

The ICPR’s ability to adapt to a variety of challenges over the years, to add more to their list of tasks, and make the most reasonable and equitable decisions for the Rhine Basin is most likely why the Rhine Basin has overall low relative risk as reported by the Transboundary Waters Assessment programme. This has been a build up from the CPRs past cooperation in the mid 20th century, to their ecological efforts to restore the Rhine in the 1980s and 1990s. The Convention on the Protection for the Rhine demonstrates the ability of several countries holding millions of people to align their water needs with the UN Convention on the Law of the Non-Navigational Uses of International Watercourses and with world goals.
