= Listed buildings in Sale, Greater Manchester =

Sale is a town in the Metropolitan Borough of Trafford, Greater Manchester, England. The town and its adjacent area of Ashton upon Mersey contain 27 listed buildings that are recorded in the National Heritage List for England. Of these, two are listed at Grade II*, the middle grade, and the others are at Grade II, the lowest grade. With the arrival of the railway in 1849, the town became a commuter area for Manchester. It contains a variety of listed buildings, which include houses, farmhouses, churches and associated structures, the railway station, public houses, a bank, a cinema, a footbridge, and three war memorials.

== Key ==
Grade	Criteria
II*	Particularly important buildings of more than special interest
II	Buildings of national importance and special interest

== Buildings ==
Name and location	Photograph	Date	Notes	Grade
118 and 129 Cross Street; 53.42885°N 2.32132°W	—	Late 17th century	Originally a farmhouse, it is in brick on a stone plinth, with stone dressings, quoins, and a stone-slate roof. There are two storeys, two bays, and a rear wing. The doorway and the ground floor windows have basket-arched hood moulds and relieving arches, and the windows also have a dog-tooth band. The doorway has a moulded surround. The ground floor windows and one of the upper floor windows are casements, and the other is a sash window.	II
Barracks Farmhouse and Cottage; 53.43074°N 2.35298°W	—	1714	A farmhouse, later extended and converted into two cottages. It is in brick with a slate roof, two storeys, four bays, and lean-tos at the right and the rear. On the front is a trellis porch with a datestone above, and the windows are casements. Inside is an inglenook and a bressumer.	II
St Martin's Church; 53.43325°N 2.34407°W		1714	The baptistry was added in 1874, and the tower by George Truefitt in 1877. It is built in timber framing and in stone, and has a roof of slate and clay tiles. The church consists of a nave, a south porch, a north baptistry, a chancel with a north organ chamber and a south vestry, and a south tower.The tower has a projecting plinth, casement windows, a datestone, a timber framed clock stage with a clock face, gables on each side with bargeboards, and an elaborate weathervane. The baptistry is octagonal with a pyramidal roof, and the windows along the sides are mullioned with semicircular heads.	II*
Sundial; 53.43315°N 2.34395°W	—	18th century	The sundial is in the churchyard of St Martin's Church. It is in stone, and consists of a baluster-like shaft with a decorative band, on a circular base. On the top is a copper dial and gnomon.	II
Moss Cottage; 53.42372°N 2.34219°W	—	Late 18th century	Originally two houses, later combined into one, it is in rendered brick, with a stone extension to the right, a dentilled eaves cornice, and a tiled roof. There are two storeys, a double-depth plan, and two bays. The central doorway has an architrave and a pediment, the windows are sashes, and above the door is a blank window.	II
Ashton New Hall; 53.43263°N 2.34370°W	—	1804	Originally one house, later divided into two, it is in brick on a stone plinth, with a modillion eaves cornice, and a slate roof. There are two storeys, five bays, a double-depth plan, and a porch on each gable end. The central doorway has ¾ columns, a fanlight with radial bars, and an open pediment. The windows are sashes with stone sills and brick cambered arches, and there is an arched stair window in the left gable.	II
Jackson's Bridge; 53.43020°N 2.28676°W		1811	A footbridge crossing the River Mersey, it is in wrought iron. The bridge consists of a single span, with cast iron piers, timber decking, and is approached by wrought iron ramps.	II
Marsh Farm; 53.42961°N 2.34624°W	—	Early 19th century	A farmhouse, later a private house, in brick with a plain eaves cornice, and a slate roof. There are two storeys, a double-depth plan, two bays, and a small rear wing. The central doorway has a round-arched head and a fanlight, and the windows are sashes with stone sills and cambered brick arches.	II
St Anne's Church; 53.42089°N 2.30955°W		1854	The church was extended on three occasions later in the 19th century, and the baptistry was added in 1960. The church is stone and has a slate roof with coped gables. It consists of a nave, north and south aisles with separate roofs, north and south transepts, a chancel with vestries and an organ chamber, and a northwest steeple. The steeple has a two-stage tower with diagonal buttresses, an embattled parapet with corner pinnacles, and a spire with lucarnes and a weathercock. The baptistry is semi-octagonal and has crocketed pinnacles.	II
Brooklands station 53.41727°N 2.32563°W		1859	A railway station for the Manchester, South Junction and Altrincham Railway, the booking hall is in red brick with blue brick dressings, a cornice band, a timber fascia, and a hipped slate roof. The entrance from the street has one storey, three bays, a central doorway and flanking windows, all with round heads. At the rear are two storeys, and steps lead down to the platform. There are brick buildings on both platforms, and on the Manchester platform is also a canopy.	II
St John's Church; 53.40925°N 2.31870°W		1864–1868	The church was designed by Alfred Waterhouse in Gothic style. It is in sandstone with a red tiled roof, and consists of a nave, a north porch, double north and south transepts, and a chancel with a north vestry. At the west end are square corner pinnacles and a six-light window, and at the east end is a rose window, under which is a niche containing an eagle.	II*
Cemetery chapels 53.41882°N 2.32642°W		c. 1865	The chapels are in sandstone and have Welsh slate roofs with coped gables with cross finials. They have an H-shaped plan, with a central steeple over an archway and the chapels as cross-wings. The steeple has a two-stage tower with stepped buttresses, and an octagonal spire with lucarnes and a finial. The chapels have gabled porches and lancet windows.	II
St Mary Magdalene's Church; 53.42353°N 2.34013°W		1872–1874	The church is in stone, it has a tile roof with coped gables and finials, and is in Decorated style. The church consists of a nave, a south porch, north and south transepts, a chancel with an organ chamber, and a southeast steeple. The steeple has a three-stage tower with diagonal buttresses, an octagonal corner stair turret, octagonal pinnacles, and a spire with gabled lucarnes and a weathercock. The windows contain Geometrical tracery, and the east window has five lights.	II
St Martin's School and The Old School House; 53.42881°N 2.34157°W		1874	A school and schoolmaster's house, with the tower added in 1877. They are in brick with stone dressings and slate roofs. The school has an L-shaped plan with sides of seven and four bays, and a single storey. It has a projecting plinth, a sill band, a decorative eaves band in applied timber, coped gables, and mullioned windows. At the corner is a tower with quoins and bands, an open belfry, clock faces, a pyramidal roof, and a weathervane. The house has three bays, a decorative porch, a dormer, and crested roof tiles.	II
Trinity House; 53.42064°N 2.30720°W		1875	Originally a Methodist church, later used for other purposes, it is in stone with a slate roof, and is in Classical style. There are two storeys, an entrance front of five bays, and seven bays along the sides. On the front is a full-height portico with two Ionic columns and two square columns, all in pink stone, carrying an entablature. The front has a rusticated plinth, giant corner pilasters, a dentilled cornice, and at the top is a three-bay dentilled pediment containing a cross in the tympanum. In the outer bays are windows with architraves, flat-headed on the ground floor, round-headed on the upper floor, and with decorative panels between them.	II
The Sale; 53.41752°N 2.31131°W		1878	A hotel, later a public house, in brick with some stone dressings and a slate roof with lead finials. There is a main range with two storeys, a tower wing to the left, and a lower later extension to the right. In the centre is an entrance, above which is a large mullioned stair window; the other windows are casements. The left bay is canted with an attic above an embattled parapet, to the left is a single-storey entrance porch, partly half timbered. Behind this is a tall octagonal tower with narrow windows, and at the top is a continuous window under an octagonal roof.	II
Dovecote; 53.42758°N 2.29137°W		c. 1880	The dovecote is the only surviving structure associated with Sale Old Hall. It is in brick with stone dressings, a moulded eaves cornice, and a conical Westmorland slate roof. The dovecote has an octagonal plan and two stages. In the lower stage are two doorways with elaborately moulded pointed arches and four lancet windows. The upper stage is corbelled out, it is circular, and contains four gabled bird entries.	II
St Paul's Church; 53.42265°N 2.32204°W		1883–84	The tower was added in 1911. The church is in stone and has slate roofs with coped gables, corner pinnacles, and cross finials. It consists of a nave with a clerestory, north and south aisles, a north porch, a chancel with a vestry, an organ chamber, and a polygonal apse, and a southwest tower. The tower has four stages, an arched doorway, angle buttresses with gablets, a niche for a statue, clock faces, an embattled parapet with pinnacles, and a pyramidal roof with a spike and a weathercock.	II
Brooks' Institute; 53.42844°N 2.34182°W	—	1887	A hall designed by George Truefitt, it has a brick plinth, decorative timber framing above, and a clay tile roof. There is one storey, and an L-shaped plan. On the left is a gabled wing with a six-light mullioned window, a tile-hung gable, and a finial. In the right wing is a doorway with a datestone above and a hipped roof.	II
Lychgate, St Martin's Church; 53.43311°N 2.34369°W		1887	The lychgate, designed by George Truefitt, is at the entrance to the churchyard. It has a brick plinth a timber frame, and a pyramidal clay tile roof. On the sides are large semicircular timber arches, and the gates are in cast iron.	II
The Volunteer Hotel; 53.42846°N 2.32227°W		1897	A public house in red brick with applied timber framing and some render, and a roof of slate and tile. It is in neo-Jacobean style, and has two storeys, attics and a basement, and five bays, three of which are gabled with decorative bargeboards. In the second bay is a tower with a lantern and a lead dome. The doorway in the fourth bay has marble fluted pilasters, Composite capitals, ball finials and a triangular pediment. Also on the front are canted and rectangular bay windows.	II
Arden Hall; 53.41464°N 2.32331°W		c. 1898	A large house in brick with detailing in render and timber framing, a moulded eaves cornice, and a tile roof. It has an irregular plan, two storeys with attics, and a front of three bays. The central bay contains a doorway above which is an arcaded verandah with a balustrade, and on the roof is a gabled dormer. The outer bays project forward and are gabled. The left bay has a two-storey flat-faced bow window with pargeting between the floors, and the right bay has a single-storey canted bay window, and an oriel window above.	II
Lloyd's Bank; 53.42497°N 2.32045°W		1902	The former bank, by Thomas Worthington and Son, is on a corner site, and has two storeys with attics, and sides of three bays. The ground floor is in rusticated stone, above is brick with stone dressings, and the roof is in green slate. The two-storey porch has an arched doorway with ¾ columns, a mullioned and transomed window, and a coped gable with a ball finial. On the ground floor are pilasters and windows with semi-elliptical heads, and on the upper floor are oriel windows and cartouches.	II
War memorial, St Anne's Church; 53.42093°N 2.30934°W		1920	The war memorial is in the churchyard of St Anne's Church. It is in Aberdeen granite, and consists of a cross about 4 metres (13 ft) high. A laurel wreath is hung on the cross, which is decorated with palm leaves. The cross is on an octagonal plinth on an octagonal two-stepped base. At the foot of the shaft of the cross are four scrolled feet, and on the sides of the plinth are panels with inscriptions and the names of those lost in the First World War.	II
Ashton-upon-Mersey war memorial 53.43308°N 2.34488°W		1923	The war memorial is in the churchyard of St Martin's Church. It is in sandstone, and consists of a cross with a tapered shaft, on a stepped plinth, on a two-stepped base. In the centre of the cross arms is the carving of a crown with a smaller cross inside. On the front of the plinth is a bronze wreath, and inscriptions relating to both World Wars.	II
Sale war memorial 53.42481°N 2.31967°W		1925	The war memorial consists of a statue in Portland stone of St George with a sword and a shield. It stands on a base of polished granite with a pedestal, a tall square shaft with a projecting base, and a small stylobate. On the pedestal are bay leaf wreaths and coats of arms, and on the shaft are bronze plaques containing the names of those lost in the war.	II
Tatton Cinema; 53.42519°N 2.32621°W		1933	The former cinema is in brick, partly rendered, it has a hipped Welsh slate roof with a tiled ridge, and is in Neo-Egyptian style. The front is flanked by full-height pylons containing shop windows in the lower part, and narrow windows with projecting cornices above. Over the entrance are four columns with lotus capitals.	II
