= St Martin's Church, Ashton upon Mersey =

Coordinates: 53.4332°N 2.3440°W

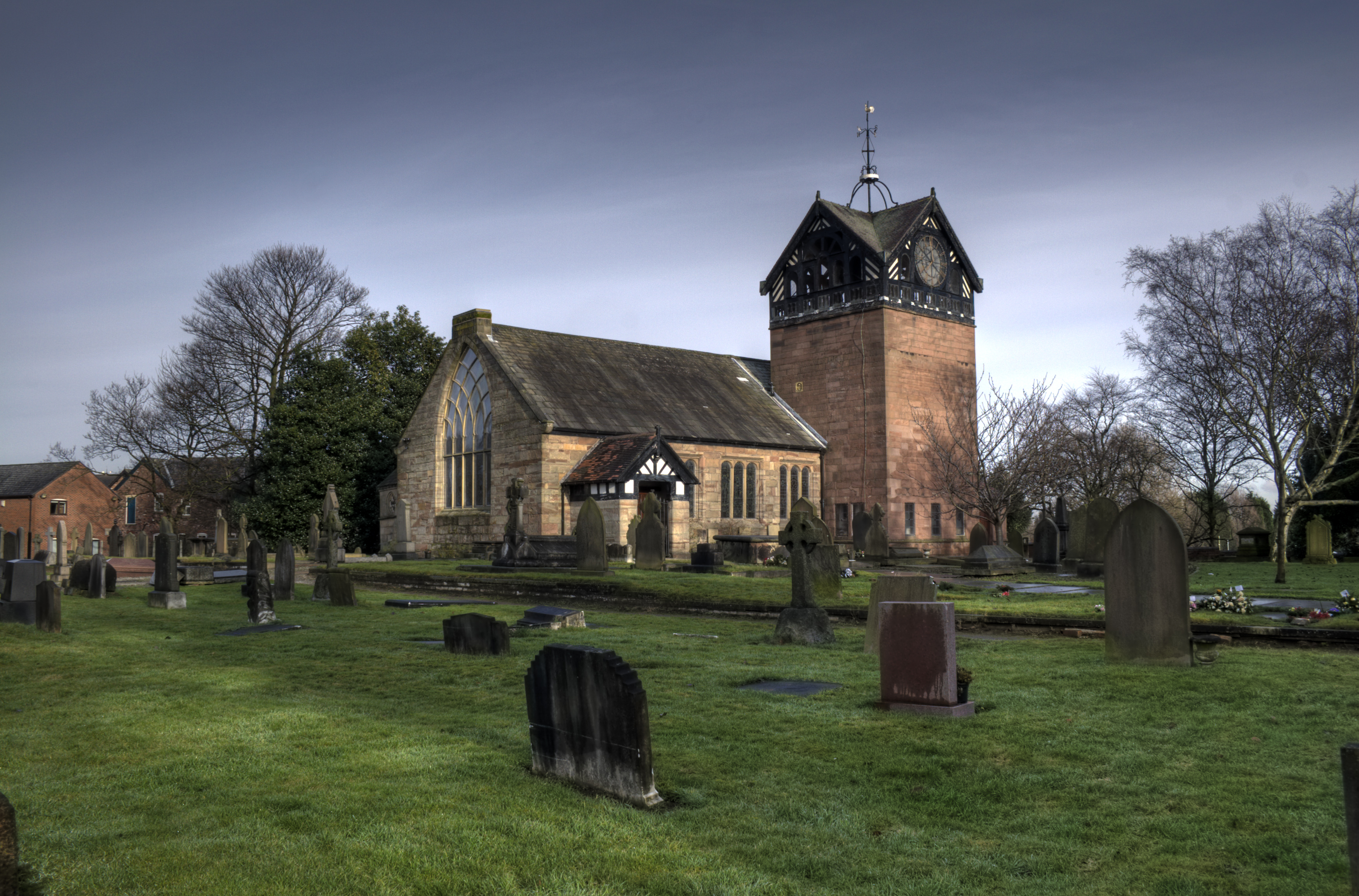
- St Martin's Church, Ashton upon Mersey, from the southwest

- Location in Greater Manchester
- OS grid reference: SJ 773 930
- Location: Church Lane, Ashton upon Mersey, Sale, Greater Manchester
- Country: England
- Denomination: Anglican
- Website: St Martin, Ashton upon Mersey

History
- Status: Parish church

Architecture
- Functional status: Active
- Heritage designation: Grade II*
- Designated: 11 November 1966
- Architect(s): W. H. Brakspear, George Truefitt
- Architectural type: Church
- Completed: 1887

Specifications
- Materials: Lymm sandstone Slate and tile roofs Timber-framed top stage to tower

Administration
- Province: York
- Diocese: Chester
- Archdeaconry: Macclesfield
- Deanery: Bowdon
- Parish: Ashton upon Mersey

St Martin's Church is in Church Lane, Ashton upon Mersey, a district of Sale, Greater Manchester, England. It is recorded in the National Heritage List for England as a designated Grade II* listed building. It is an active Anglican parish church in the diocese of Chester, the archdeaconry of Macclesfield and the deanery of Bowdon.

== History ==
The first church, probably timber-framed, was built in 1304 on the site of an old Saxon burial place. In 1704 it was destroyed by a storm. A new church was built in 1714 for Joshua Allen. In 1874 a baptistry by W. H. Brakspear was added. In 1886, the turret and clock were removed and the following year a new tower was built, it was designed by George Truefitt for Sir Williams Cunliffe Brooks. In the same year a ring of 13 bells was installed and a new lych gate was built.

== Architecture ==
=== Exterior ===
The church is built in Lymm sandstone with slate and tile roofs. Its plan consists of a wide nave of four bays, a south porch, a north baptistery, and a chancel with an adjoining tower containing a vestry to the south. The tower is square, its top stage being timber-framed. It contains a clock face to the south, gables on each side and an elaborate weather vane. The baptistry is octagonal with a pyramidal roof.

=== Interior ===
At the west end is a gallery. The roof is double hammer beam in type. The chancel walls are panelled with the ends of former box pews. One font dating from the 16th century on a 20th-century shaft is wrongly dated 1304. Another font dates from the 18th century. The parish chest is long and narrow, and is dated 1706. On the walls are a number of memorial tablets. The parish registers date from 1631 but are not complete and are in part difficult to decipher. The stained glass in the east window was given in 1862 by James Occleston.

== External features ==
In the churchyard is a sundial dating from the early 19th century in stone with a copper dial and gnomon. It is listed at Grade II. Also listed at Grade II is the lych gate dated 1887 designed by George Truefitt. It is timber-framed with a pyramidal clay tile roof on a brick plinth. Two sides have large semicircular arches; the other two sides are vertically studded. All sides have pierced roundel bands just below the eaves. The gates are cast iron. The churchyard contains the war graves of 16 service personnel, eight of World War I and eight of World War II.

== See also ==
- List of churches in Greater Manchester
- Grade II* listed buildings in Greater Manchester
- Listed buildings in Sale, Greater Manchester
