= The Volunteer, Sale =

Listed pub in Greater Manchester, England

The Volunteer
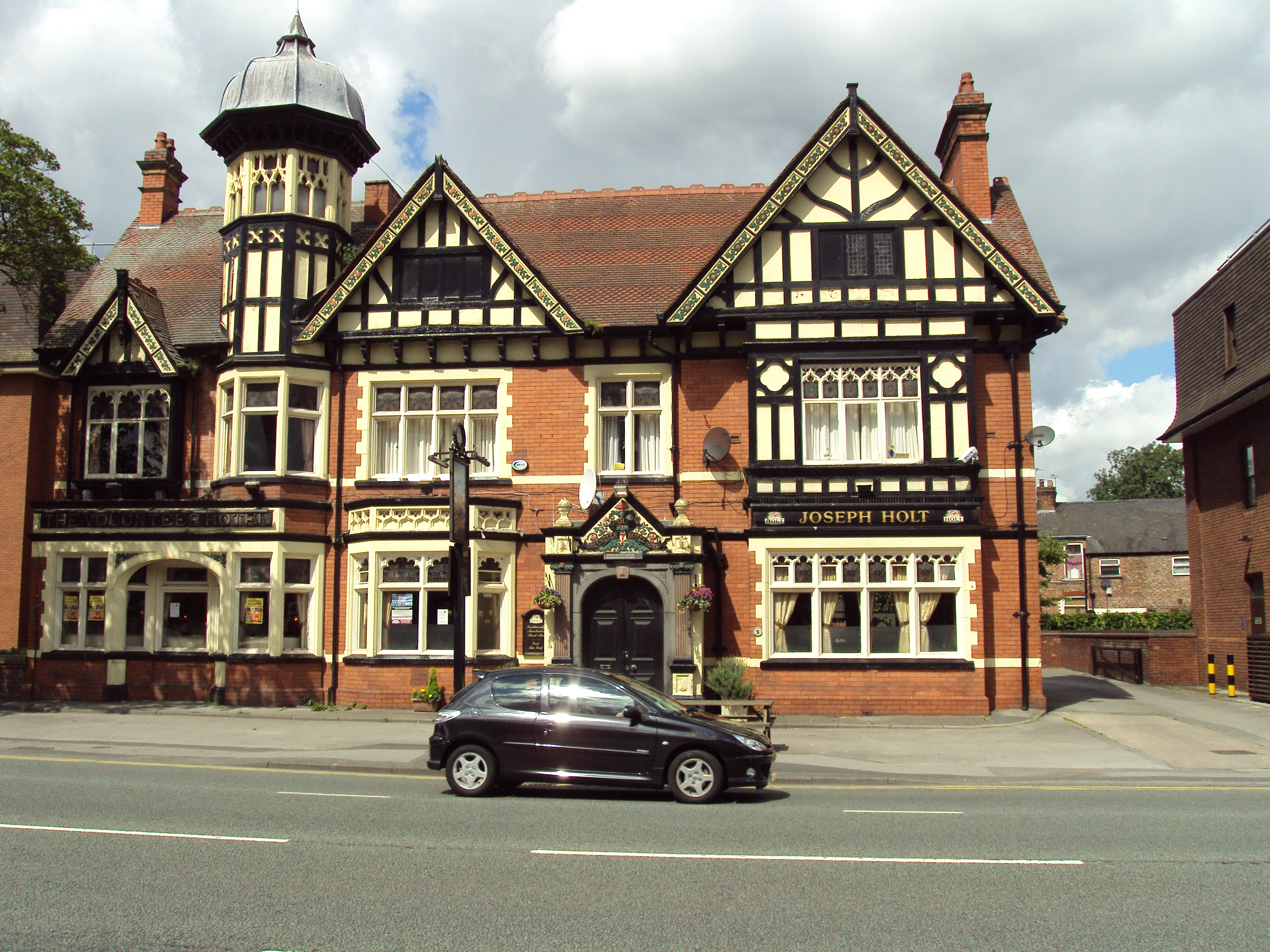
- The pub in 2009

- Location within Greater Manchester
- Alternative names: Volunteer Hotel

General information
- Type: Public house
- Architectural style: Jacobethan
- Location: 81 Cross Street, Sale, Greater Manchester, England
- Coordinates: 53.4285°N 2.3223°W
- Year built: 1897; 129 years ago
- Opening: 1898; 128 years ago
- Renovated: 2012 (refurbished)
- Client: Chesters Brewery
- Owner: Joseph Holt's

Design and construction
- Architect: James Diggle Mould
- Designations

Listed Building – Grade II
- Official name: The Volunteer Hotel
- Designated: 8 February 2012
- Reference no.: 1401662

Website
- Official website

The Volunteer is a Grade II listed public house on Cross Street in Sale, a town within Trafford, Greater Manchester, England. Built in 1897 as the Volunteer Hotel for Chesters Brewery, it replaced an earlier pub on the same site whose name had changed from The White Lion to The Volunteer in the early 19th century. The building has remained in use as a pub since opening, with 20th-century alterations to the interior and the end of its hotel accommodation. It is now owned by Joseph Holt's Brewery.

== History ==
The building was constructed in 1897 as the Volunteer Hotel, according to its official listing, and opened in 1898. It was designed by James Diggle Mould for Chesters Brewery. It replaced an older public house and a neighbouring cottage. That earlier pub had changed its name from The White Lion to The Volunteer in the early 19th century, a name generally linked to a local volunteer defence unit raised in 1803 during the fears of a French invasion.

The 1910 and 1947 Ordnance Survey maps mark the building as a public house with no attributed name. In 1949 part of the scullery was proposed for conversion into urinals. Further plans were put forward in 1954 for internal changes to add a ladies' toilet, create a new service bar and use the old snug as accommodation. Later in the 20th century the ground floor was reworked to give the public areas a more open layout, and the original bar was replaced. These changes were probably made around the time the hotel rooms ceased to be used, although most of the upper floor remained private living space. One of the original entrances was also closed off during this period.

On 8 February 2012, the Volunteer Hotel was designated a Grade II listed building. A refurbishment carried out that year drew attention to its historic exterior. As of 2025, the pub's freehold is owned by Joseph Holt's Brewery.

== Architecture ==
=== Exterior ===
The building is constructed of red brick with areas of timber framing and render, and has a tiled and slated roof topped by a small lead dome. Its plan is irregular, with a main front range facing south‑east and further sections to the rear.

It has two storeys with an attic and basement, and is designed in a Jacobethan style. The front has five bays marked by gables that increase in size, each with decorative timberwork and carved motifs. A small tower with pointed windows and a domed top rises above the second bay. The fourth bay contains a stone porch with marble columns, carved capitals, ball finials and a shaped pediment showing the building's name and date; the original doors remain. A former side entrance under a shallow arch has been altered to form a window.

The windows vary in form, including canted and flat bays and multi‑paned casements, many with surviving stained glass. The roof has patterned tile bands to the front and south sides, with mixed slates at the rear, and tall brick chimneys. The north and south elevations of the front range are mostly plain apart from decorative gables and a corbelled chimney. The rear range has a rendered upper floor with timber framing, and the back of the building is simpler with smaller gables. Most windows, a mix of sashes and casements with stained‑glass upper panes, are original.

=== Interior ===
The ground floor is mostly open, with the ceiling showing where earlier walls stood. The porch has painted‑over decorative tiling, and a later bar stands in the centre. Mosaic survives at the cellar entrance. The original staircase remains behind the bar, with its main features intact though painted.

The upstairs south room, originally the billiard room, retains full‑height panelling, a painted frieze, a patterned plaster ceiling around a stained‑glass lightwell and an ornate fireplace. The north side forms the present private accommodation, formerly bedrooms and stores, now separated from the landing by a later partition. Two large rooms are divided by a panelled screen set within an arched opening with pilasters.

The attic contains numerous small rooms, likely former staff and cheaper hotel bedrooms, with anaglypta to dado height and mostly lost fireplaces. A raised doorway leads to the tower stair. The cellars are extensive and appear to incorporate parts of the earlier pub, including a barrel drop, west exits and a blocked stair.

== See also ==
- Listed buildings in Sale, Greater Manchester
- Listed pubs in Greater Manchester
