= Sale High School =

Location
- Norris Road; Sale; Trafford, Greater Manchester, M33 3JR; 53.4138°N 2.3046°W

Information
- Type: Foundation school
- Local authority: Trafford Council
- Department for Education URN: 106375 Tables
- Ofsted: Reports
- Headteacher: Adam Rogers
- Gender: Coeducational
- Age: 11 to 16
- Enrolment: 1 008 as of June 2022
- Capacity: 1145
- Colour: Blue
- Website: http://www.salehighschool.co.uk

Sale High School (formerly known as Jeff Joseph Sale Moor Technology College and Sale Secondary School) is a secondary school in Sale Moor, Greater Manchester, England. Its current headteacher is Adam Rogers, and in 2011, the school was awarded the Good Schools Guide Art & Design Award for the highest points score for girls, taking double award GCSE over 2008, 2009, and 2025 in all English schools.

In October 2025, the school became part of the United Learning trust.

== School logo ==
The school's logo includes a representation of the dovecote, which was part of the buildings of Sale Old Hall and is now in Walkden Gardens, and a moor-cock, a play on Sale Moor and previously used on the Urban District Council logo.

== Educational offerings ==
The school offers a wide range of subjects including GCSEs and vocational subjects. It maintains a strong system of pastoral support and support for students with special educational needs. Its 2009 Ofsted report noted that it was an improving school with high expectations of its students. In 2015 the school was inspected, and found to be good. A short inspection in 2019 reaffirmed this result.

== Earlier schools called Sale High School ==
In the early part of the 20th century, a pair of private schools in Sale used the same name: Sale High School for Girls, at Oaklands on Marsland Road, and the Sale, Brooklands & Ashton-upon-Mersey High School for Boys on Poplar Grove. The latter became a feeder school for Manchester Grammar School (in 1908), shortened its name to Sale High School for Boys, and in 1936 moved to Woodbourne Road. Alumni of the boys' school include playwright Robert Bolt and novelist John Malcolm Andrews.
