= The Sale (pub) =

Listed pub in Greater Manchester, England

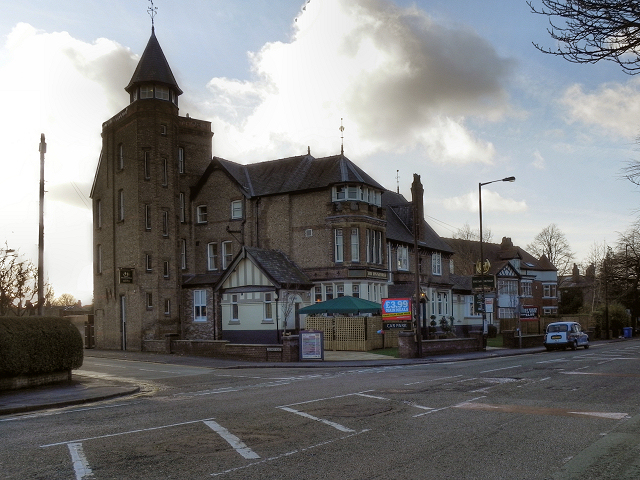
- The pub in 2012

- Location within Greater Manchester
- Former names: The Moorfield; Moorfield Hotel; Sale Hotel

General information
- Type: Public house
- Architectural style: Old English
- Location: 131 Marsland Road, Brooklands, Greater Manchester, England
- Coordinates: 53.4174°N 2.3113°W
- Year built: 1878; 148 years ago
- Opening: 1879; 147 years ago
- Renovated: 1905 (extended); 1960s (altered) c. 2010–11 and c. 2024 (refurbished)
- Client: John and Marmaduke Witty
- Owner: Greene King

Design and construction
- Architects: Lockwood, Smith and Heathcote
- Designations

Listed Building – Grade II
- Official name: The Sale
- Designated: 13 January 2010
- Reference no.: 1393422

Website
- Official website

The Sale is a Grade II listed public house on Marsland Road in Brooklands, an area of Sale within Trafford, Greater Manchester, England. Built in 1878 as the Moorfield Hotel to designs by Lockwood, Smith and Heathcote, it originally formed part of the Moorfields estate created after the closure of the adjoining Sale Botanic Gardens. The building was extended in 1905 and altered in the 1960s. After closing in 2009, it was saved from demolition and listed in 2010, the same year Greene King bought the site. It reopened in 2011 and again in 2024 as The Sale, and the company continues to own the freehold.

== History ==
The building was constructed in 1878 as the Moorfield Hotel, according to its official listing, and opened in 1879. It was designed by the architectural partnership of Lockwood, Smith and Heathcote in the Old English manner, a Domestic Revival style that drew on traditional English vernacular forms and used varied rooflines and textured materials.

The site was laid out by John and Marmaduke Witty of Manchester, who had previously taken over the adjoining Sale Botanic Gardens and Pleasure Grounds. These attractions closed in 1896–97, after which the land was used for new housing. The resulting Moorfields estate remains in place today and provides part of the historic backdrop to the hotel. The 1898 and 1936 Ordnance Survey maps mark the building as the Sale Hotel, with the latter also showing a bowling green to the rear.

In 1905 the hotel was enlarged with a purpose‑built billiard room, designed by the architectural firm Whitelegg and Whittaker. Significant alterations were made inside the hotel and public house during the 1960s, resulting in the loss of many Victorian fittings.

The pub closed in March 2009, after which Trafford Council was informed of plans to demolish the building. A high‑profile local campaign led to it being protected from demolition and designated a Grade II listed building on 13 January 2010. By June 2010 it was reported that Greene King had purchased the site and intended to reopen it as a pub within its Hungry Horse chain. In September 2011, the building reopened as the Moorfield Hotel following refurbishment, with former Manchester City and England goalkeeper Joe Corrigan present at the launch.

In July 2024, it reopened as a pub‑restaurant under the name The Sale, after earlier periods trading as The Moorfield. As of 2025, the pub's freehold is owned by Greene King.

== Architecture ==
=== Exterior ===
The building is constructed of purple and red brick with limited stone detailing, and has a slate roof finished with leadwork. It has a roughly rectangular layout, with a tower on the east side and a lower former billiard room to the west.

It has two storeys, with a taller bay on the east side and the tower rising behind it. The main entrance, now altered, sits beneath a large square stair window. To the west is a projecting bay and, beyond it, a three‑light projection that replaced the original arched doorway. Upper windows are casements set under deep eaves supported by slender timber brackets. The canted bay on the left has triple windows with side‑lights, set between stone sills and lintels, and above its parapet is a small canted window tucked beneath the eaves.

On the east side is a single‑storey entrance with a slate roof and a half‑timbered gable. Behind it stands an octagonal tower with narrow vertical windows marking the line of the internal stair, and a continuous band of glazing just below its steep slate roof. The tower connects to a four‑storey block. The west elevation is gabled and clad in tiles, with a penticed first‑floor window projecting from the wall.

=== Interior ===
The interior has been heavily altered, and none of the original fittings survive in the former ground‑floor public rooms. The main staircase remains in place, lit by the large leaded stair window; it has an open string, shaped newel posts, square fretted balusters, and decorative detailing beneath the treads. A secondary stair has an upswept handrail and similar fretwork. The former billiard room retains its open timber roof.

== See also ==
- Listed buildings in Sale, Greater Manchester
- Listed pubs in Greater Manchester
