= Ashton upon Mersey =

Area of Trafford, Greater Manchester, England

Coordinates: 53.4311°N 2.3336°W

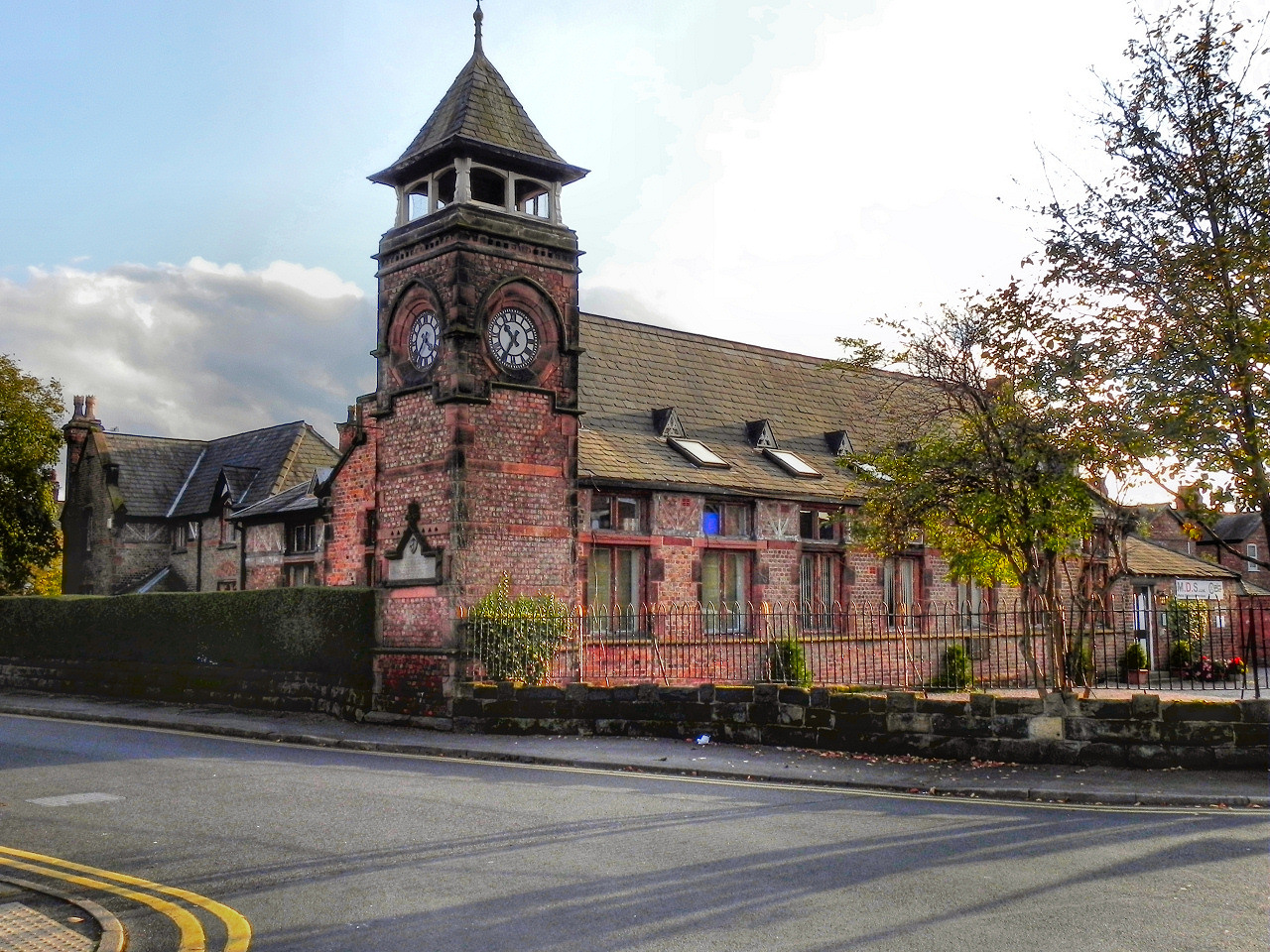
- Former village school and clock tower, Green Lane

- Location within Greater Manchester
- OS grid reference: SJ785925
  - London: 162 mi (261 km) SE
- Metropolitan borough: Trafford
- Metropolitan county: Greater Manchester
- Region: North West
- Country: England
- Sovereign state: United Kingdom
- Post town: SALE
- Postcode district: M33
- Dialling code: 0161
- Police: Greater Manchester
- Fire: Greater Manchester
- Ambulance: North West
- UK Parliament: Altrincham and Sale West

Ashton upon Mersey is an area in Trafford, in Greater Manchester, England. It lies on the south bank of the River Mersey, 5 miles (8.0 km) south of Manchester city centre and immediately adjoins Sale to the east. It gives its name to the Ashton upon Mersey ward, which covers the main part of the former village. Ashton upon Mersey lies within the historic county boundaries of Cheshire, and became part of Greater Manchester in 1974.

== History ==
A 4th century hoard of 46 Roman coins was discovered and is one of four known hoards dating from that period discovered within the Mersey basin. In the 18th century, it was thought that Ashton upon Mersey might have been the site of Fines Miaimae et Flaviae, a Roman station next to the River Mersey. However, this was based on the De Situ Britanniae, a manuscript forged by Charles Bertram, and there is no evidence to suggest any such station existed. "Ashton" is Old English for "village or farm near the ash trees", suggesting that Ashton upon Mersey is of Anglo-Saxon origin.

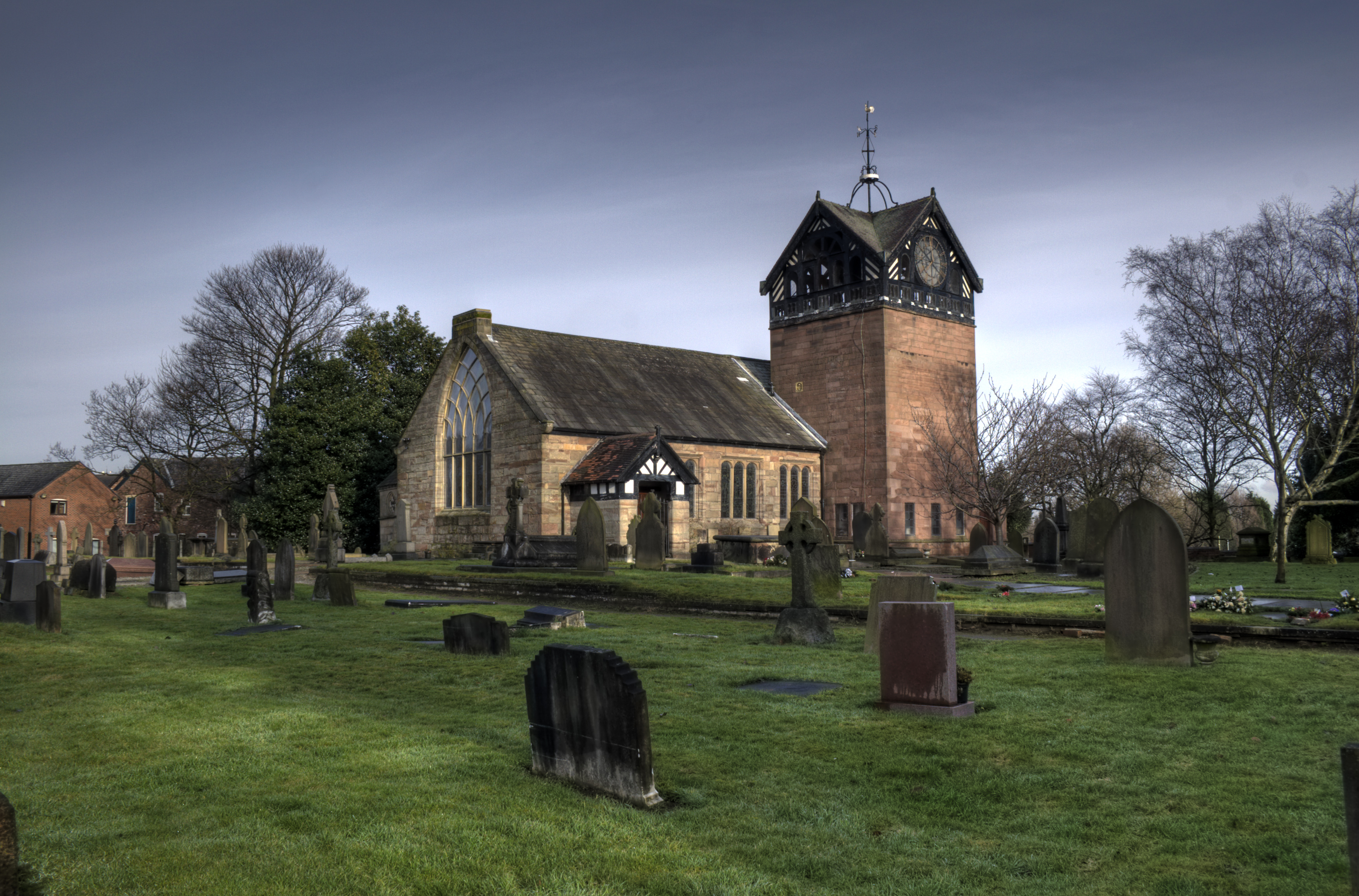
St Martin's Church

The township is first mentioned in 1260. The first building of St Martin's Church dated from 1304, but a chantry on the same site is believed to have existed since the 9th century.

Ashton-on-Mersey School is located in the area.

== Governance ==
There is one main tier of local government covering Ashton upon Mersey, at metropolitan borough level: Trafford Council. The council is a member of the Greater Manchester Combined Authority, which is led by the directly-elected Mayor of Greater Manchester.

=== Administrative history ===
Ashton upon Mersey appears to have historically been part of the ancient parish of Bowdon, but it had become a separate parish by 1350. The new parish contained two townships, called Sale and Ashton upon Mersey, although the Ashton township contained numerous detached portions of the parish of Bowdon within it. Ashton formed part of the Bucklow Hundred of Cheshire.

From the 17th century onwards, parishes were gradually given various civil functions under the poor laws, in addition to their original ecclesiastical functions. In some cases, including Ashton upon Mersey, the civil functions were exercised by the townships rather than the parish as a whole. In 1866, the legal definition of 'parish' was changed to be the areas used for administering the poor laws, and so the Sale and Ashton upon Mersey townships (the latter including the detached parts from Bowdon) became separate civil parishes.

When elected parish and district councils were established under the Local Government Act 1894, Ashton was initially given a parish council and included in the Altrincham Rural District. These arrangements were short-lived; the parish was made a separate urban district a few months later in 1895.

On 1 October 1930, the Ashton upon Mersey Urban District was abolished and the area was absorbed into Sale Urban District. Ashton upon Mersey therefore no longer had a separate council after 1930, although it continued to have a nominal existence as an urban parish within Sale Urban District (which became a municipal borough in 1935). The Ashton upon Mersey civil parish was eventually abolished in 1936 when the Sale parish was enlarged to cover the whole borough. In 1931 (the last census before the civil parish was abolished), Ashton upon Mersey had a population of 9,704.

Ashton upon Mersey was administered as part of Sale from 1930 until 1974, when the borough of Sale was abolished and the area became part of the new metropolitan borough of Trafford in Greater Manchester.

== Notable citizens ==
- Lascelles Abercrombie (1881–1938), poet and professor of English
- Sir Patrick Abercrombie (1879–1957), architect, noted for the redevelopment of post-war London
- J. George Adami (1862–1926), pathologist and Vice-Chancellor of the University of Liverpool
- Stanley Houghton (1881–1913), playwright and author of Hindle Wakes
- Vincent James, animator/cartoonist/illustrator, best known for his design and storyboard work on Count Duckula and Philbert Frog
- Karl Pilkington (b. 1972), author and radio and TV personality
- Andy Rourke (1964–2023), bassist of the Smiths
- Chris Sievey (1955–2010), better known for his comic persona Frank Sidebottom

== See also ==
- Listed buildings in Sale, Greater Manchester
