= Sale Water Park =

Public park in Sale Moor, Greater Manchester

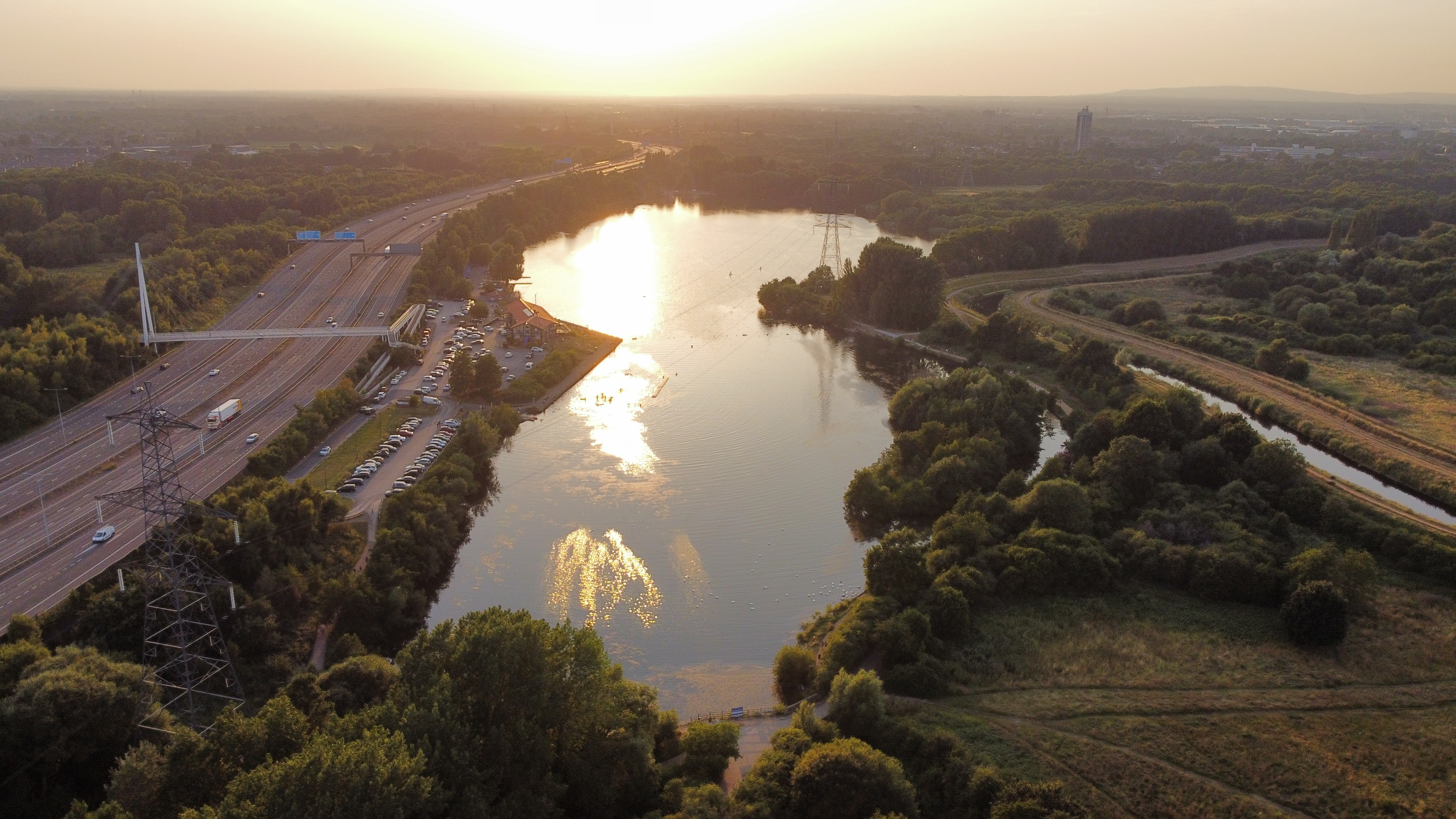
- Sale Water Park on a summer evening, taken from the east. The M60 motorway can be seen to the south and the River Mersey to the north.
- Interactive map of Sale Water Park
- Type: Public park
- Location: Sale, England
- Coordinates: 53.432°N 2.299°W
- Area: 152 acres (62 ha)
- Created: 1979; 47 years ago
- Operator: Trafford Council
- Status: Open all year

Sale Water Park is a 152-acre (62 ha) area of parkland including a 52-acre (21 ha) artificial lake in the Metropolitan Borough of Trafford in Greater Manchester, England. Opened in 1979 and owned by Trafford Council, the water park lies in an area of the green belt running through the Mersey river valley between Sale and Stretford, located between the river and the M60 motorway. The lake was formed in the 1970s by the flooding of a gravel pit excavated to provide material for the construction of an embankment raising the motorway 34 feet (10 m) above the Mersey's floodplain. The pit was excavated to a depth of around 115 feet (35 m), making the lake about 90 feet (27 m) deep in places.

The land occupied by the water park was formerly within the grounds of Sale Old Hall, demolished in 1920. All that remains of the hall today is its former lodge, now the club house for Sale Golf Club, and its dovecote, which has been restored and relocated to the nearby Walkden Gardens.

Sale Water Park provides important recreational facilities and wildlife reserves, as well as forming part of the flood defences for the surrounding area of Trafford.

== Broad Ees Dole ==
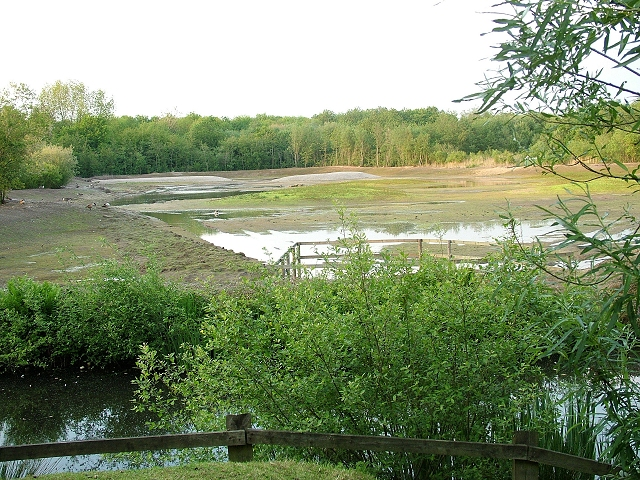
The artificial mud flats

Broad Ees Dole, in the northeast of Sale Water Park, is an important wildlife refuge. Major work was carried out in the 1980s to develop Broad Ees Dole into a wetland area that could be managed to improve the wildlife value of the park, in particular for wild birds, the main lake being too deep to provide food for many bird species. It was officially opened in 1987.

The amount of water entering and leaving the Dole is managed, maintaining its mud flats to make sure they are available for birds like common snipe and little ringed plovers throughout the year. Migratory birds like redshank and common sandpipers also use the Dole as a resting and feeding place on their route north for the summer. In summer and winter, water is allowed in, to prevent the mud from drying up; in spring and autumn, water is released, to expose the mud.

As well as the wading birds, mallards, coots, moorhens and lapwings nest in the reeds in the marshland surrounding the mud flats. Grey herons and kingfishers are also frequently seen. There are no footpaths through the Dole, but the wildlife can be viewed from the paths around its perimeter.

In 2003, Broad Ees Dole became the first site in Trafford to be recognised by English Nature as a Local nature reserve, primarily because of its importance to migratory birds and the diversity of its plant life.

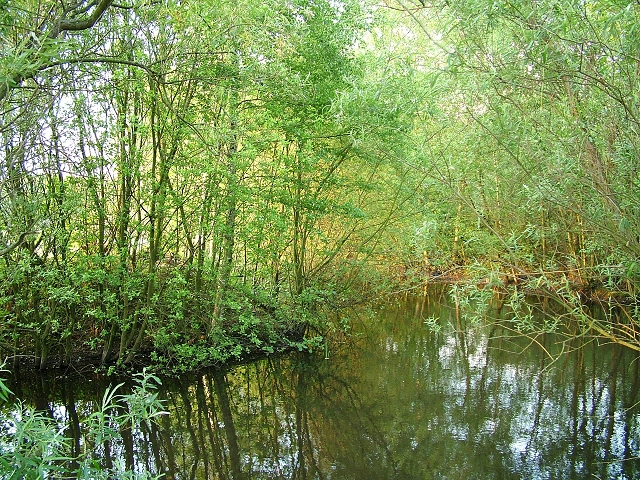
Area around the mud flats

From around 2000, the Dole started to become infested by the alien plant swamp stonecrop. The plant began to significantly reduce the value of the nature reserve to wading birds, so in 2005 major work was undertaken to remove it. The Dole was drained, all of the surface soil was removed and the area treated with herbicide before being allowed to return to marshland.

As well as providing a habitat for wild birds the Dole also contains an orchid meadow in which heath spotted-orchids have established themselves, and there are breeding colonies of smooth and great crested newts.

The etymology of the name Broad Ees Dole perhaps provides a clue to one of the past uses of this area. Ees describes a wetland, and Dole describes a plot of land allocated to the poor.

== Flood mitigation ==
Sale Water Park lies within the floodplain of the River Mersey and plays a significant part in local flood defence. If the water level of the river rises dangerously high, then a sluice gate can be opened to allow water to flow from the river into the water park, where it can be stored until the floodwaters have passed. Sale Water Park is one of a number of similar flood basins in the area. Chorlton Water Park on the north side of the Mersey about 1 mile (1.6 km) upstream is another, along with areas in Didsbury and elsewhere. Monitoring the water level of the river and deciding when to open the sluice gates into the park is the responsibility of the Environment Agency.

== Recreation ==
Trafford Water Sports Centre is situated on the edge of the lake. It was opened in 1988 and is operated on behalf of Trafford Council originally by Deckers, a private company but since has been taken over by Peak Education. The centre provides facilities and training in windsurfing, dinghy sailing and kayaking as well as offering two restaurants. The Sale Water Ski Club is also based at the lake.

The lake is popular with local anglers, containing a wide variety of fresh water fish, such as carp, pike, perch, roach, eel and catfish. Part of the lake has been reserved for the exclusive use of wildlife.

Fishing rights are owned by Sale Waterpark Angling Group. Details to purchase memberships are on the angling website.

On 7 November 2013, Trafford Council announced that the water sports centre would close on 31 December 2013, and that the contract for maintenance would also end. The water sport centre has since re-opened for business and now offers an even wider range of water sports/ activities and can be booked via Peak Pursuits.
