= Woodheys Park =

Coordinates: 53°24′38″N 2°21′13″W

- Pinky Park; Link Road Park
- Interactive map of Woodheys Park
- Location: Sale, Greater Manchester, United Kingdom
- Opened: Early 1970s
- Open: 7:30 a.m. – Dusk

Woodheys Park, also known as Pinky Park, is a park which is located at Kenmore Road, off Woodhouse Lane in Sale, Greater Manchester with an entrance on Link Road. The park is approximately 7.5 hectares (18.53 acres) in size and is situated close to the popular catchment areas of Sale, Broadheath and Timperley. The park has several facilities as well as a woodland retreat.

== History ==
Woodheys Park was opened in the early 1970s. The site is known to locals as 'Pinky Park' because pigs from a field across the neighbouring brook frequently strayed into the park. The park fell into disrepair during the 1990s but has been revised after the turn of the century turning it into a central community resource. The Friends of Woodheys Park have invested a considerable amount of time and effort restoring and improving the park for the surrounding area. With more housing development occurring around it in the last three or four years this has helped increase local house prices by providing a safe place for families to meet and play. In 2006, a fence was erected around the park by the council to improve security of the park at night, creating mixed feelings among local residents.

== Park facilities ==
The park has an 18-hole pitch and putt course, a play area for children under 7, a five a side football pitch, a smaller pitch with cricket stumps and goalposts, a meeting room available for hire, and public toilets, which are open for the duration of the park opening.
