= John Andrews (writer, born 1936) =

English writer

John Malcolm Andrews (born 21 August 1936) is an English author. He is the author of the Price Guide to Antique Furniture (1968) and Managing Editor of Antique Collecting magazine. Using the pen name John Malcolm, he is the author of the Tim Simpson series of art crime novels.

== Biography ==
Born in Chorlton-cum-Hardy, Manchester, the son of May (née Whiteley) and Ernest Andrews, an engineer, John Andrews was educated at Sale High School in Manchester and The British Schools of Montevideo (1946–1950), before returning to England as a boarder at Bedford Modern School (1950–1955), and at St. John's College, Cambridge, where he read Engineering and was Captain of the Lady Margaret Boat Club. He graduated MA in 1958. Andrews worked as design engineer (1958–63), an export sales manager (1963–70), management consultant (1970–76), and international marketing manager (1976–90) before setting up his own business as a machinery broker in 1990, travelling abroad extensively.

In 1966 he was a founder member of the Antique Collectors' Club and became its first author as John Andrews with The Price Guide to Antique Furniture (1968). He went on to write more books on antique furniture and is currently Managing Editor of Antique Collecting magazine. He was Chairman of the Trustees of Rye Art Gallery from 1995 to 2004.

In 1984 his first crime novel, A Back Room in Somers Town, written as John Malcolm, was published by Collins Crime Club. He went on to write a total of fifteen of the Tim Simpson series of crime novels plus two more with different central characters. He was Chairman of the Crime Writers' Association from 1994–5 and wrote a number of short stories. The art background to many of the Tim Simpson series involves the work of modern painters such as Walter Sickert, Mary Godwin, Sir William Orpen, Gwen and Augustus John, Sir William Nicholson and Ben Nicholson, Sir Alfred Munnings, James Tissot, Wyndham Lewis, C.R.W. Nevinson, the Pre-Raphaelite Brotherhood, Camille Pissarro, Whistler, Winslow Homer, Vincent van Gogh and John Singer Sargent.

Andrews is a member of the Crime Writers' Association and the Society of Authors. He married Geraldine Lacey (a picture restorer) on 25 March 1961. The couple live in East Sussex and have one son.

== Bibliography ==
=== Novels as John Malcolm ===
The Tim Simpson series:

- A Back Room in Somers Town (1984)
- The Godwin Sideboard (1984)
- The Gwen John Sculpture (1985)
- Whistler in the Dark (1986)
- Gothic Pursuit (1987)
- Mortal Ruin, (1988)
- The Wrong Impression (1990)
- Sheep, Goats and Soap (1991)
- A Deceptive Appearance (1992)
- The Burning Ground (1993)
- Hung Over (1994)
- Into the Vortex (1996)
- Simpson's Homer (2001)
- Circles and Squares (2002)
- Rogues' Gallery (2005)

=== Crime Novels ===
- Mortal Instruments (2003)
- The Chippendale Factor (2008)

=== Non-fiction as John Andrews ===
- The Price Guide to Antique Furniture (1968) (revised 1978)
- The Price Guide to Victorian Furniture (1970)
- The Price Guide to Victorian, Edwardian and 1920s Furniture (1980)
- British Antique Furniture (1989), (new editions: 2001; 2005/6; 2011)
- Victorian and Edwardian Furniture (1992), (new edition: 2001)
- Antique Furniture: The ACC Guide to the Antique Furniture of the Western World (1997)
- Arts and Crafts Furniture, (2005), (new edition: 2013)
