= Walkden Gardens =

Park in Sale, Greater Manchester, England

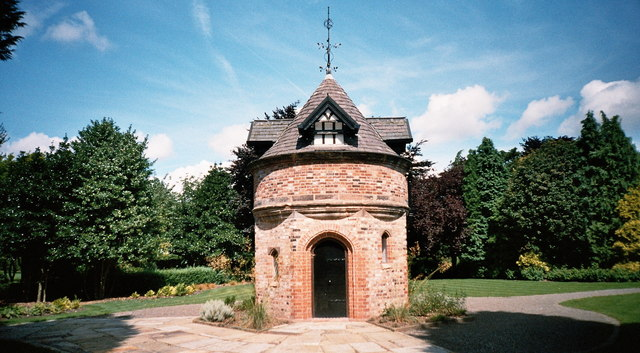
- Sale Old Hall's dovecote in Walkden Gardens.
- Interactive map of Walkden Gardens
- Type: Public park
- Location: Sale, England
- Coordinates: 53°25′06″N 2°18′44″W
- Operator: Trafford Council

Walkden Gardens is a public green space in Sale, Greater Manchester, England. The gardens are named after Harry Walkden on whose death in 1949 his plant nursery passed to Sale Borough Council and provides the site for the gardens. The gardens are owned by Trafford Council and The Friends of Walkden Gardens help maintain and develop the gardens. A notable feature of the gardens is the dovecote moved there from the grounds of the now demolished Sale Old Hall.
