= George Truefitt =

Architect

George Truefitt (1824–1902) was born in 1824 at St George's Hanover Square, London. He practised architecture from age 15 (1839), when he began working with the British architect Lewis Cottingham, until his retirement in 1899.

== Career ==
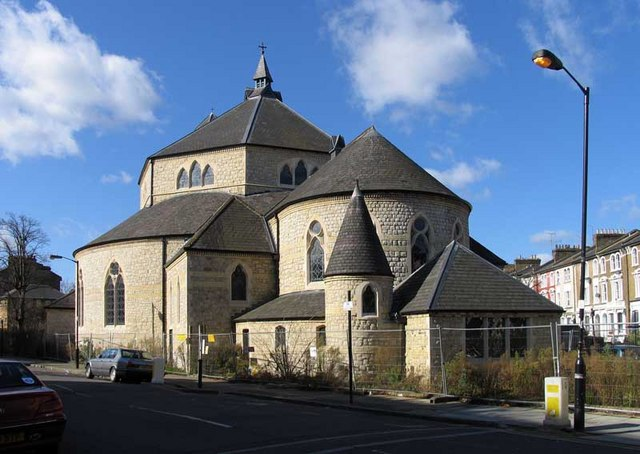
St George Tufnell Park, designed by Truefitt and built 1865-8

Truefitt is famous for designing over 25 different buildings throughout England and over 15 other countries. In his career, Truefitt designed over 250 structures. He wrote a number of books, including Designs for Country Churches. He also inspired Calvert Vaux in the latter's designs.

Truefitt retired in 1899.
