= Sale, Greater Manchester =

Town in Greater Manchester, England

Sale
- Town
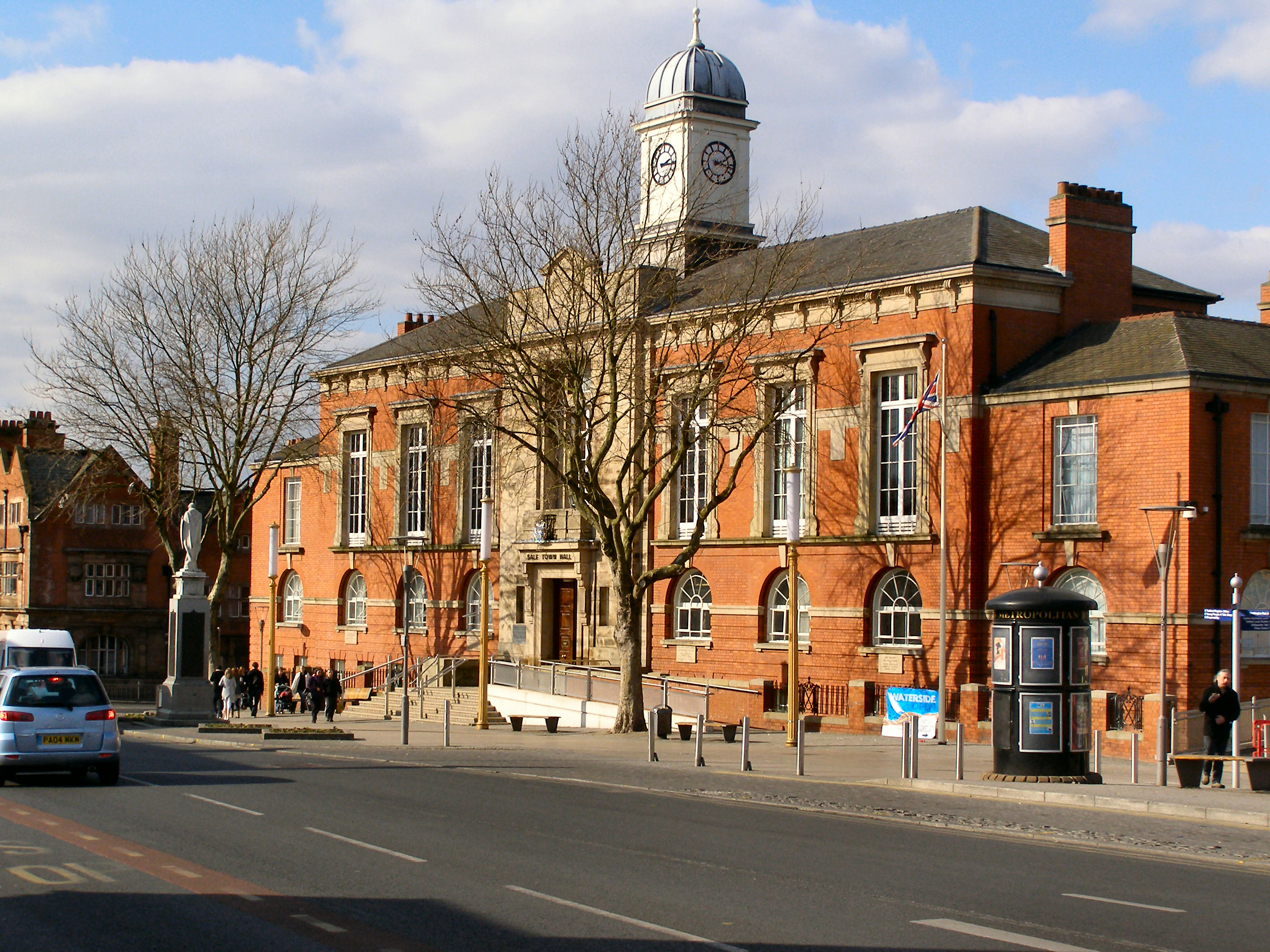
- Sale Town Hall

- Location within Greater Manchester
- Population: 62,550 (Built up area, 2021)
- OS grid reference: SJ785915
  - London: 162 mi (261 km) SE
- Metropolitan borough: Trafford
- Metropolitan county: Greater Manchester
- Region: North West
- Country: England
- Sovereign state: United Kingdom
- Post town: SALE
- Postcode district: M33
- Dialling code: 0161
- Police: Greater Manchester
- Fire: Greater Manchester
- Ambulance: North West
- UK Parliament: Altrincham and Sale West; Wythenshawe and Sale East

Sale is a town in the Metropolitan Borough of Trafford of Greater Manchester, England. It lies on the south bank of the River Mersey, 2 miles (3 km) south of Stretford, 3 miles (5 km) north-east of Altrincham and 5 miles (8 km) south-west of Manchester. Sale lies within the historic county boundaries of Cheshire and became part of Greater Manchester in 1974. At the 2021 census, the Sale built-up area, as defined by the Office for National Statistics, had a population of 62,550.

Evidence of Stone Age, Roman and Anglo-Saxon activity has previously been discovered locally. Sale was historically a rural township in the parish of Ashton upon Mersey; its fields and meadows were used for crop and cattle farming. By the 17th century, Sale had a cottage industry manufacturing garthweb, the woven material from which horses' saddle girths were made.

The Bridgewater Canal reached the town in 1765, stimulating Sale's urbanisation. The arrival of the railway in 1849 triggered Sale's growth as an important town and place for people who wanted to travel to and from Manchester, leading to an influx of middle class residents; by the end of the 19th century, the town's population had more than tripled. Agriculture gradually declined as service industries boomed.

Sale became a separate ecclesiastical parish from Ashton upon Mersey in 1856 and a separate civil parish in 1866. It was administered as a local government district from 1867, which became an urban district in 1894. In 1930, Sale Urban District absorbed Ashton upon Mersey, and in 1935 it was raised to the status of a municipal borough. The borough of Sale was abolished in 1974, becoming part of the metropolitan borough of Trafford in Greater Manchester.

Since then, Sale has continued to thrive as one of the main urban centres of Trafford due to its proximity to the M60 motorway and the connections to Manchester and other areas by the Manchester Metrolink network.

== History ==
=== Founding ===
A flint arrowhead discovered in Sale suggests a prehistoric human presence at the location, but there is no further evidence of activity in the area until the Roman period. A 4th-century hoard of 46 Roman coins was discovered in Ashton upon Mersey, one of four known hoards dating from that period discovered within the Mersey basin. Sale lies along the line of the Roman road which runs between the fortresses at Chester (Deva Victrix) and York (Eboracum), via the fort at Manchester (Mamucium); the present-day A56 follows the route of the road through the town.

Some local field and road names, and the name of Sale itself, are Anglo-Saxon in origin, which indicates the town was founded in the 7th or 8th centuries. The Old English salh, from which "Sale" is derived, means "at the sallow tree", and Ashton upon Mersey means "village or farm near the ash trees". Although the townships of Sale and Ashton upon Mersey were not mentioned in the Domesday Book of 1086, that may be because only a partial survey was taken. The first recorded occurrences of Sale and Ashton upon Mersey are in 1199–1216 and 1260 respectively. The settlements were referred to as townships rather than manors, which suggests further evidence of Anglo-Saxon origins as townships were developed by the Saxons.

=== Early history ===
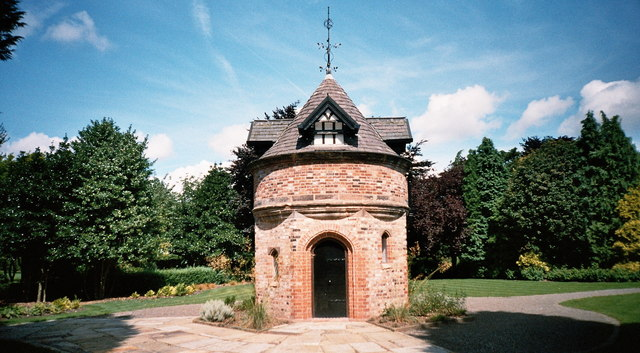
The dovecote is all that survives of Sale Old Hall.

The manor of Sale was one of 30 held by William FitzNigel, a powerful 12th century baron in north Cheshire. He divided it between Thomas de Sale and Adam de Carrington, who acted as Lords of the Manor on FitzNigel's behalf. On de Sale's death, his land passed to his son-in-law, John Holt; de Carrington's land passed into the ownership of Richard de Massey, a member of the Masseys who were Barons of Dunham. Sale descended through the Holt and Massey families until the 17th century, when their respective lands were sold. Sale Old Hall was built in about 1603 for James Massey, probably to replace a medieval manor house, and was one of the first buildings in northwest England to be made of brick. It was rebuilt in 1840 and demolished in 1920, but two buildings in its grounds have survived: its dovecote, now in Walkden Gardens, and its lodge, the latter now occupied by Sale Golf Club.

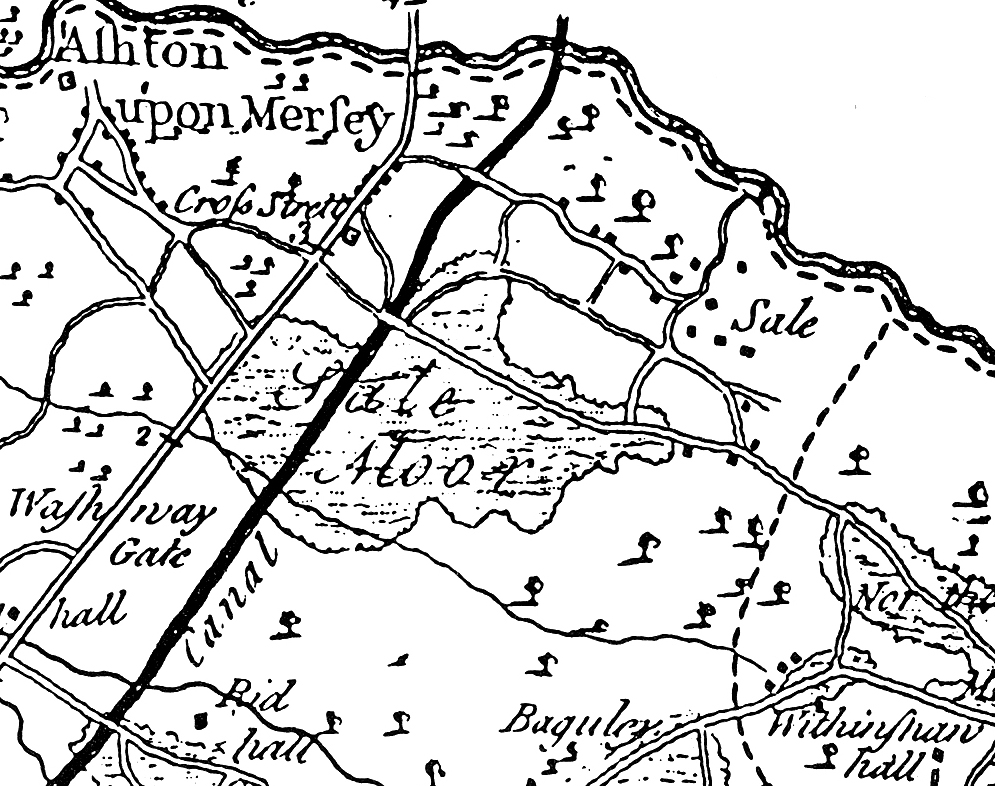
A 1777 map of the area around Sale, showing the townships of Sale and Ashton upon Mersey and the separate village of Cross Street (Baguley and Wythenshawe Hall are in the south-east)

In 1745, Crossford Bridge, which dated back to at least 1367, was torn down. It was one of a series of bridges crossing the River Mersey destroyed by order of the government, to slow the advance of Jacobite forces during the Jacobite rising. The Jacobites repaired the bridge upon reaching Manchester, and used it to send a small force into Sale and Altrincham. Their intention was to deceive the authorities into believing that the Jacobites were heading for Chester. The feint was successful and the main Jacobite army later marched south through Cheadle and Stockport instead.

The extension of the Bridgewater Canal to Runcorn was completed as far as Sale by 1765, and transformed the town's economy by providing a quick and cheap route into Manchester for fresh produce. Farmers who took their wares to market in Manchester brought back night soil to fertilise the fields. Not everyone benefited from the canal however; several yeomen claimed that their crops were damaged by flooding from the Barfoot Bridge aqueduct.

The village of Cross Street was first referred to in 1586 and is believed to have originated around this time. A 1777 map shows Cross Street, on the site of the road now of the same name, divided between the townships of Sale and Ashton upon Mersey. The map also shows that Sale was spread out, mainly consisting of farmhouses around Dane Road, Fairy Lane, and Old Hall Road.

About 300 acres (120 hectares) of "wasteland" known as Sale Moor was enclosed in 1807, to be divided between the landowners in Sale. This was part of a nationwide initiative to begin cultivation of common land to lessen the food shortage caused by the Napoleonic Wars. Records of poor relief in the town start in 1808, a time when the region was in the grip of an economic depression. Poorhouses, where paupers could stay rent-free, were built in the early-19th century, reflecting the poor state of the local economy. In 1829, Samuel Brooks acquired 515 acres (208 hectares) of land in Sale – about a quarter of the township – from George Grey, 6th Earl of Stamford. The area later became known as Brooklands after the land owner.

=== Development ===
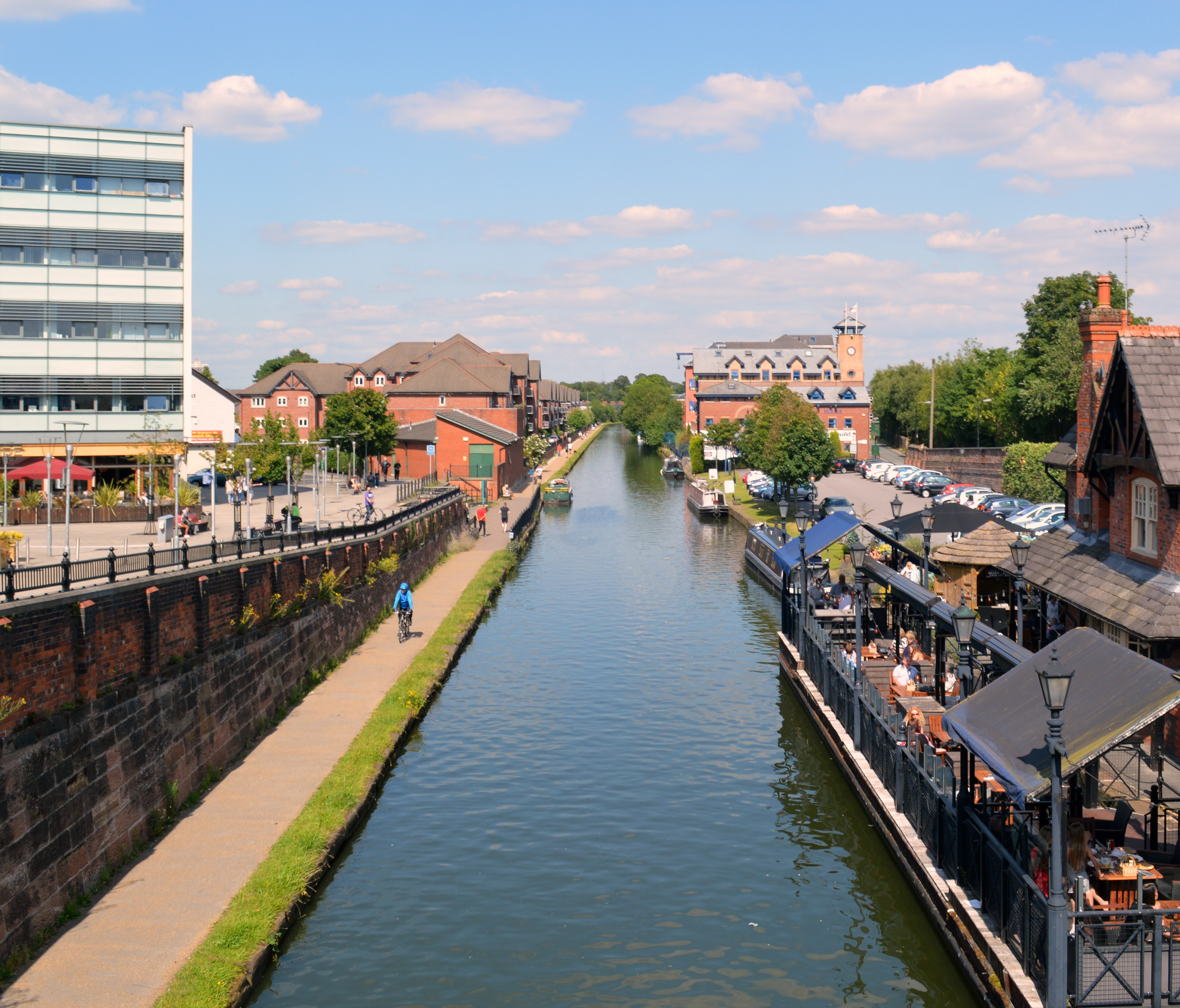
View of the Bridgewater Canal, looking north towards Stretford; the Metrolink tram line runs parallel with the canal

The Manchester, South Junction and Altrincham Railway opened in 1849, and led to the middle classes using Sale as a commuter town, a residence away from their place of work. This resulted in Sale's population more than tripling by the end of the 19th century. The land in Sale Moor was the cheapest in the town because the soil was poor and difficult to cultivate, which was part of the reason the area was common land until the early 19th century. However, when the railway opened, Sale Moor was close to the station and became the most expensive area in Sale. Villas were built in Sale Moor, and a few in Ashton upon Mersey as the demand for land increased. They were often decorated with stained glass or different coloured bricks in an attempt to make them "mansions in miniature" for the aspiring middle class.

Pressure from an increasing population led to the town being supplied with amenities such as sewers, which were built in 1875–1880; and Sale was connected to the telephone network in 1888. As in the late-19th century, the early-20th century saw a great deal of construction work in Sale. The town's first swimming baths were built in 1914, and its first cinema, the Palace, was opened during the First World War. The end of the war in 1918 resulted in a rush of marriages, which highlighted a shortage of housing. The local councils of Sale and Ashton upon Mersey took the initiative of building council housing, and rented it to the local population at below market rates. By the outbreak of the Second World War in 1939, Sale had 594 council houses. The building programme was interrupted by the start of the war.

Sale was never officially evacuated during the war, and even received families from evacuated areas, although it was not considered far enough from likely targets to be an official destination for evacuees. The town's proximity to Manchester, an industrial centre directed towards the war effort, did result in a number of bombing raids. Incendiaries dropped on Sale in September 1940 caused no casualties, but did damage two houses on Norman Road. In a bombing incident the following November, four people were injured and a school was damaged; on 22 December 1940, twelve people were injured by bombs. On the night of 23 December, much of Manchester suffered heavy bombing in what became known as the Manchester Blitz. Six hundred incendiary bombs were dropped on Sale in three hours. There were no injuries, but Sale Town Hall and St Paul's Church were severely damaged. On 3 August 1943, at 11:50 pm, a Wellington Bomber on a training exercise crashed in Walton Park in the south-west of the town. Of the six-man crew, consisting of five members of the Royal Australian Air Force and one member of the Royal Air Force, the pilot and the bomb-aimer were killed.

Sale's shopping centre was redeveloped during the 1960s, as part of the town's post-war regeneration. In 1973, the shopping precinct in the town centre, which had grown up in the mid-19th century, was also redeveloped and pedestrianised in an attempt to increase trade. The construction of the M63 motorway (subsequently renamed the M60) in 1972 led to the creation of Sale Water Park. To minimise the risk of flooding, the new road was built on an embankment, for which the necessary gravel was extracted from what is today an artificial lake and water-sports centre. Opportunities for leisure were increased when the old swimming baths, demolished in 1971, were replaced in 1973 by a new complex built on the same site.

=== Transport ===
The first turnpike road in the area was the latter-day A56 Chester Road between Manchester and Crossford Bridge (on the border between Sale and Stretford). Turnpike trusts collected tolls from road users and used the proceeds to maintain the highway. There was a toll booth on the Sale side of Crossford Bridge. Another section of road between Altrincham and Crossford Bridge was turnpiked in 1765.

The commencement of swift packet services on the newly opened Bridgewater Canal in 1776 made commuting from Sale into Manchester both practical and convenient, with boats travelling at a relatively swift 10 mph (16 km/h). However, the arrival of the Manchester, South Junction and Altrincham Railway in 1849 sounded a death-knell for both the canal packet services and turnpike trusts. Many trusts went into terminal decline, mirroring a national trend.

By 1888, almost all roads and highways were the responsibility of the local authority. Sale's railway station, originally named Sale Moor, was renamed to Sale in 1856. Three years later, Brooklands railway station was opened, followed in 1931 by the opening of Dane Road railway station along with the electrification of the entire line. The line was renovated in the early 1990s and is now part of the Metrolink.

Following the completion of a tramway between Manchester and Stretford in 1901, the British Electric Traction Company applied to Parliament for an extension to Sale. The proposal was amended to continue the line further south, into Altrincham. The line through Sale was owned by Sale Urban District Council and leased to the Manchester Corporation. Services to Sale commenced in 1907. A branch along Northenden Road from the line to Sale Moor was created in 1912. Sale Moor's line had only a single track which, in 1925, resulted in a head-on collision between two tramcars, injuring eight passengers.

Bus services were first introduced to the area in the 1920s, but became more widespread in the 1930s. The buses did not suffer the drawback of being limited to tracks and were therefore more practical than the tram services which, from the 1930s, went into decline. The tram lines along Northenden Road were removed between 1932 and 1934, and throughout Sale in the 1940s.

== Governance ==
There is one main tier of local government covering Sale at metropolitan borough level, which is Trafford Council. The council is a member of the Greater Manchester Combined Authority, which is led by the directly-elected Mayor of Greater Manchester. For national parliamentary elections, Sale straddles the two constituencies of Altrincham and Sale West and Wythenshawe and Sale East.

=== Administrative history ===
Historically, Sale was a township in the ancient parish of Ashton upon Mersey, which formed part of the Bucklow Hundred of Cheshire. In 1836 the township also became part of the Altrincham Poor Law Union.

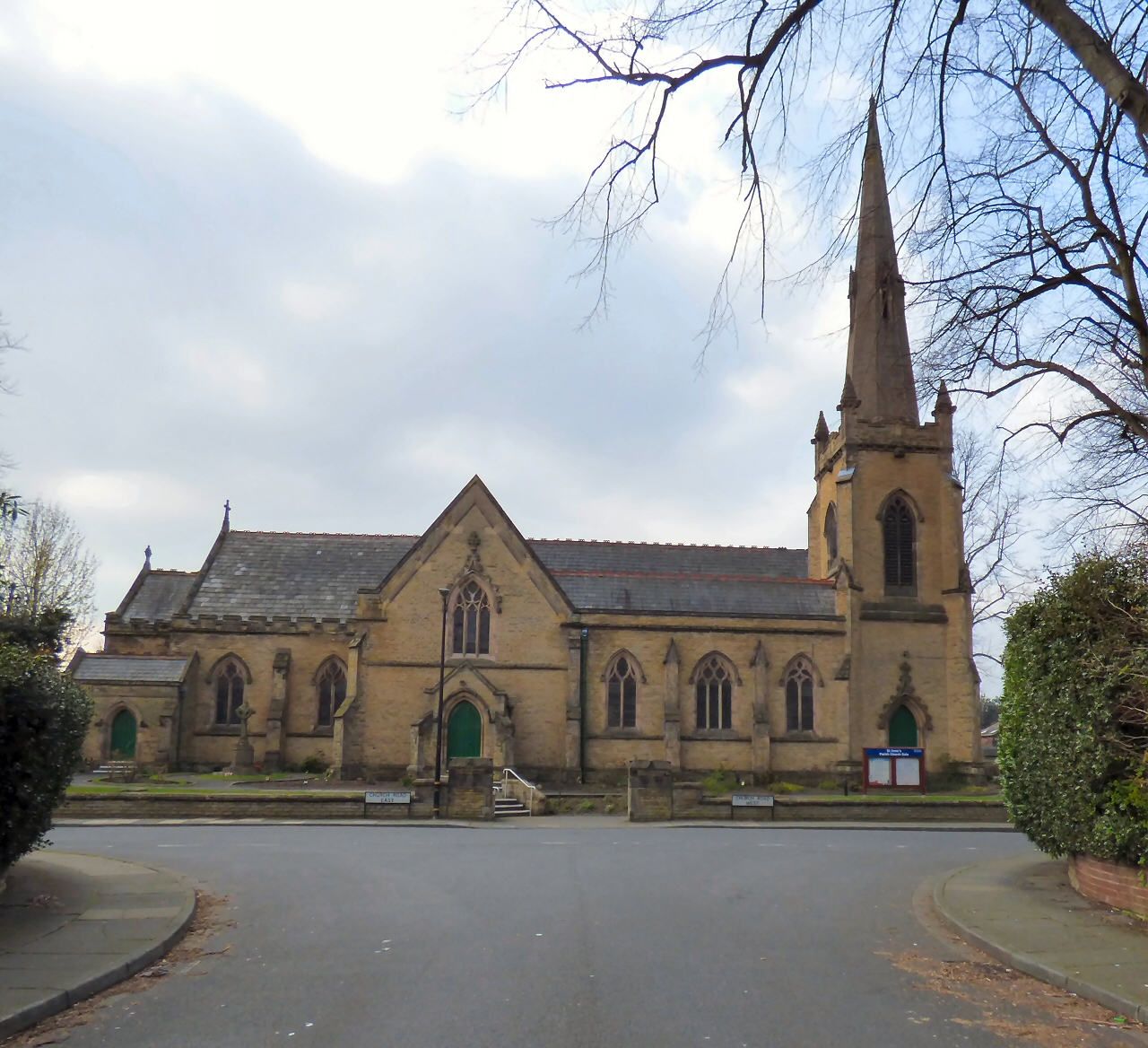
St Anne's Church, built 1854

From the 17th century onwards, parishes were gradually given various civil functions under the poor laws, in addition to their original ecclesiastical functions. In some cases, including Ashton upon Mersey, the civil functions were exercised by each township separately rather than the parish as a whole. In 1866, the legal definition of 'parish' was changed to be the areas used for administering the poor laws, and so Sale also became a civil parish. In terms of ecclesiastical parishes, Sale was separated from Ashton upon Mersey in 1856, following the completion of St Anne's Church in 1854. The ecclesiastical parish was subsequently divided as more churches were built.

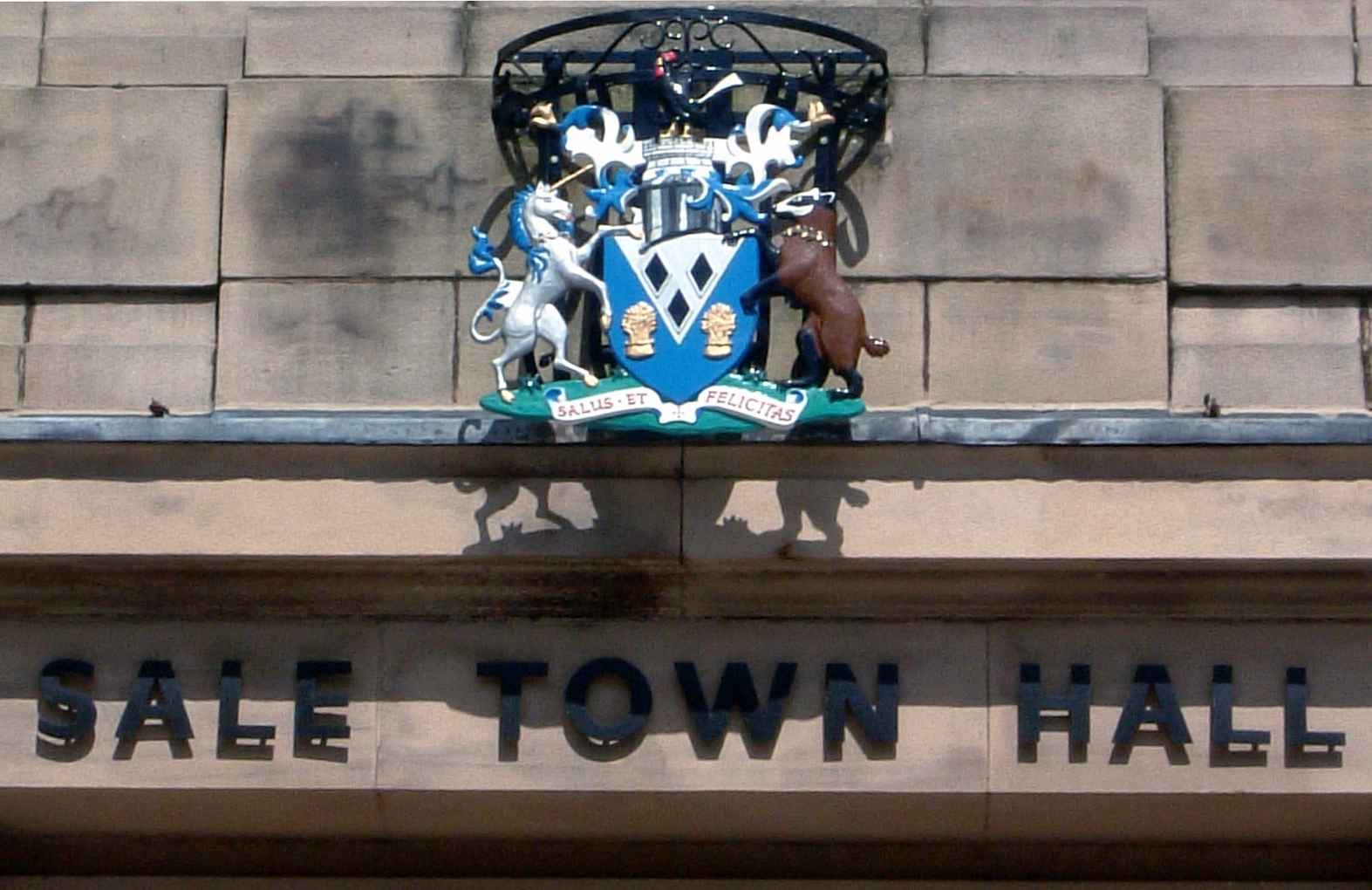
The former Sale Borough Council's coat of arms, as displayed on Sale Town Hall

The Sale township was made a local government district in 1867, administered by an elected local board. Such districts were reconstituted as urban districts under the Local Government Act 1894. The urban district council built Sale Town Hall on School Road to serve as its headquarters, opening in 1915. The council was granted a coat of arms in 1920, with the motto Salus et felicitas (health and happiness).

In 1930, Sale Urban District was enlarged to take in neighbouring Ashton upon Mersey, which had been its own urban district from 1895. In 1935, Sale Urban District was incorporated to become a municipal borough; prior to that it was reported to have been the urban district with the largest population and highest rateable value in the country.

The borough of Sale was abolished in 1974 under the Local Government Act 1972. The area became part of the Metropolitan Borough of Trafford in Greater Manchester.

== Geography ==
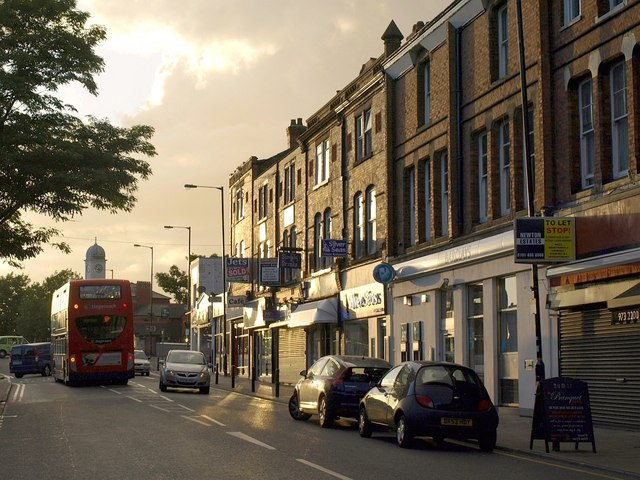
Shops along Northenden Road in Sale

At 53°25′29″N 2°19′19″W (53.4246, −2.322), Sale lies to the north and south of the neighbouring towns of Altrincham and Stretford respectively and five miles (eight kilometres) south-west of Manchester city centre. The district of Wythenshawe is to the south-east. Sale is in the Mersey Valley, about 100 feet (30 m) above sea level on generally flat ground. The River Mersey, which runs just north of the town, is prone to flooding during heavy rains, so the Sale Water Park, close to the town's northern boundary, acts as an emergency flood basin.

Sale's local drift geology consists of sand and gravel deposited about 10,000 years ago, during the last ice age. The bedrock is Bunter sandstone in the west and Triassic waterstone in the east. United Utilities obtains the town's drinking water from the Lake District. Sale's climate is generally temperate, like the rest of Greater Manchester. The mean highest and lowest temperatures (13.2 °C (55.8 °F) and 6.4 °C (43.5 °F)) are slightly above the national average, while the annual rainfall (806.6 millimetres (31.76 in)) and average hours of sunshine (1394.5 hours) are respectively above and below the national averages.

The town's main districts are Ashton upon Mersey in the north-west, Sale Moor in the south-east, and Brooklands in the south-west. The main commercial area is Sale town centre, in the central northern area of the town, but smaller commercial centres are also found in Ashton upon Mersey and Sale Moor. Brooklands is the most densely populated area. Most of the parks, including Worthington and Walton, are in the central and southern areas, leaving Ashton upon Mersey and Sale Moor with a shortage of accessible green space.

Sale's built environment is varied, with a mixture of modern and old buildings. Some terraces, semi-detached houses and villas, survive from the Victorian period, although many of the larger houses have been converted into flats. Many semi-detached houses survive from the 1930s, when there was a need for new housing in the town as a result of a growing population and an increasingly wealthy middle class. Interspersed with these older structures are newer housing developments, such as the estates built in Ashton upon Mersey and the east of Sale during the 1970s.

== Demography ==
Sale ethnicity compared
2001 UK census	Sale	Trafford	England
Total population	55,234	210,145	49,138,831
Foreign born	6.7%	8.2%	9.2%
White	95.1%	89.7%	91.0%
Asian	1.9%	4.6%	4.6%
Black	0.7%	2.3%	2.3%
Christian	78%	76%	72%
Muslim	1.4%	3.3%	3.1%
No religion	13%	12%	15%
Over 65 years old	17%	16%	16%

At the 2001 census, Sale had a population of 55,234. The 2001 population density was 12,727 inhabitants per square mile (4,914/km^{2}), with a 100 to 94.2 female-to-male ratio. Of those over 16 years old, 30.0% were single (never married), 51.3% married and 7.8% divorced. Although the proportion of divorced people was similar to that of Trafford and England, the rates of those who were single and married were significantly different from the national and Trafford averages (Trafford: 44.3% single, 35.6% married; England: 44.3% single, 34.7% married). Sale's 24,027 households included 32.2% one-person, 37.8% married couples living together, 8.3% were co-habiting couples and 8.5% single parents with their children; these figures were similar to those of Trafford and England. Of those aged 16–74, 22.3% had no academic qualifications, similar to that of 24.7% in all of Trafford but significantly lower than 28.9% in all of England. Sale had a much higher percentage of adults with a diploma or degree than Greater Manchester as a whole. Of Sale residents aged 16–74, 26.7% had an educational qualification such as first degree, higher degree, qualified teacher status, qualified medical doctor, qualified dentist, qualified nurse, midwife or health visitor, compared to 20% nationwide.

Originally a working class town, there was an influx of middle class people in the mid-19th century when businessmen began using Sale as a commuter town. Since then, Sale has had a greater proportion of middle class residents than the national average. In 1931, 22.7% of Sale's population was middle class compared with 14% in England and Wales, and by 1971, this had increased to 36.3% compared with 24% nationally. Parallel to this increase in the middle classes of Sale was the decline of the working class population. In 1931, 20.3% were working class compared with 36% in England and Wales; by 1971, this had decreased to 15.4% in Sale and 26% nationwide. The rest of the population was made up of clerical workers and skilled manual workers. The change in social structure in the town was at a similar rate to that of the rest of the nation but was biased towards the middle classes, transforming Sale into the middle class town it is today.

=== Population change ===
According to the hearth tax returns of 1664, the township of Sale had a population of about 365. Parish registers show that the area experienced steady population growth during the 17th and 18th centuries, more so during the latter half of the 19th century (due to the Industrial Revolution). This later growth was less rapid than that seen in neighbouring areas such as Altrincham, Bowdon or Stretford. The increase in growth in the latter half of the 19th century also coincides with the arrival of the railway, indicative of Sale's growth as a commuter town. A huge increase in population in 1921–1931 is accounted for by the administrative merger of Sale with Ashton upon Mersey in 1930. Steady growth thereon is evident until 1981, when the decline of industry in Trafford and the Greater Manchester area accounts for a reduction in the town's population. This follows the general population trend for Greater Manchester, with residents relocating to new jobs.

Population growth in Sale since 1801
Year	1801	1811	1821	1831	1841	1851	1861	1871	1881	1891	
Population	819	901	1,049	1,104	1,309	1,720	3,031	5,573	7,916	9,644	
% change	–	+10.0	+16.4	+5.2	+18.6	+31.4	+76.2	+83.9	+42.0	+21.8	
Year	1901	1911	1921	1931	1939	1951	1961	1971	1981	1991	2001
Population	12,088	15,044	16,329	28,071	38,911	43,168	51,336	55,749	57,824	56,052	55,234
% change	+25.3	+19.6	+8.5	+71.6	+38.6	+10.9	+18.9	+8.6	+4.4	−3.1	−1.5
Source: A Vision of Britain through Time

== Economy ==
Sale compared
2001 UK Census	Sale	Trafford	England
Population of working age	40,272	151,445	35,532,091
Full-time employment	45.5%	43.4%	40.8%
Part-time employment	11.6%	11.9%	11.8%
Self-employed	7.8%	8.0%	8.3%
Unemployed	2.5%	2.7%	3.3%
Retired	14.3%	13.9%	13.5%

During the medieval period, most of the land was used for growing crops and raising livestock such as cattle. The produce from arable farming would have been sufficient to support the local population, but the cattle would have been sold to the ruling classes. Agriculture provided the main source of employment for Sale's residents until the mid-19th century. Industry was slow to develop in the area, as in most of what would become Trafford. This was partly because of the reluctance of the two main land owners in the area, the Stamfords and the de Traffords, to invest. Although weaving was common in Sale during the late 17th and early 18th century, by 1851 only 4% of the population was employed in that industry.

Along with the rest of the region, Sale's economy during the early-19th century was weak, a state of affairs which persisted until the arrival of the railway in the middle of the century. Despite the dominance of agriculture, there was a growing service industry; Sale and Ashton upon Mersey experienced a growth in numbers employed in retail and domestic services in the first half of the 19th century. By 1901, fewer than 20% of Sale residents were employed in agriculture. Employment was available in workhouses for those who could not find work elsewhere. Sale was part of the Altrincham Union, which ran the nearest work house in Altrincham.

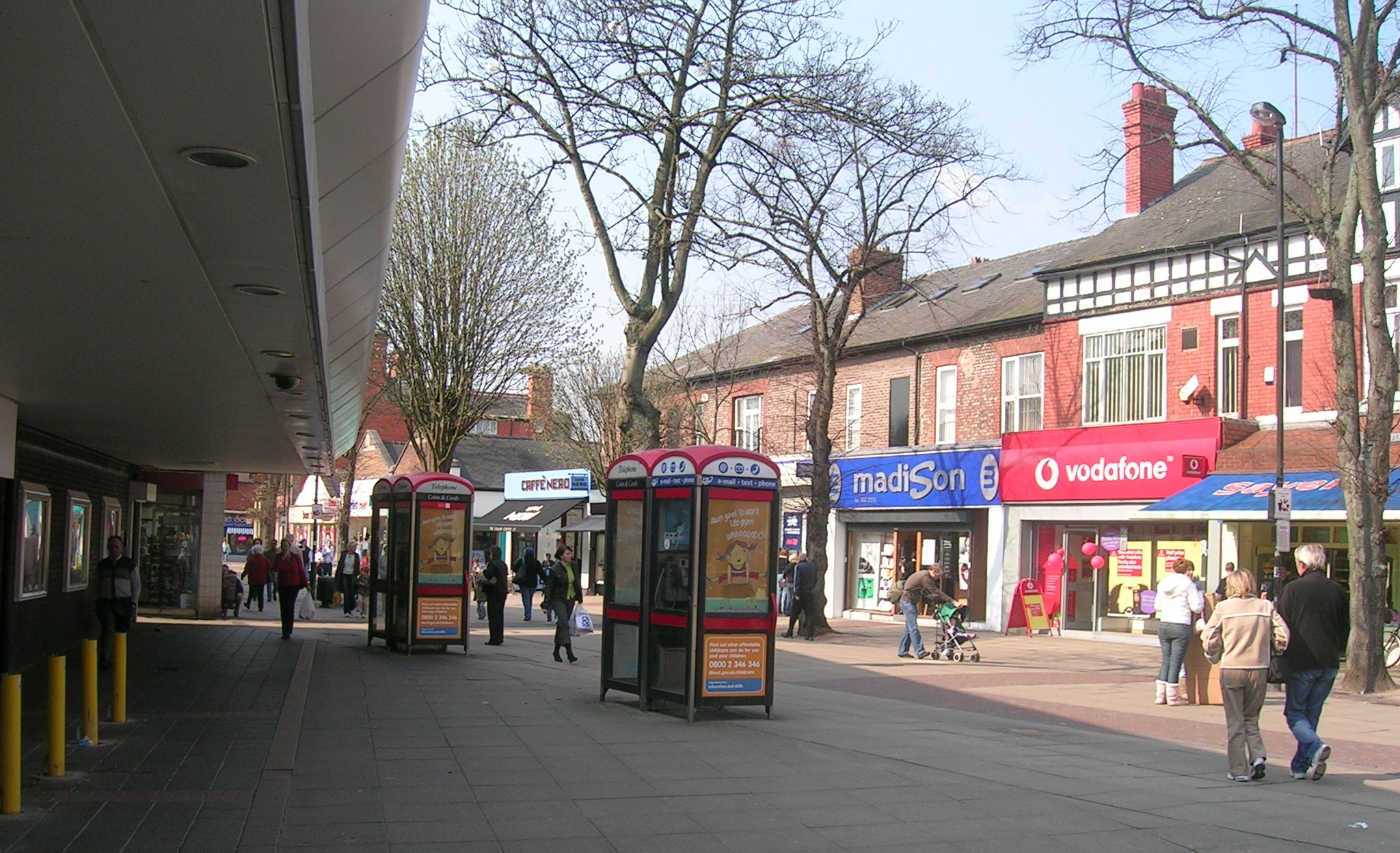
The main thoroughfare of Sale shopping centre

The main shopping centre in Sale, Stanley Square (formerly known as "the Square Shopping Centre"; the name was changed in 2021), was constructed in the 1960s on the site of a former Methodist chapel. Following the Trafford Centre's opening in 1998, it was expected that the centre would suffer, but it has since prospered. In 2003, the Square Shopping Centre underwent a £7 million refurbishment, a major part of the redevelopment of Sale's town centre. It was sold for £40 million in 2005, by which time the Square had experienced an increase in trade and demand for tenancy that had led to an increase of 70% in rental income. The town's economy expanded to the extent that in 2007, at a time when the rest of south Manchester was oversupplied with office space, Sale's available office and commercial space was at an all-time low because of high demand.

According to the 2001 UK census, the industry of employment of residents aged 16–74 was 18.4% property and business services, 15.9% retail and wholesale, 11.1% manufacturing, 10.9% health and social work, 9.1% education, 7.8% transport and communications, 6.1% construction, 6.3% finance, 4.5% public administration, 3.8% hotels and restaurants, 0.7% energy and water supply, 0.5% agriculture, 0.2% mining and 4.7% other. Compared with national figures, the town had a relatively high percentage of residents working in property, business services and finance. The town had a relatively low percentage working in agriculture, public administration, and manufacturing. The census recorded the economic activity of residents aged 16–74, 2.6% students were with jobs, 3.3% students without jobs, 4.9% looking after home or family, 5.2% permanently sick or disabled, and 2.3% economically inactive for other reasons. The 2.4% unemployment rate of Sale was low compared with the national rate of 3.3%.

== Transport ==
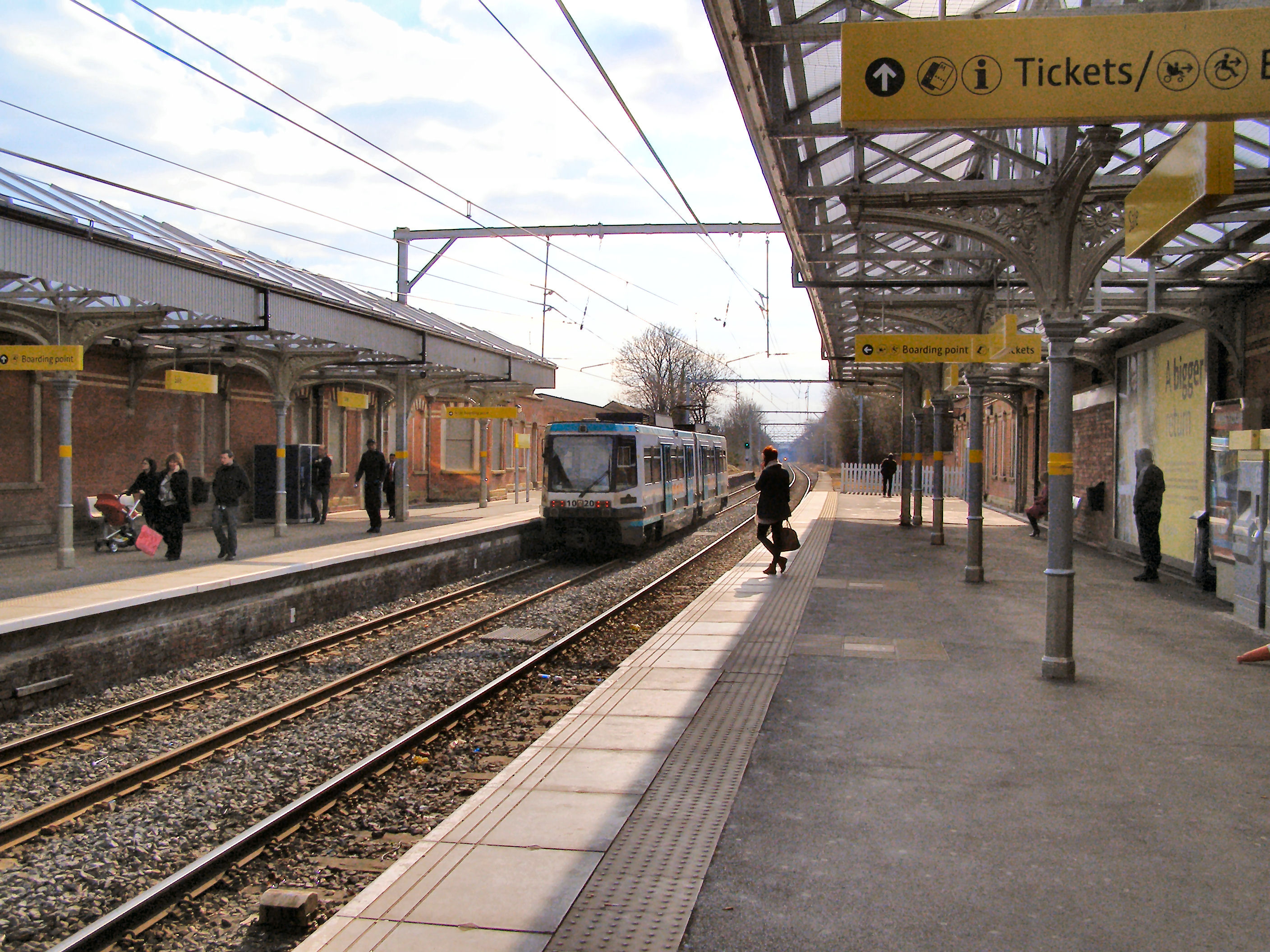
Originally built in wood, Sale station was rebuilt in brick in the late 1870s

Sale Metrolink station is a tram stop on the Altrincham Line of the Manchester Metrolink system. Services operate on two lines:

- Green line: services between Altrincham Interchange and Bury, via Manchester Victoria, depart every 12 minutes in each direction, with more at peak times
- Purple line: services to Altrincham and Manchester Piccadilly depart every 12 minutes in each direction, with more at peak times; evening services extend to Etihad Campus.

The nearest National Rail station is Navigation Road in eastern Altrincham, from where Northern Trains operates generally hourly services on the Mid-Cheshire Line between Manchester Piccadilly, Stockport and Chester.

Bus services are operated primarily by Metroline Manchester, but also by Stagecoach Manchester, Diamond Bus North West, Warrington's Own Buses and D&G Bus; routes connect Sale with Manchester Piccadilly Gardens, Wythenshawe, Altrincham Interchange, Chorlton-cum-Hardy, Manchester Airport and Warrington.

The A56 road runs between Chester and North Yorkshire via Sale, Manchester and Burnley. The M60 motorway, which encircles Manchester, can be accessed via junction 7, just to the north of Sale. The M56, which links Manchester with Chester, and the M62 motorway, between Liverpool to Hull, are about 4 miles (6 km) away. The M6, which runs between Catthorpe Interchange in Leicestershire and Gretna, passes about 7 miles (11 km) to the west.

Manchester Airport is sited 4 miles (6 km) to the south of the town; it is the busiest airport in the UK outside the wider London area;

== Education ==
Sale's first school was built in 1667 and was used until the first half of the 18th century. The second school in Sale was built some time in the 18th century, one of about 30 non-grammar schools founded in Cheshire around this time. By 1831, there were two private schools in Sale and one in Ashton upon Mersey, with the children's parents paying fees for their education. At the same time, there were also four Sunday schools in Sale and one in Ashton upon Mersey, operated by various religious denominations, including Congregationalists, Methodists and Unitarians. The first school-chapel built in Sale as part of a school was constructed by Primitive Methodists in 1839 and still survives. The second school-chapel in the town was St Joseph's Roman Catholic Church, built in 1866, and was replaced by the current school in 1899.

Trafford maintains a selective education system assessed by the 11 plus exam. Sale has one grammar school, two comprehensives and nineteen primary schools:

- Sale Grammar School consists of two parts: one for 11- to 16-year-olds and 900 pupils, and the other a sixth form college with 300 students. The school was described in its 2006 Ofsted report as "outstanding with an outstanding sixth form".
- Ashton-on-Mersey School is an academy school and part of The Dean Trust. It has 1,300 pupils aged 11–16 and 120 students in its sixth form. In its 2019 Ofsted report, it was rated "outstanding" for its 16–19 provision and "good" overall.
- Sale High School, formerly Jeff Joseph Sale Moor Technology College, is a foundation secondary modern school for 11- to 16-year-olds and specialist technology college. It has 1,000 pupils and in its 2006 Ofsted report was rated as "satisfactory".
- Manor Academy provides secondary education to pupils with special needs. It has 140 students aged 11–16 and 20 members of its sixth form and was rated as "good" in its 2007 Ofsted report.

Sale is a leader within Trafford Council in the area of childcare and early education as well. Sale has a broad range of options, such as after-school care, breakfast clubs, childminders, day nurseries, holiday schemes, independent school nurseries, pre-school playgroups and school nurseries. In all the areas within Trafford, Sale provides most variety and has maximum number of options in every area. In areas of After School Care, Breakfast Club, Childminder, Holiday Schemes all the providers rated by Ofsted/CQC are either Good or Outstanding. In areas of Day Nurseries (where one is rated Inadequate), Pre-School Groups (where two are rated requires improvement), School Nurseries (where one is rated Requires Improvement) most of the providers who are rated by Ofsted/CQC are again Good/Outstanding. Apart from these Sale also provides one of three Independent School Nursery in Trafford. Sale also provides a lot of options for support for childcare providers in form of advisory forums and childcare training.

== Religion ==
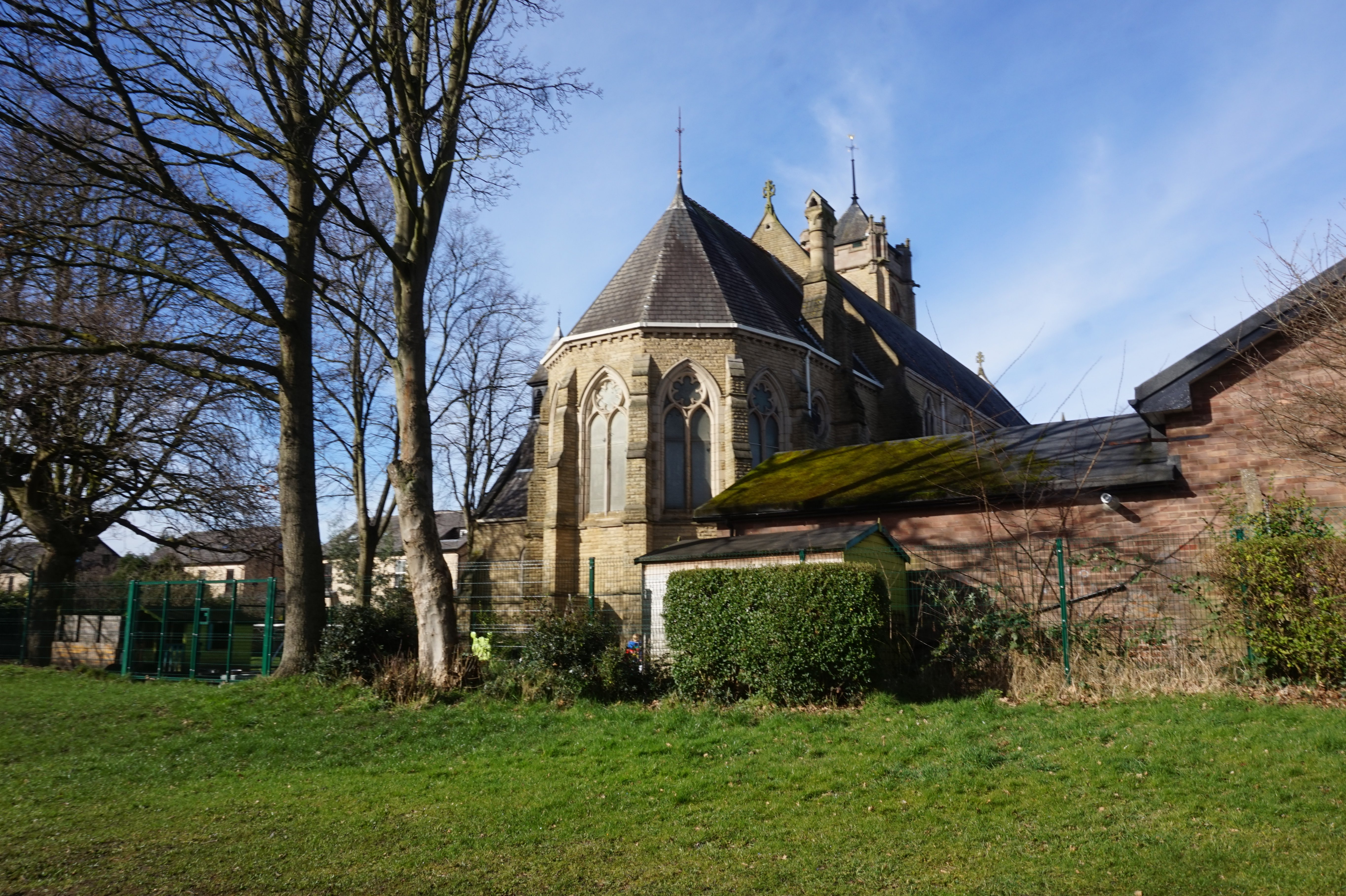
St Paul's Church

Sale is a diverse community with a synagogue and Christian churches of various denominations. The church buildings were mostly constructed in the late 19th or early 20th century in the wake of the population boom created by the arrival of the railway in 1849, although records show that the Church of St Martin in Ashton upon Mersey dates back to at least 1304. Before the English Reformation, the inhabitants of Sale were predominantly Catholic, but afterwards were members of the Church of England. Roman Catholics returned to the area in the 19th century in the form of Irish immigrants. Two of the three Grade II* listed buildings in the town are churches. The Church of St Martin, which was probably originally an early 14th-century timber framed structure, was rebuilt in 1714 after the church had been destroyed in a storm. The Church of St John the Divine was built in 1868, to the design of Alfred Waterhouse. There are three Grade II listed churches in Sale: the Church of St Anne; the Church of St Mary Magdalene; and the Church of St Paul.

At the 2001 UK census, 78.0% of Sale residents reported themselves as Christian, 1.4% Muslim, 0.7% Hindu, 0.6% Jewish, 0.2% Buddhist and 0.2% Sikh. A further 12.9% had no religion, 0.2% had an alternative religion and 5.9% did not state their religion. Sale is part of the Roman Catholic Diocese of Shrewsbury, and the Church of England Diocese of Chester. Sale and District Synagogue is part of United Synagogue under the aegis of the Chief Rabbi of Britain, Jonathan Sacks until his death in 2020. The only mosque in Trafford is the Masjid-E-Noor in Old Trafford, three miles (5 km) away.

== Culture ==
=== Landmarks and attractions ===
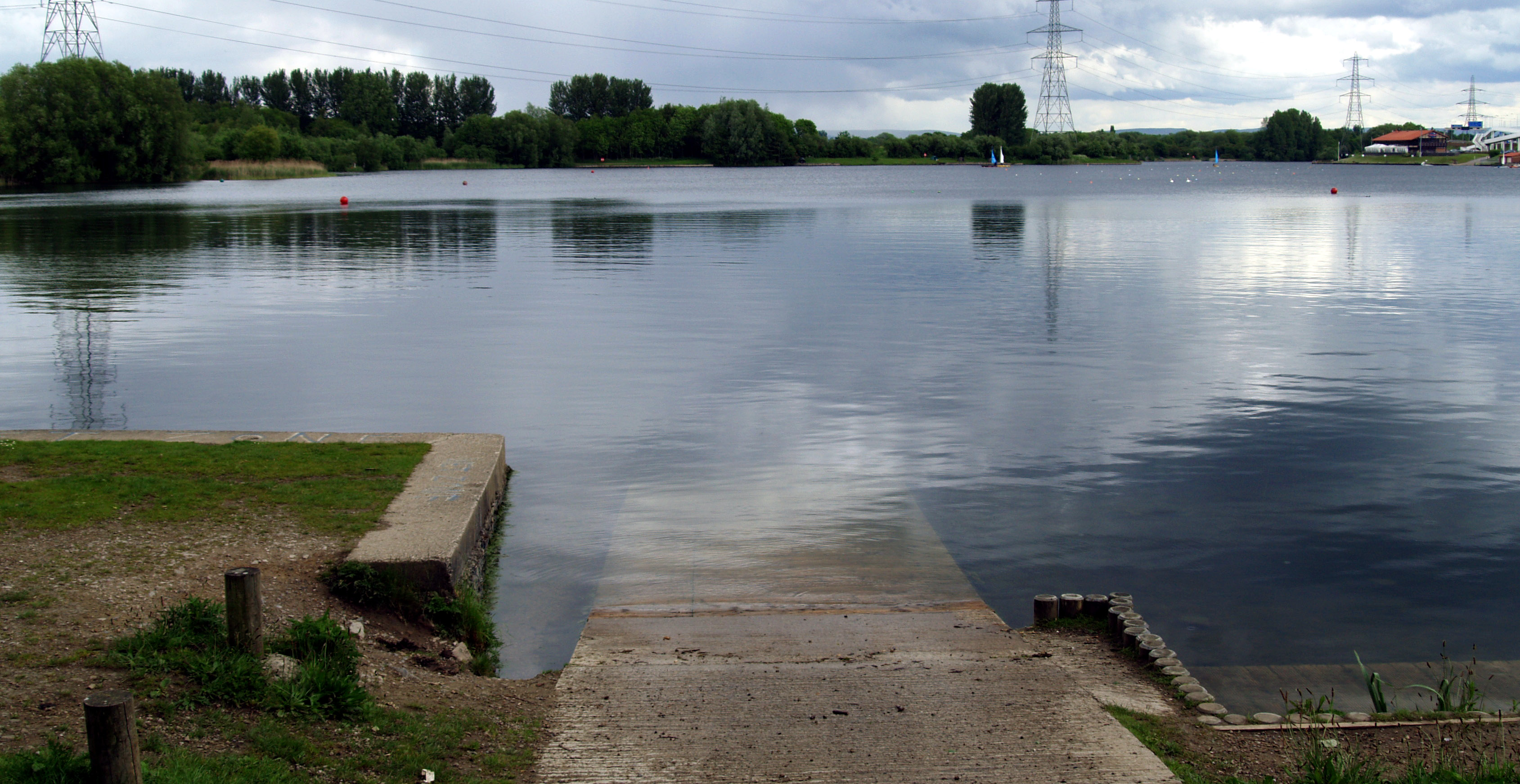
The artificial lake at Sale Water Park has been used for water sports since 1980

Sale has three Grade II* listed buildings – two churches (St. Martin and St. John the Divine) and Ashton New Hall – and eighteen Grade II listed buildings. The cenotaph outside the town hall was designed by Ashton upon Mersey sculptor Arthur Sherwood Edwards and is a Grade II listed building. It commemorates the 400 men from Sale who died in the First World War and the 300 who died in the Second World War. The memorial consists of a statue of a mourning Saint George on top of a granite pedestal. Costing £600 (£32,000 as of 2025), it was funded by public subscription and unveiled in May 1925 in front of a crowd of 10,000.

The oldest surviving building in Sale is Eyebrow Cottage. Built around 1670, it was originally a yeoman farmhouse and is one of the earliest brick buildings in the area. Its name is derived from the decorative brickwork above the windows. It was built in Cross Street, which at the time was a separate village from Sale. Of the twenty-one conservation areas in Trafford, two are in Sale: part of Church Lane, Ashton-upon-Mersey, and Brogden Grove.

A bronze bust of James Joule, the physicist who gave his name to the SI unit of energy, is in Worthington Park. Originally a tower was to have been erected in his honour, but lack of donations led to the production of the bust as a substitute; it was unveiled in 1905. Joule moved to Sale in the 1870s for his health; he died at his home at 12 Wardle Road in 1889, and is buried in Brooklands Cemetery.

The area has several parks and green spaces. Worthington Park, originally called Sale Park, was opened in 1900. It features a bandstand, gardens, play areas, and a skate ramp and is maintained by Trafford Council and The Friends of Worthington Park. Opened in 1939, Walton Park is in the south-west of the town and features a miniature railway. Sale Water Park is an artificial lake, created from a 35-metre (115 ft) deep gravel pit left during the construction of the M60. It opened in 1980 and is a venue for water sports, fishing and bird watching. The water park is the site of the Broad Ees Dole wildlife refuge, a local nature reserve that provides a home for migrating birds. Woodheys Park, also known as Pinky Park, consists of a well-maintained pitch and putt course, grass area, a five a side football pitch and other amenities.

=== Events and venues ===
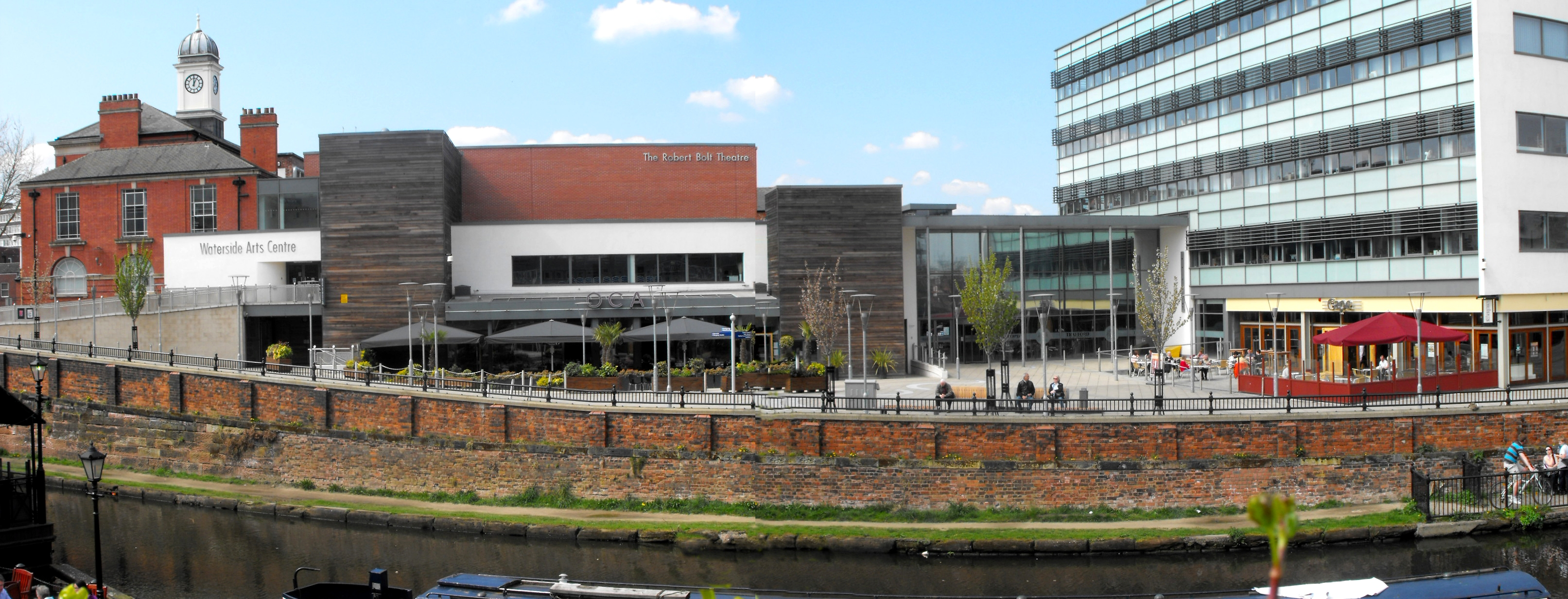
Sale Waterside with the entrance to the Waterside Arts Centre on the left, the Robert Bolt Theatre in the middle, and offices used by Trafford council on the right

Situated next to the town hall, the Waterside Arts Centre houses a plaza, a library, the Robert Bolt Theatre, the Lauriston Gallery, and the Corridor Gallery. The centre, which was opened in 2004, regularly hosts concerts, exhibitions and other community events. Performers have included Lucy Porter, Midge Ure, Fairport Convention, The Zombies and Sue Perkins. In 2004, the centre received the British Urban Regeneration Association Award for its innovative use of space and for reinvigorating Sale town centre.

Sale has a Gilbert and Sullivan society, formed in 1972, which performs at the Altrincham Garrick Playhouse. The group is directed by Alistair Donkin, a former principal comic for the D'Oyly Carte Opera Company. Members of the group have won several awards at the International Gilbert and Sullivan Festival. Sale Brass is a traditional brass band based in Sale, formed in about 1849 as the Stretford Temperance Band. Its first recorded performance was at the 1849 opening of the railway between Manchester and Altrincham.

== Sport ==
The rugby union side Sale F.C. has been based in the area since 1861 and at its present Heywood Road ground since 1905. One of the oldest rugby clubs in the world, its 1865 Minute Book is the oldest existing book containing the rules of the game.

The professional Sale Sharks team was originally part of Sale F.C., but split from it in 2003. Sale now play their matches at Salford Community Stadium, although they retain the use of the Heywood Road ground for training and for the staging of home games involving their reserve team, Sale Jets.

Sale Harriers Manchester Athletics Club was formed in 1911; it still has its historical home at Crossford Bridge. The site is shared with Sale United Football club and Old Alts Football Club. The club has produced successful athletes such as Olympic gold medallist Darren Campbell and Commonwealth Games gold medallist Diane Modahl, both former residents of the town.

Sale Sports Club encompasses Sale Cricket Club, Sale Hockey Club and Sale Lawn Tennis Club. The Brooklands Sports Club is home to Brooklands Cricket Club, Brooklands Manchester University Hockey Club, and Brooklands Hulmeians Lacrosse Club. It also provides facilities for squash, tennis and bowling.

Sale United FC plays at Crossford Bridge and was recognised as Trafford's Sports Club of the Year in 2004. Sale Golf Club and Ashton on Mersey Golf Club have courses on the outskirts of the town, and a municipal pitch and putt is based at Woodheys Park. Trafford Rowing Club has a boathouse beside the canal. Sale Leisure Centre has badminton and squash courts, a gymnasium and three swimming pools. Walton Park Sports Centre has a sports hall for activities, such as five-a-side football. Tennis, crown-green bowls and football facilities are available at the town's parks.

== Notable people ==
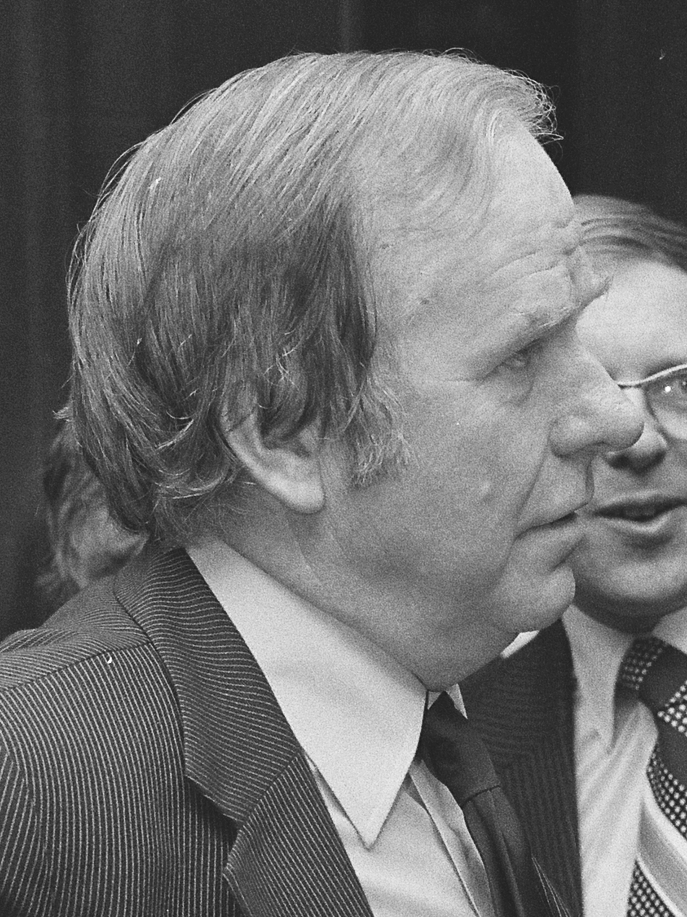
Stan Orme, 1978

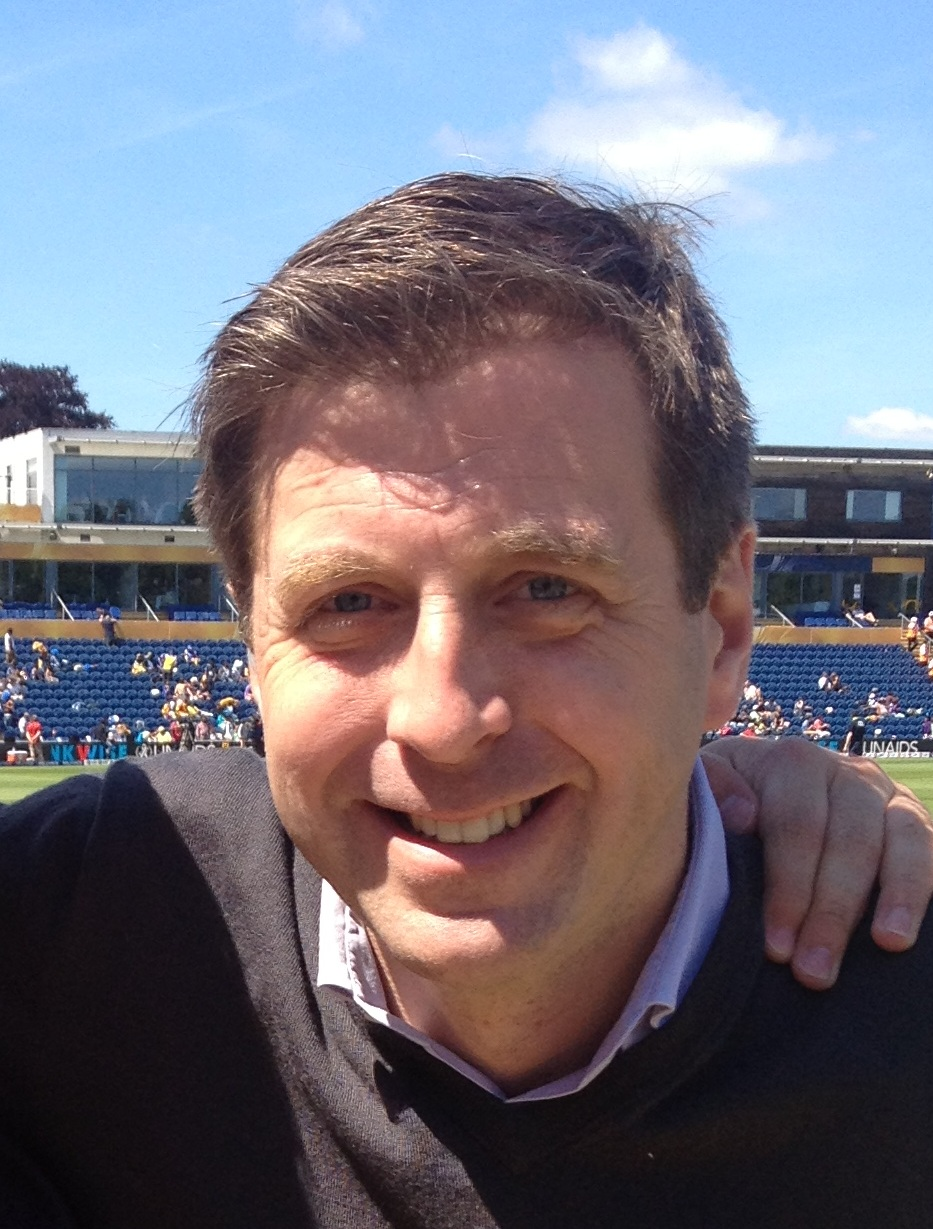
Mark Chapman, 2013

- William Johnson Galloway (1868–1931), partner in engineers and boiler makers W & J Galloway & Sons, and MP for Manchester South West 1895 to 1906.
- Lascelles Abercrombie (1881–1938), poet and literary critic, one of the "Dymock poets".
- Stanley Houghton (1881–1913), playwright, member of the Manchester School; he wrote Hindle Wakes.
- Stanley Orme, Baron Orme (1923–2005), politician and MP for Salford West & Salford East from 1964 to 1997
- Sandy Wilson (1924–2014), composer and lyricist, wrote the musical, The Boy Friend (1953).
- Robert Bolt (1924–1995), playwright and screenwriter, wrote the screenplays for Lawrence of Arabia, Doctor Zhivago, and A Man for All Seasons.
- Anthony Blond (1928–2008), publisher and author, an early director and publisher of Private Eye.
- Sir Terence Farrell (1938–2025), architect and urban designer including Charing Cross railway station, 125 London Wall and the SIS Building
- Claire Davenport actress, (1933–2002)
- Sir Andrew Dillon (born 1954). chief executive of the National Institute for Health and Care Excellence (NICE) from 1999 to 2020.
- Chris Sievey (1955–2010), comedian and musician with the Freshies and from 1984 was Frank Sidebottom.
- Yvonne Fovargue (born 1956), politician and MP for Makerfield from 2010 to 2024.
- Andy Rourke (1964–2023), musician and bassist with the 1980s indie rock band the Smiths.
- David Gray (born 1968), singer-songwriter with White Ladder
- Sir John Stringer (born 1969), Royal Air Force Air chief marshal, since 2026 Deputy Supreme Allied Commander Europe
- Emma Clarke (born 1971), voice-over artist, the voice of automated messages on the London Underground.
- Mark Chapman (born 1973), TV and radio sports presenter, was brought up locally
- Nina Warhurst (born 1980), journalist, newsreader and TV presenter on the BBC News at One.
- Khalil Madovi (born 1997), actor, artist and musician. He played Josh Carter in the CBBC series 4 O'Clock Club (2012–2015).
- Karl Pilkington (born 1972), TV presenter, radio producer and actor.

=== Sport ===
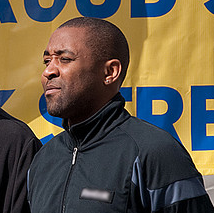
Darren Campbell, 2009

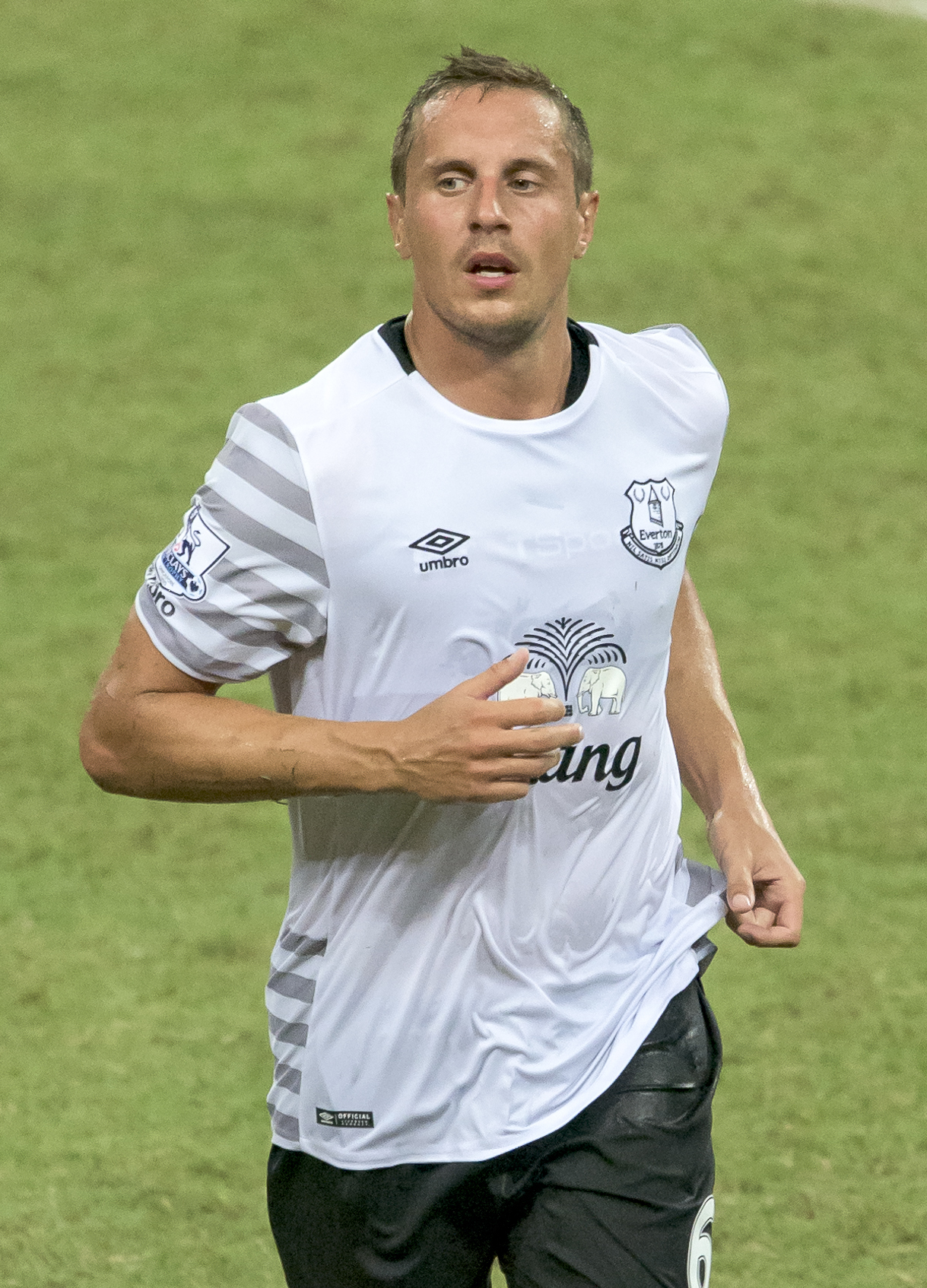
Phil Jagielka, 2015

- Rev. Vernon Royle (1854–1929), cricketer who played 102 First-class cricket matches and one test match
- William Taylor (1885–1959), cricketer who played 107 first-class cricket matches for Worcestershire
- Winifred Brown (1899–1984), sportswoman, aviator and author, won the King's Cup air race in 1930.
- Don Megson (1936–2023), footballer who played 386 games for Sheffield Wednesday
- Ian Mellor (1950–2024), footballer who played 337 games including 122 for Brighton & Hove Albion
- Roger Palmer (born 1959), footballer who played 461 games for Oldham Athletic
- Darren Campbell (born 1973), sprint athlete. silver medallist in the 200m. at the 2000 Summer Olympics and team gold medallist in the 4 × 100 m relay at the 2004 Summer Olympics
- Steve Jagielka (1978–2021), footballer who played 244 games including 176 for Shrewsbury Town
- Phil Jagielka (born 1982), footballer who played 659 games including 254 for Sheffield United & 322 for Everton and 40 for England
- David Tait (1987–2012), rugby union player who played 28 games for Sale Sharks
- Ben Mee (born 1989), footballer who has played 332 games for Burnley
- Greg Leigh (born 1994), footballer who has played almost 300 games including 86 for Bury
- Harry Mallinder (born 1996), rugby union player, has played 82 games for Northampton Saints.
- Patrick Brown (boxer) (born 1999), professional boxer, currently signed to Matchroom Boxing

== See also ==
- Listed buildings in Sale, Greater Manchester
- List of people from Trafford
- Manchester Mummy.
