= South Sea Rose =

1929 film

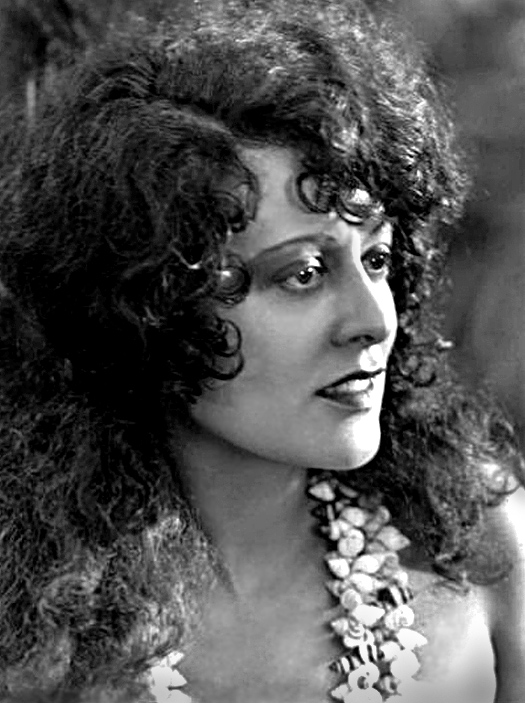
- Lenore Ulric as Rose
- Directed by: Allan Dwan
- Written by: Sonya Levien; Elliott Lester (dialogue)
- Based on: La Gringa by Tom Cushing
- Produced by: Allan Dwan
- Starring: Lenore Ulric
- Cinematography: Harold Rosson
- Edited by: Harold Schuster
- Music by: Peter Brunelli (uncredited); Arthur Kay (uncredited); Glen Knight (uncredited)
- Distributed by: Fox Film Corporation
- Release date: December 8, 1929
- Running time: 69 minutes (7 reels)
- Country: United States
- Language: English

South Sea Rose is a 1929 American sound (all-talking) comedy-drama film distributed by the Fox Film Corporation and produced and directed by Allan Dwan. This picture was Dwan's second collaboration with star Lenore Ulric, their first being Frozen Justice. Much of the cast and crew on Frozen Justice returned for this film.

South Sea Rose is based the 1928 Broadway stage play La Gringa by Tom Cushing, which starred then unknown theatre player Claudette Colbert. Like Frozen Justice, this film is now presumed lost.

== Cast ==
- Lenore Ulric as Rosalie Durnay
- Charles Bickford as Captain Briggs
- Kenneth MacKenna as Dr. Tom Winston
- J. Farrell MacDonald as Hackett
- Elizabeth Patterson as Sarah
- Tom Patricola as Willie Gump
- Ilka Chase as The Maid
- George MacFarlane as The Tavern Keeper
- Ben Hall as The Cabin Boy
- Daphne Pollard as Mrs. Nott
- Roscoe Ates as The Ship's Cook
- Charlotte Walker as The Mother Superior
- Emile Chautard as Rosalie's Uncle

== See also ==
- List of early sound feature films (1926–1929)
