= Lillian Worth =

American actress

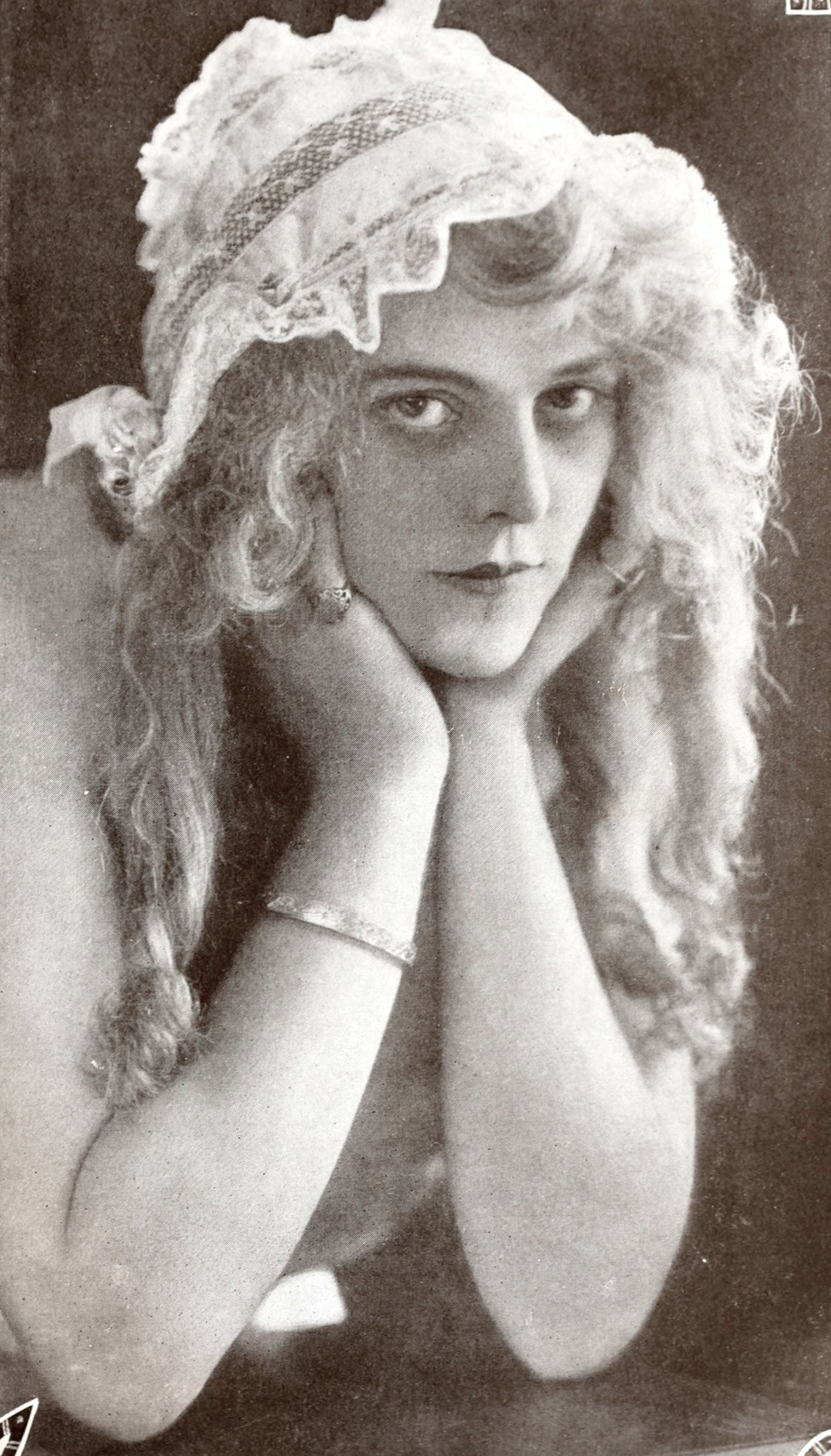
- Worth in 1914
- Born: Lillian Burgher Murphy; June 24, 1884; Brooklyn, New York, U.S.
- Died: February 23, 1952 (aged 67); Los Angeles, California, U.S.
- Resting place: Hollywood Forever Cemetery
- Occupation: Actress
- Years active: 1909–1937
- Spouses: Benjamin Platt Wiggins (m. 1905; div. 1914) Erville Alderson (m. 1918; div. 1925)

Lillian Worth (born Lillian Burgher Murphy, June 24, 1884 – February 23, 1952) was an American actress. She appeared in 58 films between 1913 and 1937.

== Early life and career ==
Lillian Burgher Murphy was born on June 24, 1884, in Brooklyn, New York, the daughter of Katherine Stahler and John Burgher Murphy. After she married in 1905, she began using her husband's surname as her stage name; and by 1909 she, as Lillian Wiggins, had gained public attention and favorable reviews for her performance in the theatrical production The Beauty Spot. By early 1913, she was a leading actress at Pathé's West Coast studio in Edendale, Los Angeles, where she starred in Western films. Pathé transferred Wiggins a few months later to its East Coast studio in Jersey City, New Jersey, and then in October 1913 to its new Southern studio in St. Augustine, Florida. In March 1914, Pathé once again relocated her, dispatching her to Europe, where she worked at the company's Paris studio before moving to London. There she made films first for British and Colonial Kinematography Company and then for Motograph Film Company.

Wiggins returned to the United States in September 1914 and the next year started performing in films for Deer Film Company. Following the dissolution of her first marriage, she married again in 1918. She, however, elected not to use her second husband's surname professionally; instead, she adopted the new stage name Lillian Worth, which is how she continued to be credited until 1937.

== Personal life and death ==
Lillian Worth was married twice. On May 3, 1905, she married Benjamin Platt Wiggins in Brooklyn, New York. The couple separated after a couple of years, and she filed for divorce in Reno, Nevada in 1911, although on that occasion she did not obtain the divorce. She filed again in Los Angeles, California, and was finally granted a divorce in 1914. She then married Erville Alderson, an American actor, on January 14, 1918, in Sydney, Cape Breton Island, Nova Scotia. That marriage too ended in divorce in 1925.

Worth died at age 67 in Los Angeles, California, on February 23, 1952. In death records from that time, she is identified as Lillian Alderson despite the fact that she had divorced Erville Alderson 27 years earlier. Her gravesite is located at Hollywood Forever Cemetery in Los Angeles.

== Selected filmography ==
- The Shadow of Rosalie Byrnes (1920)
- In Search of a Sinner (1920)
- The Adventures of Tarzan (1921)
- Wise Husbands (1921)
- The Lady from Longacre (1921)
- The Foolish Age (1921)
- Rustlers' Ranch (1926)
- On the Stroke of Twelve (1927)
- Upstream (1927)
- The Docks of New York (1928)
- Stairs of Sand (1929)
- The Fighting Sheriff (1931)
- Other Men's Women (1931)
- The White Angel (1936)
