= George MacFarlane =

American actor

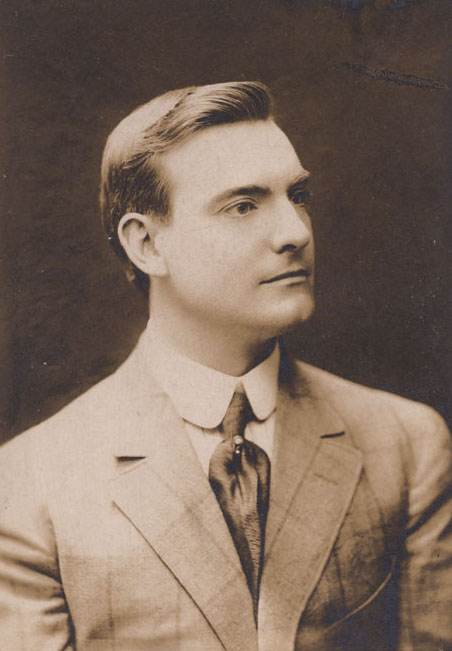
- Born: George Jarvis McFarlane; November 17, 1878; Kingston, Ontario, Canada
- Died: February 22, 1932 (aged 53); Hollywood, California, United States
- Occupations: Actor, singer
- Years active: 1902–1932
- Spouse: Viola Gillette

George MacFarlane (November 17, 1878 – February 22, 1932) was a Canadian-born American actor of both the stage and screen. He began his stage career in Montreal, before moving to New York City. His short film career spanned both the silent and sound film eras. In addition to his acting, he was also a well-known recording artist, who was very popular during World War I, including at least one song which reached number one on the charts in 1915. His career was cut short when he died in a car crash in 1932.

== Early life and career ==
MacFarlane was born in Kingston, Ontario on November 17, 1878. He had six older siblings, and was the son of Alice Gentle (not to be confused with Alice Gentle, opera singer), who was also a musical theatrical performer. The turn of the century would see him appearing in musicals in Montreal, eventually leading to him being cast in 1902 in the role of Captain Corcoran in the Gilbert and Sullivan light opera HMS Pinafore. By 1903 he was in New York City, where he had a starring role in the musical comedy The Fisher Maiden at the Victoria Theater.

== Stage, music, and film career ==
Between 1903 and 1928 he would appear in over two dozen Broadway productions, including musical comedies, straight plays, and operettas, including several stints as Corcoran in HMS Pinafore. In 1907 he would appear in the play The Girl and the Bandit, where he met his second wife, Viola Gillette; the two would marry on April 10, 1920. The two would appear in several plays together, including MacFarlane's first big success, 1909's The Beauty Spot. 1913 would see the beginning of his recording relationship with Victor Records, which would last until 1917. In 1918, he would switch to Columbia Records, where he would record four records, all in that year. He would return to Victor in the early 1920s, where he would make several more records. He would earn the nickname of "America's Favorite Baritone".

Other notable Broadway performances were in the title role in The Mikado in 1912 and again in 1913. 1913 would also see MacFarlane appear in the operetta Miss Caprice (an Americanized version of the German piece, Lieber Augustin), in which he would record the Jerome Kern song, "Look in Her Eyes", which would be his first recording hit. His next Broadway performance, the Lee Shubert and Jacob Shubert musical The Midnight Girl (from the German book Das Mitternacht Madel), garnered him another hit, this time in a duet with Margaret Romaine on "Oh Gustave". He would have two other hits that year, "Can't You Hear Me Calling, Caroline" and "Your Eyes", with the former being one of the biggest hits of the year. 1915 would see him have another hit, "A Little Bit of Heaven", which reached number one on the charts that year.

The following year he would appear in the Klaw & Erlanger production of Miss Springtime, which ran from 1916 to 1917. Although he did not perform the song in the play, MacFarlane would record the Kern song "My Castles in the Air" for Victor Records, which would become another hit for him in 1917. 1917 would see his first foray into the film industry, although he would not appear in front of the camera. Webb Singing Pictures was a silent film where the on-screen performers mimed performing to recorded songs. Along with Enrique Caruso and other singers, MacFarlane was one of the recording artists. The rest of the 1910s, and most of the 1920s would see MacFarlane focusing on the stage, both as an actor and a producer.

1929 would see MacFarlane's return to the big screen, appearing in five films that year in supporting roles. Over the next three years he would be in an additional twelve films, also in supporting roles. On February 22, 1932, MacFarlane was rushing to a preview of one of the five films to be released that year in which he appeared. After mailing a letter, he was struck and killed by the driver of an automobile as he crossed the street on the way to the theater. Two of the films he appeared in, The Famous Ferguson Case and The Heart of New York, would be released after his death.

=== Broadway credits ===
(Per Broadway Internet Database)

Year	Title	Role	Notes
1903	The Fisher Maiden	Robert Luckstone	
1909	The Beauty Spot	Jacques Baccarel	
1911	H.M.S. Pinafore	Captain Corcoran	
1912	Patience	Colonel Calverley	
1912	The Pirates of Penzance	Edward	
1912	H.M.S. Pinafore	Captain Corcoran	
1912	The Mikado	The Mikado of Japan	
1913	The Beggar Student	Symon Symonovicz	
1913	The Mikado	The Mikado of Japan	
1913	H.M.S. Pinafore	Captain Corcoran	
1913	Iolanthe	Strephon	
1913	Lieber Augustin	Augustin Hoffer	
1914	The Midnight Girl	Gustave Criquet II	
1915	Trilby	Alexander McAllister	
1915	H.M.S. Pinafore	Captain Corcoran	
1916–1917	Miss Springtime	Jo Varady	
1918	Out There		
1922	Springtime of Youth	Roger Hathaway	
1925	A Lucky Break	John Bruce	
1926	Rainbow Rose	(non-performer)	Produced by George MacFarlane Productions Inc.
1926	Honest Liars		
1927	We All Do	(non-performer)	Produced by George MacFarlane Productions Inc.
1927	Revelry	Dan Lurcock	
1928	Salvation	Brady	

=== Filmography ===
(Per AFI database)

Year	Title	Role	Notes
1917	Webb Singing Pictures	Singer	Off-screen recorded singing
1929	Frozen Justice	Singer	Lost film
1929	Nix on Dames	Ed Foster	
1929	The Painted Angel	Oldfield	Lost film
1929	South Sea Rose	Tavern keeper and trader	Lost film
1929	Wall Street	Ed Foster	
1930	Cameo Kirby	George	
1930	Double Cross Roads	Warden	
1930	Half Shot at Sunrise	Colonel Marshall	
1930	Happy Days	Interlocutor	
1930	Up the River	Jessup	
1931	Behind Office Doors		
1931	Rich Man's Folly	Marston	
1932	The Heart of New York	Marshall	
1932	Union Depot	Train caller	
1930	Taxi!	Father Nulty	
1930	The Famous Ferguson Case		
1932	Fireman Save My Child	St. Louis fire chief	
