= Lenore Ulric =

American stage and screen actress (1892–1970)

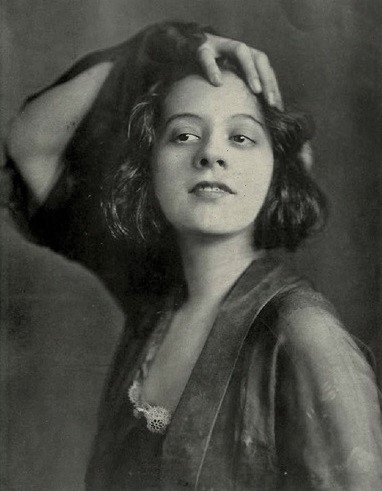
- Ulric in September 1917
- Born: Lenore Ulrich; July 21, 1892; New Ulm, Minnesota, U.S.
- Died: December 30, 1970 (aged 78); Orangeburg, New York, U.S.
- Years active: 1911–1947
- Spouse: Sidney Blackmer (m. 1929; div. 1939)

Lenore Ulric (born Lenore Ulrich; July 21, 1892 – December 30, 1970) was a star of the Broadway theatre as well as Hollywood films of the silent-film and early sound era.

Discovered in 1913 by theater director David Belasco, who would go on to manage her stage career, she was noted for portraying fiery, hot-blooded women of the vamp type.

== Early life, theater, and silent films ==
Lenore Ulrich was born on July 21, 1892, to Franz Xavier Ulrich, who was a United States Army hospital steward, and Ida Ulrich (née Engenhart). Both of her parents were first generation German-Americans. Franz reportedly named his daughter Lenore due to his fondness for the Edgar Allan Poe poem, "The Raven". She later dropped the "h" from her surname. She had four sisters, Isabel, Francis, Alma, and Florence, and a brother, Roy Richard. She left school after completing 3rd grade.

As a young girl, Lenore obtained a job with a stock company in Milwaukee, Wisconsin. She played with stock companies in Grand Rapids, Michigan, and Chicago, Illinois. She worked briefly as a film actress for Essanay Studios and joined another stock company in Schenectady, New York. She found work in The First Man (1911), A Polished Burglar (1911), Kilmeny (1915), and The Better Woman (1915).

She specialized in playing sultry, impassioned women. In 1915, she went to work for Pallas Pictures starring in several silent pictures, such as Frozen Justice and The Intrigue, that survive today at the Library of Congress.

== Broadway ==
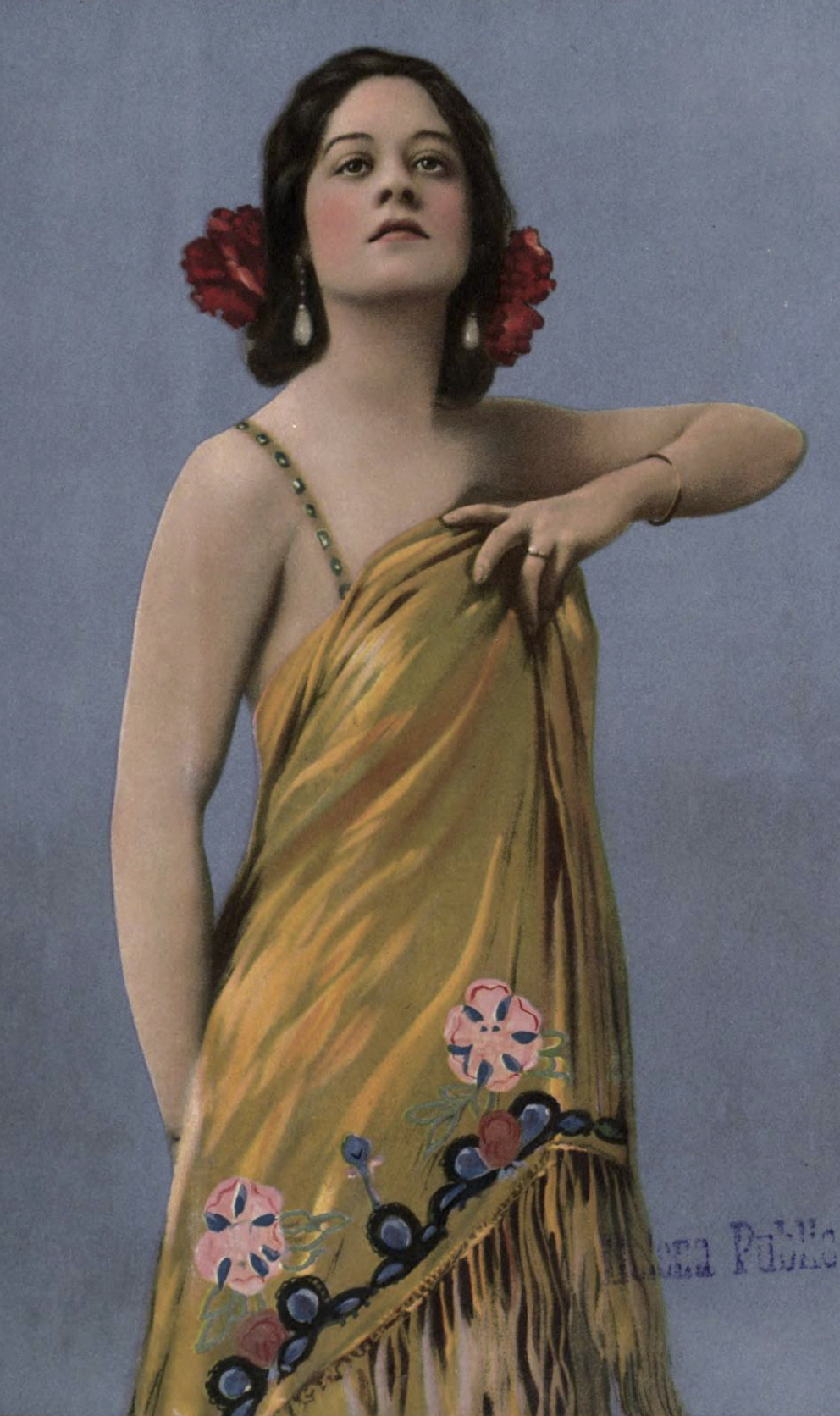
Lenore Ulric on the front cover of Theatre Magazine in May 1918.

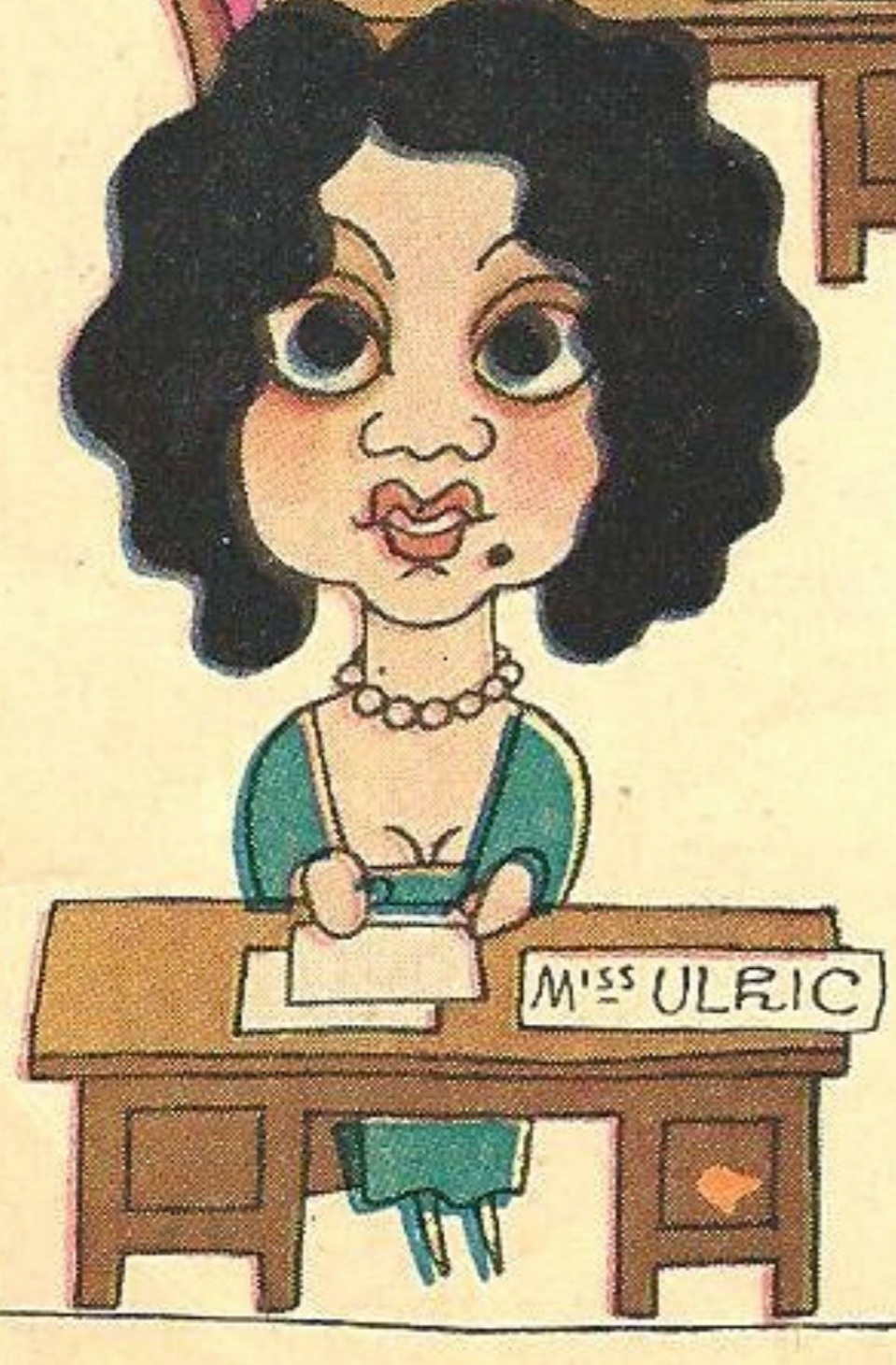
Caricature by Ralph Barton, 1925

Ulric was discovered by theatrical producer David Belasco, who went to see her in The Bird of Paradise in 1913 after Ulric wrote to him requesting that he see her on stage. Belasco, who would go on "fishing trips" to find new stage talents, recalled that it was often a long time between "bites," but he enjoyed the sport as he sometimes would "hook a big one."

After watching her on stage, he asked her to audition at his playhouse. He watched her perform while he sat incognito in one of the theater's seats. "After twenty minutes," he said, "I knew I was watching a very talented and unusual young woman." He then offered her the leading role in The Heart of Wetona. He recalled: "Among the biggest I have ever landed is, I believe, little Miss Ulric: I think she will grow bigger every season she is before the public."

Biographer William Winter called her a "born actress," someone who Belasco hoped would fulfill the theater's need for talent. Winter also notes that no one in her family had ever been involved in acting, adding: "She resorted to the dramatic calling not through mere vanity, the impulse of personal exhibition, or the acquisitive hope of profit, but because her natural vocation is acting."

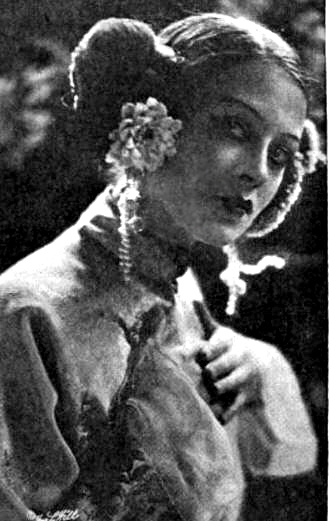
Ulric in The Son-Daughter (1919)

Under Belasco's management during most of her stage career, Ulric played a variety of female roles. Among them was her portrayal of Rose, a French-Canadian orphan, in Tiger Rose (1917). Winter says that Ulric's personality traits allowed her to play the role realistically as written:

Miss Lenore Ulric, who acts the part, is possessed of exceptional natural advantages,—youth; a handsome face; abundant hair; expressive eyes, dark and beautiful; a slender, lithe figure; a sympathetic voice; strong, attractive personality, and an engaging manner. Her temperament is intense, her nature passionate, her style direct and simple. Her acting reveals force of character, experience, observation, thought, sensibility, ardor, definite purpose, and unusual command of the mechanics of art...She is an admirable listener, an excellent speaker...The disposition she exhibits in this performance seems altogether childlike and lovely. Under Belasco's sagacious direction, she should go far.

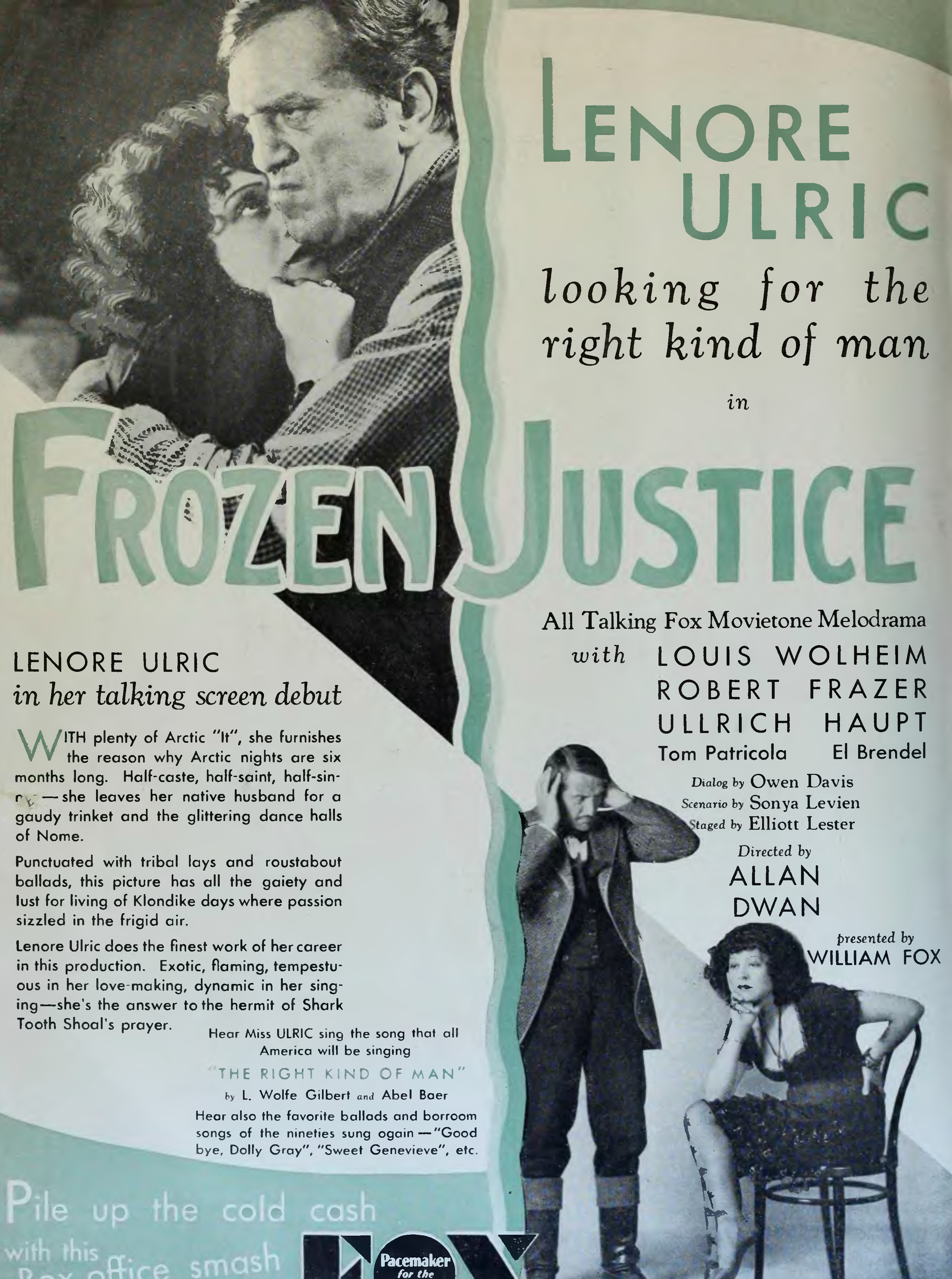
Ullrich Haupt co-stars in Frozen Justice ad from The Film Daily. This is a lost film.

She acted in numerous plays at the Belasco Theater, all under the direction of Belasco. She played in The Son-Daughter (1919), a play about China by Belasco and George Scarborough, which ran for 223 performances. She played a Parisian street urchin in Kiki (1921), a seductress in The Harem (1924), and in one of Ulric's biggest hits for Belasco, the 1926 Lulu Belle, where she played a prostitute, a genre that spawned several Broadway hits in the 1920s. In 1928, she starred in Mima. Other stars who played at the Belasco during that period included Lionel Barrymore and Katharine Cornell.

Success goes to women who are interesting. Nothing else matters. I don't believe even beauty matters.

— Lenore Ulric

After seeing Ulric in some of her plays, British producer Charles Cochrane cabled David Belasco with an "urgent request" that he be granted the privilege of presenting Ulric at one of his London playhouses. During that time, however, Belasco had been writing a new version of Camille for Ulric to star in. According to one critic, "Miss Ulric's youth fits her peculiarly for the part, while her undisputed genius as an emotional actress justifies the prediction that she would be the greatest Camille who has ever been seen upon the stage."

In 1947, after doing seven films in Hollywood, she returned to the Belasco Theater as Charmian in Antony and Cleopatra, which starred Godfrey Tearle and Katharine Cornell in the title roles. (Future stars Eli Wallach, Maureen Stapleton, and Charlton Heston had small roles in the production.) She told a critic, "I certainly never really left the theater." Belasco had managed her stage career until shortly before his death. In a tribute to Belasco, she said:

All of us who were with him depended upon him so much that we'd just flounder around and say, "What do I do now?" He was a good soldier, a hard worker, and a great director.

During the height of her stage career, Ulric was considered one of the American theater's "great stars." She was noted for portraying fiery, hot-blooded women and "femmes fatale." According to the New York Times, theater-goers would go to her plays just to see her, while the play in which she appeared was secondary. Ulric's "name in white lights blazing on the playhouse marquee was always more compelling" than the play itself.

== Hollywood and return to theater ==
Lenore came to Hollywood in 1929 and appeared in Frozen Justice and South Sea Rose. She signed with Fox Film Corporation to make several films with an approximate salary of $650,000. Frozen Justice was directed by Allan Dwan. Some of the scenes were filmed in Alaska. She was successful in a supporting role in Camille, starring Greta Garbo. Ulric returned to Broadway in 1940, acting in The Fifth Column by Ernest Hemingway and again in 1947, in a revival of Antony and Cleopatra.

== Personal life ==
Ulric was married only once, to actor Sidney Blackmer from 1929 to 1939. She accepted some of the blame for their divorce:

"I don't think I'm comfortable to live with. I have a temper. I'm difficult. I'm too quick and too impulsive. And men have a right to be comfortable."

She died of heart failure in Rockland State Hospital, Orangeburg, New York, on December 30, 1970, aged 78.

== Filmography ==
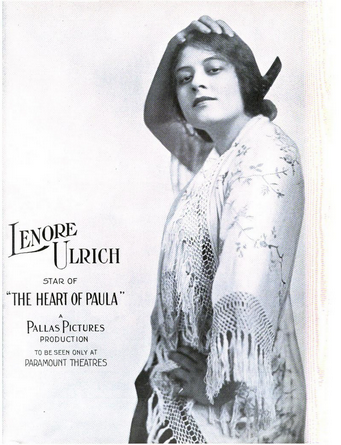
Lenore Ulrich in The Heart of Paula (1916)

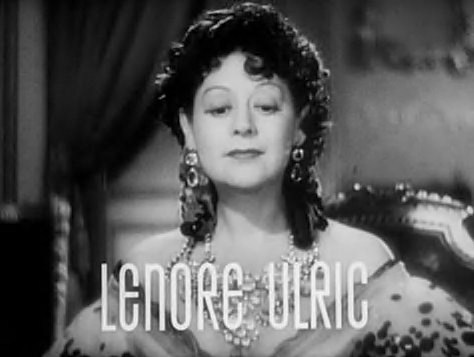
Ulric in Camille (1936)

- The First Man (1911, short) – Miriam Chetwood
- A Polished Burglar (1911, short) – Louise
- For Memory's Sake (1911, short)
- There's Many a Slip (1912, short) – The Young Lady
- Kilmeny (1915, short, extant, Library of Congress) – Doris Calhoun – aka Kilmeny
- Capital Punishment (1915, short) – Olive Baxley
- The Better Woman (1915) – Kate Tripler
- The Heart of Paula (1916, extant, Library of Congress) – Paula Figueroa
- The Intrigue (1916, extant, Library of Congress) – Countess Sonia Varnli
- The Road to Love (1916, extant, Library of Congress) – Hafsa
- Her Own People (1917) – Alona
- Tiger Rose (1923, extant) – Rose Bocion – Tiger Rose
- Frozen Justice (1929, lost) – Talu
- South Sea Rose (1929, lost) – Rosalie Dumay
- Camille (1936) – Olympe
- Two Smart People (1946) – Maria Ynez – Inn of the 4 Winds
- Notorious (1946) – Horsewoman with Sebastian (uncredited)
- Temptation (1946) – Marie
- Northwest Outpost (1947) – Baroness Kruposny
