= The Fighting Sheriff =

1931 film

- Directed by: Louis King
- Written by: Stuart Anthony
- Produced by: Sol Lesser
- Starring: Buck Jones; Loretta Sayers; Robert Ellis
- Cinematography: Ted Tetzlaff
- Edited by: Edward Curtiss
- Production company: Columbia Pictures
- Distributed by: Columbia Pictures
- Release date: May 15, 1931
- Running time: 67 minutes
- Country: United States
- Language: English

The Fighting Sheriff is a 1931 American Western film directed by Louis King and starring Buck Jones, Loretta Sayers and Robert Ellis.

== Cast ==
- Buck Jones as Sheriff Bob Terry
- Loretta Sayers as Mary Cameron
- Robert Ellis as Flash Halloway
- Harlan Knight as Deputy Calico Cox
- Paul Fix as Jack Cameron
- Tom Bay as Sam - Henchman
- Lillian Worth as Florabell
- Nina Quartero as Tiana
- Clarence Muse as Curfew
- Lillian Leighton as Aunt Sally

== Bibliography ==
- Pitts, Michael R. Western Movies: A Guide to 5,105 Feature Films. McFarland, 2012.
