= The Beauty Spot =

1909 musical comedy

The cast of The Beauty Spot - Herald Square Theatre (1909)

The Beauty Spot was a 1909 musical comedy in two acts that played for 137 performances at the Herald Square Theatre in New York with music by Reginald De Koven, a book by Joseph W. Herbert and additional lyrics by Terry Sullivan. The musical provided early appearances for the actresses Lillian Worth (as Lillian Wiggins) and Evelyn Laye.

Herbert had authored a musical play The Prince of Borneo, which was staged in three different versions in three different continents under three different titles in search of success until it eventually emerged in 1909 as The Beauty Spot to music by Reginald De Koven, who composed the score in 1907. The Beauty Spot ran at the Herald Square Theatre on Broadway for 137 performances from 10 April 1909 to 7 August 1909. Set in the South of France, the choreographer was Julian Alfred and the scenic designers were H. Robert Law, Edward G. Unitt and Joseph Wickes, while Frank P. Paret was the musical director.

== Synopsis ==
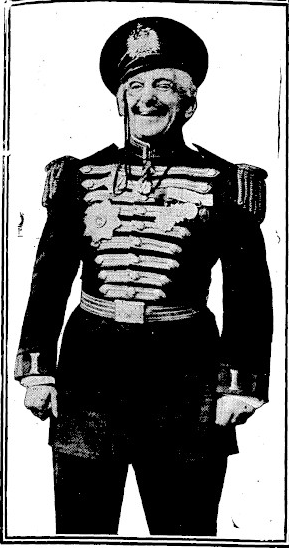
Jefferson De Angelis as General Samovar in The Beauty Spot (1909)

The action is set in the Grand Hotel at Dinard in the South of France and its adjoining gardens. General Samovar's daughter Nadine is engaged to Nikolas Kromeski but is actually in love with Jacques Baccarel, an artist the General hates because of Jacques's avant-garde notions about painting. The General is unaware that Baccarel had once painted his wife Nichette and called the picture "The Beauty Spot". Samovar is also unaware that his nephew Nikolas Kromeski, a Dutch coffee planter, has returned from Borneo and has brought his wife Pomare, a native girl from Borneo, with him. Baccarel and Kromeski swap disguises, and the disguised Baccarel masquerading as Kromeski persuades Samovar to buy "The Beauty Spot" after some more clothing has been painted on the model. In the end Samovar is reconciled to Baccarel and his daughter Nadine marrying.

The critic from The New York Times wrote:

"It is one of those aimless combinations of hurrah and hosiery that usually sprout with the Spring and continue to tra la when the days grow longer and hotter. Of its kind, it is a pretty good sort of a show too with plenty of dash and ginger, pretty girls and the kind of a story that can mean anything you want it to mean, and will not trouble you if you are not particularly fond of stories told in patches."

== Numbers ==
=== Act I - Grand Hotel at Dinard, France ===
Marguerite Clark as Nadine in The Beauty Spot (1909)

- 1."Wading" (Opening Chorus) Bathing Girls, Chorus
- 2."She Sells Sea Shells" (Song) (Music by Harry Gifford. Lyrics by Terry Sullivan.) - Samovar, Girls
- 3."The Ballerino" (Duo) - Nichette, Samovar
- 4."Memoirs" - Nichette
- 5."Foolish Questions" (Music by Alfred Baldwin Sloane. Lyrics by William Lee.) - Nichette
- 6."A Song of the Sea" (Ensemble) - Nadine, Chorus
- 7."(The) Boulevard Glide" (Duet) (Music by Melville Gideon. Lyrics by E. Ray Goetz.) - Samovar, Nadine
- 8."Creole Days" (Romance) - Jacques, Artists
- 9."Goo-Goo" (Chansonette) - Nadine
- 10.Ensemble - Samovar, Nichette, Nadine, Jacques
- 11."The Prince of Borneo" (Song) - Chickoree
- 12."Toujours la Politesse" (Trio) - Nadine, Nikolas, Jacques
- 13."Coo-ee" (Song) - Pomare, Artists
- 14. Finale Act 1 - Principals, Chorus

=== Act II - Gardens adjoining the Hotel ===
- 15 Opening Scene: Barcarolla - Victor
- 16. Fete des Fleurs - Chorus
- 17. Valse Pas Seul - Nadine
- 18."Haut Ecole" (Chariot Song; Ballet) - Ladies' Octette, Ensemble
- 19."The Cinematograph" (Song) - Samovar
- 20."Choose Her in the Morning" (song) (Music and Lyrics by Paul Barnes and R. Weston) - Samovar
- 21."Boys Will Be Boys" (Quintette) - Countess Nitsky, Artists
- 22. The Fete (Ensemble):
- 23."Salaam" (Entrance) - Chorus
- 24. Nautchtance - Models
- 25."Pretty Punchinello" (Song) - Nadine
- 26. Coconut Dance - Artists
- 27."He Loved Me Tender" (He Loved Her Tender) (Song) - Samovar, Ensemble
- 28."In a Hammock" (Hammock Love Song, or Swinging the Summer Night Long) - Nadine, Jacques
- 29."The Jungle Man" (Legend) - Pomare, Maids
- 30."Ode de Aphrodite" (Septette) - Countess Nitsky, Nadine, Jacques, Artists
- 31. Finale - Principals, Chorus

== New York cast ==
Lillian Worth (as Lillian Wiggins) in The Beauty Spot (1909)

- Marguerite Clark - Nadine, the General's daughter
- Isabel D'Armonde - Pomare, wife of Kromeski, a native of Borneo
- Jefferson De Angelis - General Samovar of the Russian delegation to Paris
- Alfred De Ball - Nikolas Kromeski - his nephew, a Dutch coffee planter from Borneo
- W. H. Denny - Baron Lecocq, Chef de Surete, Paris Bureau of Police
- Frank Doane - Chickoree his valet
- Harry Tebbutt - Victor - artist, friend of Baccarel
- Francis Tyler - Gustave - artist, friend of Baccarel
- Morgan Williams - Jean - artist, friend of Baccarel
- Frank Kelley - Paul - artist, friend of Baccarel
- Mr. Maxwell - Commissionaire
- Mr. Smith - waiter
- Viola Gillette - Nichette, the General's second wife, formerly an actress and model
- George MacFarlane - Jacques Baccarel, an American painter from New Orleans, Louisiana
- Jean Newcombe - Countess Nitsky, the General's sister
- Minerva Coverdale - Marie

The 'S' Girls:

The 'S' Girls including Lillian Worth (as Lillian Wiggins, far left on centre row) and Josephine Brandell (seated at front)

- Samis - Bertha Blake
- Sadhu - Irene Walton
- Sybile - Eileen Kearney
- Sorrell - Lillian Worth (as Lillian Wiggins)
- Sarinne - Alice Lazar
- Suzanne - Susie Pitt
- Shanley - Ellen Beckwith
- Shirley - Josephine Brandell

Bathing Girls, Maids, Chairmen, Artists, Officers of the Fleet, Sailors, Models, Nautch Dancers, Aborigines, etc., etc.

== Other productions ==
On 28 March 1910 a production including much of the original cast opened at the Alvin Theatre in Pittsburg with Jefferson De Angelis reprising his role as the flirtatious General Samovar while the other principal roles were also taken by the New York cast including George MacFarlane as Jacques Baccarel, Frank Doane in the character of the negro valet Chickoree, masquerading as a Prince of Borneo and Isabel D’Armond promoted to the leading role of Nadine, the General's daughter.

== The Beauty Spot, London (1917) ==
Programme cover for The Beauty Spot (1917) by Dolly Tree

On 22 December 1917 The Beauty Spot opened at the Gaiety Theatre in London but this production shared only the title with its American counterpart. The London version featured Evelyn Laye in an early appearance in a minor role.

The Beauty Spot ran at the Gaiety Theatre from 22 December 1917 to 4 May 1918 (152 performances). The music was composed by James W. Tate with lyrics by Clifford Harris and "Valentine". The book was by Arthur Anderson. The production was directed by J.A.E. Malone and the choreographer was Jan Oyra. The Musical Director was Arthur Wood. The posters and programme covers were designed by Dolly Tree.

The London production was adapted from the French revue scenas of P. L. Flers and featured the dance partnership of the French danseuse Régine Flory and her Polish partner Jan Oyra. This version included a memorable dance sequence called 'The Spirit of Hashish' in which Régine Flory succumbed to the influence of drugs.

=== Synopsis ===
Napoleon Bramble has written a popular guide book to Baluchistan - where every woman wears a beauty spot – and it is selling well. The only problem is that the guide book is a fraud; Bramble has never visited Baluchistan and the book was actually written by a dead friend. Bramble's wife Josephine persuades him to write a book of his own. Bramble confides his secret to the journalist Paul Prince, and asks him to be a ghostwriter for his new book. However, the son of the dead friend arrives on the scene disguised as Schamyl from Baluchistan together with his lady-friend, Kadouja. Schamyl sees an opportunity for blackmail but before he can put his scheme into action falls in love with Bramble's daughter, Leonie, much to the annoyance of her fiancé, Benjy Cardigan. Cardigan suspects that Schamyl is a fraud and arranges a pageant of wild folkdancers from Baluchistan which exposes the fraudsters.

=== Cast ===
- Arthur Whitby - Napoleon Bramble
- Maisie Gay - Josephine Bramble
- Tom Walls - Paul Prince
- Claude Cameron - Schamyl
- Régine Flory - Kadouja
- Moya Mannering - Leonie Bramble
- Douglas McLaren - Benjy Cardigan
- Jan Oyra - The Spirit of Hashish
- Peggy Kurton, Jean Cadell, Evelyn Laye

=== Songs ===
- Give Me the Frocks
- I Wish I was a Dog
- The Flower That Never Dies
- The Kiss You're Going to Get
- Season
- (Interpolated: Poor Butterfly)
