= Kilmeny (film) =

1915 film by Oscar Apfel

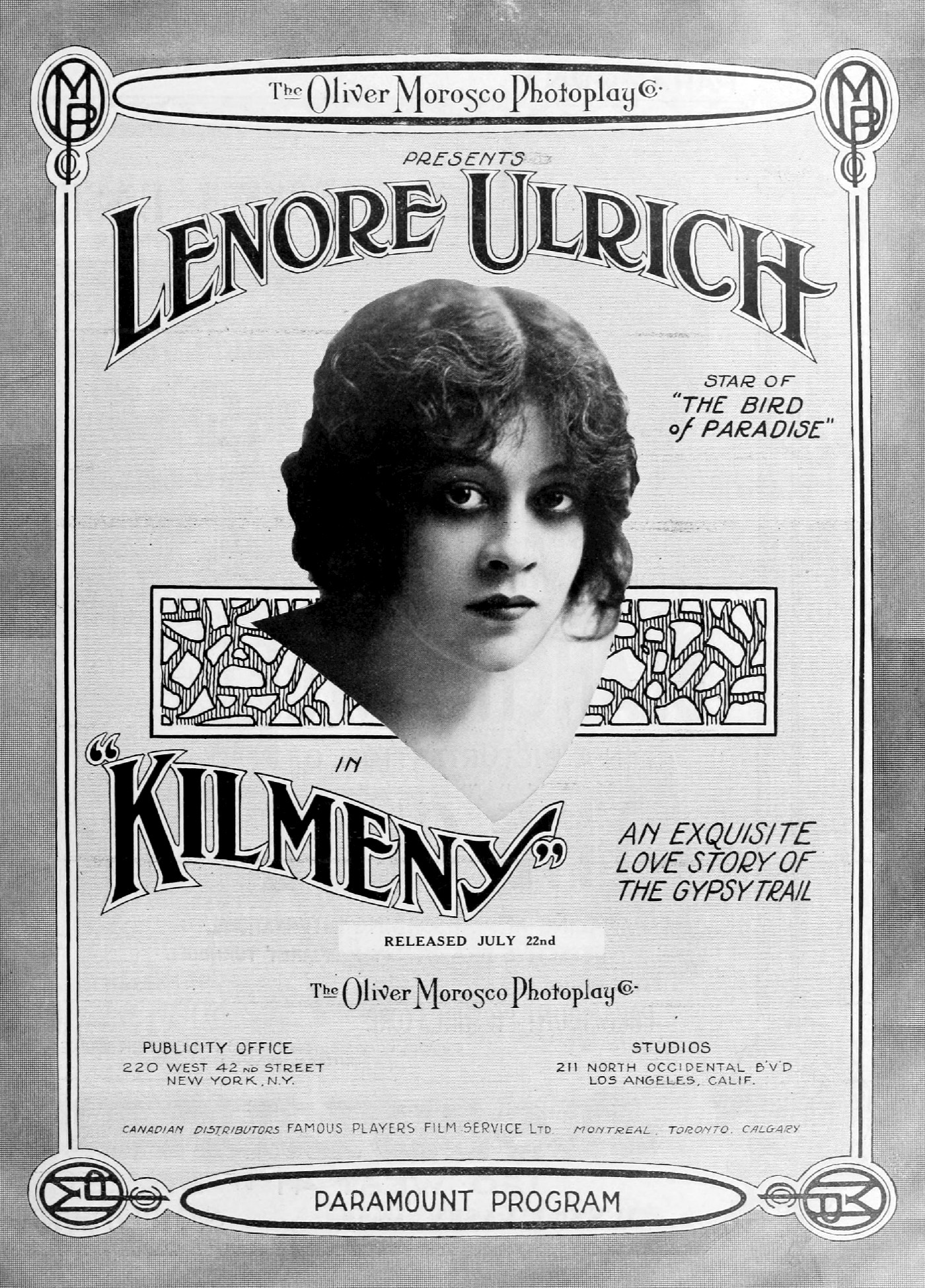
- Ad for film
- Directed by: Oscar Apfel
- Story by: Louise B. Stanwood
- Produced by: Oliver Morosco
- Starring: Lenore Ulric; William Desmond; Doris Baker; Herbert Standing; Howard Davies; Gordon Griffith
- Production company: Oliver Morosco Photoplay Company
- Distributed by: Paramount Pictures
- Release date: July 22, 1915
- Country: United States
- Language: Silent (English intertitles)

Kilmeny is a surviving 1915 American silent comedy film directed by Oscar Apfel and written by Louise B. Stanwood. The film stars Lenore Ulric, William Desmond, Doris Baker, Herbert Standing, Howard Davies and Gordon Griffith. The film was released July 22, 1915, by Paramount Pictures.

== Cast ==
- Lenore Ulric as Doris Calhoun
- William Desmond as Bob Meredith
- Doris Baker as Doris Calhoun, as a child
- Herbert Standing as Gypsy Chief
- Howard Davies as Barouche
- Gordon Griffith as Pierre, the boy
- Marshall Mackaye as Pierre, the Man
- Frederick Wilson as Lord Leigh
- Myrtle Stedman as Lady Leigh

== Preservation status ==
A print is preserved in the Library of Congress collection Packard Campus for Audio-Visual Conservation.
