= Maud Boyd =

English actress and singer (1867–1929)

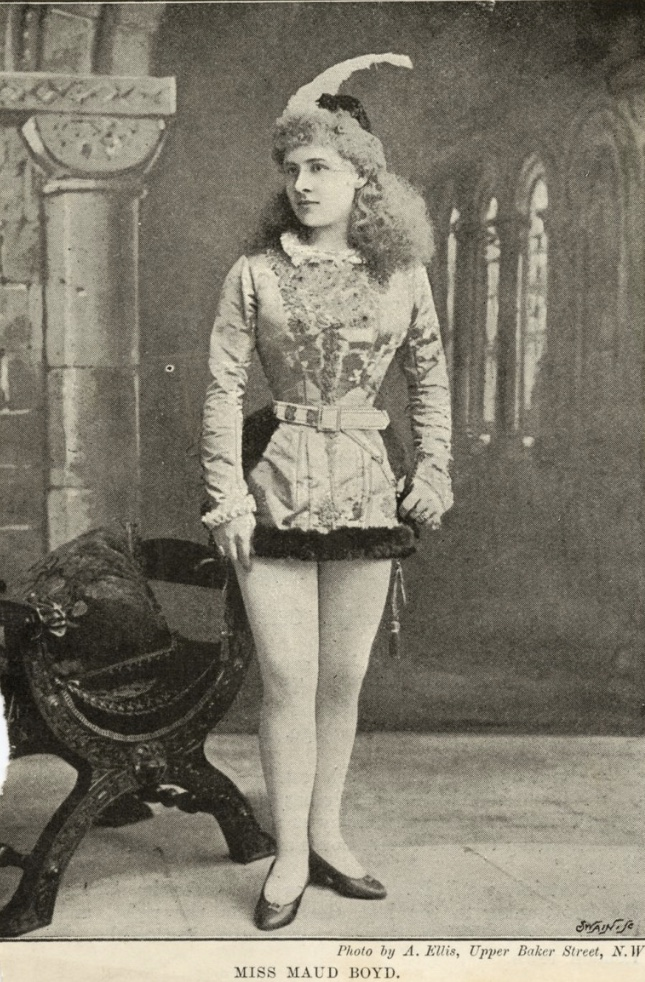
Maud Boyd as Prince Charming in Little Red Riding Hood (1893)

Maud Rachel Boyd (1 February 1867 – 23 February 1929) was an English actress and singer known for musical theatre and principal boy roles in pantomime.

== Life and career ==
Boyd was born in 1867 at Chorlton-on-Medlock in Manchester, the daughter of James Boyd (1840–1870) and Elizabeth Montgomery née Hodgson (1834–1921). In 1881 aged 13 she was a boarder at Adelphi House Convent, a Catholic girls' school in Salford in Greater Manchester that was run by nuns. On the curriculum was music.

Lawrence Rea (left), Walter Passmore, Ruth Vincent and Boyd (right) in Leedham Bantock's The Belle of Brittany (1908)

As a pantomime principal boy she played Prince Charming in Little Red Riding Hood at the Gaiety Theatre, Dublin in December 1893, the title role in the panto Robin Hood, while over Christmas 1894 she was in Babes in the Wood in Liverpool. Christmas 1895 found her in pantomime at the Theatre Royal in Hull From December 1897 she played Alice in Dick Whittington at the Alexandra Theatre in Stoke Newington. In Dublin in 1899 she recorded "The Golden Isle" from A Greek Slave for the Gramophone Company, but it was not released. In Manchester in February 1900 she appeared in The Forty Thieves at the Theatre Royal.

She was Sir Peterborough Court in Cinder Ellen up too Late at the Gaiety Theatre (1891), Kitt in Kitty Grey at the Apollo Theatre (1901), Lady Chaldicott in The Belle of Mayfair at the Vaudeville Theatre (1906), Madame Poquelin in The Belle of Brittany at the Queen's Theatre (1908), and Friedrike in A Waltz Dream at Hicks Theatre (1908).

Boyd died in a nursing home in Manchester in 1929 aged 61. She was buried in the Southern Cemetery in Manchester. She never married, and in her will she left £302 7s 8d to her half brother.
