= Josephine Brandell =

American actress

Josephine Brandell in The Beauty Spot (New York, 1909)

Josephine Mary Brandell (September 1887–27 June 1977) was an Austrian-Jewish musical actress notable for surviving the torpedoing of the RMS Lusitania in 1915. Following her marriage in 1945 to Beresford Cecil Bingham, 8th Earl Annesley she became known as Josephine Bingham, Countess of Annesley.

== Early life ==
According to the 1900 U.S. Federal Census and the 1905 New York State Census, Josephine Brandell was actually born as Janetta Kleinberg in Austria in 1887 into a Jewish family, the daughter of Fishel 'Phillip' Kleinberg (born 1848) and Yetta née Goldstein (1857–1953). Her siblings included Samuel Lasker Kleinberg, Sadie Zehring Kleinberg and William Kleinberg. Later in applications for passports and American citizenship she claimed that she was a British citizen born on 26 November 1891 or 1892 in Bucharest in Romania, the daughter of Phillip Brandell.

Her father, a tailor by profession, immigrated to the United States of America, settling in New York City in 1895, with the rest of the family following him in 1897 and 1898. Josephine Brandell had ambitions of becoming an actress and attempted to break into show business on the New York stage while in her early teens but this was temporarily put on hold when in 1907 at the age of 19 she married dentist and naturalised American citizen Dr Bernard Black Brandeis (1879–1944), also from Romania. The marriage made Brandell an American citizen but it was short-lived with the couple divorcing in September 1910 following which she assumed the name 'Brandell', possibly to avoid anti-Semitic persecution. After the divorce Brandell resumed her ambition of following a career on the stage.

== Career ==
Cast of The Beauty Spot (1909); Brandell seated at the front

A soprano, 'Jenny' Brandell's first small role was in the comic-opera Nightbirds by Johann Strauss in which she toured Europe and America with Fritzi Scheff and gaining favourable press coverage for her performance. On Broadway she appeared in The Beauty Spot (1909) at the Herald Square Theatre; as Maline in The Belle of Brittany (1909–1910) at Daly's Theatre; in Tillie's Nightmare (1910–1911) at the Herald Square Theatre and as Sidi in The Merry Countess (1912) at the Casino Theatre.

In 1913 she travelled to London to study music and to perform in a number of operatic and other musical productions, living there on and off for the next six years. In 1913 Brandell played her first leading role in the revue Come Over Here, performed at the London Opera House. After that her career took off with engagements in England and Broadway. On her numerous trans-Atlantic crossings one of her favourite ships was the RMS Lusitania, one of the most exclusive and fastest luxury liners of the time.

== Lusitania ==
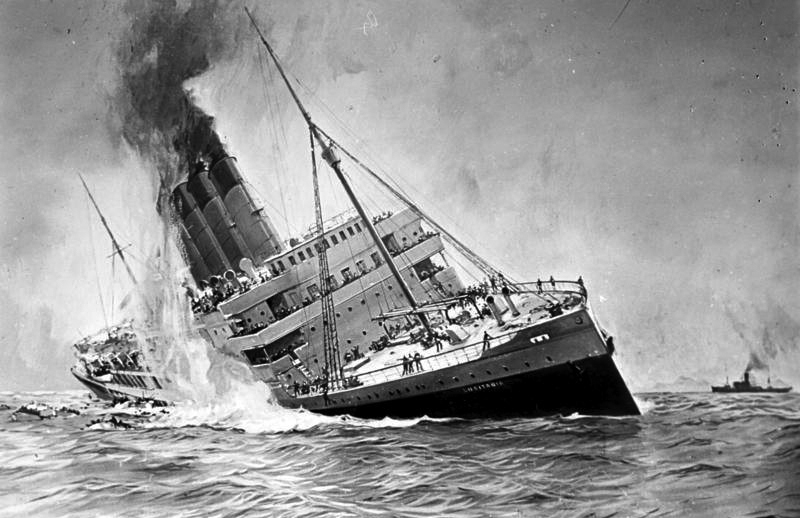
Painting of the sinking of RMS Lusitania in 1915

After Brandell had played on Broadway in the spring of 1915 on May 1 she boarded the RMS Lusitania to return to London. She was accompanied by Mrs Mabel Crichton, the wife of a friend. The actress knew of the danger of being hit by a submarine in British territorial waters and she was not confident that the ship could outrace a submarine and, as she put it, was "in a state" for much of the voyage. She and Mabel Crichton (who did not survive the sinking) became friendly with their tablemates: Max Schwarcz and Francis Bertram Jenkins. However, despite the convivial company on board Brandell never got over her feeling of dread. Jenkins did not help matters by pointing out the shortage of lifebelts on board. Brandell begged Mabel Crichton to allow her to stay the night in Crichton's cabin because she was so frightened. Crichton welcomed Brandell into her cabin and spent most of the night trying to reassure her that nothing would happen to them. However, Brandell's fears were proved right and the next day on May 7, 1915, the Lusitania was torpedoed by a German submarine and sank. In her written deposition to the authorities Brandell wrote:

Josephine Mary Brandell photographed for The Graphic (1915)

"Dear Sir,

I am replying to your request in giving my statement to the best of my recollection about the sinking of the Lusitania.

I had just finished making a collection for the musicians and sat down to finish my lunch where Mrs. N. Crigchton (sic.), Mr. Jenkins, and Mrs. [sic] Schwartz, (an American) were sitting, when I heard the explosion. We all jumped up. Poor Mrs. Crigchton [sic] exclaiming “They have done it”. In fact I was nervous during the whole trip; so much so, that I kept worrying my friends about fearing the sub-marines.

Thursday night I was in a state that I could not sleep in my own cabin, so I asked Mrs. Crigchton (sic.) if I could sleep in her cabin, “Poor soul”, she was only too happy to be of any assistance to me and did all she could during the whole night to quiet my nerves. The next morning I heard the hooting of the horn as it was foggy. Everything went well untill [sic] I sat down to lunch when the explosion occurred. The people rushed for the stairs. I heard someone shouting to be calm. I looked up and saw it was one of the captains. I cannot say whether it was the first or the second...

...When we finally reached the top deck, I saw very few of the first class passengers. I was simply horrified with fright. Mr. Schwartz’s trying to calm me when Mr. E. Gorer, (the art dealer of Bond Street) rushed over to us and put a life-belt on me which was the means of my being saved and told me to be brave. He returning for other life-belts and Mr. Schwartz after putting me into the boat where Mrs. Crigchton [sic] was already sitting, went to help other women. That’s the last I saw of those two brave heroes. Just then our boat was lowered but immediately it hit the water it upset, throwing all its occupants out. About six were saved from that boat which contained 60 or 70 passengers. The sights I saw when that boat upset is too awful. Words cannot describe it. A rope was thrown to us which a few caught hold of. I then remember a few of us getting hold of an oar, but some of them soon dropped off. The cries for mercy, the people drowning and coming up again within three minutes time barely touching me was too terrible. Somehow I caught hold of a deck chair which was floating near me and held on until I became numb when I was picked up by Mr. Harkness, the assistant purser, who afterwards told me he thought I was gone when he first looked at me.

There were plenty of life-belts on board but there was not any time to get at them. I did not see any guns, amunition [sic] or Canadian troops. The discipline was alright from what I saw. I was only five minutes on the Lusitania after she had been struck. The first boat and the second in which I was in were upset, the reason I cannot tell. I did not hear any explosion after the first. I may add that we ought to have gone faster than 16 knots an hour in the War Zone and a Cruiser should have been sent by the Admiralty to meet us.

Yours truly

Josephine Brandell

P.S. The people behaved very well considering the terrible occurence [sic]. I never heard any cries or any disturbances. I thought everyone was very brave. The men passengers that I saw and the crew did all they could to help the women.

J.B."

Brandell never fully recovered from this tragedy, having been pulled nearly dead from the water and becoming hysterical when revived - consequently suffering for the rest of her life with nightmares.

== Later years ==
On returning to the United States Brandell filed a claim for compensation with the U.S. State Department. This could not be considered until the War had ended but following her marriage to British stock broker John Ormiston Lawson-Johnson (1877–1955) on 19 May 1920 she gave up her American citizenship. On 19 March 1925 the Mixed Claims Commission refused her compensation claim as she was no longer an American citizen despite the fact that she had been at the time of the sinking.

After the Lusitania drama Brandell failed to continue her promising career which had begun so successfully. She had difficulty concentrating and could not put herself in other characters, therefore she appeared only sporadically in small roles and gradually faded from the acting scene. Her marriage to John Ormiston Lawson-Johnson was not happy and ended in divorce in 1928. She quickly entered into a third marriage in London on 1 June 1929 with George John Seymour Repton (1898–1943), who served as a captain in the Irish Guards during World War II; the marriage was harmonious and happy. During World War II Brandell founded the organization 'The American Friends of Britain' designed to foster understanding between the two nations. On May 10, 1943, George Repton died unexpectedly in London, leaving Brandell comfortably off with nearly £50,000 in his will.

On December 7, 1945, in London she married her fourth husband, Beresford Cecil Bingham (1894–1957), the 8th Earl Annesley, and 9th Viscount of Glerawly, giving her the title of Countess of Annesley. Bingham had been a Pilot Officer in the Royal Air Force Volunteer Reserve during World War II; he had also previously served as a Lieutenant in the 6th Battalion Royal Fusiliers. After his death on June 29, 1957, she returned to New York, where she led a quiet and unassuming life and there she died in June 1977 at the age of 89. She was buried in a mausoleum at Woodlawn Cemetery in the Bronx in New York. She had no children from any of her four marriages.
