= The Belle of Brittany =

Edwardian musical comedy

Lawrence Rea (left), Walter Passmore, Ruth Vincent and Maud Boyd (right) in The Belle of Brittany

The Belle of Brittany is an Edwardian musical comedy in two acts set in 'Daffodil Time' in rustic 18th-century Brittany. It premiered at the Queen's Theatre in London on 24 October 1908. The music is by Howard Talbot and Marie Horne, to a book by Leedham Bantock and P. J. Barrow, with lyrics by Percy Greenbank. A Broadway production opened at Daly's Theatre in New York in November 1909 and ran for 72 performances. It was directed by Frank Smithson and featured Josephine Brandell and Margaret Dumont in early roles.

== Synopsis ==
Vincent and Rea beneath the "Trysting Tree"

Babette is the only daughter of Poquelin, a prosperous miller, who holds the mortgage on the château and estate of the gay old Marquis de St. Gautier. Babette, according to the custom of her village, has been betrothed by her parents to Baptiste, a famous Paris chef, who is hourly expected to claim his bride.

Facing the mill is a fine old tree known as the "Trysting Tree", to which is attached a curious legend. If man and maid meet beneath its branches and exchange vows of love at the moment the bells of a neighbouring convent chime, then a happy marriage may be expected. Had Baptiste arrived a little sooner it might have been his good fortune to have experienced that felicitous omen, but as it happens, it is young Raymond de St. Gautier, the son of a Marquis, who was the fortunate individual, and he and Babette fall in love at first sight.

The old Marquis, however, has different views as to his son's matrimonial affairs. To relieve the estate from the heavy debts with which it is burdened it is necessary that Raymond should make a rich marriage, and to that end the Marquis is doing all in his power to bring about a union between Raymond and his wealthy ward, Mlle. Denise de la Vire. Denise also has a love affair to hand, with the Comte Victoire de Casserole, and she is determined that her fortune and her heart shall be placed in the same keeping. But there is a golden lining to the Marquis's cloud, and, as the old miller promises the mortgage deeds as Babette's dowry, the Marquis withdraws his objections, and the bells of Brittany give hearty and melodious salutation to the daffodil "belle".

== Original cast ==
Darrell as Toinette and Graves as the Marquis de St. Gautier

- Baptiste Boubillon (a chef) – Walter Passmore
- Raymond de St. Gautier (son of the Marquis) – Lawrence Rea
- Comte Victoire de Casserole (a dandy) – Davy Burnaby
- Poquelin (a miller) – M. R. Morand
- Old Jacques (a clarionet player) – E. W. Royce
- Pierre (driver of Post Chaise) – Frank Melville
- The Marquis de St. Gautier – George Graves
- Toinette (maid to the Marquis) – Maudi Darrell
- Mlle. Denise de la Vire (ward of the Marquis) – Lily Iris
- Madame Poquelin – Maud Boyd
- Babette (Poquelin's daughter) – Ruth Vincent

Artists:

- Bertrand – Vere Mathews
- Eugene – John Montague
- Phillippe – Harry Leslie
- Vivien – Hamlyn Hamling

Postillions to the Marquis:

- Lucille – Blanche Stocker
- Maquette – Cora Carey

Daffodil gatherers:

- Adele – Alice Hatton
- Mirette – Blanche Carlow
- Christine – Minnie Baker
- Rosalie – Gladys Saqui

== Broadway production (1909–1910) ==
A production of The Belle of Brittany opened at Daly's Theatre in New York on 11 November 1909 and ran for 72 performances until 1 January 1910. The production is notable for an early appearance by Margaret Dumont (billed as Daisy Dumont) as Mlle. Denise de la Vire. Other notable cast members included Josephine Brandell as Maline, Martin Brown as Baptiste Boubillon, and Frank Daniels as Marquis de St. Gautier.

The critic of The New York Times wrote of the show:

"One of the most enjoyable musical comedies that has appeared along Broadway in a good while is The Belle of Brittany, in which Frank Daniels disported himself last night at Daly's. It is very funny, but always dainty, and the music, while not pretentious, is much above the kind to which New Yorkers have become gloomily resigned in shows of this sort."

== Musical numbers ==
=== Act I – The Old Mill in the Bois D'Amour, Pont Aven ===
- No. 1. Chorus – "In the golden days of early spring when the hedgerows start a-blossoming..."
- No. 2. Octet – Peasant Girls and Artists – "Although you've tried your feelings to hide, you let the simplest felow see..."
- No. 3. Madame Poquelin and Girls – "On the border of the wood this old tree has proudly stood for ages past..."
- No. 4. Chorus of Daffodil Girls – "From the meadows green with our baskets laden, fill'd with nodding daffodils..."
- No. 5. Babette and Chorus – "Ev'ry country, ev'ry clime, whether east or west, has its own particular time..."
- No. 6. Raymond and Chorus of Men – "Oh, marriage I'm afraid is a very selfish state..."
- No. 7. Chorus and Entrance of Marquis – "We're all in a fluster, we're all in a flurry..."
- No. 8. Babette and Raymond – "When a maiden goes to market with a basket on her arm..."
- No. 9. Toinette and Chorus – "When Monsieur le Marquis wakes up each morning early, he rings the bell for me..."
- No. 10. Chorus of Welcome – "The hero proudly comes, so chase your pensive mood away..."
- No. 11. Baptiste and Chorus – "As the chef of a swell Parisian hotel, I have studied the human inside..."
- No. 12. Baptiste and Toinette – "A Nanny-goat and a Billy-goat frolicked in a field together..."
- No. 13. Marquis – "If Love's golden flame you would kindle in a heart that is colder than clay..."
- No. 14. Babette and Chorus – "The chimes from the old church steeple ring out o'er the fields afar..."
- No. 15. Finale Act I – "With joyous peal and merry, the wedding bells are ringing..."

=== Act II – The Château St. Gautier ===
- No. 16. Chorus of Girls, Peasants and Artists – "Wreathe the golden flow'r of promise, decorate the spacious hall..."
- No. 17. Toinette and Chorus – "A dear little Breton maid once lived on a dairy farm..."
- No. 18. Monsieur and Mme. Poquelin, Marquis, Denise and Victoire – "O what a treat for humble folk..."
- No. 19. Concerted number – "Over the roads of Loverland, Cupid drives a four-in-hand, looking out for passengers to carry..."
- No. 20. Raymond and Chorus – "Since the days when beauteous Helen dwelt in the halls of ancient Troy..."
- No. 21. Denise and Chorus of Girls – "When first a little country mouse leaves friends and relations..."
- No. 22. Baptiste and Chorus of Cooks – "When children scream and quarrel, as only children can..."
- No. 23. Babette – "With careless tread, a maiden takes her path a-down youth's rosy way..."
- No. 24. Country dance
- No. 25. Toinette and Baptiste – "I've had enough of Paris, so I think that you and I just out of town will settle down..."
- No. 26. Marquis and Mme. Poquelin – "Fair lady, be not deaf to my persuasion, for I am of a sentimental stamp..."
- No. 27. Raymond and Babette – "When you're my little wife, Babette, for the rest of our life, Babette..."
- No. 28. Finale Act II – "It's daffodil time in Brittany, in Brittany, in Brittany. Blossoms unfold in green and gold..."

Supplementary numbers:

- No. 29. Toinette and Artists – "I'm very fond of pictures, both modern ones and old..."
- No. 30. Babette – "When a maiden realizes that it is her wedding day..."

(Nos. 3, 7, 8, 14 and 27 were composed by Marie Horne)
