= Dolly Tree =

British costume designer (1899–1962)

Dolly Tree photographed with a long cigarette holder in 1926

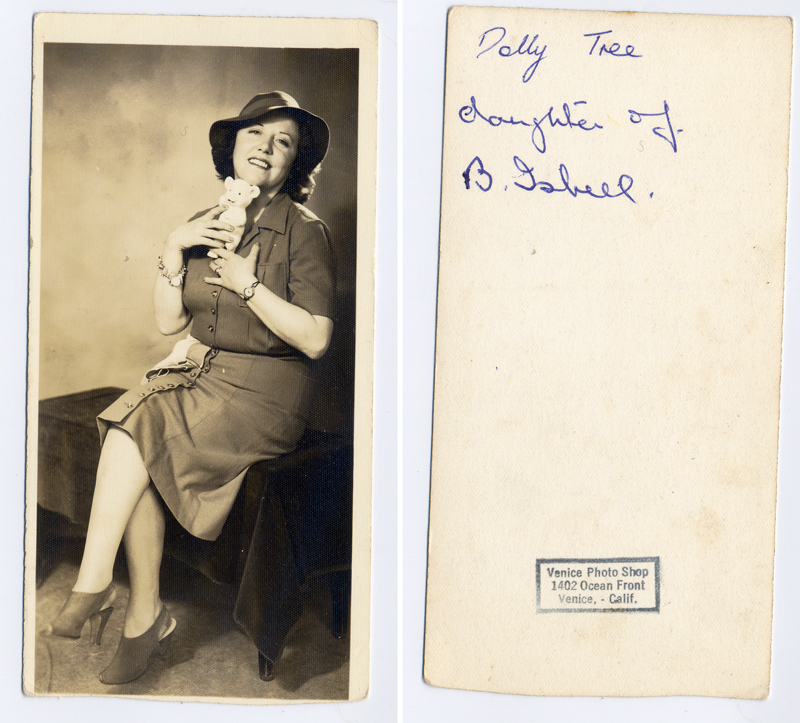
Scanned portrait photograph from family collection, with stamp from Venice Photo Shop, 1402 Ocean Front, Venice, California on the rear and a handwritten note which refers to her mother, Bertha Isbell

Dolly Tree (17 March 1899 – 17 May 1962) was an English illustrator, actress and costume designer who during the 1930s and 1940s designed dresses for Myrna Loy, Jean Harlow, Rosalind Russell, Maureen O'Sullivan and Judy Garland among others in addition to costuming historical dramas such as David Copperfield (1935) and A Tale of Two Cities (1935).

== Biography ==
Programme design by Tree for The Beauty Spot at the Gaiety Theatre in London (1917)

Born in Westbury-on-Trym in Bristol in 1899 as Dorothy Marian Isbell, the daughter of Charles Edwin Isbell (1863–1942), a solicitor, and Bertha Marian (née Keith-Williams) (1874–1947). At an early age she discovered an aptitude for drawing before being drawn towards a career on the stage. In 1912 her family relocated to London and she began her career as an artist after seeing the play Vanity Fair at the Palace Theatre in 1916. Of the play she later wrote, ‘I was fascinated by the wonderful dancing and art of Regine Flory and admired her so much that I started to design a special poster of her, really to amuse myself, based on my recollections of this vivid artist seen across the footlights.’ A friend took her drawing to Sir Alfred Butt who bought it and gave her a two-year contract (c1917-1918) to design posters and programme covers for of all his shows including The Boy (1917), The Beauty Spot (1917), Going Up (1918), Telling the Tale (1918), The Latest Craze (1919), The Kiss Call (1919), Very Good Eddie (1919) and Hello America (1919). Her comic illustrations also appeared in various British newspapers and magazines.

Between 1915 and 1918 Dolly Tree appeared in five British silent films as an actress. In the United Kingdom her career as a costume designer began in the 1920s on various cabaret shows in London in particular; in 1923 she collaborated on her first film, Woman to Woman, directed by Graham Cutts and with Alfred Hitchcock as the co-screenwriter, artistic director and assistant director. Her work became popular in Paris where she became the first English person and the first woman to design for the Folies Bergère.

In 1926 she moved to the United States, first working in New York where she created the costumes for the 1928 Broadway play Diamond Lil starring Mae West. She then went to Hollywood where she was involved in designing for 175 American films, firstly for Fox Studios (1929–1931) and then for Metro-Goldwyn-Mayer (1931–1942), mainly as a designer of dresses, among others alongside Adrian. In 1931 while working at Fox Studios she met and married the American Naval officer Thomas Kimes. The marriage was a happy one, but his career in the Navy kept them apart and they divorced in 1940. After her divorce Tree began to drink heavily and left MGM in 1942 to work for a wholesale company before returning to Fox Studios where she married her second husband, Don E. Whiteford. However, this marriage also did not work and they quickly divorced, which drove Tree further into alcoholism. Her second divorce, her heavy drinking and the death of her father in 1942 led to her becoming increasing unreliable and losing her job.

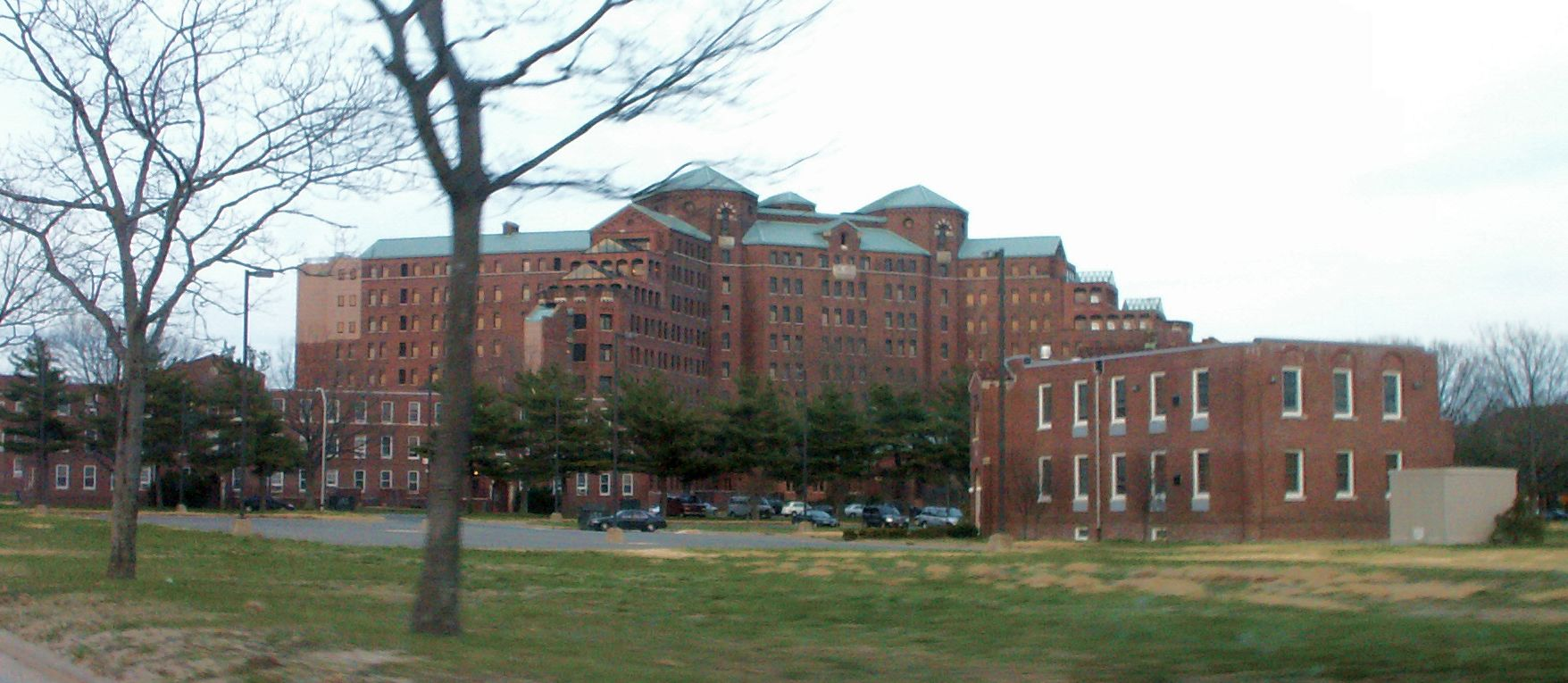
Tree died in the Pilgrim State Hospital in New York, now the Pilgrim Psychiatric Center

Dolly Tree died aged 63 at the Pilgrim State Hospital in New York in 1962. In her will she left £757 to Arthur Thomas Isbell, a retired shopkeeper, and Edith Mary Kelynack (1894–1971) in her native United Kingdom.

== Partial filmography ==
=== As actress ===
- 1915 : Love in a Wood
- 1915 : From Shopgirl to Duchess – Tilly
- 1915 : The Disorder of the Bath
- 1916 : Two Lancashire Lasses in London
- 1918 : Hindle Wakes – Mary Hollins

=== As costume designer ===
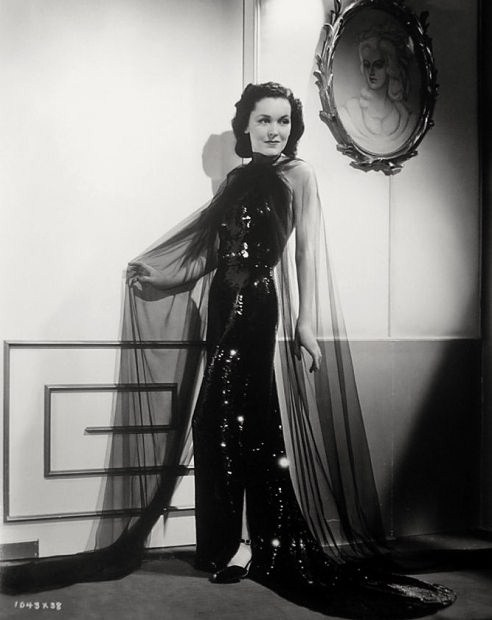
Maureen O'Sullivan in Hold That Kiss (1938) wearing a dress designed by Dolly Tree

- 1923 : Woman to Woman
- 1923 : The Woman Dancer
- 1930 : Just Imagine
- 1931 : The Public Enemy
- 1931 : Bad Girl
- 1932 : Almost Married
- 1934 : Stamboul Quest
- 1934 : Evelyn Prentice
- 1934 : Manhattan Melodrama
- 1934 : The Gay Bride
- 1934 : The Thin Man
- 1935 : David Copperfield
- 1935 : A Night at the Opera
- 1935 : Whipsaw
- 1935 : Public Hero No. 1
- 1935 : A Tale of Two Cities
- 1936 : Riffraf
- 1936 : Trouble for Two
- 1936 : The Garden Murder Case
- 1936 : The Unguarded Hour
- 1936 : His Brother's Wife
- 1936 : Fury
- 1936 : Suzy
- 1936 : Libeled Lady
- 1936 : ‘’Absolute Quiet’’
- 1936 : After the Thin Man
- 1936 : The Devil-Doll
- 1936 : The Robin Hood of El Dorado
- 1937 : Rosalie
- 1937 : A Day at the Races
- 1937 : The Good Earth
- 1938 : Arsène Lupin Returns
- 1938 : Port of Seven Seas
- 1938 : Too Hot to Handle
- 1938 : Hold That Kiss
- 1938 : Spring Madness
- 1938 : The Girl Downstairs
- 1938 : Test Pilot
- 1939 : At the Circus
- 1939 : Babes in Arms
- 1939 : Miracles for Sale
- 1939 : Another Thin Man
- 1939 : Blackmail
- 1940 : Young Tom Edison
- 1940 : Strike up the Band
- 1940 : Little Nellie Kelly
- 1940 : Flight Command
- 1940 : Andy Hardy Meets Debutante
- 1942 : Tales of Manhattan
- 1942 : Thunder Birds
- 1942 : The Loves of Edgar Allan Poe
- 1942 : Ten Gentlemen from West Point
