= Frozen Justice =

1929 film

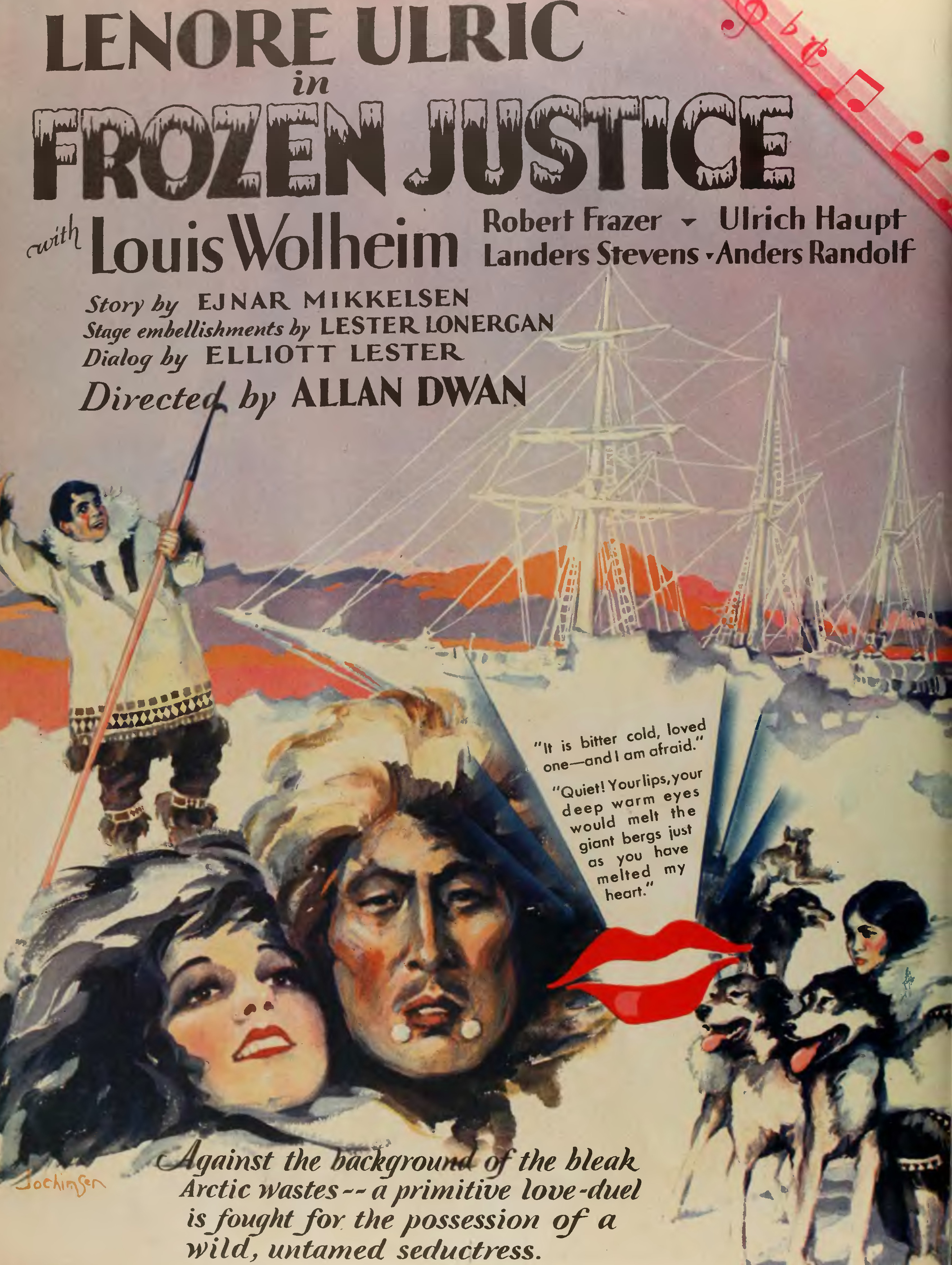
- Directed by: Allan Dwan
- Written by: Sonya Levien (scenario); Owen Davis (additional dialogue)
- Based on: Norden For Lov og Ret by Ejnar Mikkelsen
- Starring: Lenore Ulric
- Cinematography: Harold Rosson; Charles G. Clarke (2nd unit)
- Edited by: Harold Schuster
- Music by: Arthur Kay
- Distributed by: Fox Film Corporation
- Release date: October 25, 1929
- Running time: 73 minutes
- Country: United States
- Languages: Silent; English intertitles

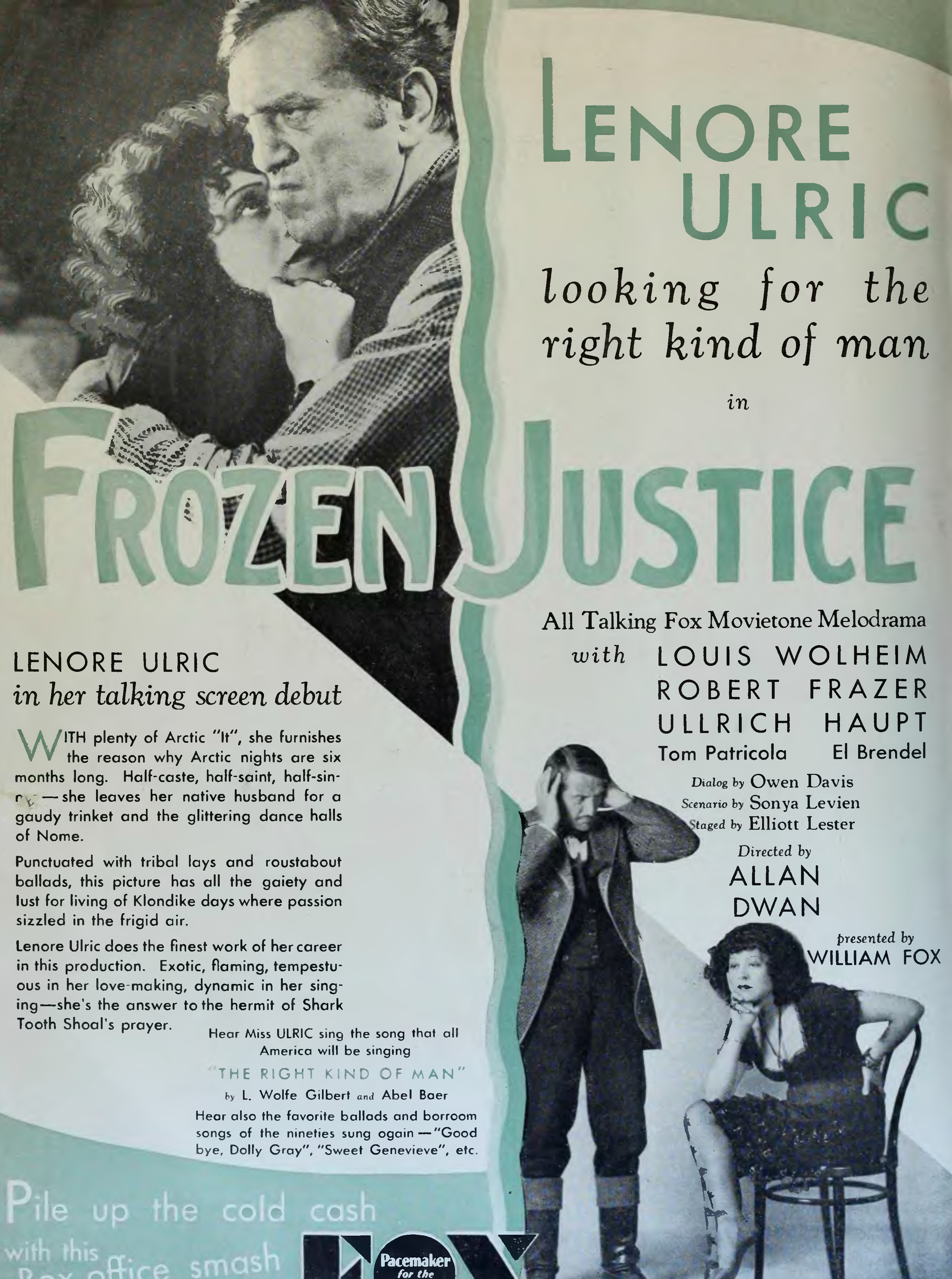
"Frozen Justice" ad from The Film Daily, 1929

Frozen Justice is a 1929 American sound (All-Talking) pre-Code drama film directed by Allan Dwan. The picture starred Lenore Ulric in her first sound film and is based on the 1920 novel, Norden For Lov og Ret, by Ejnar Mikkelsen. A shorter, silent version of the film was also released. The film was set in Nome, Alaska during the Klondike Gold Rush in 1898 and 1899.

Both versions are now presumed lost. One reel of the film still exists and is preserved at the Library of Congress.

== Cast ==
- Lenore Ulric as Talu
- Robert Frazer as Lanak
- Louis Wolheim as "Duke"
- Ullrich Haupt as Captain Jones
- Laska Winter as Doulgamana
- El Brendel as "Swede"
- Tom Patricola as "Dancer"
- Alice Lake as "Little Casino"
- Gertrude Astor as Kate "Moosehide Kate"
- Adele Windsor as Boston School Ma'am
- Neyneen Farrell as Lucy "Yukon Lucy"
- Warren Hymer as The Bartender
- Lou Morrison as The Proprietor
- Charles Judels as The French Sailor
- Joe Rochay as The Jewish Character
- Meyers Sisters as The Harmony Duo
- George MacFarlane as The Singer
- Landers Stevens as Mate Moore
- James Spencer as The Medicine Man
- Arthur Stone as Pete "French Pete"
- Jack Ackroyd as Eddie "English Eddie"
- Gertrude Chorre as Talu's Mother

== Reception ==
The film received mixed reviews from critics. While critics praised the scenery and atmosphere, most felt the story was weak. The critic for the New York Herald Tribune felt the story was "chiefly deficient" while Variety called the film "moderately good".

The film premiered at the Roxy Theatre in New York City on October 25, 1929. The film's star, Lenore Ulric, and director Allan Dwan made a personal appearance at the premiere. Four days later, the stock market crashed which affected audience turnout as celebratory films about the gold rush were less of a draw.

== See also ==
- List of early sound feature films (1926–1929)
